= List of castles in Ukraine =

This is a list of castles in Ukraine.

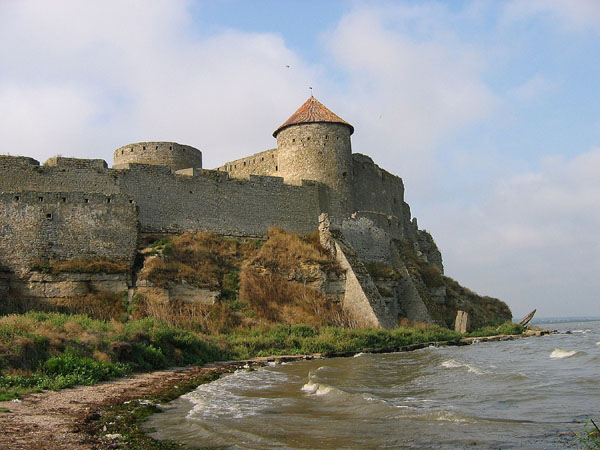
Akkerman Fortress in Bilhorod-Dnistrovskyi

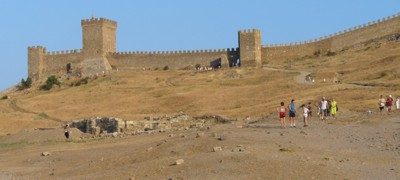
Genoese fortress in Sudak

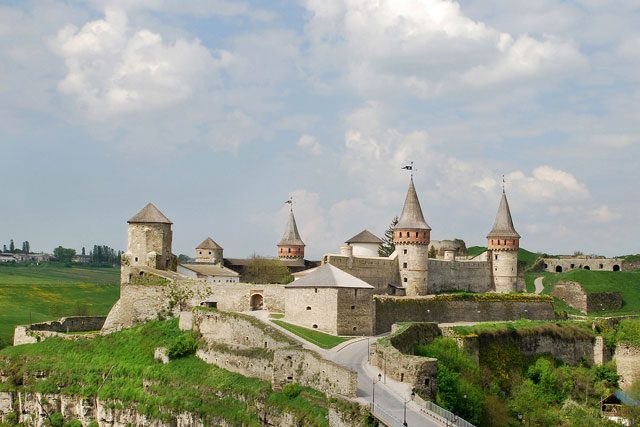
The Kamianets-Podilskyi Castle

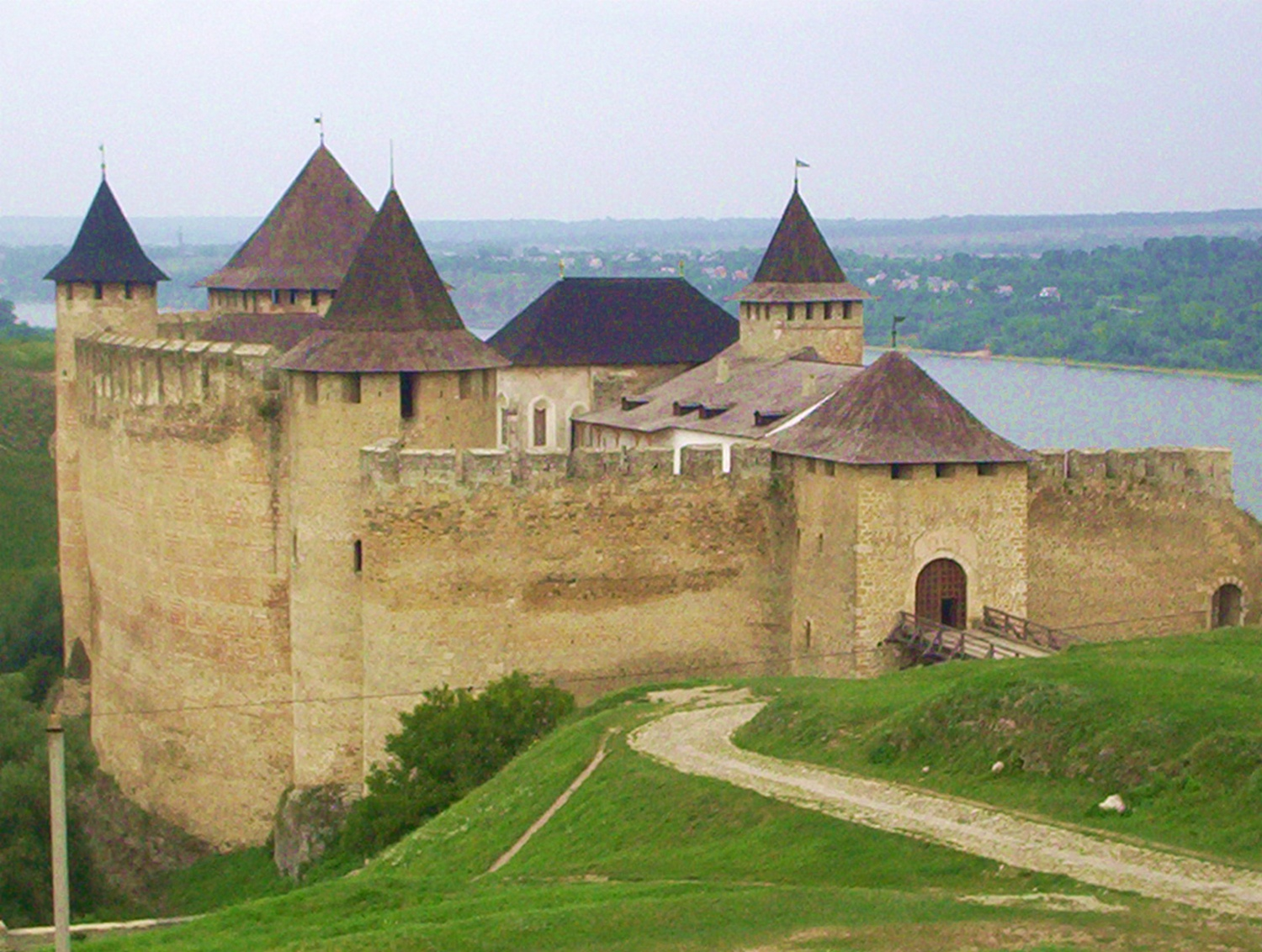
Khotyn Fortress

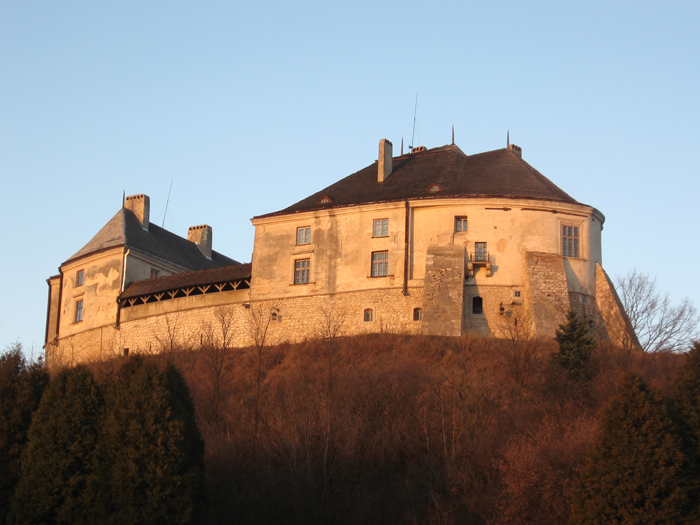
The Olesko Castle

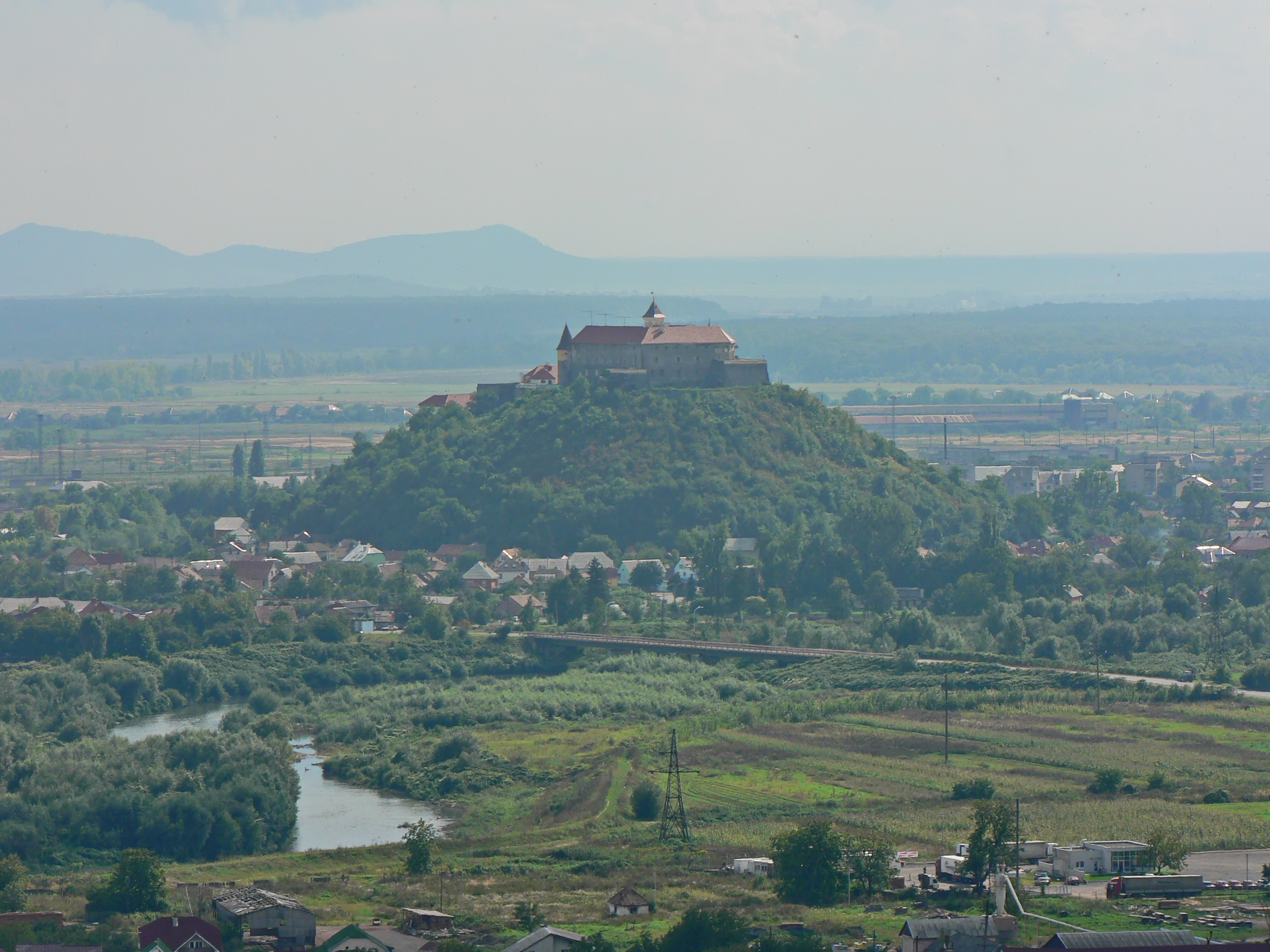
The Palanok Castle in Mukachevo

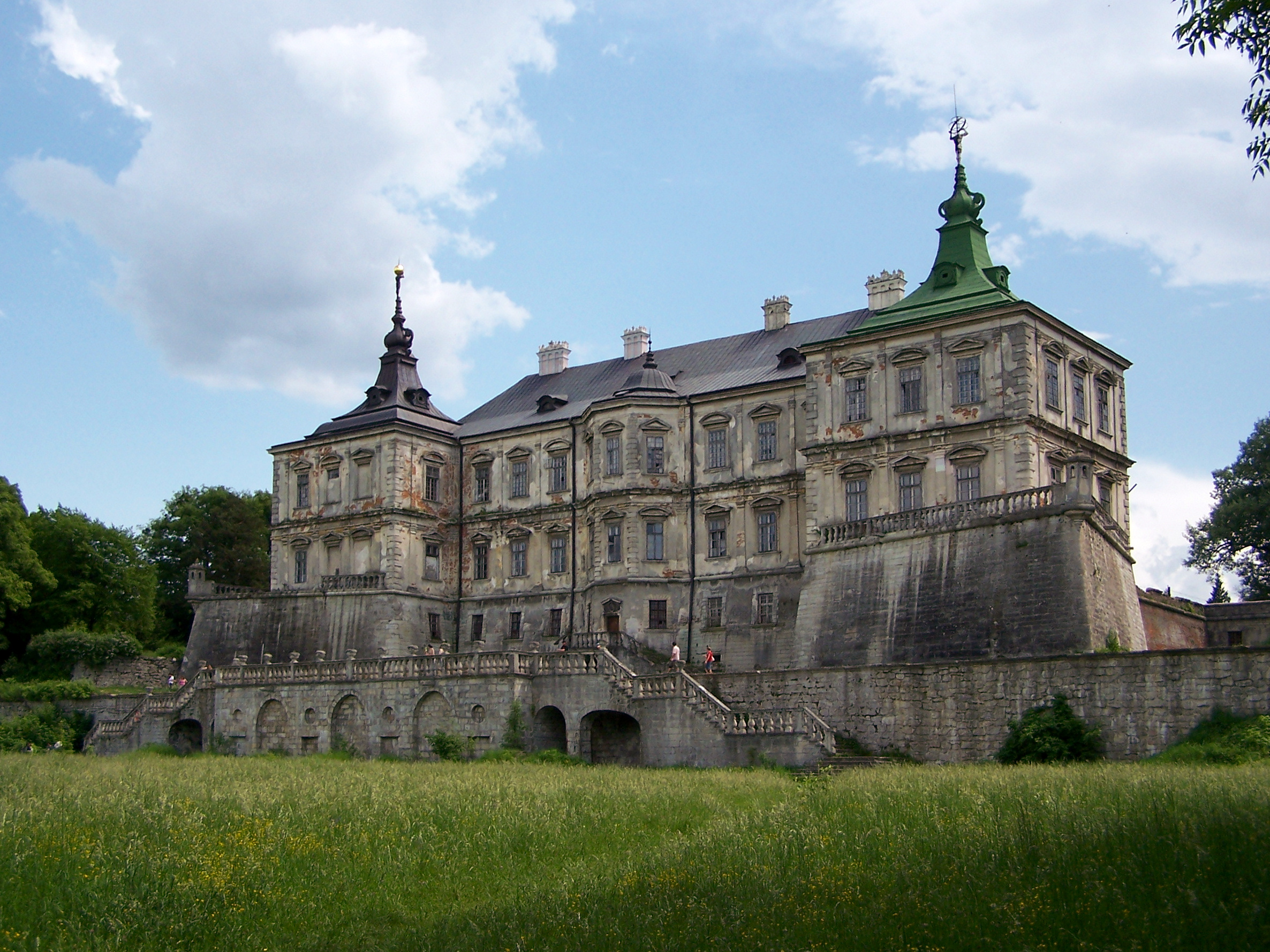
The Pidhirtsi Castle

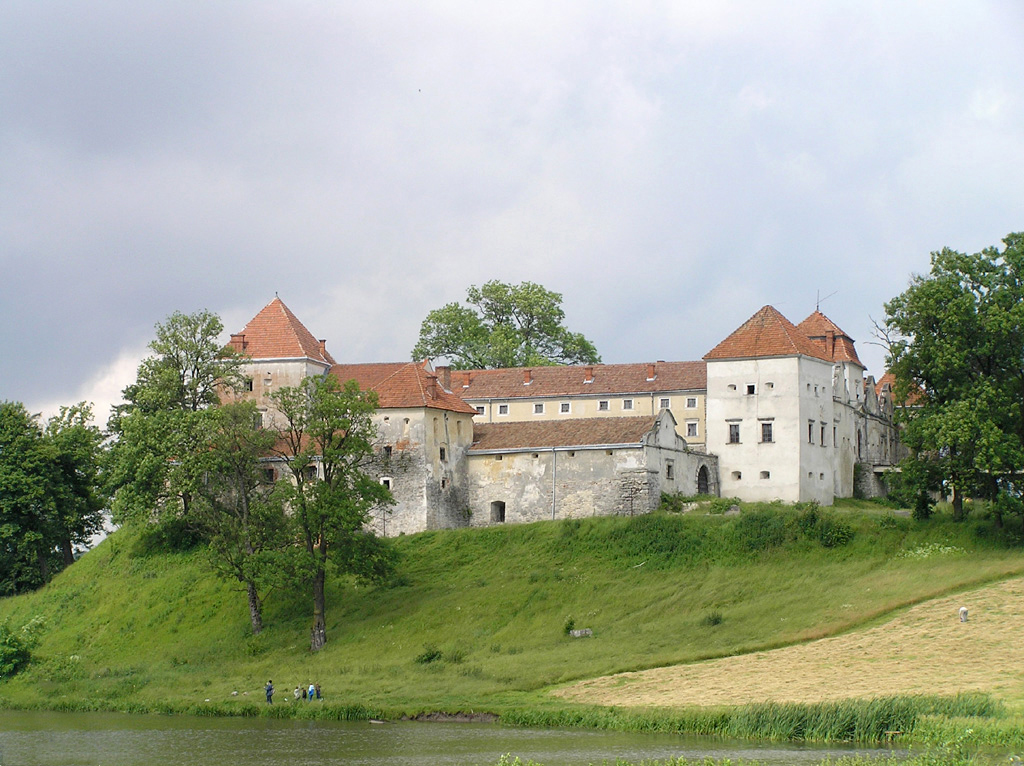
The Svirzh Castle

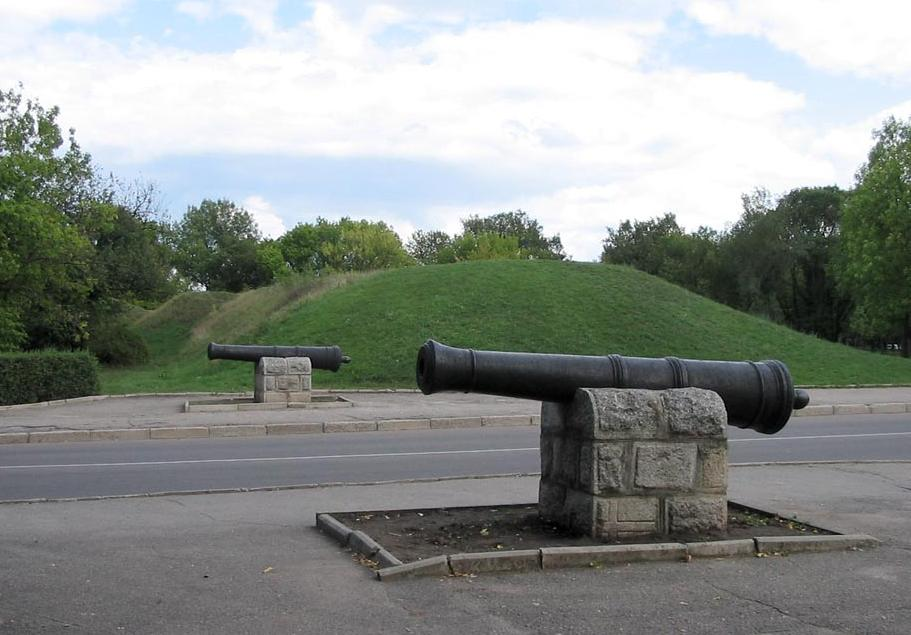
The cannons of St. Elizabeth Fortress in Kropyvnytskyi

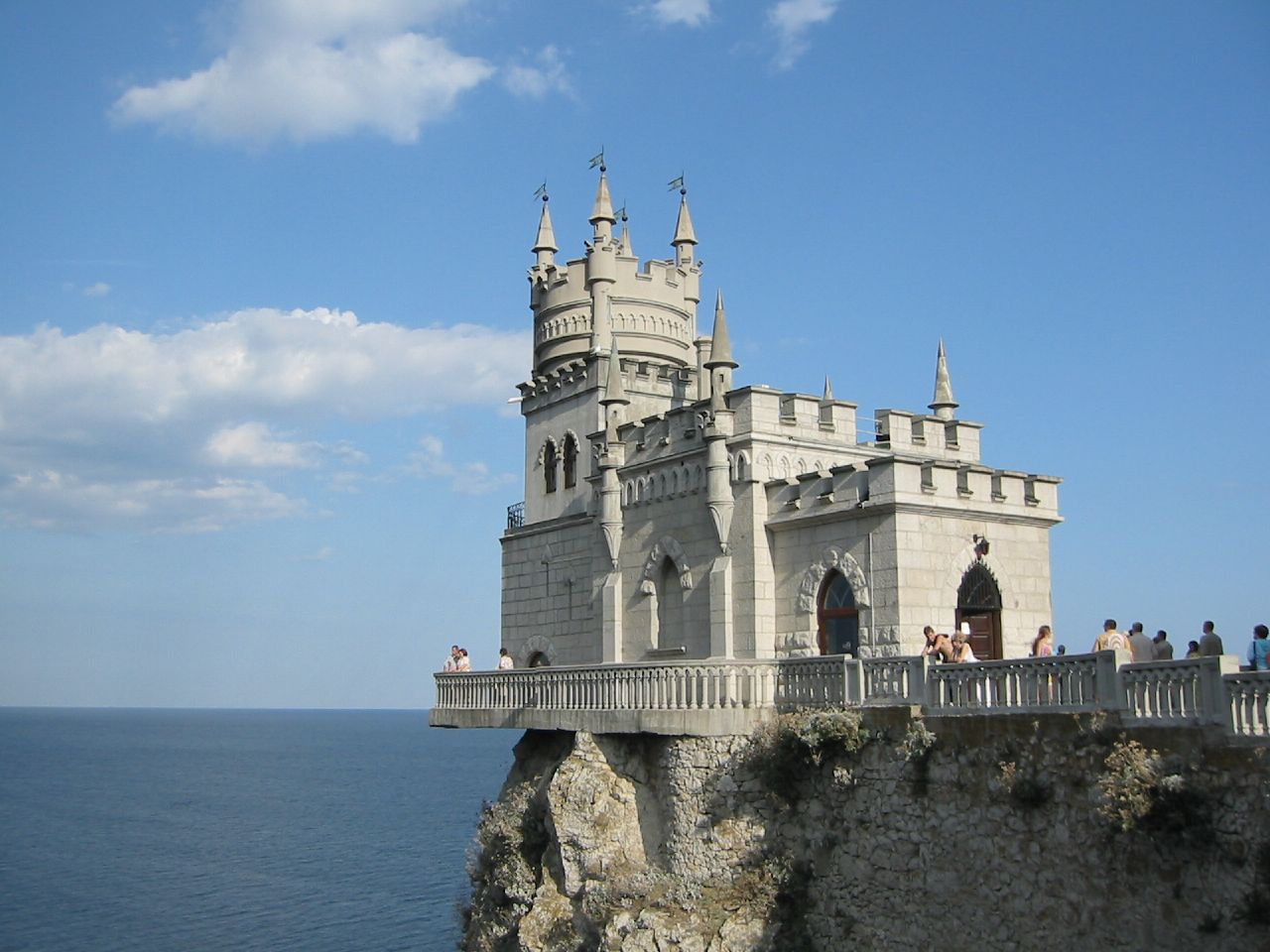
The Swallow's Nest castle near Yalta

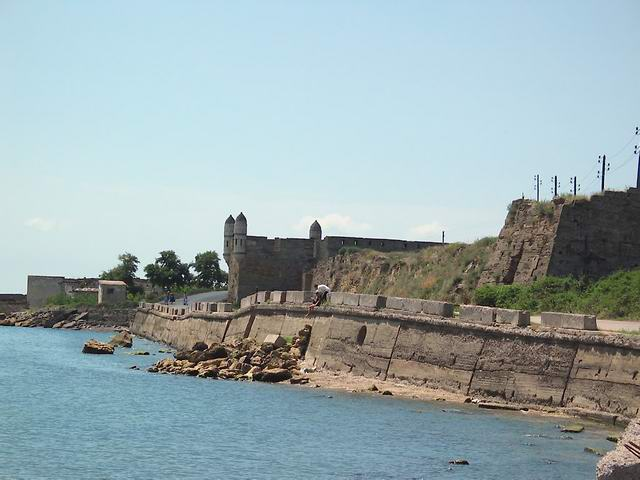
Yeni-Kale Fortress in Kerch

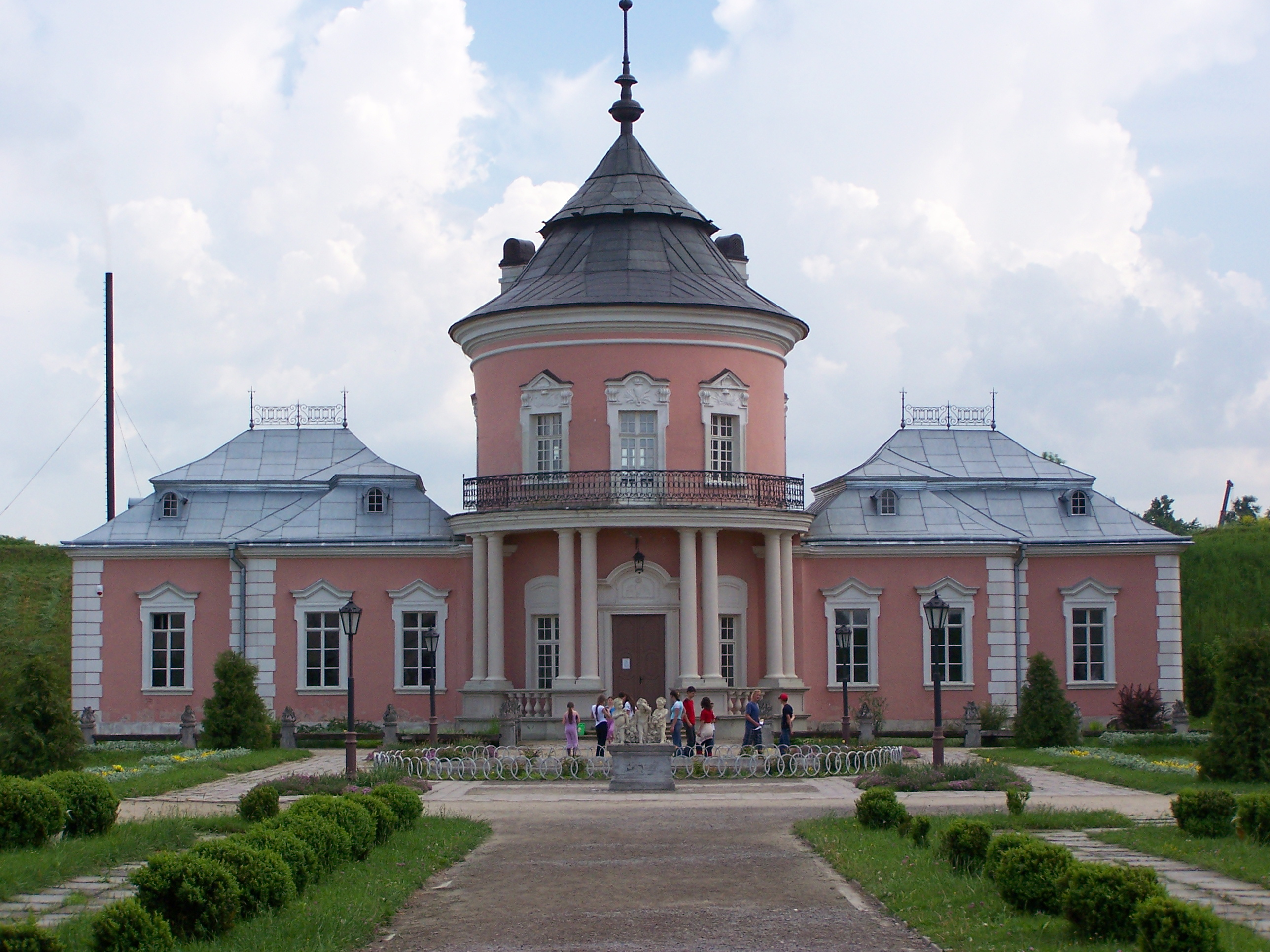
The Zolochiv Castle

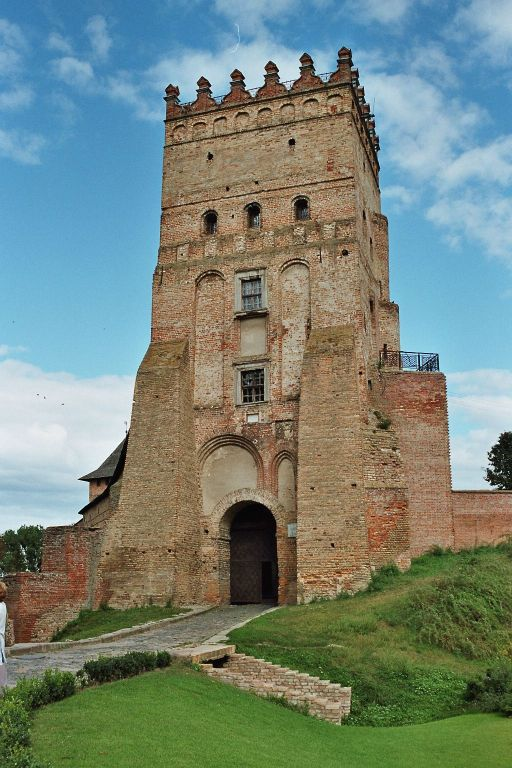
Lubart's Castle (Lutsk Upper Castle)

== A ==
- Akkerman Fortress in Bilhorod-Dnistrovskyi, Odesa Oblast

== B ==
- Bar Castle in Bar, Vinnytsia Oblast
- Bavoriv Castle in Bavoriv, Ternopil Oblast
- Berdychiv Castle in Berdychiv, Zhytomyr Oblast
- Berezhany Castle in Berezhany, Ternopil Oblast
- Bilche-Zolote Castle in Bilche-Zolote, Ternopil Oblast
- Borky Castle in Velyki Birky, Ternopil Oblast
- Borshchiv Castle in Borshchiv, Ternopil Oblast
- Brody Castle in Brody, Lviv Oblast
- The ruined Bronka Castle in Bronka, Zakarpattia Oblast
- Buchach Castle in Buchach, Ternopil Oblast
- Budaniv Castle in Budaniv, Ternopil Oblast

== C ==
- The ruined Chervonohorod Castle in Nyrkiv, Ternopil Oblast
- Chembalo fortress in Balaklava, Sevastopol
- Cherkasy Castle
- The ruined Chernelytsia Castle in Chernelytsia, Ivano-Frankivsk Oblast
- The ruined fortress around Chernihiv Val in Chernihiv
- Chernykhivtsi Castle in Chernykhivtsi, Ternopil Oblast
- Chervonyi Castle in Kopychyntsi, Ternopil Oblast
- Chortkiv Castle in Chortkiv, Ternopil Oblast
- The losts Old Chortkiv Castle in Chortkiv, Ternopil Oblast
- Chufut Kale fortress near Bakhchysarai, Crimea
- Chynadiiovo Castle in Chynadiiovo, Zakarpattia Oblast

== D ==
- Dobromyl Castle in Dobromyl, Lviv Oblast
- Dubno Castle in Dubno, Rivne Oblast

== E ==
- The ruins of Eski Kermen, near Sevastopol
- The ruins of Fortress of St. Elizabeth in Kropyvnytskyi

== G ==
- The Genoese fortress in Feodosia, Crimea
- The Genoese fortress in Sudak, Crimea

== H ==
- Halych Castle in Halych, Ivano-Frankivsk Oblast
- Hlynna Castle in Hlynna, Ternopil Oblast
- Horodok Castle in Horodok, Ternopil Oblast
- Hrymailiv Castle in Hrymailiv, Ternopil Oblast
- Husiatyn Castle in Husiatyn, Ternopil Oblast

== I ==
- Ivano-Frankivsk Castle in Ivano-Frankivsk, Ivano-Frankivsk Oblast
- Iziaslav Castle in northern Khmelnytskyi Oblast

== K ==
- Kamianets-Podilskyi Castle in Kamianets-Podilskyi, Khmelnytskyi Oblast
- Kasperivtsi Castle in Kasperivtsi, Ternopil Oblast
- Khorostkiv Castle in Khorostkiv, Ternopil Oblast
- Khotyn Fortress in Khotyn, Chernivtsi Oblast
- The ruins of Khust Castle in Khust, Zakarpattia Oblast
- Kiliia Castle in Kiliia, Odesa Oblast
- Kremenets Castle in Kremenets, Ternopil Oblast
- Kryvche Castle in Kryvche, Ternopil Oblast
- Kodak fortress in Dnipro, Dnipropetrovsk Oblast
- Kolodne Castle in Kolodne, Ternopil Oblast
- Koniukhy Castle in Koniukhy, Ternopil Oblast
- Korets Castle in Korets, Rivne Oblast
- Kotiv Castle in Kotiv, Ternopil Oblast
- The losts of Kotsiubyntsi Castle in Kotsiubyntsi, Ternopil Oblast
- Kozova Castle in Kozova, Ternopil Oblast
- Kudryntsi Castle in Kudryntsi, Ternopil Oblast
- Kupchyntsi Castle in Kupchyntsi, Ternopil Oblast
- Kuropatnyky Castle in Kuropatnyky, Ternopil Oblast
- Kyiv Fortress in Kyiv, Kyiv Oblast

== L ==
- Lanivtsi Castle in Lanivtsi, Chortkiv Raion, Ternopil Oblast
- Lanivtsi Castle in Lanivtsi, Kremenets Raion, Ternopil Oblast
- Letychiv Fortress in Letychiv, Khmelnytskyi Oblast
- Lviv High Castle in Lviv, Lviv Oblast
- Lutsk Castle in Lutsk, Volyn Oblast, including the Upper Castle (Lubart's Castle) and few intact portions of the Lower Castle
- Lychkivtsi Castle in Lychkivtsi, Ternopil Oblast

== M ==
- Medzhybizh Castle in Medzhybizh
- Mali Zahaitsi Castle in Mali Zahaitsi, Ternopil Oblast
- Melnytsia-Podilska Castle in Melnytsia-Podilska, Ternopil Oblast
- The ruins of Mangup, near Sevastopol
- Monastyryska Castle in Monastyryska, Ternopil Oblast
- Mykulyntsi Castle in Mykulyntsi, Ternopil Oblast

== N ==
- Nevytske Castle in Nevytske, Zakarpattia Oblast
- Nizhyn Castle in Nizhyn, Chernihiv Oblast
- Novosilka Castle in Novosilka, Ternopil Oblast

== O ==
- Okopy Castle in Okopy, Ternopil Oblast
- Olesko Castle, about 75 km from Lviv, Lviv Oblast
- Olyka Castle
- Ostroh Castle in Ostroh, Rivne Oblast
- Ozeriany Castle in Ozeriany, Ternopil Oblast
- Ozerna Castle in Ozerna, Ternopil Oblast

== P ==
- Palanok Castle in Mukachevo, Zakarpattia Oblast
- Peredmirka Castle in Peredmirka, Ternopil Oblast
- Pidhaitsi Castle in Pidhaitsi, Ternopil Oblast
- Pidhirtsi Castle
- Pidzamochok Castle, in Pidzamochok, Ternopil Oblast
- Pomoriany Castle, Lviv Oblast
- Popov Castle in Vasylivka, Zaporizhzhia Oblast
- Probizhna Castle in Probizhna, Ternopil Oblast

== R ==
- Rydomyl Castle in Rydomyl, Ternopil Oblast

== S ==
- Schönborn Palace (Carpathian) in Karpaty, Zakarpattia Oblast
- The losts of Shmankivtsi Castle in Shmankivtsi, Ternopil Oblast
- Shumbar Castle in Shumbar, Ternopil Oblast
- Shumsk Castle in Shumsk, Ternopil Oblast
- The losts of Staryi Zbarazh Castle in Staryi Zbarazh, Ternopil Oblast
- Skala-Podilska Castle in Skala-Podilska, Ternopil Oblast
- Skalat Castle in Skalat, Ternopil Oblast
- The ruins of St. Elizabeth Fortress in Kropyvnytskyi
- Stare Selo Castle in Lviv Oblast
- Staryi Oleksynets Castle in Staryi Oleksynets, Ternopil Oblast
- The losts of Strusiv Castle in Strusiv, Ternopil Oblast
- Svirzh Castle in Svirzh, Lviv Oblast
- Sydoriv Castle in Sydoriv, Ternopil Oblast
- Swallow's Nest Castle in Crimea

== T ==
- Terebovlia Castle in Terebovlia, Ternopil Oblast
- Ternopil Castle in Ternopil
- The ruins of Toky Castle in Toky, Ternopil Oblast
- The losts of Tovste Castle in Tovste, Ternopil Oblast
- Tykhomel Castle in Khmelnytskyi Oblast

== U ==
- Uzhhorod Castle in Uzhhorod, Zakarpattia Oblast

== V ==
- Velyki Birky Castle in Velyki Birky, Ternopil Oblast
- Vynohradiv Castle in Vynohradiv, Zakarpattia Oblast
- Vushhorodok Castle in Vushhorodok, Ternopil Oblast
- Vysichka Castle in Vysichka, Ternopil Oblast

== Y ==
- Yahilnytsia Castle in Nahirianka, Ternopil Oblast
- Yazlovets Castle in Yazlovets, Ternopil Oblast
- Yeni-Kale Fortress in Kerch, Crimea
- Yaniv Castle in Dolyna, Ternopil Raion, Ternopil Oblast

== Z ==
- Zaliztsi Castle in Zaliztsi, Ternopil Oblast
- Zaruddia Castle in Zaruddia, Ternopil Oblast
- Zavaliv Castle in Zavaliv, Ternopil Oblast
- Zbarazh Castle in Zbarazh, Ternopil Oblast
- Zbryzh Castle in Zbryzh, Khmelnytskyi Oblast
- Zhovkva Castle in Zhovkva, Lviv Oblast
- Zolochiv Castle in Zolochiv, Lviv Oblast
- Zolotnyky Castle in Zolotnyky, Ternopil Oblast
- Zolotyi Potik Castle in Zolotyi Potik, Ternopil Oblast
- Zviahel Castle in Zviahel, Zhytomyr Oblast

== See also ==
- List of castles
