= Zbruch Idol =

Ninth-century statue discovered in the 19th century in present-day Ukraine

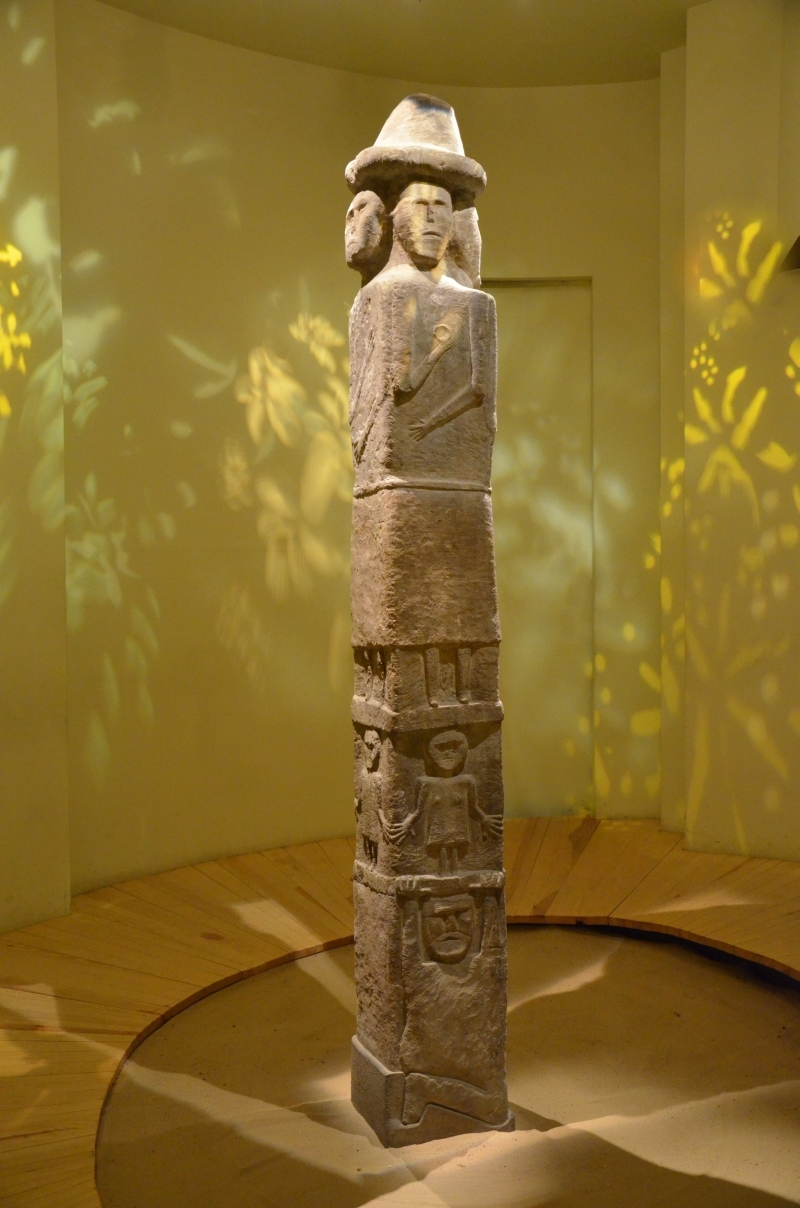
Zbruch Idol, Kraków Archaeological Museum

The Zbruch Idol (Polish: Światowid ze Zbrucza; Ukrainian: Збручанський ідол) is a 9th-century limestone sculpture idol, and one of the few monuments of pre-Christian Slavic beliefs. The pillar was commonly incorrectly associated with the Slavic deity Svetovit (Sviatovid), although current opinions on the exact meaning of all the bas-reliefs and their symbols differ. It is thought that the three tiers of bas-relief represent the three levels of the world, from the bottom underworld, to the middle mortal world and the uppermost, largest, world of heavenly gods.

It is suggested that the sculpture was disposed of or was buried in a pit some time after the baptism of Kievan Rus', and acceptance of Christianity in Poland in 966, like various buried idols in Kyiv and Novgorod. In the 19th century, when the Zbruch River (a left tributary of the Dniester) changed its bed, the area where the pillar was buried became submerged. It was discovered during a drought near the village of Lychkivtsi, just north of Husiatyn, in 1848. The statue is now on display in the Archaeological Museum of Kraków in Poland, with exact copies located in a number of museums.

In 2011, Aleksey Komar and Natalia Khamaiko suggested that the sculpture is a Romantic-era fake produced by Tymon Zaborowski (whose estate was located near the place where the statue was found) and that it was inspired by a detailed descripion of Svetovit's idol on Cape Arkona in the Gesta Danorum. It has also been suggested that the idol was made by the Kipchaks/Cumans rather than the Slavs (see balbals).

== Description ==
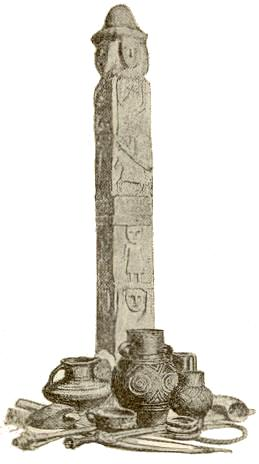
Zbruch Idol

The Zbruch Idol is a four-sided pillar of grey limestone, 2.67 m (8.8 ft) in height, and has three tiers of reliefs engraved upon each of the four sides. The lower tier is 67 cm (26 in); the middle tier is 40 cm (16 in); and the top tier is 167 cm (66 in). It is possible that during the 1848 excavation of the monument its lower layer was broken off and lost. The reliefs are in rather poor condition, though some traces of original polychrome were found in the 1960s. The reliefs depict the following characters:

- Three sides of the lowest tier show a kneeling, bearded entity who appears to support the upper tier on his hands; the fourth side is blank.
- The middle tier shows a smaller entity with extended arms on all four sides. Only one of four sides has an entity with a tiny "child" figure.
- The four sides of the uppermost tier have the largest figures of the idol, with four faces united beneath a tall rounded hat. Each of the sides has a distinct attribute: a ring or a bracelet; a drinking horn, or horn of plenty; a sword and a horse; and an eroded solar symbol. Because female breasts may be discerned on several sides of the uppermost tier, some scholars interpret the deity as androgynous. The hats on the heads of the upper figures have parallels in the Sebezh idols and the Belozersk idol from Russia.

== Discovery ==
The statue was discovered in August 1848 in the village of Lychkivtsi (Polish: Liczkowce) in Galicia (then in the Austrian Empire, now in Ukraine), during a drought that made the bottom of the river visible. The owner of the village, Konstanty Zaborowski, brother of the late poet, Tymon, donated it to Polish Count Mieczysław Ludwik Potocki, who in 1850 reported it to the Kraków Scientific Society. Potocki put forth a conjecture that the statue might represent Svetovid. Potocki donated it to the Jagiellonian University under the condition that it would be noted that the statue of Svetovid comes from him. Initially kept in the library of the Jagiellonian University, in 1858 it was moved to the temporary exhibition of antiquities in the Lubomirski family palace and then to the headquarters of the Kraków Scientific Society. However only in 1950 it was placed on permanent exhibition. Since 1968 it has been kept in the Kraków Archaeological Museum.

In 1984, archaeologists Irina Rusanova and Boris Timoshchuk explored the banks of the Zbruch River near the site of the idol's discovery. They attempted to trace the exact spot where the idol could have stood and, based on their findings, suggested that the "Zbruch pagan cult center" might have been still active in the 12th and 13th centuries (that is, well after the Baptism of Rus). These ideas have drawn much criticism.

== Identification controversy ==
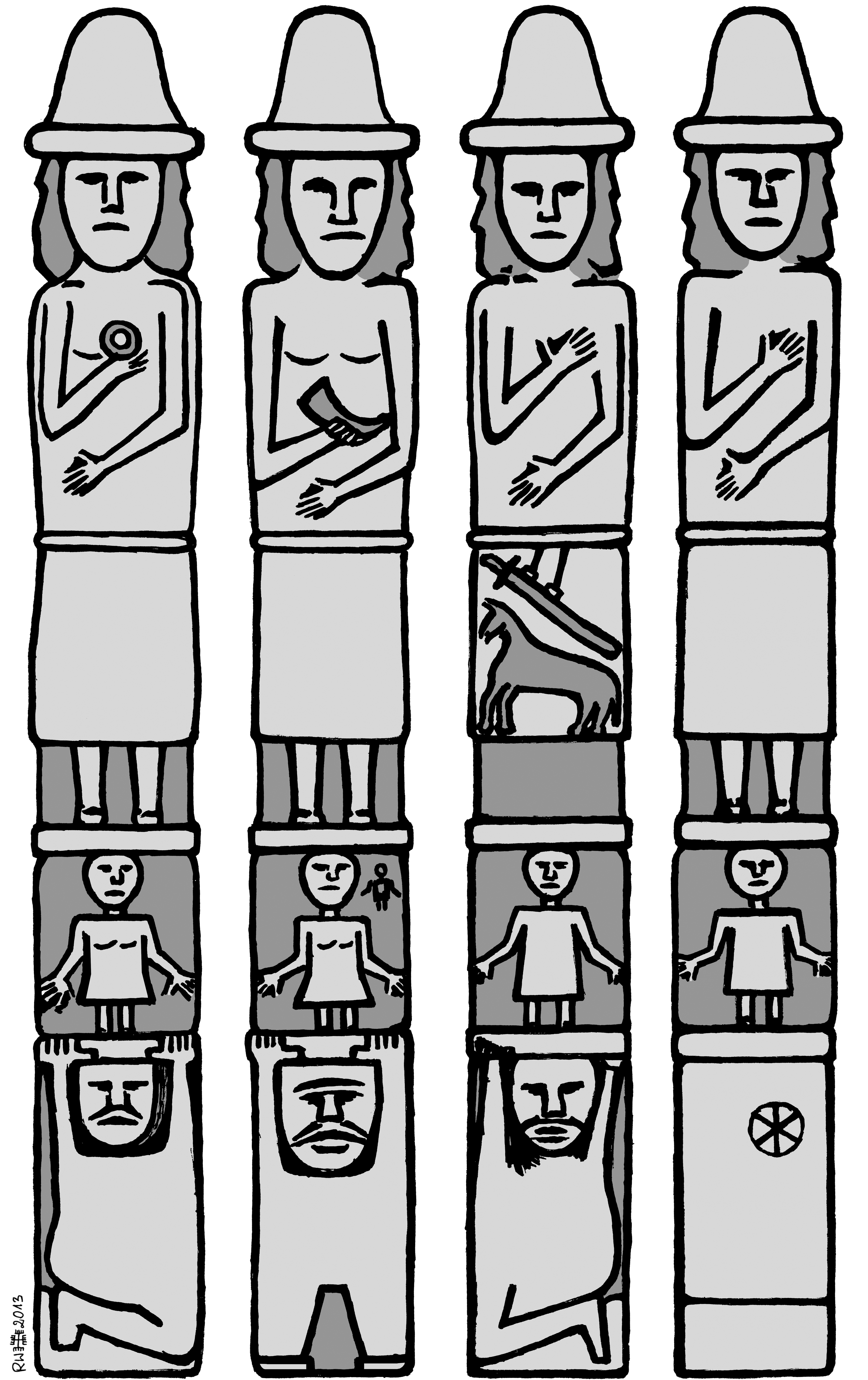
Presentation of the reliefs adorning each side of the idol

Ever since the discovery of the monument there has been debate about what exactly the idol represents.

Andrei Famintsyn in his 1884 work "Deities of the Ancient Slavs" argued against Lelewel's theory, and instead claimed that the Zbruch pillar is a representation of a single deity and that all four sides of each tier represented one entity. As was first suggested by Count Potocki, he identified the deity as a representation of the Slavic four-headed god Swiatowid, until then primarily associated with the island of Rügen, but now understood to be pan-Slavic. The reasoning was that historical sources mentioned the deity of Rügen as being kept in a wooden temple together with a sacred sword, a drinking horn and a horse. Famintsyn was also the first to recognize the three-tiered structure as being related to the three levels of the world, linking it to the Slavic deity Triglav.

The identification of the deity with Swiatowid was also supported by Gabriel Leńczyk, who was also the first to identify the eroded solar symbol on the side, previously believed to be without attributes. Another theory was presented by Henryk Łowmiański, who in his 1979 monograph on the religion of Slavs suggested that the idol was altogether non-Slavic, as it was made of stone, and not of wood, which was the basic construction material of the Slavs, but the legends of Swiatowid exist among all Slavic cultures nonetheless.

Boris Rybakov in his 1987 work Paganism of Ancient Rus, while noting the phallic shape of the upper figures' hats, argued that four sides of the top tier represent four different Slavic gods, two female and two male, with their corresponding middle-tier entities always of the opposite gender. In Rybakov's hypothesis, the male deity with the horse and sword is the Lightning god Perun, the female with the horn of plenty is Mokosh, the female with the ring is Lada, and the male deity with the solar symbol, above the empty underworld, is Dažbog. Further, Rybakov suggests the underworld deity as Veles.

Rybakov also claimed the side with the female figure holding a horn as the front of the idol, based on the bottom-tier figure, which is shown with legs as if seen from head-on, the two adjoining sides showing the legs from the side, and the fourth side left blank. Finally, Rybakov believes that the idol's overall phallic shape is meant to unite all of the smaller figures as a single overarching all seeing larger deity, Rod.

== Popular culture ==
A reproduction of the idol figures in the 2022 film The Northman.

A copy of the sculpture was installed by Wawel Castle in Kraków (the photograph). It is a stone carving created during 1963–1968. A number of other replicas are installed in other countries as well.

== Bibliography ==
- (in German) Weigel. Bildwerke aus altslawischer Zeit. Archiw fur Anthropologie, 1882, Bd. XXI
