= Lychkivtsi Castle =

Castle in Lychkivtsi, Ternopil Oblast, Ukraine

- Личковецький замок
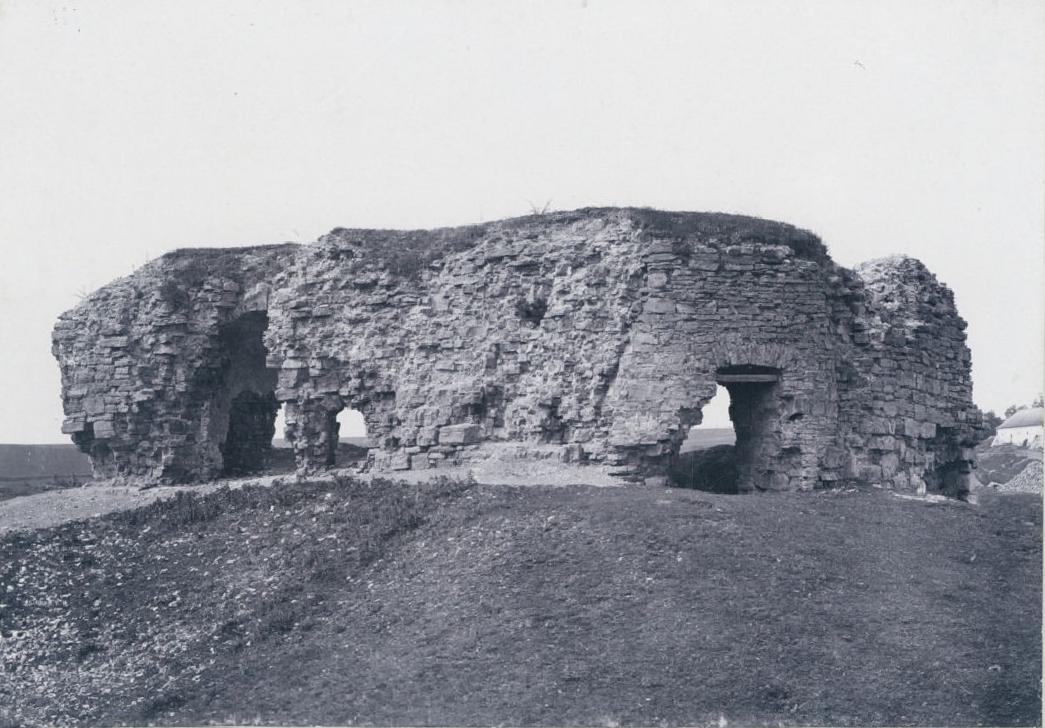

General information
- Location: Lychkivtsi, Chortkiv Raion, Ternopil Oblast
- Country: Ukraine
- Coordinates: 49°08′50.9″N 26°09′11.5″E

The Lychkivtsi Castle (Ukrainian: Личковецький замок, romanized: Lychkovets'kyi zamok) is located in Lychkivtsi, Ternopil Oblast, Ukraine. The castle built by Kalinowski.

== History ==
There was a castle in the village, which was repeatedly attacked during Tartar incursions into the Polish lands. The structure was still inhabited in the early 19th century. At the end of the 19th century, remnants of the castle's walls were visible next to the Roman Catholic Church, which, together with the parish priest's rectory, was built from the demolished walls of the castle. Small fragments of the stone fortifications remain today. They have been rebuilt into an open chapel.
