= Kamianets-Podilskyi Castle =

Castle and fortress in Kamianets-Podilskyi, Ukraine

- Кам'янець-Подільський замок
- Khmelnytskyi Oblast
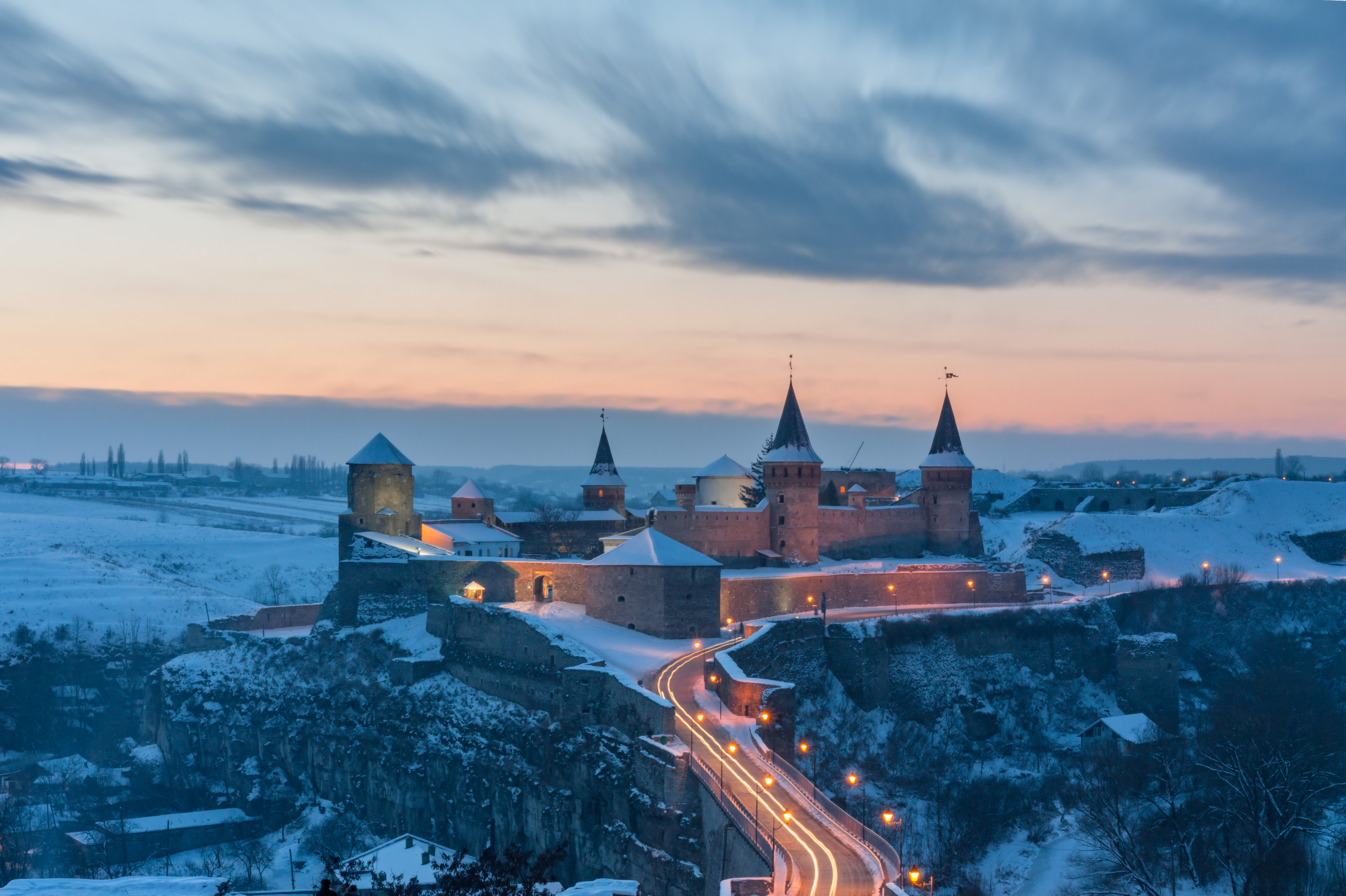
- Seven of the castle's original twelve towers dominate over the surrounding Smotrych River canyon landscape.

Site information
- Type: Castle

Location
- Coordinates: 48°40′24″N 26°33′45″E

Garrison information
- Designations

Immovable Monument of National Significance of Ukraine
- Official name: Фортеця (Fortress)
- Type: Architecture
- Reference no.: 220073

The Kamianets-Podilskyi Castle (Ukrainian: Кам'янець-Подільська фортеця, romanized: Kamianets-Podilska fortetsia; Polish: twierdza w Kamieńcu Podolskim; Lithuanian: Podolės Kameneco tvirtovė) is a former Ruthenian-Lithuanian castle and a later three-part Polish fortress located in the historic city of Kamianets-Podilskyi, Ukraine, in the historic region of Podilia in the western part of the country. Its name is attributed to the root word 'kamin', from the Slavic word for 'stone'.

Historical accounts date Kamianets-Podilskyi Castle to the early 14th century, although recent archaeological evidence has proved human existence in the area back to the 12th or 13th century. Initially built to protect the bridge connecting the city with the mainland, the castle sits on top of a peninsula carved out by the winding Smotrych River, forming a natural defense system for Kamianets-Podilskyi's historic Old Town neighborhood.

Its location on a strategic transport crossroad in Podilia made the castle a prime target for foreign invaders, who rebuilt the castle to suit their own needs, adding to its multicultural architectural diversity. Specifically, the complex consists of the Old Town fortified by King Casimir IV, the Old Castle rebuilt by Kings Sigismund I and Stephen Báthory, and the New Castle founded by Kings Sigismund III and Władysław IV. However, in spite of the many architectural and engineering changes to the original structure, the castle still forms a coherent architectural design, being one of the few medieval constructions in modern-day Ukraine that is relatively well preserved.

Along with the Old Town neighborhood, the castle is listed as part of the National Historical-Architectural Reserve "Kamianets" and the National Environmental Park "Podilski Tovtry". The complex is a candidate UNESCO World Heritage Site, nominated in 1989 by the Ukrainian representatives, and also one of the Seven Wonders of Ukraine. Today, Kamianets-Podilskyi Castle is the most recognized landmark of the city, serving as an important regional and national tourist attraction.

== History ==
=== Foundation and early history ===
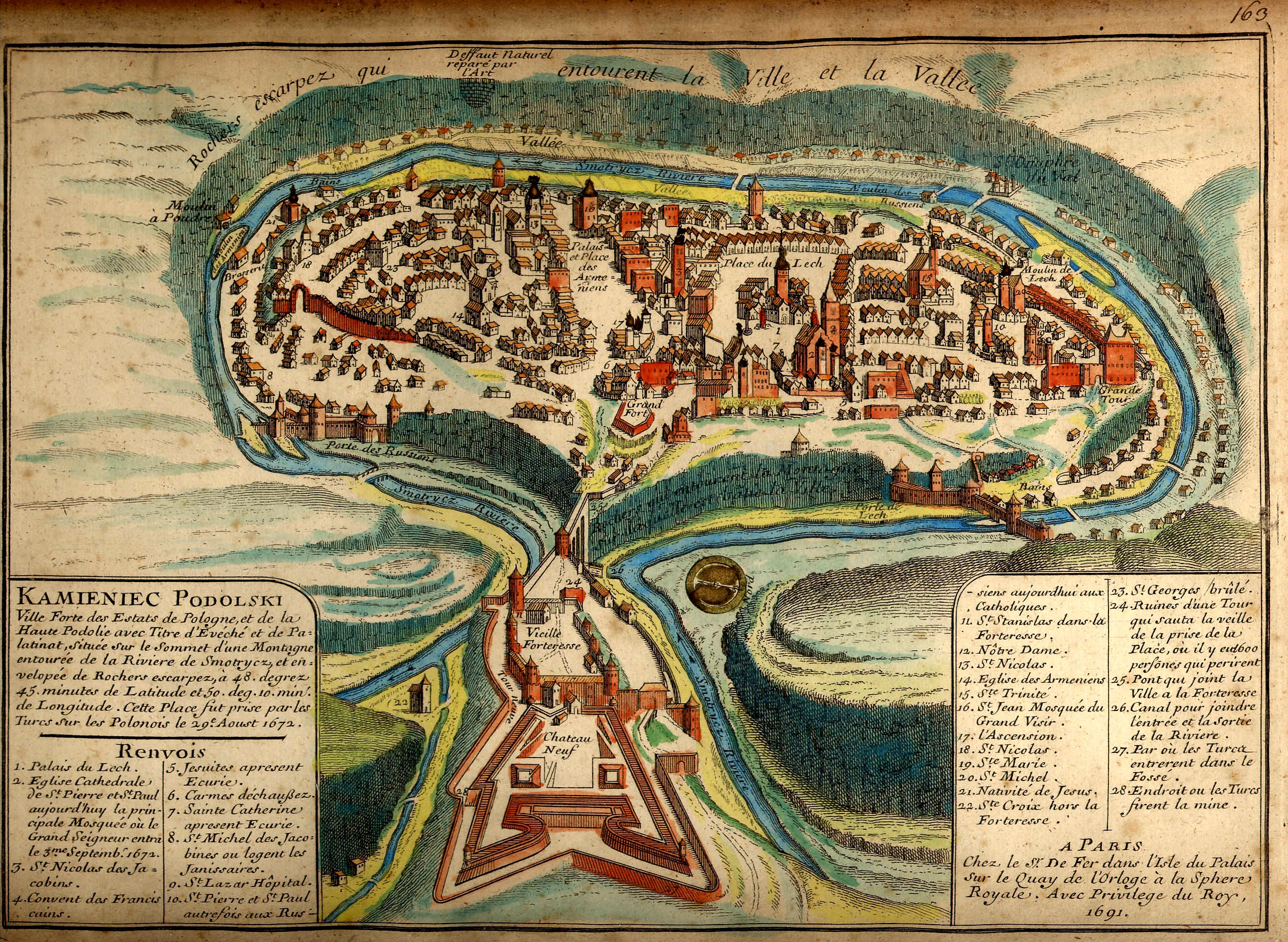
A 1691 French-language map depicting the Kamianets Old Town neighborhood and castle

Traditionally, Kamianets-Podilskyi Castle was thought to have been founded during the second half of the 14th century, as the first accurate historical accounts of the castle date back to the mid-14th century, when most of the territories of western Rus' were under control of the Grand Duchy of Lithuania. A written document by Prince Yuriy Koriatovych in 1374, for example, mentions that the Magdeburg rights would be presented to Kamianets inside the castle. Archaeological excavations during the 1960s, however, provided contrasting evidence suggesting that the castle might date back even earlier to the end of the 12th or the beginning of the 13th centuries. It is also clear from historical and archaeological evidence that an earthen fortress existed in the area during the time of the East Slavic state of Kievan Rus', but not on the same site as the current castle.

The castle was outdated but remained vital to the defense of Kamianets and nearby trade routes; as a result, the voivode of Kraków, Spytek of Melsztyn, began modernizing the complex at the turn of the 15th century. During the reconstruction, the old towers were renovated and ten new towers were added. A century and a half later, the castle was updated again, this time by military engineer and architect Hiob Bretfus, who built the New Western and Eastern Towers, the castle's eastern wall and an underground gallery, as well as the Full Gates and housing for the town's starosta community. (Note: In the Polish–Lithuanian Commonwealth, starosta referred to a royal official.)

=== Continuous attacks by invaders ===
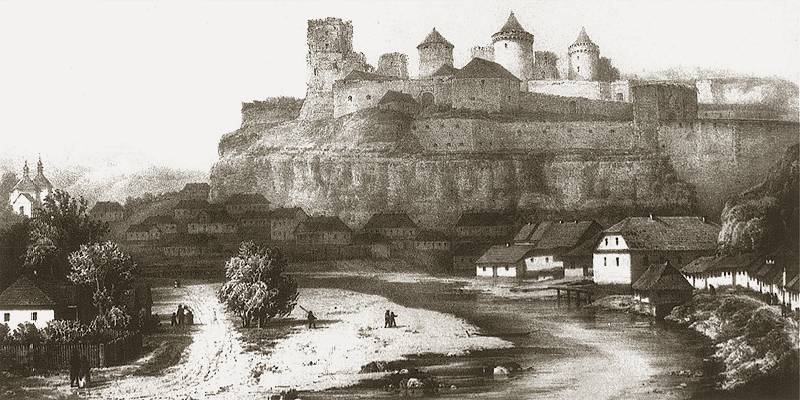
An old lithograph (circa 1850) depicting the castle walls with a settlement underneath, which still exists today

During the mid-14th to mid-15th centuries, Kamianets-Podilskyi Castle was located on one of the main frontiers of the Polish–Lithuanian Commonwealth. From 1434 until its annexation by the Russian Empire in 1793, the castle played a major role in the defense against the oncoming Cossack, Ottoman, and Tatar invasions; from the 15th through 17th centuries, the castle was attacked by Tatar hordes a total of 51 times. The Tatar invasions of 1448, 1451, 1509, and 1528, as well as the Ottoman siege of 1533, caused damage to both the castle and the city but all of these invasions were successfully repelled.

Kamianets-Podilskyi Castle played an important role during the Khmelnytsky Uprising between 1648 and 1654, when the Zaporozhian Cossacks led by Hetman Bohdan Khmelnytsky, allied themselves with the Crimean Tatars and the local Ukrainian peasantry against the Polish–Lithuanian Commonwealth's army and militia. During the uprising, the castle was unsuccessfully besieged by local Cossacks and insurgents led by Commander Maksym Kryvonis. In 1651, the castle was then subject to another Cossack siege led by otaman Ivan Bohun, before an unexpected counterattack by Polish insurgents under commanders Aleksandrenka and Chuika re-established the Polish presence in the area and relieved the siege. A 60,000 force army led by Khmelnytsky himself reasserted Cossack control over the castle in 1652. Just one year later, the castle was attacked yet again, this time by a 40,000 strong Crimean Tatar horde.

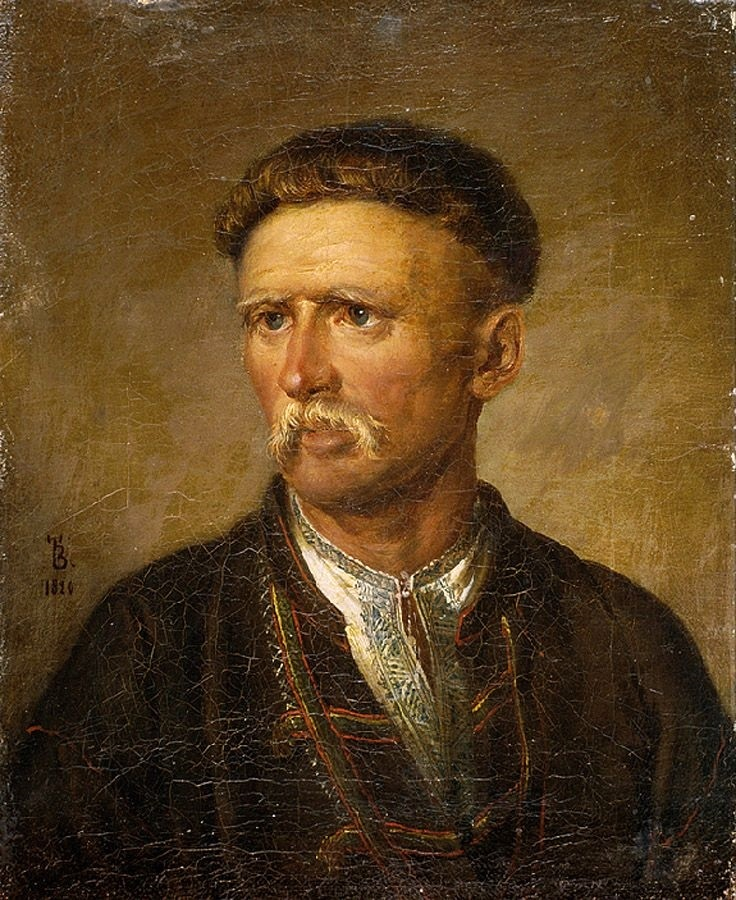
Ustym Karmaliuk. Vasily Tropinin, c. 1820s oil on canvas. State Tretyakov Gallery, Moscow.

In the beginning of August 1672, a 300,000 Ottoman force led by Sultan Mehmed IV and a 40,000 combined force of Tatars and Cossacks led by Hetman Petro Doroshenko laid siege to the castle. After conducting negotiations with their attackers, the city's leaders surrendered control of the fortress to the Ottomans on August 18. The castle plays an important role in a novel by Henryk Sienkiewicz, "Pan Wołodyjowski," as during the siege in that fictional novel, in a sign of protest, the fortress's Commandant Michał Wołodyjowski (fictional character) and Major Ketling (fictional character) blew up the castle's remaining gunpowder, killing themselves along with 800 defenders. For 27 years after the attack, the fortress served as the base of Ottoman rule in Podolia. The 1699 Karlov Peace Treaty saw the return of Polish control over the area after the Ottoman Empire ceded its control in the area.

=== From a castle to a prison ===
From the beginning of the 18th century, Kamianets-Podilskyi Castle had lost its defensive role, and was used more as a military prison than a military fortification. Numerous people were executed or held captive in the prison, including Cossack starshynas (officers), haidamakas, (Note: Haidamakas were paramilitary bands of local Cossacks and peasantry, set up to fight against the Polish nobility in right-bank Ukraine.) and even the three-year-old pretender to the Polish throne, Stanisław August Poniatowski.

Even though it had lost its defensive role, it was one of the strongest fortresses in the Crown of the Kingdom of Poland up until the Second Partition of Poland of April 21, 1793. when both Kamianets-Podilskyi Castle and the city were transferred to the sovereignty of the Russian Empire. On the same day, the castle's commandant gave up the key to the castle and swore allegiance to the empire in the city's cathedral. One hundred and one artillery cannons later saluted the commandant's decision inside the castle. During the French invasion of Russia of 1812, the Russian Imperial Army was stationed in the castle. In 1815, Konstantin Batyushkov, who later became a well-known poet and writer, was stationed as an officer in the castle. In 1846, poet Vladimir Raevsky was stationed in the castle, during which time he established a pro-Decembrist organization of progressively-minded army officers.

From 1816 until 1914, the fortress was converted from a military prison into a jail for debtors, criminals and political prisoners. In 1831, Russian lexicologist Vladimir Dal worked in the castle, at the time writing a dictionary of the Russian language. The castle was the center of the anti-feudalism movement in the Podolia during the 19th century led by the Patriotic War of 1812 cavalry veteran Ustym Karmaliuk (1787–1835), who is now regarded by Ukrainians as a national folk hero.

=== Museum and conservation ===
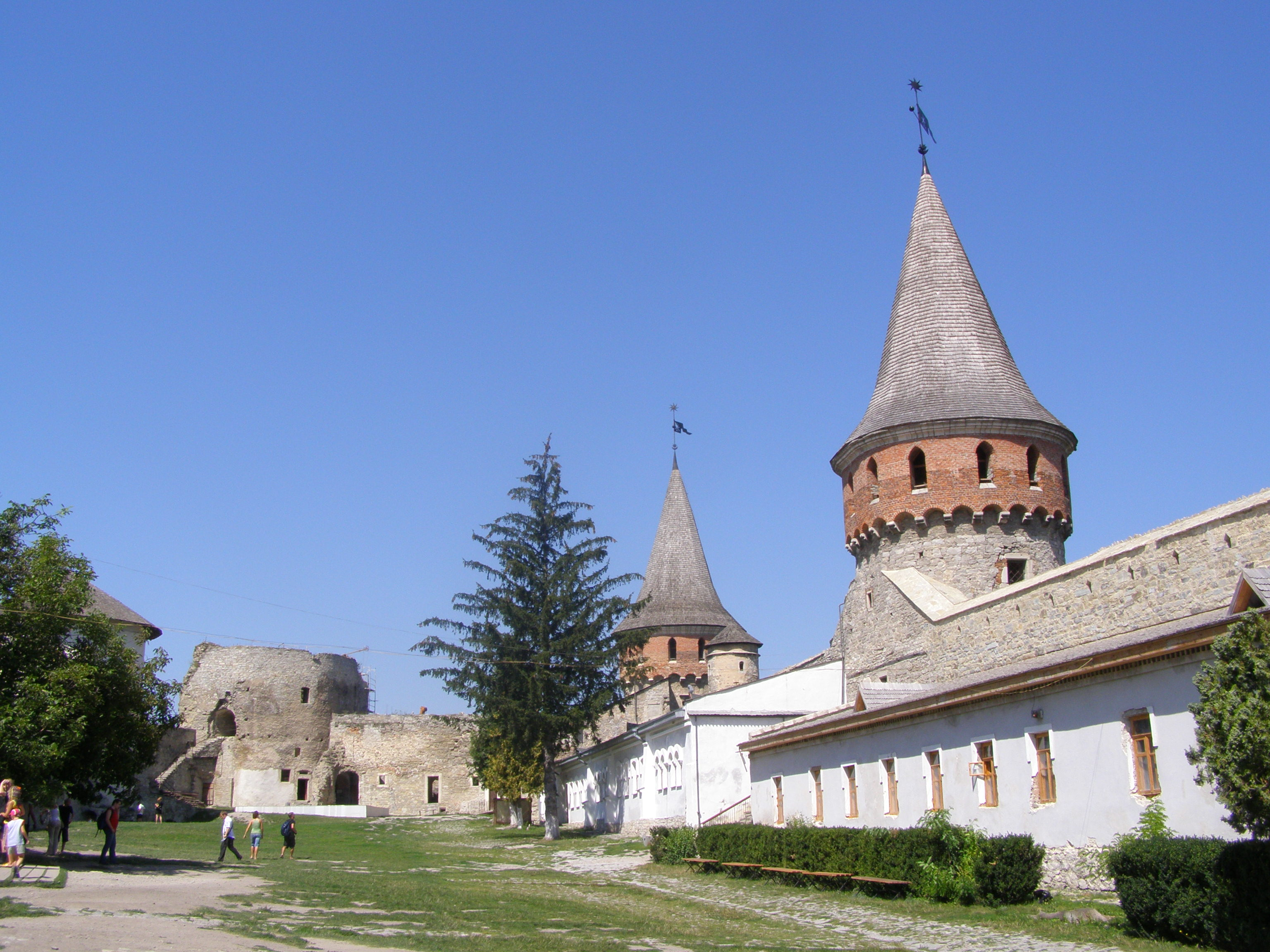
Interior courtyard and view of the castle's museum

After a series of political changes following the 1905 revolution, political parties and organizations were allowed by the law throughout the Russian Empire. In 1906, a total of 67 political organizations were based in the castle. Among them was the Russian Social Democratic Labour Party's newspaper "Iskra" (Spark). A decree issued by the Sovnarkom of the Ukrainian Soviet Socialist Republic in 1928 declared Kamianets-Podilskyi Castle complex a historical-cultural preserve. During the late 1930s, plans were made to turn the castle into a museum, and reconstruction work on the buildings was started in 1937. Among the museum attractions added was a scene depicting Karmaliuk in the castle's prison cell in the Pope's Tower, where he was kept during his imprisonment in the castle. Visitor numbers for the castle during the 1930s reached 300,000 a year.

In 1947, Kamianets-Podilskyi Castle was placed on the all-Union list of historic preserves. A memorial plaque and a bas-relief resembling Karmaliuk was erected near the Karmaliuk exposition on April 18, 1958. Restorational and archaeological works have been conducted at the castle since 1962 under the supervision of architects Y. Plamenytska and A. Tyupych. On May 18, 1977, the National Historic-Architectural Reserve "Kamianets" was established. On September 13, 1989, the Ukrainian SSR Government placed Kamianets-Podilskyi Castle and Old Town on the tentative list of UNESCO World Heritage Sites.

In 2004, the "Kamianets" reserve was upgraded to that of a national preservation district. On August 21, 2007, the complex was declared one of the Seven Wonders of Ukraine when it came in 3rd place in a nationwide competition. A severe storm on August 1, 2011, partially destroyed the New Western Tower; the city mayor's office didn't deny that the tower's structural integrity was weakened during its last reconstruction in 2007, paving the way for its collapse just four years later.

== Architecture ==
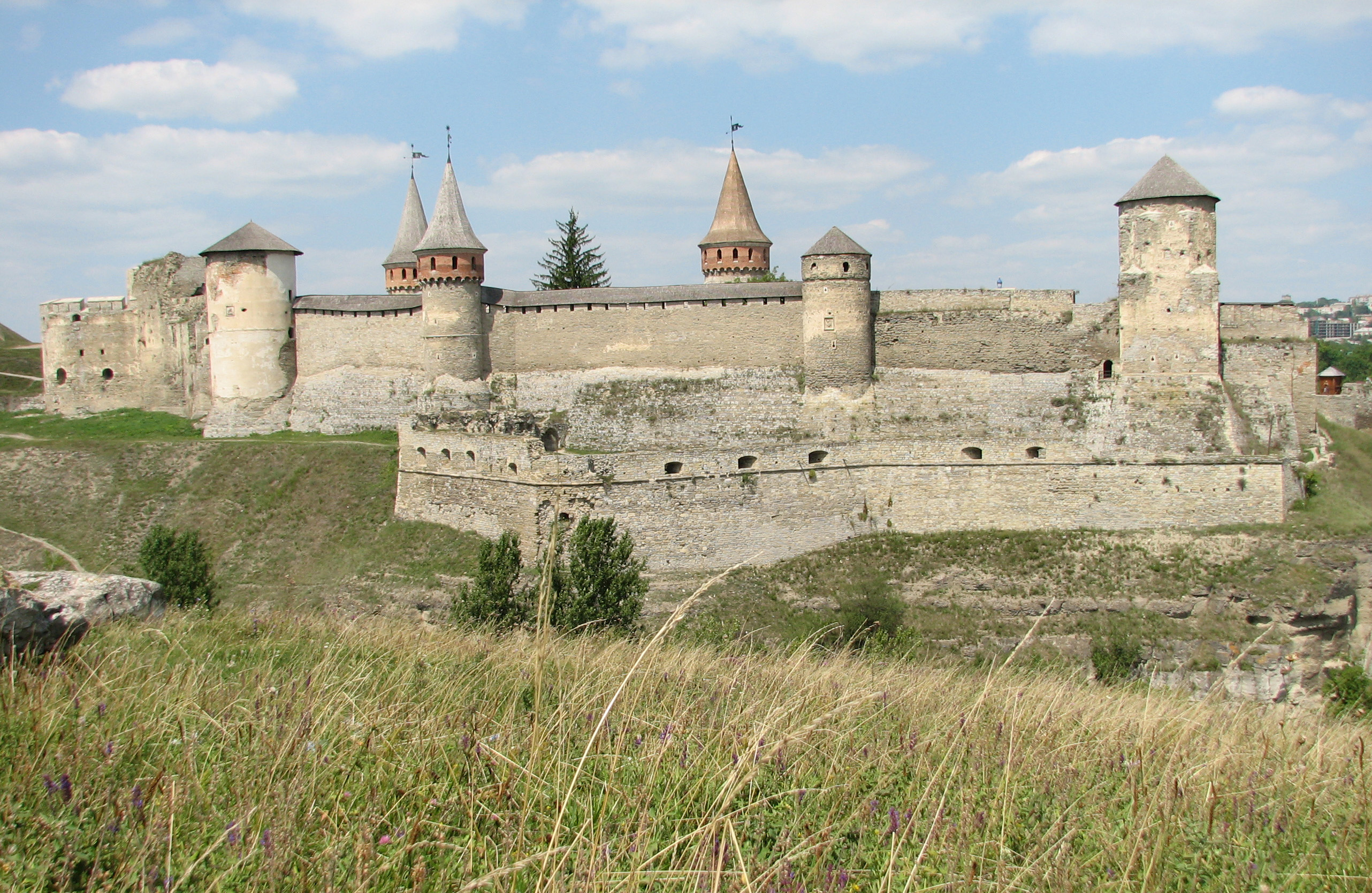
View of the castle from southwest with the Old Castle (top left) and New Castle (bottom right)

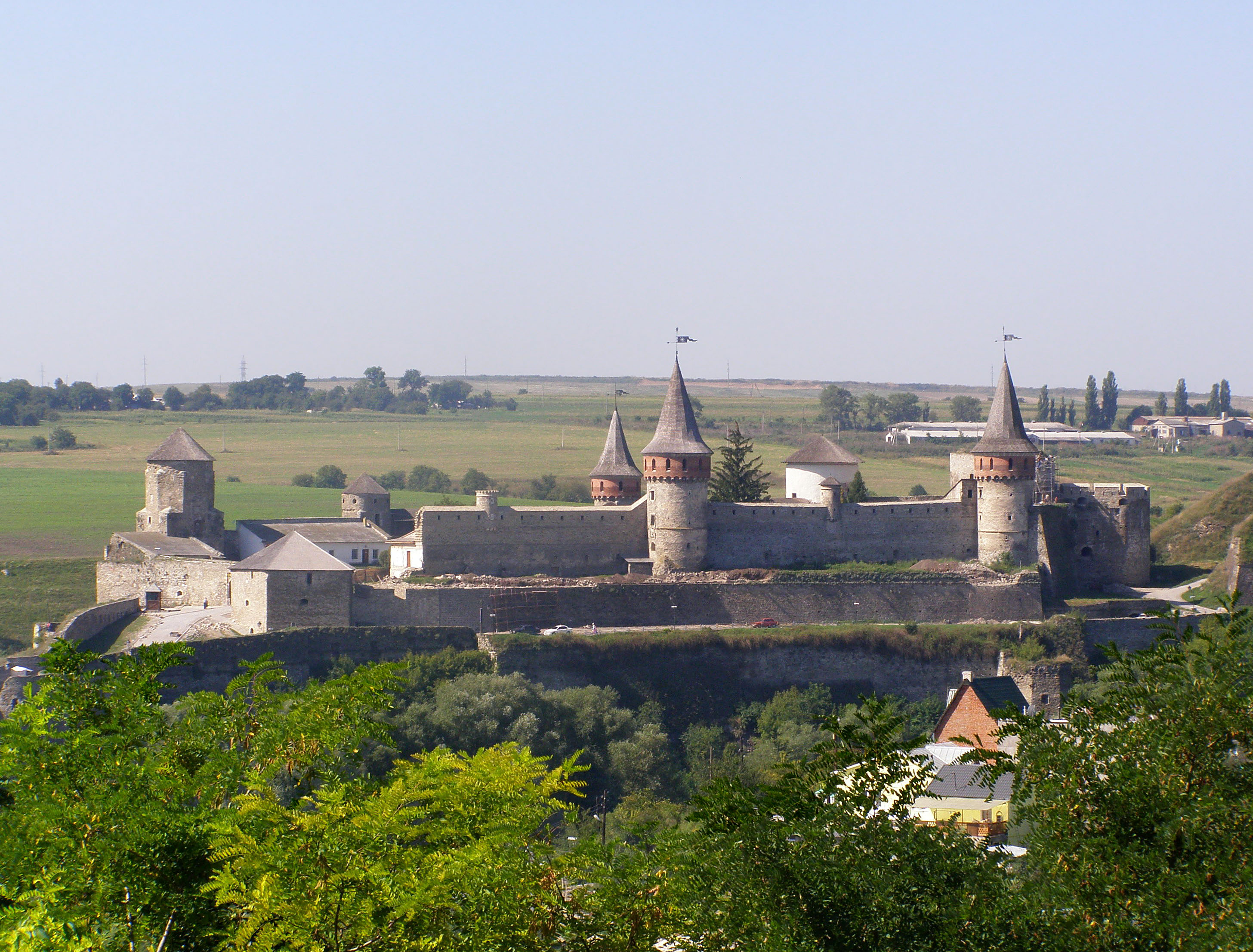
The Kamianets-Podilskyi Castle towers and the surrounding Podolian landscape

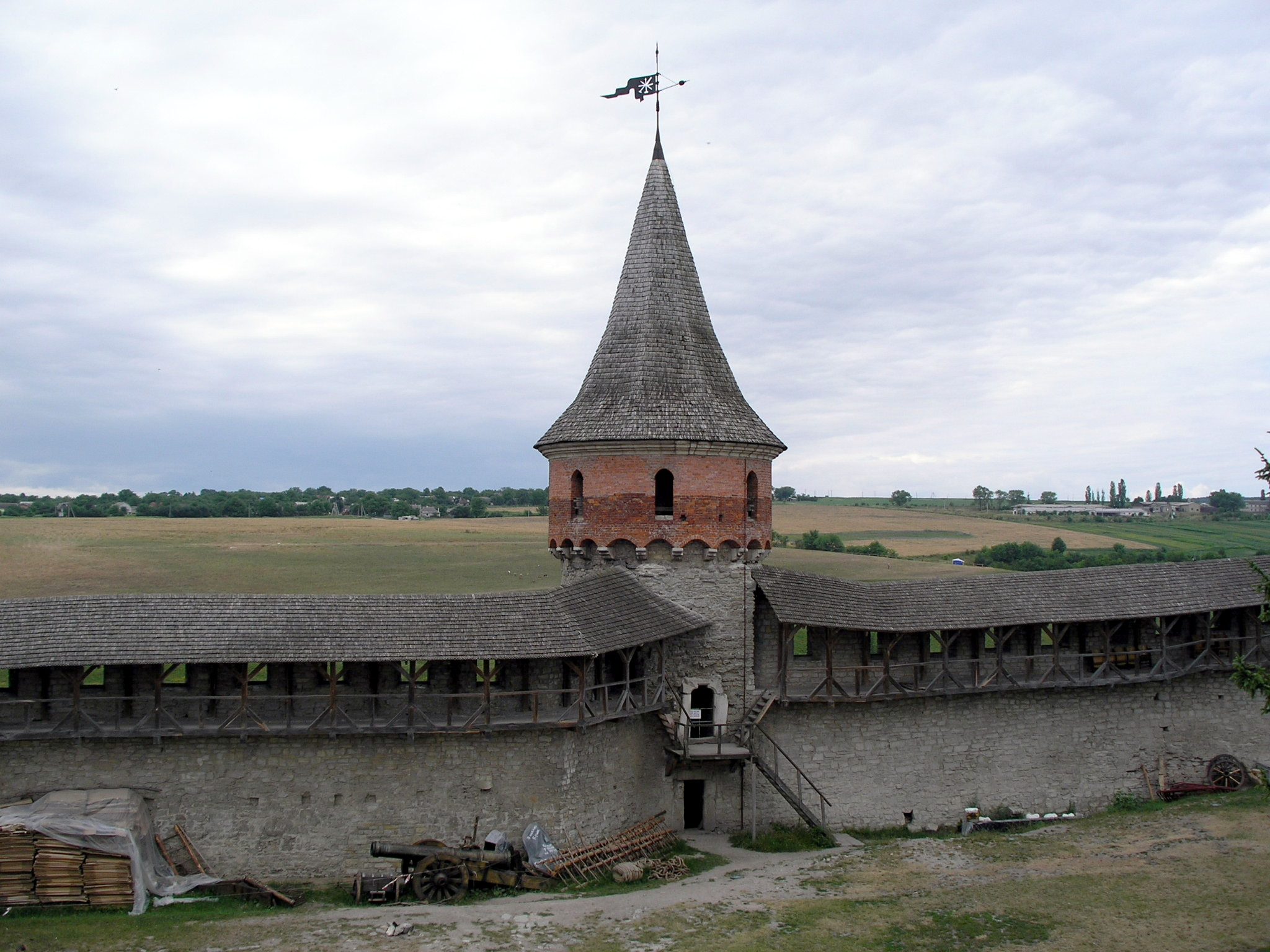
The Tenchynska Tower (14th-16th centuries) and covered walkways leading around the perimeter of the walls

Kamianets-Podilskyi Castle rests on a limestone formation surrounded by the Smotrych River canyon. Consequently, its foundations were built using limestone, as well as local and imported brick and stone. Indeed, the castle's name is attributed to the root kamin', from the Slavic word for stone. The two main parts of the castle, the Old Castle (Ukrainian: Старий замок) and the New Castle (Ukrainian: Новий замок), were built during different periods. The Old Castle defended the approach from Kamianets-Podilskyi's Old Town, and was constructed to protect against direct assaults from enemy soldiers. The New Castle was formed during the numerous later modernizations of the castle; its purpose was to provide protection from enemy field armies and was designed to support newer military inventions such as long range artillery cannons.

=== The twelve towers ===
An important and large fortification complex, Kamianets-Podilskyi Castle had as many as 12 towers, some of which were added during later modernizations to the castle. Some of the towers were located on the peninsula on which the main castle sits; some of the other towers were located on the steep slopes across the Smotrych River. There also were other towers such as the Petty Southern Tower, a Dacia-Roman Tower, while another Dacia-Roman Tower stood just outside the eastern walls and a half tower is located at the western end of the Castle bridge. Of these towers, however, only a few remain unscathed today. Specifically, the 12 towers were the: (Note: Towers are listed in a clockwise order starting from the southwestern Pope's Tower.)

- Pope's Tower (also known as Karmeliuk's Tower, Julian Tower) was built sometime in the 15th and 16th centuries; an artillery arsenal, powder warehouse, treasury, and a mill were housed within the tower, interconnected with the extensive southern bastion;
- Kovpak Tower (also called the Szlachta Tower) (Note: Kovpak is a Ukrainian word for the Turkish Calpaq which is a high-crowned conical-form headgear (see Kalpak).) an earlier tower originating between the 14th and 16th centuries, where the town's szlachta nobility were quartered;
- Tenchynska Tower, from the 14th to 16th centuries, commemorated to the Tęczyński family;
- White Tower (also known as Laska Tower), constructed in the 15th century, which housed an additional artillery arsenal;
- Daily Tower (also called the Dzienna Tower), a large tower with a second-floor artillery intersection to move guns into firing position as well as onto the New Western Tower. It also housed a small Lutheran chapel and a smaller "orlyk" (eaglet), or observation tower, at the top;
- New Western Tower (or the Great Tower), built in 1544 and which served as a bastion. The tower contained one of the castle's printing presses, and also provided an artillery platform to cover the vast fields surrounding it. It was damaged in a severe storm in 2011.
- Różanka Tower (also known as the Burgrabska or Kreslavska Tower), which was constructed between the 14th and 16th centuries, housed a prison in the tower's basement. It is one of three towers (Tenchynska and Lanckorońska) that were finished with specially designed conical vault to draw away the gases from the gunpowder stored there;
- Water Tower (also known as the Smotrytska Tower), one of the castle's later constructions dating to the 15th to 18th centuries used to be connected to the castle by the Field Gate, located some distance away from the main compound on the northern side. It contained a well which drew water from the adjacent Smotrych River, and a secret tunnel, whose existence was only known to the local starosta and scribes;
- Commandant's Tower, built in the 15th century;
- Lanckorońska Tower (or the second Laska Tower), built between the 14th and 16th centuries, commemorated to the Lanckoroński family;
- Black Tower. Only the remains of this tower exist, dating back to the 15th and 16th centuries. It served as a magazine and was blown up in a protest (see earlier history section);
- New Eastern Tower, built in 1544.

=== Fortification walls ===
The walls of Kamianets-Podilskyi Castle are divided into three sections or terraces; the northern, southern, and eastern.

The walls of the northern terrace (about 336 metres or 1,102 feet in length) defend the whole inner courtyard. The courtyard's northwestern walls form the Old Castle, ending between the Day and Rozhanka Towers. They are made up of two parallel walls, which include the Petty Western Tower, the remnants of the Black Tower, and a two-level casemate, or fortified gun emplacement. The older of the two walls dates back to the beginning of the 12th century and is built with crenelations. Another casemate was located at the eastern walls. An entrance to the castle in the eastern walls is known as the New Castle Gate, and there were two more gates, one, in the northern walls, called the Old Castle Gate, and another, the Field Gate, connecting the Water Tower with the rest of the castle. The northern walls are reinforced with the Northern Bastion along their whole length. The bastion was built in 1790, just before the second partition of Poland. There is also the New Castle that was designed as a hornwork and located west from the main castle complex.

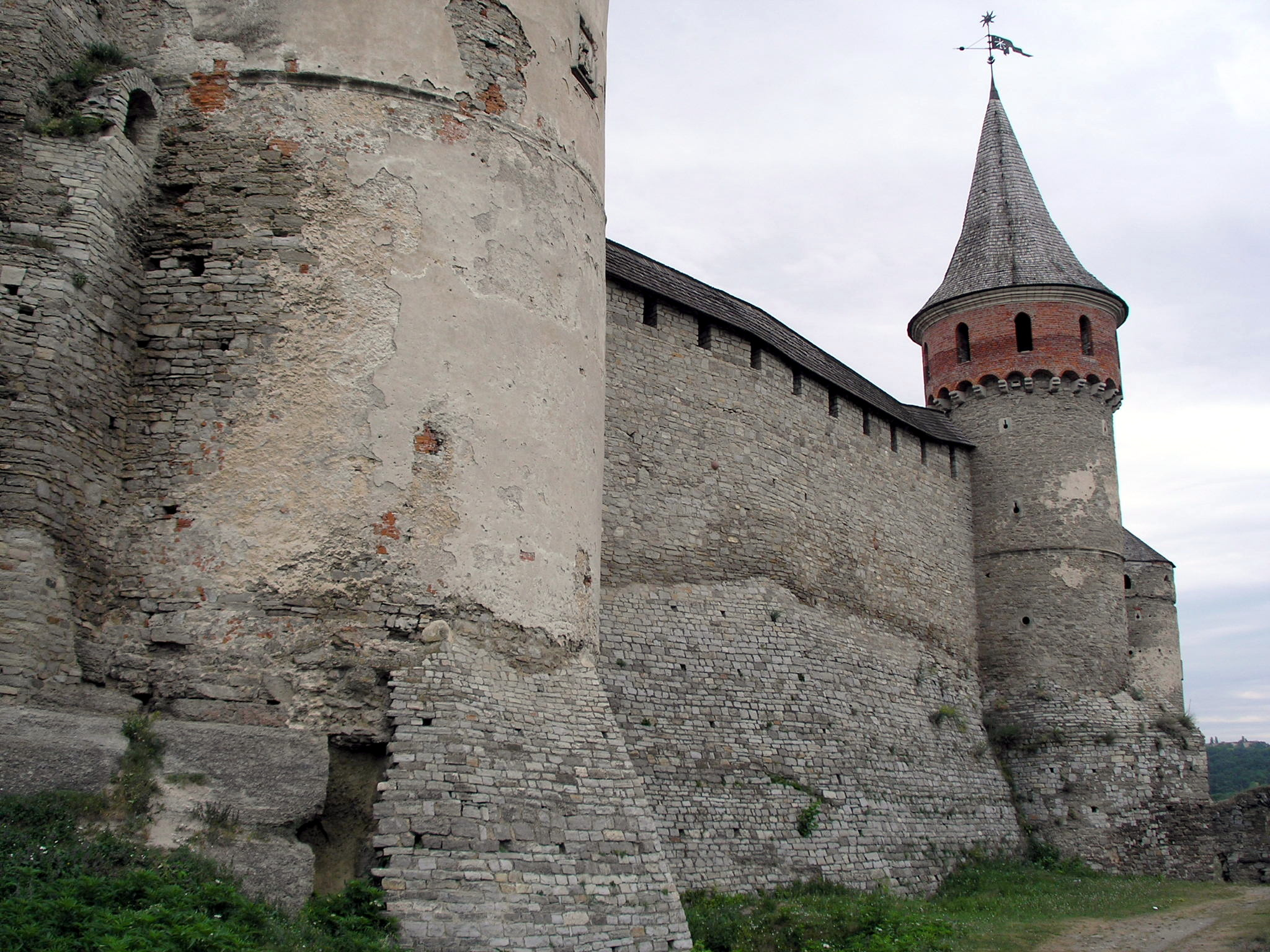
Centuries of additions to the fortification walls add to the castle's architectural diversity

At the eastern side of the castle's courtyard were the remnants of the St. Stanislaus Church, next to which was located a tomb of M. Potocki. Next to the Kovpak Tower stood an Eastern Orthodox church where Prince Koriatovych was buried. In the courtyard along the southern walls between Kovpak and Tenchynska Towers were a granary and cart shed. Across from these, near the northern walls and Lanckorońska Tower, was the residence of the starosta. Next to the Tenchynska Tower stood the "Rurmush" which served as a water storage tank for the castle. At the southern walls closer to the White Tower (between Tenchynska and White Towers) were a kitchen and a bakery. Adjacent to the White Tower at the southern walls between White and Day Towers stood the starosta's headquarters. Located against the western walls were the chelyadna, or serfs' quarters, which housed up to 70 serfs who served the castle. Located outside of the northern walls were the castle stables, which could house up to 30 horses. In the 16th century the castle had a garrison of around 300 soldiers, who lived in the town.

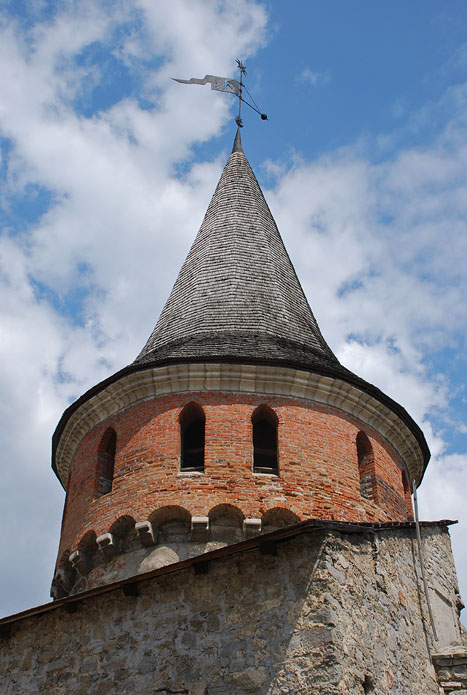
Closeup of one of the 12 towers

The Kamianets-Podilskyi Industrial Vocational School has investigated the castle walls. They discovered an area of quick sand at the roadside next to the "Podzamche", or sub-castle, neighborhood of the city, which in the previous year had partially undermined the castle's supporting walls. The effects of the quick sand had uncovered the fortress's foundation walls, a little over 5 m (16 ft) deep. The foundation walls were built on the limestone that creates a canyon along the river valley. Further excavation work showed that the walls stretched to the west, as well from the Old Castle to the bastions of the new one. The support footings for the old castle bridge were also found in the ditch. From the south in the wall there is a 2.5 m (8.2 ft) wide and 5 m (16 ft) tall opening, through which the Vocational School assumed water flowed.

The preserved northwestern walls are now 13.7 m (45 ft) high measured from the outside of the castle and 5.7 m (19 ft) high from the courtyard. As a result of the numerous reconstructions, the walls' depth changed throughout the centuries, being 1.45 m (4.8 ft) deep in the Medieval period, 2.2 m (7.2 ft) during the 14th and 15th centuries, and an average of 4 m (13 ft) after the reconstruction of the 16th and 17th centuries. Conservation works have recently been conducted on the walls to preserve the old Rus' fragments.

=== Castle bridge ===
As a result of the castle's unique location on a peninsula, the castle bridge (Ukrainian: Замковий міст) serves as the only transport link to the city's Old Town neighborhood. It is considered to represent a considerable feat of medieval engineering. The bridge has a length of 88 m (289 ft). At the entrance to the bridge, its width is around 8.5 m (28 ft), while at the end, it narrows to 6.5 m (21 ft). The bridge's height is 27 m (89 ft) at the entrance, dropping to 17 m (56 ft) on the far side.

At the beginning of the 15th century, a large round gate tower was constructed at the castle end of the bridge; the bridge's height, including the tower, was equivalent to that of eight modern stories. During the unsuccessful Polish siege of the city in 1687, the castle bridge was rebuilt and fortified by the Turks, acquiring the name "Turkish bridge" (Ukrainian: Турецький міст), which many locals still call it today. The bridge's stone façade was in poor repair from 1841 until the end of the 19th century. A subsequent lack of preservation work, together with earthquake damage in 1986, contributed to its poor condition. In 2000, the World Monuments Fund included Kamianets-Podilskyi Castle bridge in the 2000 World Monuments Watch.

== Legacy ==
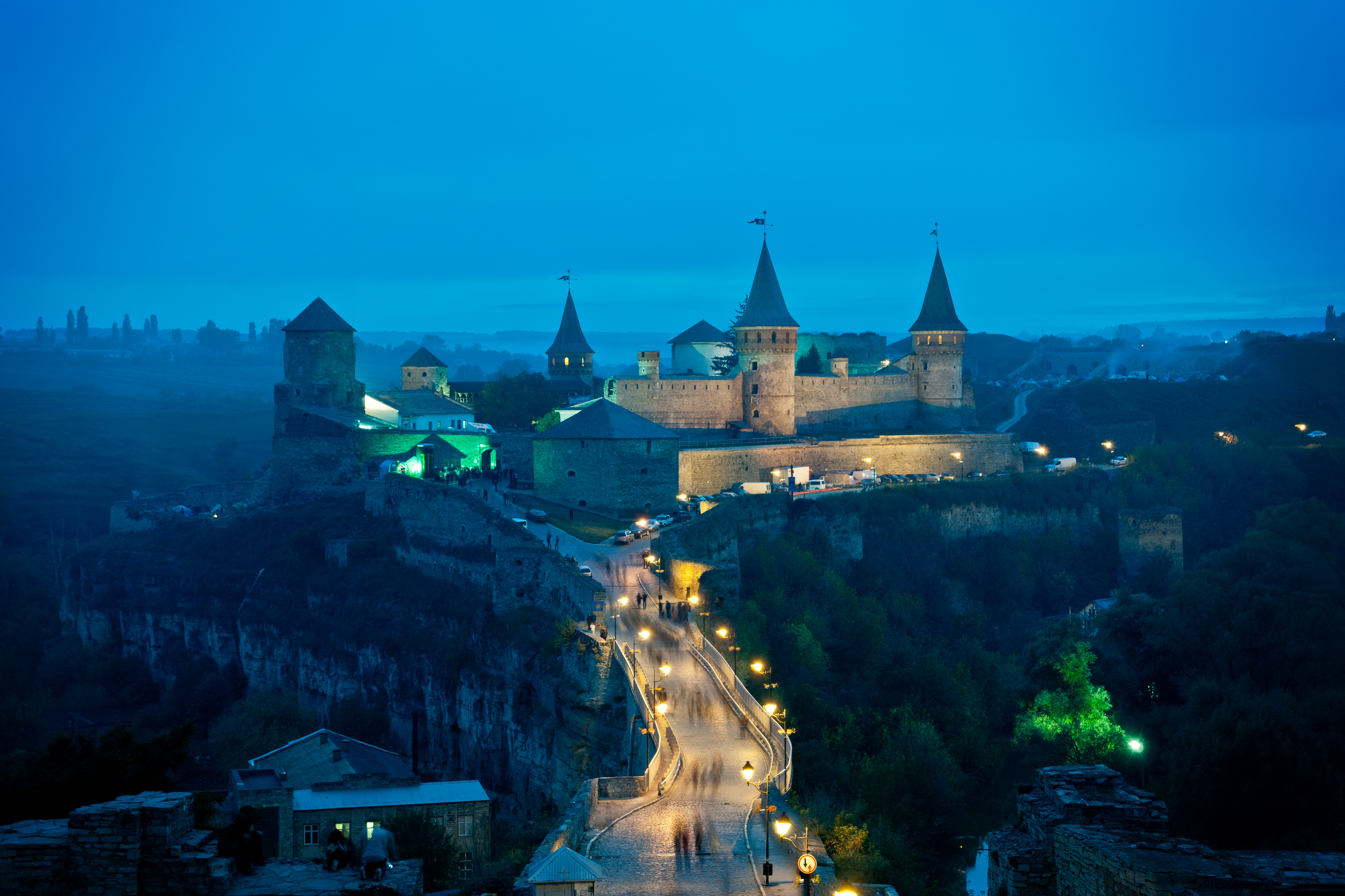
Night view of the Kamianets-Podilskyi Castle.

=== Legends ===
The castle features in several local legends. According to one legend, when Ottoman Sultan Osman II came to Kamianets in 1621 to capture the city, he was allegedly impressed by its strength and fortifications and asked "Who built this great city?" Someone then replied to him, "God himself." When Osman could not capture the castle, he then replied "Then let God himself take the city." Another local legend has it that Turkish gold is buried in the Smotrych River and that a 20 km (12 mi) tunnel leads to the Khotyn Fortress from Kamianets-Podilskyi Castle.

=== Literature ===
The events of the 1672 Ottoman siege were depicted in the 1888 historical novel Fire in the Steppe, written by Polish Nobel Prize laureate Henryk Sienkiewicz.

=== Coins ===
The castle has appeared on a commemorative coin of the "Ancient fortresses on the river Dniester" series issued by the Transnistrian Republican Bank of Transnistria, a breakaway, internationally unrecognised republic within Moldova. Similarly, the National Bank of Ukraine has released 5 and 10 hryvnias commemorative coins of the old castle in 2017.

=== Tourism ===
Kamianets-Podilskyi Castle was the most recognized attraction in the city in 2005. The castle sees a large number of tourists from across Ukraine and abroad, attracting thousands of tourists annually.

=== Festival ===
Beginning in 2011, the festival 'Respublica' has been held annually at the castle.

== See also ==
- List of castles in Ukraine
- List of historic reserves in Ukraine
- National Historical-Architectural Reserve "Kamianets" on the Ukrainian Wikipedia
