= Irina Rusanova =

Russian archaeologist

Irina Petrovna Rusanova (Russian: Ири́на Петро́вна Руса́нова, 22 April 1929 – 22 October 1998) was a Russian archaeologist who mostly explored early Slavic sites in the Western Ukraine. She held a string of positions at the Institute of Archaeology of the Soviet Academy of Sciences.

She studied at Moscow State University, first at the Department of Mechanics and Mathematics, then at the Department of Archaeology. Her diploma thesis was written under the supervision of Daniil Avdusin. Immediately afterward, she entered postgraduate studies and became a student of Pyotr Tretyakov. Her Candidate of Sciences dissertation examined the Drevlian archaeological sites (1960).

Beginning in 1959, Rusanova conducted independent research in Polissia, especially the Zhytomyr region. In 1974, after marrying archaeologist Boris Timoshchuk, they jointly led an expedition to study two 5th-century Slavic settlements on the Prut River (known as Kodyn).

Rusanova's Doctor of Sciences dissertation (1977) was dedicated to the Prague-Korchak culture. She championed the idea that the Prague culture (the first unambiguously Slavic culture) had grown out of the earlier Zarubintsy culture. This idea was taken up and developed by some of her students such as Andrey Oblomsky.

In 1984, Rusanova and Timoshchuk conducted an archaeological expedition in the Zbruch River basin, exploring the site of the discovery of the famous Zbruch idol, among other sites. They concluded that the "Zbruch pagan cult center", featuring human sacrifices, had been still active in the 12th and 13th centuries (that is, well after the Baptism of Rus). Those conclusions sparked a controversy.

== Publications ==
- Kurgany polân X-XII vv, 1966
- Slavjanskie drevnosti VI - IX vv. meždu Dneprom i zapadnym Bugom, 1966
- Drevnerusskoe Podnestrovʹe : Istoriko-kraevedcheskie ocherki, 1981
- Kodyn - slavânskie poseleniâ V-VIII vv. na r. Prut, 1984
- Kulʹtura i iskusstvo srednevekovogo goroda, 1984
- Âzyčeskie svâtiliŝa drevnih slavân : rossijskaâ predistoriâ, 1993
- Slavâne i ih sosedi v konce I tysâčeletiâ do n.è.-pervoj polovine I tysâčeletiâ n.è., 1993
- Jazyceskie svjatilisca drevnich slavjan, 1993
- Istoki slavjanskogo jazyčestva : kul'tovye sooruženija Central'noj i Vostočnoj Evropy v I tys. do n.ė. - I tys. n.ė, 2002
- I︠A︡zycheskie svi︠a︡tilishcha drevnikh slavi︠a︡n, 2007
