= Cherkasy Castle =

Former castle in Cherkasy, Ukraine

- Черкаський замок
- Ukraine

Site information
- Condition: No trace

Location
- Cherkasy Castle Cherkasy Castle (Ukraine)
- Coordinates: 49°26′51″N 32°03′54″E

Site history
- Built: 1392
- Materials: Oak and pine logs, filled with earth.
- Fate: demolished 20 June 1768

Garrison information
- Occupants: Cossacks

The Cherkasy Castle (Ukrainian: Черкаський замок, romanized: Cherkas'kyi zamok) is a former medieval wooden castle in Cherkasy, Ukraine built as a defense against enemies of the Golden Horde and later against Turks and Crimean Tatars.

The city of Cherkasy grew up around the castle. The wooden castle was rebuilt in 1549. Today traces of the castle no longer exist.

== The structure of the castle ==
The dimensions of the first castle were 60 meters (200 ft) by 40 meters (130 ft) along the Dnieper strip. The walls were built of oak and pine logs, placed vertically and very tightly filled with earth. At the corners of 4 pine towers were large-caliber guns, made in Cherkasy in 1532.

The castle was located within the modern square of Bohdan Khmelnytsky, on Castle Hill. At that time, Kyiv region was under the rule of Lithuania, and Cherkasy was owned by Skirgaila. The walls of which stretched along the hem of the modern Rose Valley.

The castle had barns, stables, barns, a house for the elderly, rooms for guests, a house for the castle staff, two pubs, a prison and a church. It was surrounded by a wide moat. The city of Cherkasy itself was built on both sides of the castle which had a fortification and a prison with two gates.

== Site today ==
The square is equipped with footpaths, lighting and park benches. At the entrance to the park there is a stele with the image of Bohdan Khmelnytsky in honor of the 325th anniversary of the reunification of Ukraine with Russia. In the center is a monument to a prominent Cossack ataman, and short-lived Voivode (Prince) of Moldavia, Ioan Potcoavă.

== See also ==
List of castles in Ukraine
