= Novosilka, Zalishchyky urban hromada, Chortkiv Raion, Ternopil Oblast =

Rural locality in Ternopil Oblast, Ukraine

Novosilka Новосілка
- Location in Ternopil Oblast
- Coordinates: 48°42′45″N 25°55′13″E
- Country: Ukraine
- Oblast: Ternopil Oblast
- Raion: Chortkiv Raion
- Hromada: Zalishchyky urban hromada
- Time zone: UTC+2 (EET)
  - Summer (DST): UTC+3 (EEST)
- Postal code: 48654

Novosilka (Ukrainian: Новосілка) is a village in Zalishchyky urban hromada, Chortkiv Raion, Ternopil Oblast, Ukraine.

== History ==
It was first mentioned in writings in 1530.

After the liquidation of the Zalishchyky Raion on 19 July 2020, the village became part of the Chortkiv Raion.

== Religion ==
- St. Michael's church (1900, brick),
- remains of a Roman Catholic church (1863),
- St. Magdalena chapel (19th century).

== Monuments ==
- Remains of the castle tower (17th century).

== Sources ==
- (in Ukrainian) Олійник В., Романишин М., Новосілка // Ternopil Encyclopedic Dictionary: in 4 v. / editorial board: H. Yavorskyi and other, Ternopil: "Zbruch", 2005, V. 2: К—О, S. 641–642. — ISBN 966-528-199-2.
- "Nowosiółka Kostiukowa (6)". Geographical Dictionary of the Kingdom of Poland (in Polish). 7. Warszawa: Kasa im. Józefa Mianowskiego. 1886. p. 277.
