= Tymon Zaborowski =

Polish poet

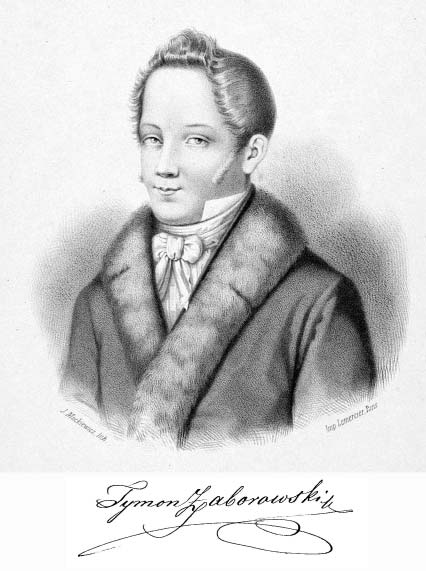
- Born: 18 April 1799; Lychkivtsi
- Died: March 1828 (aged 28)

Tymon Zaborowski (1799–1828) was a Polish poet. He was influenced at the beginning of his writing career by classicism, then by Romanticism. He is also known, after one of his poems, as Wieszcz Miodoboru ("the Bard of the Honey Harvest").

== Life ==
Tymon Zaborowski was born on 18 April 1799 in Lychkivtsi, Podolia. In 1810–16 he attended the Liceum Krzemienieckie. He began writing in 1814 as a member of a student Klub Piśmienniczy (Writing Club).

In 1816–18, in Warsaw, Zaborowski was editor of the literary section of a magazine, Ćwiczenia Naukowe (Scholarly Exercises). Then he settled at the family estate in Liczkowce.

He died in 1828 in Liczkowce. It is unknown whether his death date is 20 or 28 March.

== Works ==
- Tajemnica, czyli Borys i Malwina (1822–24)
- Dumy podolskie za czasów panowania tureckiego w tej ziemi (1830)
- Klub piśmienniczy, a mock-heroic poem

Unfinished poems:

- Zdobycie Kijowa (ca. 1818)
- Bojan (1822), published in Ateneum in 1883

Never-published dramas:

- Bohdan Chmielnicki
- Umwit

Many of his works were published for the first time in Pisma zebrane (Collected Works), 3 volumes, 1936.

== See also ==
- List of Poles
