= Novosilka Castle =

Castle in Novosilka, Ternopil Oblast, Ukraine

- Новосілківський замок
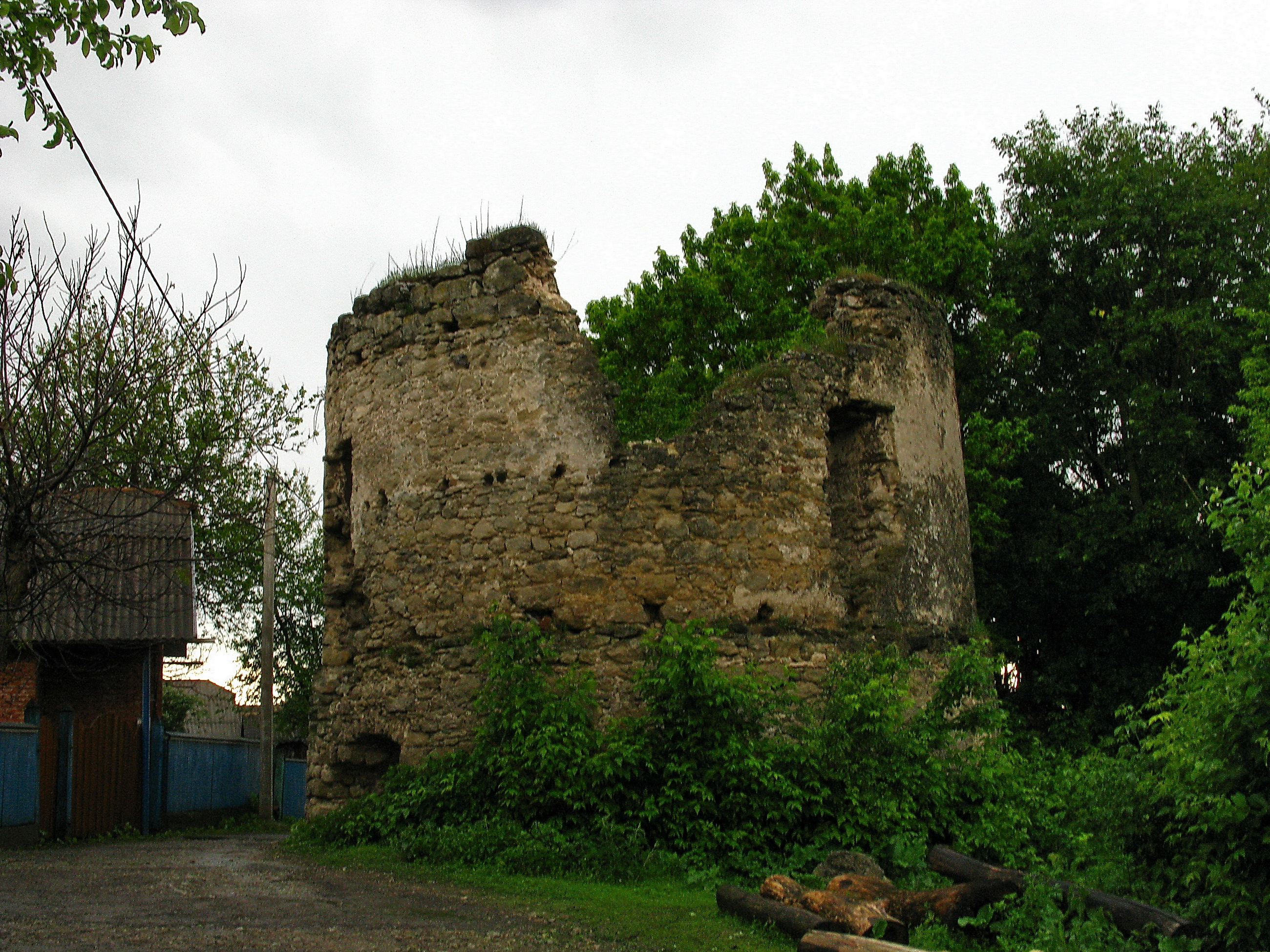
- Interactive map of the Novosilka Castle area

General information
- Status: Architectural monument of local importance
- Location: Novosilka, Chortkiv Raion, Ternopil Oblast, Ukraine
- Coordinates: 48°42′45″N 25°55′13″E

The Novosilka Castle (Ukrainian: Новосілківський замок, romanized: Novosilkivs'kyi zamok) is a castle located in Novosilka, Ternopil Oblast, Ukraine. The castle was built by the knightly Kostjuków-Wołodyjowski family, to which the village Novosilka had belonged from 1547, and an architectural monument of local importance.

== History ==
In 1672 the castle was destroyed during a Turkish invasion and was not later rebuilt. Its ruins survived until the mid-19th century, when they were demolished and the material was used to build a church, houses, and to pave the road.

== Architecture ==
It was a stone building surrounded by a wall and had four towers. To this day, what remains of it is a round, several-story tower known as Wołodyjowski's Tower from the 17th century and small, overgrown fragments of earthen fortifications.

== Bibliography ==
- Filip Sulimierski, Bronisław Chlebowski, Władysław Walewski, Słownik geograficzny Królestwa Polskiego i innych krajów słowiańskich, t. VII, Warszawa, 1880–1902, s. 277.
