= Yaniv Castle =

Castle in Dolyna, Ternopil Oblast, Ukraine

- Янівський замок
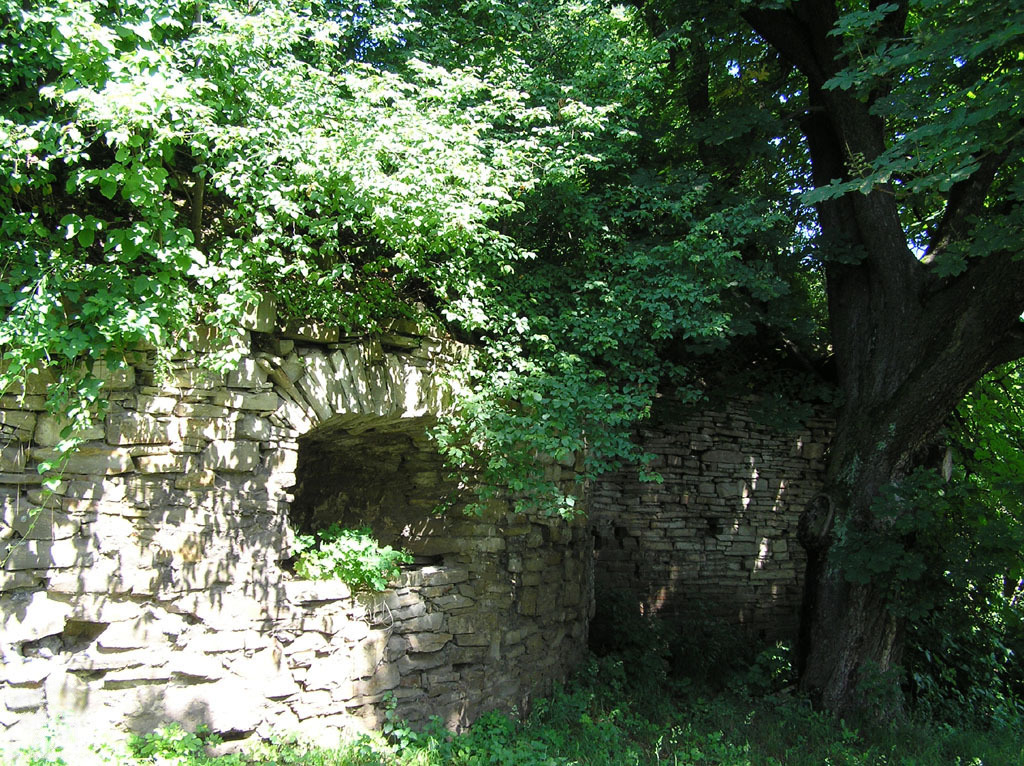
- Ruins of the castle

General information
- Location: Dolyna, Ternopil Raion, Ternopil Oblast, Ukraine
- Coordinates: 49°12′43″N 25°43′29″E

Immovable Monument of National Significance of Ukraine
- Official name: Замок (мур.) (Castle (stone))
- Type: Architecture
- Reference no.: 190048

The Yaniv Castle (Ukrainian: Янівський замок, romanized: Yanivs'kyi zamok) is located in Dolyna, Ternopil Oblast, Ukraine. The stronghold was built in the 17th century on a sloping hill by Jan Golski, Voivode of Podolia and Castellan of Halych, brother of Stanisław Golski, Voivode of Rus, and an architectural monument of national significance.

== History ==
In 1675, the castle was captured and destroyed by the Turks. Later it was not rebuilt. Subsequently, the stronghold was in the possession of the Bogusz family, which built a saltpeter factory at the foot of the castle.

== Architecture ==
The defensive castle was built on a rectangular plan, on the north side of the peninsula, the only one that led to the village. It was a stone structure having: a dwelling, a chapel, and round and square towers, surrounded by a wall, which, damaged in several places later, also protected the church. The castle's corners were fortified with towers, of which two are best preserved: a quadrilateral and cylindrical one on the north side, converted into the parish priest's cellar. Its preserved remains by the thickness of the walls testify to the castle's former fortress. The Roman Catholic Church standing among the ruins is probably a converted castle chapel.

== Bibliography ==
- Filip Sulimierski, Bronisław Chlebowski, Władysław Walewski, Słownik geograficzny Królestwa Polskiego i innych krajów słowiańskich, t. III, Warszawa, 1880–1902, ss. 425–26.
