= Kryvche =

Village in Ternopil Oblast, Ukraine

Kryvche Кривче
- Village
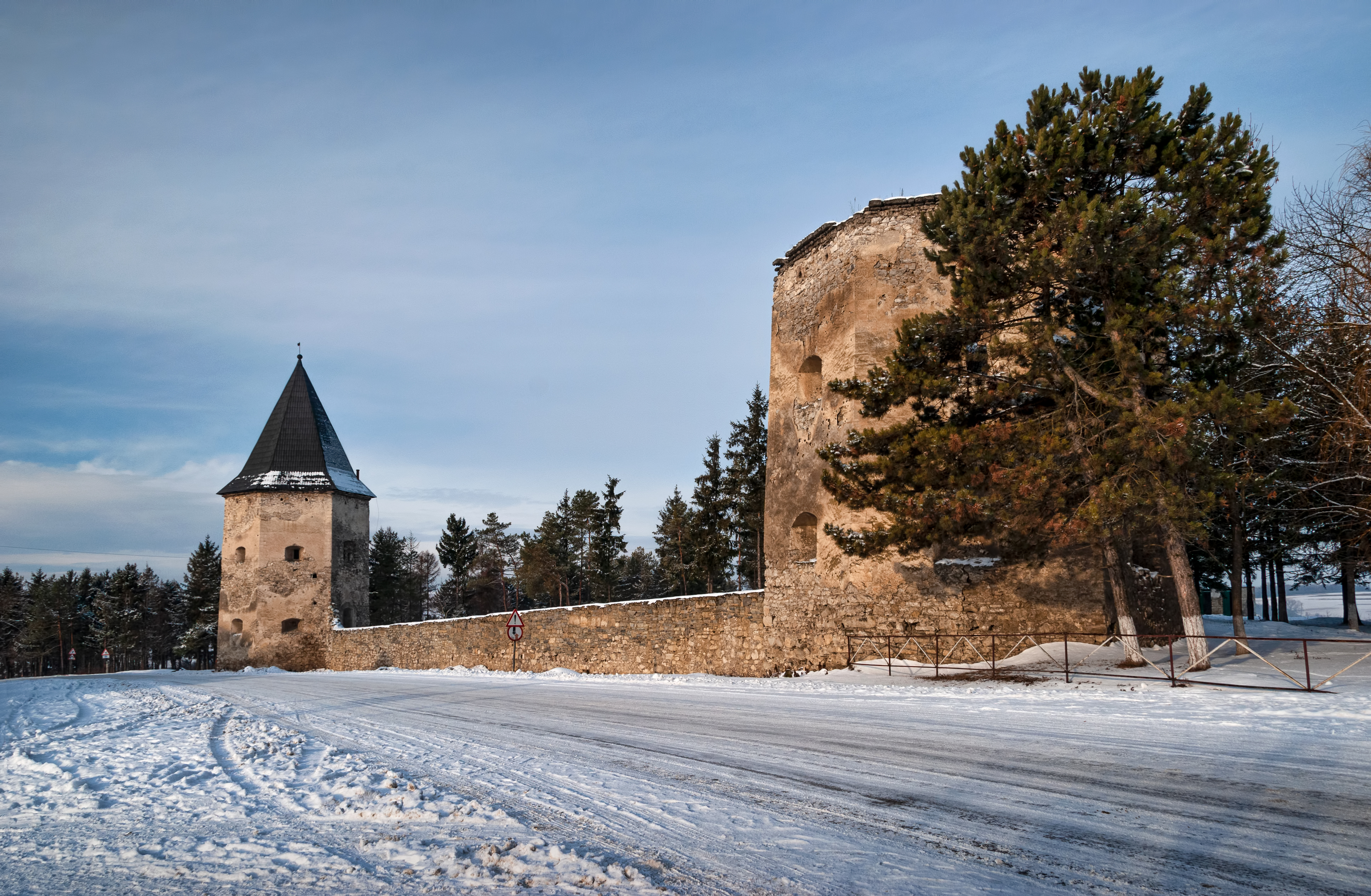
- Castle in Kryvche

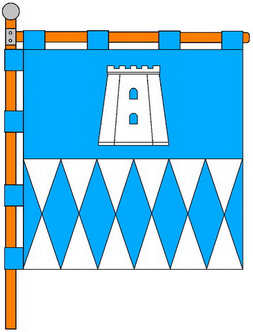
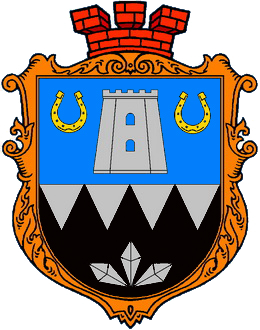
- Flag Coat of arms

- Location in Ukraine Kryvche (Ukraine)
- Coordinates: 48°41′55″N 26°06′20″E
- Country: Ukraine
- Oblast: Ternopil Oblast
- District: Chortkiv Raion

Population
  - Total: 1,865
- Time zone: UTC+2 (EET)
  - Summer (DST): UTC+3 (EEST)
- Postal code: 48741

Kryvche (Ukrainian: Кривче, Polish: Krzywcze), a village in Ukraine, is located within Chortkiv Raion of Ternopil Oblast. It belongs to Borshchiv urban hromada, one of the hromadas of Ukraine.

== Sources ==
- (in Ukrainian) Ternopil Encyclopedic Dictionary: in 4 v. / editorial board: H. Yavorskyi and other, Ternopil: "Zbruch", 2004–2010. — ISBN 966-528-197-6.
