= Dolyna, Ternopil Raion, Ternopil Oblast =

Rural locality in Ternopil Oblast, Ukraine

Dolyna Долина
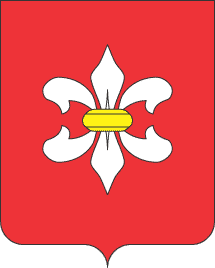
- Coat of arms

- Location in Ternopil Oblast Dolyna (Ukraine)
- Coordinates: 49°12′36″N 25°43′29″E
- Country: Ukraine
- Oblast: Ternopil Oblast
- Raion: Ternopil Raion
- Hromada: Terebovlia urban hromada
- Time zone: UTC+2 (EET)
  - Summer (DST): UTC+3 (EEST)
- Postal code: 48163

Dolyna (Ukrainian: Долина; until 1960, Yaniv) is a village in Terebovlia urban hromada, Ternopil Raion, Ternopil Oblast, Ukraine.

== History ==
The first written mention of the village was in 1497.

After the liquidation of the Terebovlia Raion on 19 July 2020, the village became part of the Ternopil Raion.

== Religion ==
- St. Michael church (1724, brick, UGCC),
- Holy Trinity church (1661, converted from a Roman Catholic church in 1989, OCU).

== Monuments ==
- Yaniv Castle

== Sources ==
- (in Ukrainian) Михайлюк М., Уніят В., Долина // Ternopil Encyclopedic Dictionary: in 4 v. / editorial board: H. Yavorskyi and other, Ternopil: "Zbruch", 2004, V. 1: А—Й, S. 517. — ISBN 966-528-197-6.
- "Janów (3), pow. Trembowelski". Geographical Dictionary of the Kingdom of Poland (in Polish). 3. Warszawa: Kasa im. Józefa Mianowskiego. 1882. p. 425.
