= Kryvche Castle =

Castle in Kryvche, Ternopil Oblast, Ukraine

- Кривченський замок
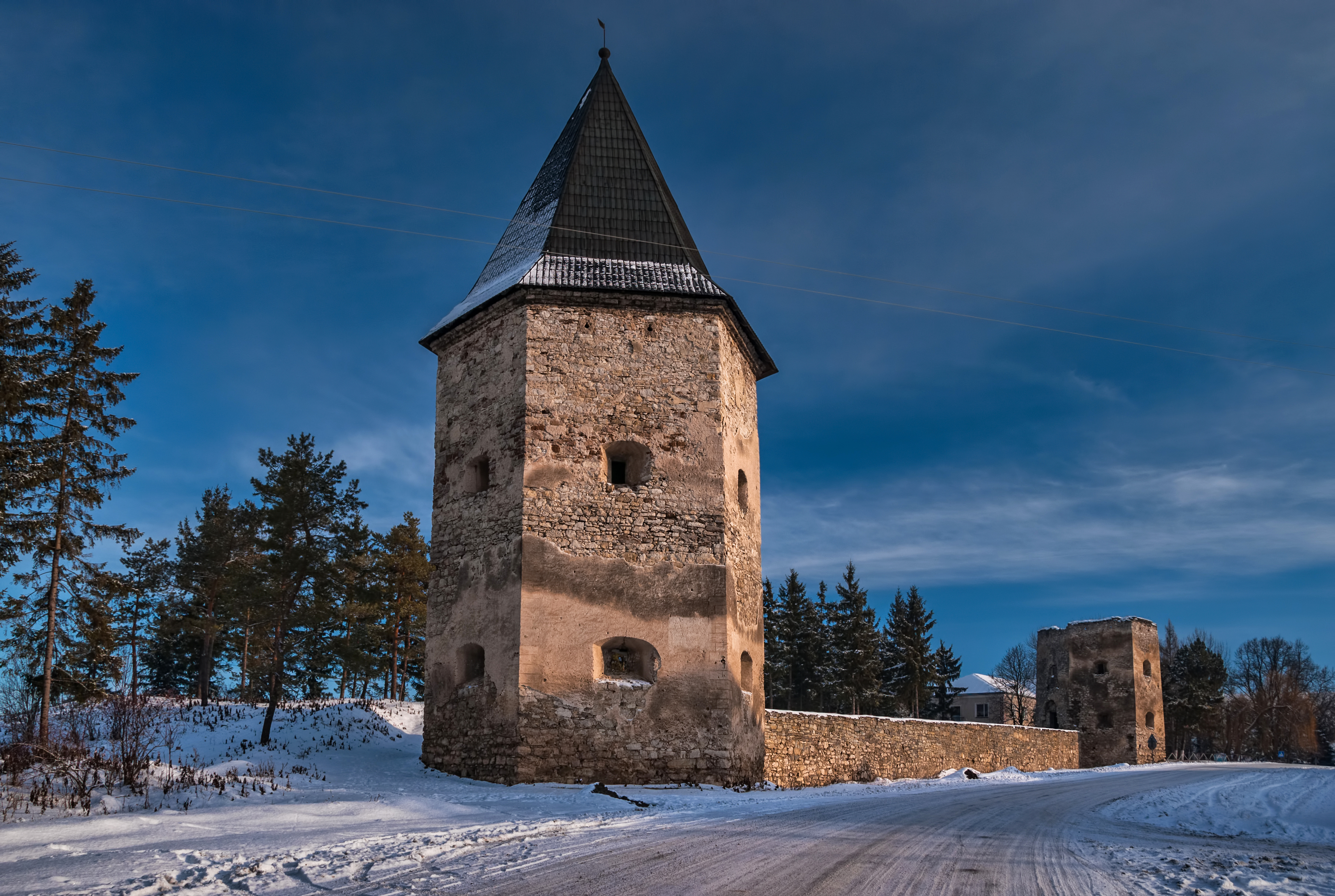
- Remains of the fortress

General information
- Status: Architectural monument of national importance
- Location: Kryvche, Chortkiv Raion, Ternopil Oblast, Ukraine
- Coordinates: 48°41′59″N 26°06′00″E

Immovable Monument of National Significance of Ukraine
- Official name: Замок (Castle)
- Type: Architecture
- Reference no.: 190021

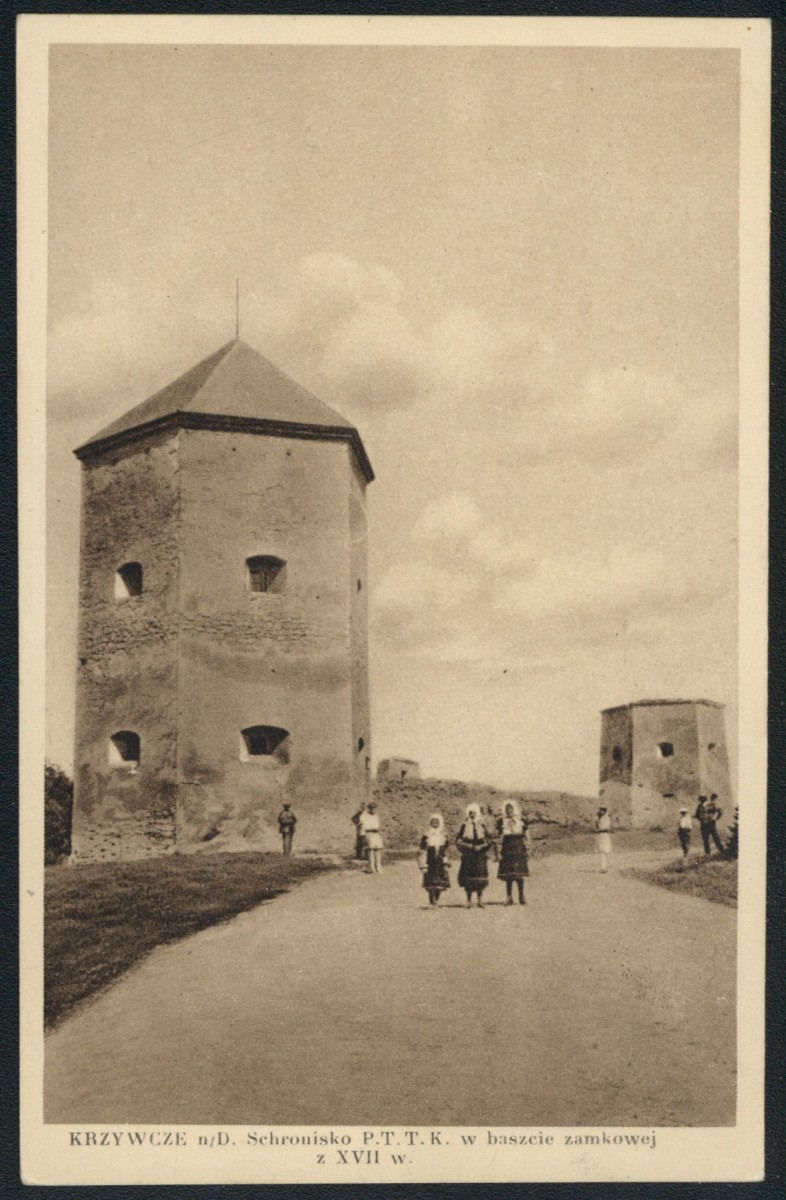
The castle in the early 20th century.

The Kryvche Castle (Ukrainian: Кривченський замок, romanized: Kryvchen'skyi zamok) is located in Kryvche, Ternopil Oblast, Ukraine. It was built in the first half of the 17th century by the Kątski family, and an architectural monument of national importance.

== Location ==
The castle is located in the center of the village of Kryvche in Podolia, on the top of a hill dominating the area, between two valleys through which the tributaries of the Tsyhanka River flow.

== History ==
A private castle of the Kącki family built in 1639. During the uprising of 1648, the castle was captured by the troops of Bohdan Khmelnytskyi. In 1672 it was captured by the Turks (Sultan Mehmed IV spent the night under it). Then in 1675 it was recaptured by John III Sobieski. In 1684–1699 the castle served as a base for the Polish Crown troops taking part in the war with Turkey and a stronghold blocking Kamianets-Podilskyi, which lay 40 km away occupied by the Turks. At that time, in 1687, one of the Polish flags repulsed a Turkish attack in the castle.

The castle was inhabited until the mid-19th century by the Golejewski family, who owned the local estate. After 1848, the castle passed into the hands of the Jewish Seidmann family, who demolished it in the second half of the 19th century for building material. The remaining two towers were protected from demolition thanks to the intervention of heritage enthusiasts. Partial reconstruction began during the Second Polish Republic, when a tourist hostel of the Podolia Tourist Society was placed in one of the towers. Subsequent demolitions were carried out after 1946. In 1990, the wall connecting the two surviving towers was rebuilt.

Only two towers with loopholes and a fragment of the walls have survived to date.

== Architecture ==
The castle was built on a regular plan of an elongated quadrilateral – a rectangle with four three-story towers at the corners. The sides were 78 by 53 meters long. There was an entrance gate in the eastern curtain of the walls, demolished in 1946 to obtain building materials in connection with the construction of a road.
