= Chernelytsia Castle =

Castle in Chernelytsia, Ukraine

Coordinates: 48°48′44″N 25°25′52″E

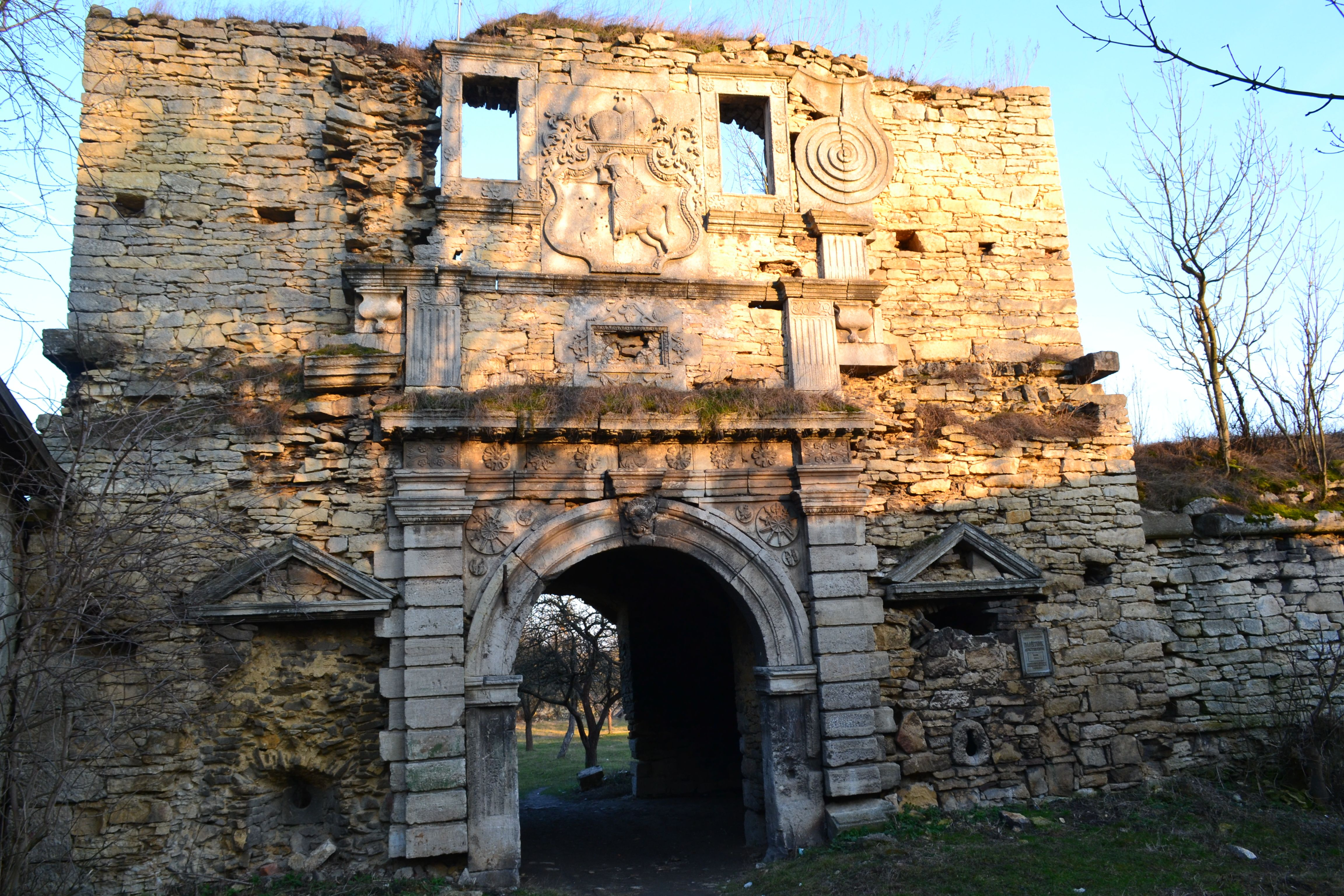
- Chernelytsia Castle in 2014

Immovable Monument of National Significance of Ukraine
- Official name: Замок (Castle)
- Type: Architecture
- Reference no.: 090066

The Chernelytsia Castle (Ukrainian: Чернелицький замок; Polish: Zamek w Czernelicy) is a castle built in Chernelytsia in Pokuttia, then part of the Kingdom of Poland, in 1659 by Bratslav Voivode Michał Jerzy Czartoryski.

== Architecture ==
Built in a bastion fort style, the castle occupies an area of around 2 hectares, and is protected by defensive walls that are up to 6 meters high and 2.5 meters thick and loopholes for firearms. There are four acute-angled bastions at the corners of the castle. The front façade is decorated with «Pogoń», the coat of arms of the Grand Duchy of Lithuania. The western façade of the gates is decorated with Piława, Polish coat of arms, located above the stone doors of the gates, followed by the letters E.S.X.C.W.B., meaning "Euphrosyne Stanislavitskaya, princess of Czartorysk, Bratslav governor (wojewoda)" (the second wife of Mikhail Czartoryskiy).

== History ==
The castle was built in two phases. The construction of the lower parts of the walls was initiated between 1622 and 1636 by Jadwiga Bełżecka, daughter of the Grand Crown Hetman Jerzy Jazłowiecki and widow of Captain Andrzej Bełżecki. This section of the castle was modeled after the castle in Jazłowiec. The upper parts of the castle, including the gate tower, were built during the second phase in a different style. The entire structure was completed in 1659 by Michał Jerzy Czartoryski, the Voivode of Volhynia and Bratslav, who acquired the castle through his marriage to Eufrozyna née Stanisławska.

In 1672 and 1676, the castle suffered damage during the war with the Turks (also Tatars, Vlachs). The castle played an important role during the Polish–Ottoman War in 1685-1690. It was the largest eastern castle of the Polish–Lithuanian Commonwealth on the right bank of the Dniester River. During the times of the Moldavian crusades of Jan III Sobieski the castle was the storage place of provisions and fodder. Several times the King himself stopped there.

At the turn of the 18th and 19th centuries, the castle was owned by Tsensky.

In 1892, then owner of the castle Samuel Mosberg wanted to rebuild the castle. But the order of Gorodenka Starostats prohibited any construction under the threat of punishment. The castle stopped functioning after the Soviet annexation of Eastern Galicia and Volhynia in 1939.
