= Lychkivtsi =

Village in Ternopil Oblast, Ukraine

Lychkivtsi Личківці
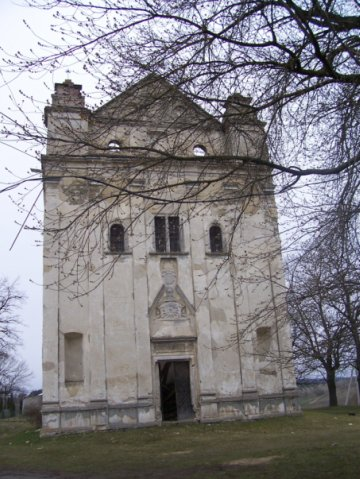

- Location in Ternopil Oblast
- Coordinates: 49°8′46″N 26°9′36″E
- Country: Ukraine
- Oblast: Ternopil Oblast
- Raion: Chortkiv Raion
- Hromada: Husiatyn Hromada
- Postal code: 48253

Lychkivtsi (Ukrainian: Личківці) is a village in Husiatyn settlement hromada, Chortkiv Raion, Ternopil Oblast, Ukraine.

== History ==
The first written mention is from 1427.

In 1848, the Zbruch Idol was found on the right bank of the Zbruch, near Lychkivtsi.

Also, there are ruins of the castle (17th century).

== Religion ==
- Saint Nicholas Church (1850, built of brick)
- Church of the Immaculate Conception of the Virgin Mary (1706, restored in 1728)

== Notable residents ==
- Tymon Zaborowski (1799–1828), Polish poet
