= Peschanoye =

Peschanoye (Russian: Песчаное; neuter), Peschany (Песчаный; masculine) or Peschanaya (Песчаная; feminine) is a toponym:

== Modern localities ==
=== Altai Krai ===
As of 2012, three rural localities in Altai Krai bear this name:

- Peschany, Altai Krai, a settlement in Kuybyshevsky Selsoviet of Rubtsovsky District; 51°38′N 81°5′E
- Peschanoye, Smolensky District, Altai Krai (or Peschanaya), a selo in Linevsky Selsoviet of Smolensky District; 52°24′N 84°53′E
- Peschanoye, Topchikhinsky District, Altai Krai (or Peschanaya), a selo in Parfenovsky Selsoviet of Topchikhinsky District; 52°47′N 82°31′E

=== Astrakhan Oblast ===
As of 2012, one rural locality in Astrakhan Oblast bears this name:

- Peschanoye, Astrakhan Oblast, a selo under the administrative jurisdiction of Liman Urban-Type Settlement in Limansky District; 45°48′N 47°19′E

=== Republic of Bashkortostan ===
As of 2012, one rural locality in the Republic of Bashkortostan bears this name:

- Peschany, Republic of Bashkortostan, a village in Bulgakovsky Selsoviet of Ufimsky District; 54°32′N 55°52′E

=== Belgorod Oblast ===
As of 2012, two rural localities in Belgorod Oblast bear this name:

- Peschanoye, Ivnyansky District, Belgorod Oblast, a selo in Ivnyansky District
- Peschanoye, Korochansky District, Belgorod Oblast, a khutor in Korochansky District

=== Bryansk Oblast ===
As of 2012, one rural locality in Bryansk Oblast bears this name:

- Peschany, Bryansk Oblast, a settlement in Klyukovensky Rural Administrative Okrug of Navlinsky District; 52°55′N 34°26′E

=== Chechen Republic ===
As of 2012, one rural locality in the Chechen Republic bears this name:

- Peschanoye, Chechen Republic, a settlement in Burunskaya Rural Administration of Shelkovskoy District

=== Chelyabinsk Oblast ===
As of 2012, three rural localities in Chelyabinsk Oblast bear this name:

- Peschany, Chelyabinsk Oblast, a settlement in Lugovskoy Selsoviet of Krasnoarmeysky District
- Peschanoye, Troitsky District, Chelyabinsk Oblast, a selo in Peschansky Selsoviet of Troitsky District
- Peschanoye, Uvelsky District, Chelyabinsk Oblast, a selo in Khutorsky Selsoviet of Uvelsky District

=== Republic of Crimea ===
As of 2012, one rural locality in Republic of Crimea bears this name:

- Peschanoye, Republic of Crimea, a selo in Bakhchisaraysky District

=== Irkutsk Oblast ===
As of 2012, one rural locality in Irkutsk Oblast bears this name:

- Peschanaya, Irkutsk Oblast, a settlement in Olkhonsky District

=== Jewish Autonomous Oblast ===
As of 2012, one rural locality in the Jewish Autonomous Oblast bears this name:

- Peschanoye, Jewish Autonomous Oblast, a selo in Smidovichsky District

=== Kaliningrad Oblast ===
As of 2012, one rural locality in Kaliningrad Oblast bears this name:

- Peschanoye, Kaliningrad Oblast, a settlement under the administrative jurisdiction of the town of oblast significance of Svetly

=== Republic of Kalmykia ===
As of 2012, one rural locality in the Republic of Kalmykia bears this name:

- Peschany, Republic of Kalmykia, a settlement in Peschanaya Rural Administration of Priyutnensky District; 46°15′N 44°10′E

=== Republic of Karelia ===
As of 2012, one rural locality in the Republic of Karelia bears this name:

- Peschanoye, Republic of Karelia, a village in Pudozhsky District

=== Khanty-Mansi Autonomous Okrug ===
As of 2012, one rural locality in Khanty-Mansi Autonomous Okrug bears this name:

- Peschany, Khanty-Mansi Autonomous Okrug, a settlement in Surgutsky District

=== Krasnodar Krai ===
As of 2012, four rural localities in Krasnodar Krai bear this name:

- Peschany, Anapsky District, Krasnodar Krai, a khutor in Primorsky Rural Okrug of Anapsky District; 45°2′N 37°18′E
- Peschany, Korenovsky District, Krasnodar Krai, a settlement in Novoberezansky Rural Okrug of Korenovsky District; 45°45′N 39°31′E
- Peschany, Seversky District, Krasnodar Krai, a khutor in Lvovsky Rural Okrug of Seversky District; 44°57′N 38°38′E
- Peschany, Tbilissky District, Krasnodar Krai, a khutor in Peschany Rural Okrug of Tbilissky District; 45°15′N 40°23′E

=== Kursk Oblast ===
As of 2012, one rural locality in Kursk Oblast bears this name:

- Peschanoye, Kursk Oblast, a selo in Peschansky Selsoviet of Belovsky District

=== Mari El Republic ===
As of 2012, one rural locality in the Mari El Republic bears this name:

- Peschany, Mari El Republic, a settlement in Kuyarsky Rural Okrug of Medvedevsky District; 56°29′N 48°3′E

=== Murmansk Oblast ===
As of 2012, one rural locality in Murmansk Oblast bears this name:

- Peschany, Murmansk Oblast, an inhabited locality in Pushnovsky Territorial Okrug of Kolsky District; 68°30′N 33°14′E

=== Novgorod Oblast ===
As of 2012, one rural locality in Novgorod Oblast bears this name:

- Peschanoye, Novgorod Oblast, a village in Rakomskoye Settlement of Novgorodsky District

=== Orenburg Oblast ===
As of 2012, one rural locality in Orenburg Oblast bears this name:

- Peschanoye, Orenburg Oblast, a selo in Privolny Selsoviet of Ileksky District

=== Oryol Oblast ===
As of 2012, one rural locality in Oryol Oblast bears this name:

- Peschany, Oryol Oblast, a settlement in Krasnoarmeysky Selsoviet of Sverdlovsky District; 52°31′N 36°28′E

=== Primorsky Krai ===
As of 2012, one rural locality in Primorsky Krai bears this name:

- Peschanoye, Primorsky Krai, a selo in Mikhaylovsky District

=== Rostov Oblast ===
As of 2012, one rural locality in Rostov Oblast bears this name:

- Peschany, Rostov Oblast, a khutor in Zadonskoye Rural Settlement of Azovsky District; 46°57′N 39°36′E

=== Saratov Oblast ===
As of 2012, two rural localities in Saratov Oblast bear this name:

- Peschany, Saratov Oblast, a settlement in Kalininsky District
- Peschanoye, Saratov Oblast, a selo in Rovensky District

=== Stavropol Krai ===
As of 2012, one rural locality in Stavropol Krai bears this name:

- Peschany, Stavropol Krai, a settlement in Roshchinsky Selsoviet of Kursky District

=== Tambov Oblast ===
As of 2012, one rural locality in Tambov Oblast bears this name:

- Peschanoye, Tambov Oblast, a selo in Rakhmaninsky Selsoviet of Petrovsky District

=== Tyumen Oblast ===
As of 2012, one rural locality in Tyumen Oblast bears this name:

- Peschanoye, Tyumen Oblast, a village in Ognevsky Rural Okrug of Kazansky District

=== Volgograd Oblast ===
As of 2012, two rural localities in Volgograd Oblast bear this name:

- Peschany, Bykovsky District, Volgograd Oblast, a settlement in Kislovsky Selsoviet of Bykovsky District
- Peschany, Serafimovichsky District, Volgograd Oblast, a khutor in Peschanovsky Selsoviet of Serafimovichsky District

=== Voronezh Oblast ===
As of 2012, two rural localities in Voronezh Oblast bear this name:

- Peschany, Olkhovatsky District, Voronezh Oblast, a khutor in Shaposhnikovskoye Rural Settlement of Olkhovatsky District
- Peschany, Podgorensky District, Voronezh Oblast, a khutor in Skororybskoye Rural Settlement of Podgorensky District

== Alternative names ==
- Peschany, alternative name of Altn Bulg, a settlement in Sarpinskaya Rural Administration of Ketchenerovsky District in the Republic of Kalmykia; 47°0′N 45°36′E
- Peschanoye, alternative name of Yashkul, a settlement in Yashkulskaya Rural Administration of Yashkulsky District in the Republic of Kalmykia; 46°10′N 45°21′E
- Peschanaya, alternative name of Malopeschanka, a selo in Malopeschanskaya Rural Territory of Mariinsky District in Kemerovo Oblast; 56°26′N 87°8′E
- Peschanoye, alternative name of Peschanskoye, a selo in Peschansky Selsoviet of Shchuchansky District in Kurgan Oblast; 55°41′N 62°43′E
- Peschany, alternative name of Chernigovo-Peschany, a khutor in Pervomayskoye Rural Settlement of Kasharsky District in Rostov Oblast; 48°48′N 41°17′E

== Bodies of water ==
- Peschanaya River, a left tributary of the Ob River, Russia
- Peschanoye (Burla basin), a lake in Burlinsky District, Altai Krai
- Peschanoye (Barnaulka basin), a lake in Topchikhinsky District, Altai Krai
- Peschanoye (lake, Belarus), a lake in the Brest Region, Belarus
- Peschanoye (lake, Kunashir), a lake in Sakhalin Oblast

== Other ==
- Peschanoye CSKA Stadium, former name of the Grigory Fedotov Stadium, Moscow

== See also ==
- Peschany
