= Tarnopol offensive =

World War I Central Powers counteroffensive of July 1917

- Part of the Eastern Front of World War I
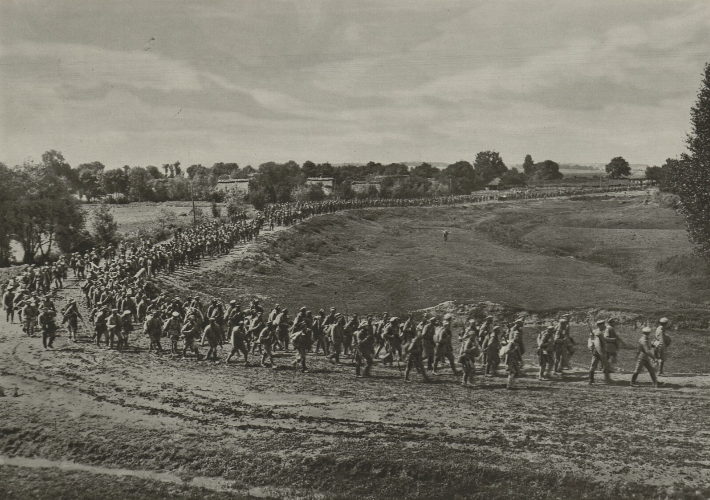
- The Russian Army's 1st Czechoslovak Rifle Regiment withdraws from Ternopil (now Tarnopol) near Starokonstantynów (now Starokostiantyniv) in the summer of 1917.
| Date | 19–28 July 1917 |
| Location | Eastern Galicia, Central Europe |
| Result | Central Powers victory |

Belligerents
| Russian Republic | Germany; Austria-Hungary |

Commanders and leaders
| Lavr Kornilov; Pyotr Baluyev; Fyodor Rerberg | (German Empire) Leopold of Bavaria; (German Empire) Arnold von Winckler; (German Empire) Felix Graf von Bothmer |

Units involved
| Southwestern Front: 11th Army | (German Empire) Army Group Winckler: Approximately 12 divisions |

Strength
| | As of 19 July 1917: 92,500 infantrymen 2,300 cavalrymen 935 guns 1,173 machine guns |

The Tarnopol Offensive was a successful counteroffensive the Central Powers conducted in the second half of July 1917 in eastern Galicia along the southern sector of the Eastern Front during World War I. The counteroffensive began with a Central Powers breakthrough against the Russian Southwestern Front between Zalosce (now Zaliztsi) and Zborów (now Zboriv) on 19 July 1917. The disintegration of the Russian Army facilitated the attack, and on 25 July the border town of Tarnopol (now Ternopil) fell to the Central Powers. The offensive ended on 28 July with the Central Powers having pushed the Russian 8th and 11th Armies back across the Zbrucz (now Zbruch) River almost to the border of Bessarabia.

== Background ==
The Kerensky offensive, a Russian Army summer offensive initiated by the Russian Provisional Government's Minister of War and Navy Alexander Kerensky at the beginning of July 1917, had failed to reach its objective of Lemberg (later Lwów, now Lviv). As early as 18 July, it had become clear to the Russian commander-in-chief, General Aleksei Brusilov, that his last major offensive had completely stalled and his days in Kerensky's war council were numbered. The Russian 11th Army under General Ivan Erdeli, positioned in the Brody area, covered the western approach to Tarnopol. Opposite the experienced German South Army under General of the Infantry Felix Graf von Bothmer, the Russian 7th Army held the same positions as it had at the beginning of July between Brzezany (now Berezhany) and Halicz (now Halych) on the Dniester River. South of the river, the Russian 8h Army was still on the offensive in the Kalusz (now Kalush) area. Farther south in Bukovina and the Carpathian Mountains, the Russian 9th Army under General Georgi Stupin remained on the defensive.

== Attack preparations ==
On 14 July 1917, the German Commander-in-Chief East, Generalfeldmarschall (Field Marshal) Leopold of Bavaria, and his staff moved their headquarters from Brest-Litovsk to Zloczow (now Zolochiv) to be closer to the portion of the front threatened by the Kerensky offensive. Even as the Russian attacks continued near Kalusz, the German High Command planned to launch its own counteroffensive in eastern Galicia. The Germans had brought six additional divisions to Galicia from the Western Front since the beginning of July for this purpose.

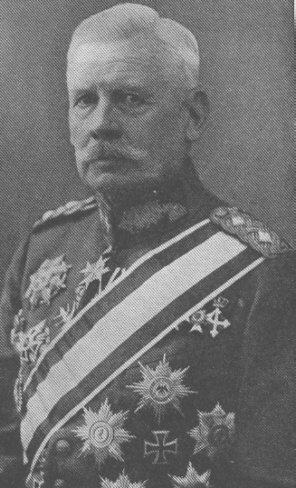
Arnold von Winckler, commander of the main thrust toward Tarnopol (now Ternopil).

The Germans conducted the attack in conjunction with the Austro-Hungarian Army's Army Group Böhm-Ermolli, which commanded the sector of attack. The Prussian General Arnold von Winckler, commander of the German I Army Corps in the Zloczow sector, took command of Army Group Winkler, an attack group whose main thrust was north of Zborów (now Zboriv) and which was tasked with breaking through the Russian front towards Tarnopol. On the first day of the attack, Winckler had eleven German and one-and-a-half Austro-Hungarian divisions at his disposal, comprising 124 1/2 infantry battalions, 24 cavalry squadrons, and 219 artillery batteries. Army Group Winckler was deployed between the Austro-Hungarian 4th Army and the Southern Army, replacing the Austro-Hungarian 2nd Army, and took over the sector of the Austro-Hungarian IX Corps, which had been defeated in the Kerensky offensive. After the breakthrough, the spearhead was to be reinforced with approximately 30,000 men, and the width of the breakthrough was to be increased by the advance to the south of the Southern Army, which comprised approximately 150,000 men. A period of rain made deployment difficult, as did the poor supply situation, which made sufficient fodder for horses scarce.

== Deployment of the Central Powers ==
Four corps groups were made available for the Central Powers' counterattack:

- The main thrust was carried out by the XXIII Reserve Corps under General Hugo von Kathen with the Austro-Hungarian 33rd Division (under Artur Iwanski) and the German 1st Guards Division (under Prince Eitel Friedrich of Prussia), 2nd Guards Division (under Friedrich von Friedeburg), and 6th Division (under Herhut von Rohden).
- Following behind in a second group was Albert von Berrer's group (Generalkommando 51) with the 5th Infantry Division (Hasso von Wedel) and 22nd Infantry Division (Kurt Kruge) as reserves. Behind them, the 42nd Infantry Division (Ludwig von Estorff) and the 92nd Infantry Division (Theodor Melior) assembled near Zloczow as army reserves.
- In the center, Karl Wilhelmi's group, comprising the German 197th and 237th Divisions (Walther Jacobi) and remnants of the Austro-Hungarian 32nd Division, under Feldmarschalleutnant (Lieutenant Field Marshal) Willerding, and 19th Division, under Feldmarschalleutnant Böltz, was to launch a secondary attack near Zborów. On the right flank – roughly between Zborów and Konjuchi (now Koniukhy) – stood the Beskid Corps (Max Paul Hofmann) with the Saxon 96th Infantry Division (von der Decken) and 223rd Infantry Division (Haernick).

The attack was later joined in the south by the German Southern Army of General der Infanterie (General of the Infantry) Felix Graf von Bothmer:

- On the left, the Austro-Hungarian Army's XXV Corps (Peter Hofmann) with the 54th Division (von Severus) and 55th Division (Unschuld).
- In the center was the XXV Reserve Corps under General Konstanz von Heineccius with the 241st Infantry Division, the 4th Replacement Division (von Werder) and the 15th Reserve Division (Limburg).
- On the right was the XXVII Reserve Corps under General der Kavallerie (General of the Cavalry) Krug von Nidda. Under his command were the 53rd Reserve Division (Leuthold) and 24th Reserve Division (Morgenstern-Döring) and the Hungarian 38th Honvéd Division (Molnar).

Meanwhile, on the south bank of the Dniester, the badly battered Austro-Hungarian 3rd Army was fighting in the Battle of Kalusz. Colonel General Karl Křitek replaced Karl Tersztyánszky von Nádas as its commander on 12 July 1917. On the left flank of the 3rd Army, in the crisis zone of Kalusz, the German Corps Group Litzmann (General Command XXXX Reserve Corps) had been in position since 15 July. This group comprised the German 83rd Infantry Division (Stumpff) and the Austro-Hungarian 15th Division (von Ausch), and had now also been assigned the 16th Reserve Division (Sieger) and the Bavarian 8th Reserve Division. On the right, the Hungarian Hadfy Group (XXVI Corps) formed a defensive wing with the 42nd Honvéd Division, the Austro-Hungarian 16th Division (von Kaltenborn) and Austro-Hungarian 36th Divisions, together with the 5th Division (Felix), which operated independently as far as the Pantyr Pass. This formed the dividing line with the Austro-Hungarian 7th Army under General Kövess, which, together with the German Carpathian Corps under Richard von Conta, covered the wooded Carpathian Mountains.

== The German counteroffensive ==
=== Breakthrough at Zalosce, 19 July ===
At 03:00 on 19 July 1917, a seven-hour artillery barrage involving 600 guns and 180 mortars launched the attack by Assault Group Winckler between Zborów and Zwyżyn (now Zvyzhen). The German counterattack was planned to cover a front of only 5 kilometres (3.1 miles) and was carried out with 92,500 infantrymen, 2,300 cavalrymen, 935 guns, and 1,173 machine guns.

Around 10:00, the German XXIII Reserve Corps launched a powerful infantry assault. On the left flank was the Austro-Hungarian 33rd Division, positioned between the Siret River near Ratyszcze (now Ratyshchi) and Zwyzyn. In the center were the 1st Guards and 2nd Guards Divisions near Manajów (now Manaiv), with the 6th Division behind them. Between Perepelniki (now Perepelnyky) and a point approximately 15 kilometres (9.3 miles) north of Zborów near Jaroslawice (now Yaroslavychi), the Wilhelmi Group, comprising the 197th Infantry Division, was positioned on the right. The Austro-Hungarian 33rd Division accompanied the attack on the left wing and, after the breakthrough, formed the northern flank protection towards the Siret. The first breakthrough, approximately 5 kilometres (3.1 miles) wide, was achieved in the sector held by the 6th Grenadier Division of the Russian 11th Army. As a result, the troops of the Russian XXV Corps also withdrew to Zalośce (now Zaliztsi). The German 6th Division captured Harbuzów (now Harbuziv) and the heights near Troscianiec (now Trostianets) and west of Ratyszcze. The 2nd Guards Division stormed Ratyszcze in the afternoon. The 1st Guards Division reached the Brodki Forest, and by evening the Germans had reached the Troscianec-Zaloczke line and achieved crossings of the Smolanka River. On the right, Berrer's Corps (5th and 22nd Divisions) was held up by congestion and crossings with the rear elements of the 6th Division in the marshy valley of the Siret River, while the 5th Division managed to advance southeast toward the town of Olejów (now Oliiv). Group Wilhelmi captured Złota Góra and Wertepy Heights and then wrested the heights near Zborów, defeating the Russian XVII Corps (3rd and 35th Divisions). Supporting attacks in the south by the 223rd Infantry Division of the Beskid Corps, fighting alongside the Russian V Corps, penetrated Koniuchy (now Koniukhy). By evening, a breakthrough 15 kilometres (9.3 miles) wide and 6 kilometres (3.7 miles) deep had been achieved, reaching the heights on both sides of Olejów and Zalosce. The Germans captured 2,900 prisoners and 10 artillery pieces, and increasing signs of disintegration among the Russians became apparent.

=== 20 July ===
On 20 July, Winckler's attack continued as planned. Wilhelmi's group and Berrer's corps advanced farther southeast on 20 July, gaining another 16 kilometres (9.9 miles) of ground south of the Siret River. The commander of the Russian 11th Army threw his reserve, the XXXXIX Corps, into the fray, but to no avail. A large portion of the Russian soldiers refused to attack again and deserted. The Russian XVII Corps abandoned its positions without resistance and withdrew to the Siret. The Russian V Corps thus faced a threat of encirclement on its northern flank and had to retreat to the Konjuchi-Kuklince line. The VI Corps, subordinate to the Russian 7th Army, received orders to withdraw its right wing to Budylow (now Budyliv) and attack the flank of the Central Powers forces who had broken through from the south. The Russian V Corps had already withdrawn via Kozlow (now Kozliv) to Myszkowice (now Myshkovychi). A 40-kilometre (25-mile) gap opened in the Russian front between Mikulince (now Mykulyntsi) and the Strypa River. Under pressure from both the front and the north, the Russian 7th Army also withdrew from its positions west of Halicz ahead of the Southern Army. The Russian VI Corps began to abandon its positions in front of the 96th and 223rd Infantry Divisions, while the German Beskid Corps advanced towards Augustówka (now Avhustivka) and Jozefowka (now Yosypivka). Simultaneously, the Austro-Hungarian XXV Corps attempted to recapture its old position near Byszki (now Byshky) on Konjuchibach Stream to facilitate the advance of the German 223rd Infantry Division at Konjuchi. During the night, General von Bothmer detached the 15th Reserve Division from its southern sector of the front with the XXV Reserve Corps to provide a reserve on the left flank of the Southern Army.

=== 21 July ===
On 21 July, Generalfeldmarschall (Field Marshal) Leopold of Bavaria assigned the 92nd Infantry Division to General Winckler's attack group for flank protection on the Siret River and also sent the 42nd Infantry Division to follow the breakthrough of the XXIII Reserve Corps. Winckler's attack between the Strypa and Siret rivers continued in a southeasterly direction. Winckler's troops advanced along the road to Tarnopol and on the southern bank of the Siret, breaking Russian resistance. Alongside his troops, the 5th, 6th, 22nd, 42nd, 92nd, 96th, and 223rd Infantry Divisions pursued the Russians in deep formation. The corps groups Kathen, Wilhelmi, and Berrer already had advanced into the western approach to Tarnopol at the Budyłów (now Budyliv)-Kozlov (now Kozliv) line. The retreating Russian V Corps halted again on the east bank of the Siret to make a stand. The commander of the Russian 8th Army, General Lavr Kornilov, directed his reserve in eastern Galicia, the XXXIV and XXXXV Corps, into the gaping hole between the Russian 7th and 11th Armies.

== Russian political events ==
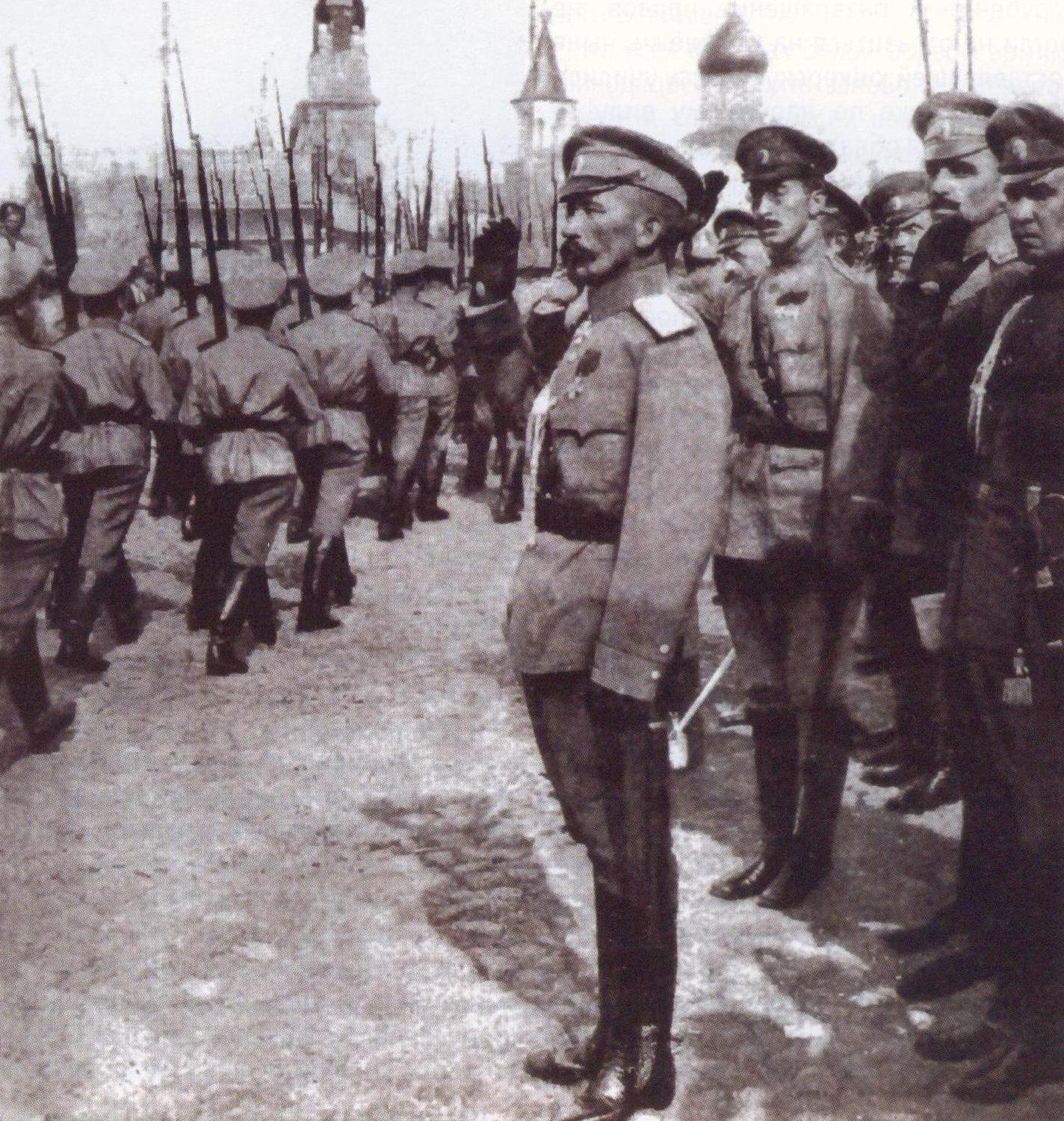
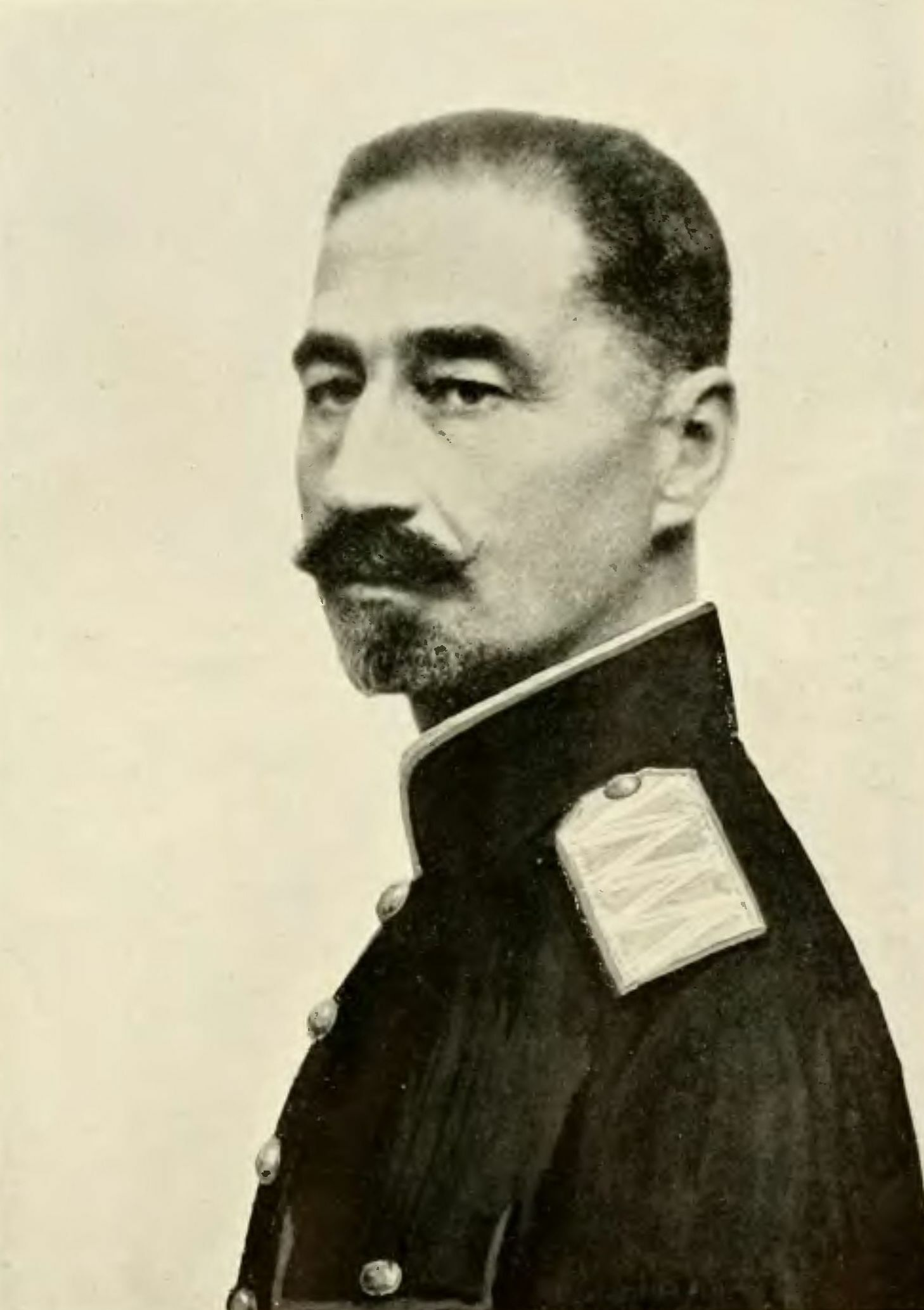
LEFT: General Lavr Kornilov reviews Moscow garrison troops in mid-August 1917. RIGHT: General Ivan Georgevich Erdeli, commander of the Russian 11th Army, was relieved of its command after its defeat.

In mid-July 1917, a Bolshevik-inspired uprising against the Russian Provisional Government broke out in Petrograd (now Saint Petersburg), and troops of the Western Front had to be withdrawn from the front to protect the capital. Russian troops used machine guns against the radical demonstrators, resulting in hundreds of deaths. Prime Minister Georgy Lvov resigned as a consequence and Alexander Kerensky replaced him as the head of the Provisional Government on 21 July.

Kerensky also remained Minister of War and Navy and oversaw a shake-up in the Russian command structure in the area of the Tarnopol offensive. He replaced General Alexei Gutor as commander-in-chief of the Southwestern Front with Lavr Kornilov. General Vladimir Cheremisov took command of the 8th Army. General Erdeli, commander of the defeated 11th Army, relinquished his position and assumed command of the Special Army positioned farther to the north, while the Special Army's previous commander, General Pyotr Baluyev, took command of the 11th Army and prepared the defense of Tarnopol itself, which was in danger of falling to the Central Powers. The southern wing of the 8th Army — positioned in the forested Carpathian Mountains and consisting of the XI, XXIII, and XVIII Corps — was transferred on 23 July to the newly inserted 1st Army under General Gleb Vannovsky.

Kornilov demanded that the Provisional Government reinstate the death penalty for combat troops. Mass executions of Russian deserters took place on the front in the area of the Central Powers breakthrough. As a deterrent, slips of paper with the word "Deserter" were placed on the bodies of those shot.

== Battle of Tarnopol ==
=== 22 July ===
The Russian 11th Army retreated along the Kozowa (now Kozova)-Tarnopol railway line. Strong Russian rear-guard elements temporarily halted the German advance 32 kilometres (20 miles) south of Brody. On the west bank of the Siret River, the Russian XVII, XXIV, and XXXXIX corps assembled between Zalośce and Tarnopol to mount renewed resistance. The Russian 1st Guards Corps, under General Vladimir Mai-Majewski, held a heavily fortified bridgehead near Tarnopol on the west bank of the Siret.

Army Group Winckler meticulously prepared for the attack on Tarnopol. In addition to the newly formed Melior Group (centered on the Austro-Hungarian 33rd Division) and the German 92nd Infantry Division, the XXIII Reserve Corps (1st Guards, 2nd Guards, and 6th Divisions), and Berrer Corps (5th and 22nd Divisions), the 42nd Division (von Estorff) was attached. The 2nd Guards Division (Friedeburg) took over flank protection to the northeast on the west bank of the Siret River, while the 92nd Division covered both sides of Zalośce. On the far left, the Austro-Hungarian 33rd Division under General Iwanski receuved orders to establish defensive positions between Ratyszcze and Zwyżyn to guard against Russian attacks from the north.

The Russian V Corps assembled near Myszkowice, south of Tarnopol. The gap in the front between it and the right wing of the Russian VI Corps, which also was the right wing of the Russian 7th Army as a whole, was still wide open. The Russian XXXXV Corps, ordered to move from Trembowla (now Terebovlia) to Tarnopol, reached the Tarnopol area, closely pursued by Wilhelmi's group and the Beskid Corps, which advanced via Kozłow and Budyłów and also crossed the Kozowa-Tarnopol railway line. The Russian 7th Army, with the XXXIV Corps brought up from the Podhajce (now Pidhaitsi) area, unsuccessfully attempted to close the gap in the Russian line between the Siret and the Strypa rivers.

=== 23 July ===
West of Tarnopol, the 1st Guards Division was unable immediately to overcome the strong resistance of the Russian Guards Corps. South of Tarnopol, the German 6th Division reached the Siret River, while troops of the German Generalkommando 51 established themselves on the river's right bank near Mikulince-Strusów (Strusiv). As the southern wing of the Austro-Hungarian 2nd Army advanced eastward between Strusow and Ratyszcze against stiffening Russian resistance, Wilhelmi's Group and the Beskid Corps swung south between the Siret and the Strypa Rivers. Between Mikulince and Burkanów (now Burkaniv), the opposing Russian XXXIV Corps under General Pavlo Skoropadski, reinforced by the 104th Division, was unable to hold off the Germans for long; thousands of Russian soldiers abandoned their trenches without a fight. The XXXIV Corps fled back to Trembowla, whereupon the remaining elements of the 7th Army — the VI, XLI, VII Siberian, and XXII (Finnish) Corps — continued their retreat via Burkanów and Podhajce to Olesza (now Olesha) and Monasterzyska (now Monastyryska). Wilhelmi's group and the Beskid Corps came under the command of the Southern Army that evening.

=== 24 July ===
On 24 July, Kornilov ordered the Russian armies north of the Pripyat River to cease all relief attacks. The commander-in-chief of the Russian Army's Western Front urgently requested that the X Corps and the Romanian Front send the XXIX Corps to reinforce the beleaguered Russian front in Galicia. Kornilov attempted to deploy his reserves against the breakthrough point, but his soldiers no longer obeyed orders: the bulk of the Russian Army refused to fight any longer. In the area of Wołoczyska (now Volochysk) alone, 12,000 Russian deserters fled, looting and committing atrocities during their retreat. On the left flank of the Southern Army, the 197th Infantry Division broke Russian resistance south of Darachów (now Darakhiv). The Beskid Corps repelled Russian counterattacks east of Burkanów and near Khmielovka (now Khmelivka).

=== 25–27 July ===
While the left wing of the Russian 7th Army and the right wing of the Russian 8th Army withdrew to the line Budzanów (now Budaniv)–Buczacz (now Buchach)–Niżniów (now Nyzhniv), the Russian 11th Army rallied to resist on the Siret River on 25 July. Berrer's corps had already crossed the Siret between Trembowla and Ostrów now (Ostroh) on 24 July, and now Baluyev committed his reserve, the Russian 151st Division, to meet it. The German 42nd Division, deployed on the southern flank of Berrer's group, pressed the left bank of the Siret and on 25 July pushed the Russians back across the railway line north of Trembowla.

On 25 July, the German Beskid Corps repelled strong Russian attacks in the area south of Trembowla and became bogged down west of Budzanów. With the Wilhelmi Group, elements of the 197th and 237th Infantry Divisions crossed the Siret River and occupied Janów (later Yaniv, now Ivano-Frankove). The Leibhusaren Brigade deployed against Czortków (now Chortkiv) to cut off the railway line to Buczacz .

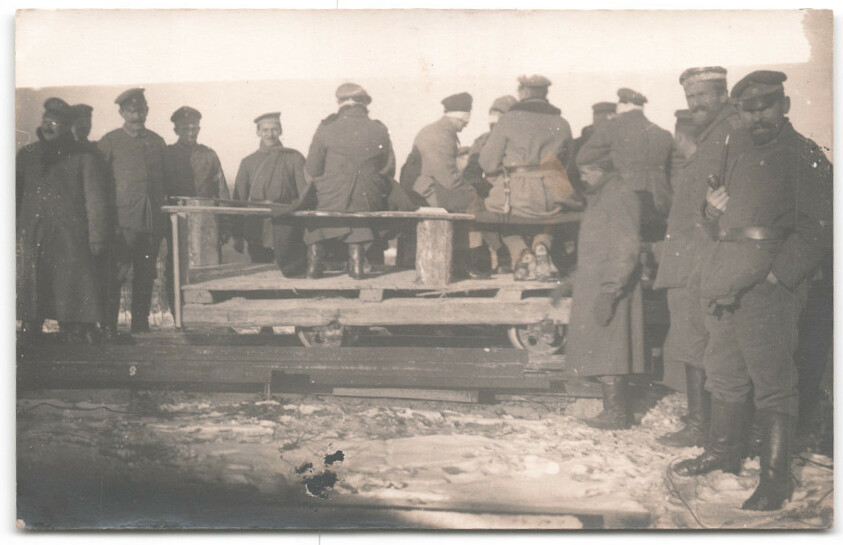
Blindfolded Russians are taken by field railway to the German regimental headquarters near Halicz (now Halych) for ceasefire negotiations in late July 1917.

On the morning of 25 July, the German 1st Guards Division unsuccessfully attempted to force a crossing of the Siret River near Czystylów (now Chystyliv). However, the 6th Division, advancing on the right flank of the XXII Reserve Corps, had already crossed the Siret near Trembowla and captured the heights southeast of Tarnopol. When the Russian I Guards Corps learned of the Russian V Corps's withdrawal to the Gniezna (now Hnizna) sector, it abandoned the Tarnopol bridgehead and surrendered the city to the Central Powers. The General Command Zloczów (IAK) had achieved its objective.

On 26 July, the Central Powers occupied the heights north of Tarnopol and established a bridgehead. That day, the Russians rallied to launch a counteroffensive and halted the advance of the Southern Army in heavy fighting on the Siret River. Meanwhile, the Russian 2nd Army made strong counterattacks in the Verezker Mountains that threatened the front of the Austro-Hungarian 1st Army in Moldavia.

On 27 July, the Central Powers captured Trembowla and pressed forward in the Gniezna sector. Only the southern wing of Army Group Winckler continued to follow the Southern Army, which was still advancing farther south to cover it. Winckler halted his advance northwest of Tarnopol at the Hleszczawa (now Hleshchava)-Czystyłów (now Chystyliv) line. By 28 July, the Central Powers had pushed the Russian 8th and 11th Armies back across the Zbrucz (now Zbruch) River almost to the border of Bessarabia, bringing the Tarnopol offensive to a conclusion.

== Aftermath ==
On 29 July 1917 Kerensky held a meeting with the commanders of the fronts at the Stavka of the Supreme Commander in Mogilev. On 2 August, Kerensky relieved Brusilov of his post as commander-in-chief and replaced him with Kornilov.

After the conclusion of the Tarnopol offensive, the Central Powers conducted additional offensive operations that resulted in the recapture of Bukovina and only ended on 15 August 1917 with the recovery of the territories of eastern Galicia Austria-Hungary had lost to Russia in the Battle of Galicia in August and September 1914. By the end of August 1917, the troops of the Russian Southwestern Front had been pushed back to the Zbrucz sector, where trench warfare resumed until the Treaty of Brest-Litovsk ended World War I on the Eastern Front in the spring of 1918.
