= Peschany =

Peschany or Peschanaya may refer to:

- Peschanaya, Irkutsk Oblast, a rural locality in Russia
- Peschany, Murmansk Oblast, a rural locality in Russia
- Peschany Island, an island in the Laptev Sea
- Qum Island or Peschany Island, an island in the Caspian Sea
- Peschanaya (river), a left tributary of the Ob River, Russia
- Cape Peschany or Cape Unslicht, a cape in Severnaya Zemlya
- Cape Peschany (Caspian Sea), a cape in Kazakhstan

== See also ==
- Peschanoye
