= Strusiv Monastery =

The Saint Nicholas Monastery (Ukrainian: Струсівський монастир Святого Миколая) is a Basilian monastery of the Ukrainian Greek Catholic Church in Strusiv, in the Mykulyntsi Hromada, Ternopil Raion, Ternopil Oblast.

== History ==
At the turn of the 16th and 17th centuries, a monastery emerged in Strusiv. It was founded by two monks who carved out a cave complex with the Church of St. Nicholas in the rocky massif on the left bank of the Seret River.

After the Cossack Wars and the period of the Ruin (Ruina), the monastery fell into decline, and it was destroyed during the Turkish-Tatar raids. In 1767, the Voivode of Kyiv, Franciszek Salezy Potocki, allocated the necessary funds for the reconstruction of the monastery and the church, handing them over for use by the Basilian. On 17 August 1771, he solidified this decision with a foundation act, in which he detailed the contribution: land was allocated for a monastery for twelve monks, a church, an economic folwark (manor farm), other buildings, as well as 60 thousand złotys (or gold coins) for construction needs.

In December 1772, the Czech architect Johan Kasper Selner completed the development of the project for the new monastic complex. Just two years later, a new Baroque monastery, along with a church consecrated in honor of Saint Nicholas, was built on the site where the old cave church had previously been located.

In 1787, the Austrian government issued a decree known as the "Josephine Suppressions" (or "Josephine Reform"), according to which the monastery was dissolved. The monks were dispersed, being transferred to monasteries in Buchach and Ulashkivtsi, and all monastic property was sold for 31,750 florins. The church was handed over to the Roman Catholic community for use as a kostel (church), but it burned down in 1891.

For almost an entire century, the monastery church remained neglected. In 1993, it was returned to its rightful owner—the Basilian Fathers—by a decision of the Ternopil Oblast State Administration. The renewal of the parish and monastic activity was led by the Hegumen of the Buchach Monastery, Father Ivan Maikovych. He collaborated with architects from "Ukrzakhidproektrestavratsiia" led by Mykola Haida. Thanks to the joint efforts of the Buchach Monastery and local parishioners, the church was completely rebuilt, the ancient cave church was restored, and work on the iconostasis was completed. Currently, the monastery operates under eparchial law.

On the parish territory, a cross has been erected and consecrated at the site where the construction of a chapel dedicated to the Blessed Mykola Konrad and Mykola Tsehelskyi is planned. Furthermore, the communities "Mothers in Prayer" and the brotherhood "Apostleship of Prayer" actively function in the parish. Children's camps called "Merry Holidays with God" are regularly organized, and a parish choir is active. As of 2014, recently, renovation work was carried out in the church, and a new bell was acquired.

== Hegumens ==
- Hegumen Epifanii Lakhotskyi
- Ivan Damaskyn Stakhniakevych (1773/74)
- Onufrii Kryzhanovskyi (1775/76)
- Venedykt Ploshchanskyi (1776)
- Ivan Maikovych, OSBM (1993—?)
- Symeon Chmola
- Tadei Mysiuk
- Teodor Nahorniak, OSBM (from ?)
