= Pishchane =

Pishchane (Ukrainian: Піщане) may refer to several localities in Ukraine:

- Pishchane, Pokrovsk Raion, Donetsk Oblast
- Pishchane, Kharkiv Oblast
- Pishchane, Ternopil Oblast

== See also ==
- Peschanoye
