= Viktor Lupiichuk =

Ukrainian woodcarver (1960–2023)

- Віктор Володимирович Лупійчук
- Born: 9 November 1960; Ternopil
- Died: 9 July 2023 (aged 62)
- Education: Ternopil Pedagogical Institute
- Occupation: Woodcarver
- Awards: Yaroslava Muzyka Prize

Viktor Lupiichuk (Ukrainian: Віктор Володимирович Лупійчук; 9 November 1960 – 9 July 2023) was a Ukrainian woodcarver. He was the son of Volodymyr Lupiichuk. He received diplomas and awards at exhibitions (1987, 1988, 1989, 1999).

== Biography ==
Viktor Lupiichuk was born on 9 November 1960, in Ternopil. He graduated from the Ternopil Pedagogical Institute in 1981. He learned carving from his father. In Ternopil, he worked as a leader of woodcarving clubs at the Palace of Pioneers (1982-1993) and at the Center for Children's Creativity, and as the head of the folk crafts school department (1993-2004).

He died on 9 July 2023.

He was buried on 11 July 2023, in the village of Hai-Roztotski, Ternopil Raion.

== Creativity ==
He participated in exhibitions in Ternopil (1983, 1985-2000), Kyiv (1982, 1984-1985, 1987-1988, 1994, 2000), Sliven (1982; Bulgaria), and Zbarazh (2013). He is the author of wooden iconostases in churches in Ternopil (the Church of the Zarvanytsia Mother of God and the Church of the Holy Princes Borys and Hlib).

Sculptures: "Hopak" (1982), "Sviatoslav" (1983), "Hamaliia", "T. Shevchenko" (both 1984), "Nestor the Chronicler" (1988), "Volokh" (1988; 2003), "Forward" (1992), "Victory" (2000), "Bandurist" (2004), "God, Protect Ukraine" (2010); a series of reliefs on Shevchenko themes (2013). His works are in the Ternopil Regional Art Museum, churches, libraries, and the author's private collections.

== Awards ==
- Yaroslava Muzyka Prize (2021, posthumously).

== Bibliography ==
- Гриб А. Барвисті джерела. — Тернопіль : Амбер, 1998. — 150 c.
- Приступа, І. Майстер з дерев'яних ангелів // 20 хвилин. — 2009. — 20 берез. — С. 18.
- Сирник, І. Майстер ангелів // Експрес. — 2009. — 24-25 берез. — С. 12.
- Мар'янів, Н. Вчився на вчителя, став різьбярем // Місто. — 2009. — 25 берез. — С. 7.
- Сагаль, О. Віктор Лупійчук: «Коли дивлюся по телевізору виступи відомих політиків, бачу в них у кабінетах свої роботи» // Нова Тернопільська газета. — 2009. — 19-25 серп. — С. 6.
- Якель, Р. У його творчості — історія народу // Культура і життя. — 2020. — № 22 (27 листоп.). — С. 10.
- Терлюк, І. «Мистецтву різьби мене вчило саме життя»: історія митця з Тернопільщини // Суспільне Новини. — 2022. — 3 лютого.
- Іноземцева Ю., Єпур, В. Його витворами захоплюється вся Україна! Історія «сільського філософа» Віктора Лупійчука (репортаж) // 20 хвилин Тернопіль. — 2022. — 2 червня.
