= Zaliztsi Castle =

Castle in Zaliztsi, Ternopil Oblast, Ukraine

- Залозецький замок
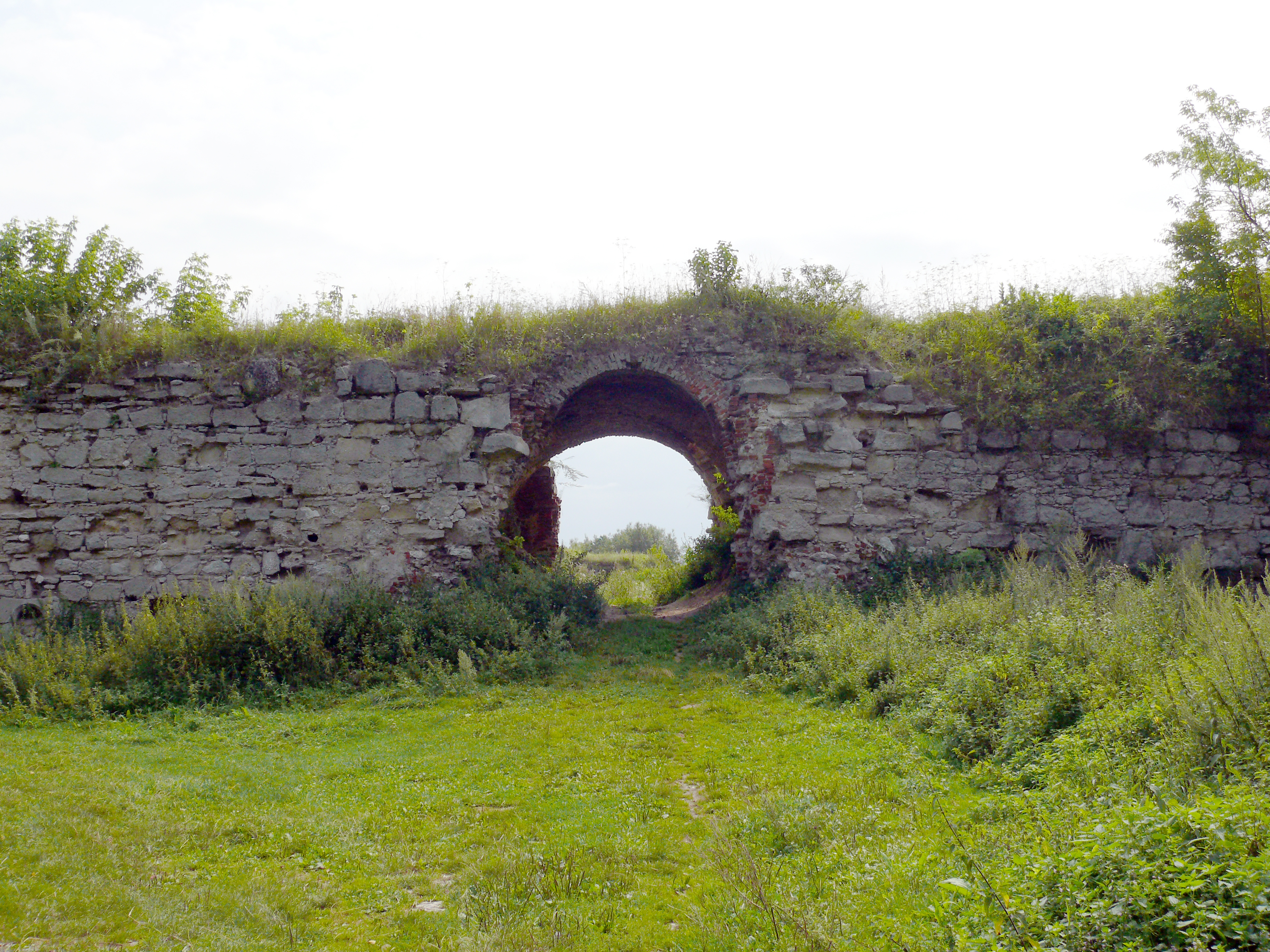
- Ruins of the castle

General information
- Status: Architectural monument of national importance
- Location: Zaliztsi, Ternopil Raion, Ternopil Oblast, Ukraine
- Coordinates: 49°47′42″N 25°22′44″E

Immovable Monument of National Significance of Ukraine
- Official name: Замок (мур.) (Castle (stone))
- Type: Architecture
- Reference no.: 190054

The Zaliztsi Castle (Ukrainian: Залозецький замок, romanized: Zalozets'kyi zamok) is located in Zaliztsi, Ternopil Oblast, Ukraine. A defensive castle built in 1516 by Marcin Kamieniecki of the coat of arms of Pilawa, Voivode of Podolia, on the Seret River, and an architectural monument of national significance.

== History ==
The village of Zaliztsi, along with surrounding villages, belonged in the 15th century to the vast Olesko estate, which, after the death of Jan of Sienno, fell to his son Piotr, from a division made in 1477. Piotr left two daughters: Anna, married to Fryderyk Herburt, castellan of Bielecki, and Jadwiga, married to Marcin Kamieniecki, governor of Podolia[2]. At the time when the castle was owned by Prince Konstanty Wiśniowiecki, Tsar False Dmitry I was a guest within the walls of the fortress in 1603, and there he devised a plan for an expedition to Moscow. Prince Jeremi Wiśniowiecki, father of Polish King Michał Korybut Wiśniowiecki, spent his youth in the castle. In 1649 the stronghold was captured and destroyed by Cossack troops. Prince Dymitr Wiśniowiecki rebuilt the castle and restored it to its former glory. In 1675 it was besieged again, this time by Turkish troops. The Bashas, according to Turkish custom, decided to seek divination before proceeding with the siege. A black hen was released from the Turkish camp towards the castle, tracking where it would turn. With a clucking sound, the hen returned to the Muslim ranks. The Turks abandoned the siege. The next owners were the Sobieski family and after them the Potocki family.

== Architecture ==
At the end of the 16th century, the castle was a huge four-winged fortress, built of stone and brick on a quadrangular plan. It was built two stories high and extended along a northwest–southeast axis. Standing in the midst of the inaccessible wetlands of the Seret River, surrounded by a defensive wall, it was a difficult fortress to conquer. The entrance led through a drawbridge and a gate in the south wing. At the corners were four polygonal, three-story towers with shooting holes. In front of the castle was a pre-castle surrounded by a wall and water. The entrance gate, with traces of a drawbridge was located in the south wing. To the right of the gate was a lofty quadrilateral tower with a clock, covered with a dome. By the end of the 19th century, the castle's perimeter walls and towers were scratched and chipped in many places, with plaster and battered window frames visible in places. Under the castle were extensive cellars, used in part for beer storage and in part collapsed. The brick buildings of the economic part of the castle stood on either side of the gate. There were three on the left side and two on the right. They housed, among other things, stables, coach houses, a granary, etc. What the bailey lacked space for was housed in the castle wing adjacent to the gate. So there was a bakery, laundry, pantry, as well as warehouses. All this was located on the first floor, while the first floor was occupied by the owner's rooms, guest rooms, as well as the library, treasury, billiard and cafe room and the castle chapel. The rooms had white tiled stoves and the entire roof was covered with tiles. In 1920–1950, local residents took building material from the castle ruins for their needs.

== Residence ==
The castle was significantly beautified by Józef Potocki, Great Hetman of the Crown, turning it into a magnate's residence. After his death in 1751, the building began to deteriorate. Ignacy count Miączyński, chamberlain to the last king of Poland Stanisław August Poniatowski, acquired the almost ruins in 1790 and set up a cloth factory in the decaying residence, which was closed after a few years and turned into a blanket-kilim factory of załoziecki, but this too did not last long. When Włodzimierz Count Dzieduszycki became the owner of the castle there was a brewery in the castle. By the end of the 19th century, the once defensive castle was in ruins, and its substantial remains were partially inhabited and converted into a brewery and stables. During World War I, the former fortress was turned to rubble.

== Modern times ==
The castle remains in the form of fragments of a ruin, which rises to the maximum level of a fourth of the original buildings. In some places the building is demolished to its foundations. The best preserved is a small part of the southwestern and northwestern wall up to the height of one story, as well as the basement of the palace, located in the southeastern part. In the preserved northwestern part of the complex are the casemates of the building, originally two-story high, as well as the arched main gate and the corner five-sided tower. The basement of the five-story tower, covered by a semicircular arch, has also survived. Two stone carved coats of arms of the castle's owners have been preserved on the outer north wall of the tower: Pilawa, Róża and Poraj.
