= Prasolov =

Prasolov (Russian or Ukrainian: Прасолов) is a Russian masculine surname. It originates from the obsolete Russian word prasol, which referred to a traveling wholesale dealer in salt, meat, fish or/and livestock. Its feminine counterpart is Prasolova. Notable people with the surname include:

- Anastasiya Prasolova (born 1989), Azerbaijani rhythmic gymnast and coach
- Ihor Prasolov (born 1962), Russian-born Ukrainian politician
