= Strusiv Castle =

Castle in Strusiv, Ternopil Oblast, Ukraine

- Струсівський замок
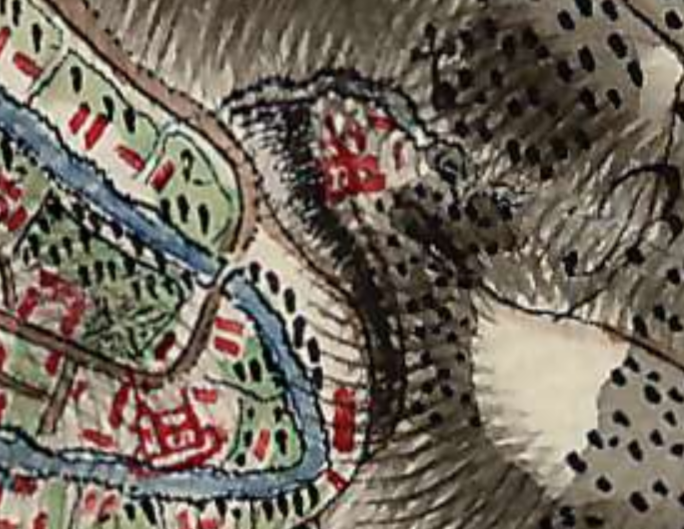
- Strusiv Castle on the map by Friedrich von Mieg, 18th century

General information
- Location: Strusiv, Ternopil Raion, Ternopil Oblast
- Country: Ukraine
- Coordinates: 49°20′32.7″N 25°37′35.5″E

The Strusiv Castle (Ukrainian: Струсівський замок, romanized: Strusivs'kyi zamok) is a defensive castle built in Strusiv, Ternopil Oblast.

== Location ==
The castle was located in the Chortova Debra tract.

== History ==
The site for erecting the castle was chosen on the left bank of the Seret River, which is a left tributary of the Dniester. Thus, the castle was located on one side of the river, while the city was on the other. The fortification significantly towered over the river valley, so there was a good view of the entire city from the castle. It is likely that the castle not only protected the approach to the city from the north, but also controlled the main roads leading to it. During the first period of Bohdan Khmelnytskyi's rebellion in 1648, Cossack-Tartar troops seized the castle, and the Tatars looted and almost completely destroyed the town. St. Nicholas Basilian Orthodox Church was built on the site of the castle.

== Architecture ==
In the first half of the 17th century, the castle was rectangular in shape, measuring about 100 by 150 meters, and was protected by earthen ramparts and ditches, as well as stone fortifications. At the turn of the 19th and 20th centuries, by order of Countess Lanckorońska, the castle's surviving buildings were demolished for building materials. Remnants of the castle's defensive walls, walls and ditches have survived to the present day.

== See also ==
- Strusiv Palace
