= Mykola Tsehelskyi =

Ukrainian priest and martyr

Mykola Tsehelskyi (Ukrainian: Мико́ла Цеге́льський; December 17, 1896 – May 25, 1951), sometimes rendered as Nicholas Tsehelskyi, was a Ukrainian Greek Catholic priest, considered to be a martyr by the Catholic Church for his refusal to convert even under duress.

Tsehelskyi was born on December 17, 1896 in the village of Strusiv, Ternopil Region in what was then Austria-Hungary. In 1923, he graduated from the Lviv University's theology faculty. On April 5, 1925, Andrey Sheptytsky ordained Tsehelskyi to the priesthood and he was assigned to a parish.

At that time he was married and he would later have four children.

He served as a parish priest in Soroka, Hrymailivsk deanery and later as the pastor of the Archeparchy of Lviv.

At the end of World War II, the Soviet authorities began to pressure Tsehelskyi to convert to the Russian Orthodox Church, threatening to beat him. He refused to convert. On October 28, 1946, Tsehelskyi was arrested and on January 27, 1947, was sentenced to ten years in prison in the Moldova SSR. After his imprisonment, his family was exiled to Chita in Russia.

While in prison, Tsehelskyi wrote to his wife, saying "My dearest wife, the feast of the Dormition was our 25th wedding anniversary. I recall fondly our family life together, and every day in my dreams I am with you and the children, and this makes me happy […] I happily give a fatherly kiss to all their foreheads and I hope to live honestly, behaving blamelessly, keeping far from everything that is foul. I pray for this most of all."

On May 25, 1951, Tsehelskyi died in prison in Moldova and was buried in the camp cemetery.

On April 24, 2001, Pope John Paul II officially recognised him as a martyr of the faith.
