= Mylne, Ternopil Oblast =

Rural locality in Ternopil Oblast, Ukraine

Mylne Мильне
- Location in Ternopil Oblast
- Coordinates: 49°47′54″N 25°28′37″E
- Country: Ukraine
- Oblast: Ternopil Oblast
- Raion: Ternopil Raion
- Hromada: Zaliztsi settlement hromada
- Time zone: UTC+2 (EET)
  - Summer (DST): UTC+3 (EEST)
- Postal code: 47233

Mylne (Ukrainian: Мильне) is a village in Zaliztsi settlement hromada, Ternopil Raion, Ternopil Oblast, Ukraine.

== History ==
The first written mention of the village was in 1482.

After the liquidation of the Zboriv Raion on 19 July 2020, the village became part of the Ternopil Raion.

== Religion ==
- Church of the Nativity of the Blessed Virgin Mary (1906, brick, the brick for the construction of the church was dedicated in 1904 by UGCC Metropolitan Andrei Sheptytskyi);
- Roman Catholic church (1914, destroyed during the World War I; rebuilt in the 1920s).

== Sources ==
- (in Ukrainian) Безкоровайна Н., Ковальков Ю., Мильне // Ternopil Encyclopedic Dictionary: in 4 v. / editorial board: H. Yavorskyi and other, Ternopil: "Zbruch", 2005, V. 2: К—О, S. 514. — ISBN 966-528-199-2.
- "Milno". Geographical Dictionary of the Kingdom of Poland (in Polish). 6. Warszawa: Kasa im. Józefa Mianowskiego. 1885. p. 429.
