= Zaliztsi settlement hromada =

Hromada in Ternopil Oblast, Ukraine

Zaliztsi settlement hromada Залозецька селищна громада
- hromada
- Location within Ternopil Oblast Location within Ukraine
- Coordinates: 49°47′45″N 25°22′41″E
- Country: Ukraine
- Oblast: Ternopil Oblast
- Raion: Ternopil Raion
- Administrative center: Zaliztsi

Government
  - Hromada head: Andrii Noha

Area
  - Total: 248.6 km^{2} (96.0 sq mi)

Population (2022)
  - Total: 10,402
- Urban-type settlement: 1
- Villages: 17
- Website: zaliztsi-rada.gov.ua

Zaliztsi settlement hromada (Ukrainian: Залозецька селищна територіальна громада, romanized: Zalozetska selyshchna terytorialna hromada is a hromada in Ukraine, in Ternopil Raion of Ternopil Oblast. The administrative center is the urban-type settlement of Zaliztsi. Its population is 10,402 (2022 estimate)

It was formed on 14 September 2016 by amalgamation of Zaliztsi town council and Bilohovy, Hai-za-Rudoiu, Ratyshche, Seretets, Trostianets, Chystopady rural councils of Zboriv Raion.

== Settlements ==
The community consists of 1 urban-type settlement (Zaliztsi) and 17 villages:

- Biloholovy
- Bilokrynytsia
- Blikh
- Hai-za-Rudoiu
- Hai-Roztotski
- Zahiria
- Mylne
- Neterpyntsi
- Panasivka
- Pidberiztsi
- Pishchane
- Ratyshchi
- Reniv
- Seretets
- Trostianets
- Chystopady
- Chornyi Lis
