= Zahiria, Ternopil Oblast =

Rural locality in Ternopil Oblast, Ukraine

Zahiria Загір'я
- Location in Ternopil Oblast
- Coordinates: 49°51′55″N 25°26′03″E
- Country: Ukraine
- Oblast: Ternopil Oblast
- Raion: Ternopil Raion
- Hromada: Zaliztsi settlement hromada
- Time zone: UTC+2 (EET)
  - Summer (DST): UTC+3 (EEST)
- Postal code: 47211

Zahiria (Ukrainian: Загір'я) is a village in Zaliztsi settlement hromada, Ternopil Raion, Ternopil Oblast, Ukraine.

== History ==
The first written mention of the village was in 1546.

After the liquidation of the Zboriv Raion on 19 July 2020, the village became part of the Ternopil Raion.

== Religion ==
- Church of the Resurrection (1875; brick).

== Sources ==
- (in Ukrainian) Базилевська З., Уніят В., Хоміцький З., Загір'я // Ternopil Encyclopedic Dictionary: in 4 v. / editorial board: H. Yavorskyi and other, Ternopil: "Zbruch", 2004, V. 1: А—Й, S. 594—595. — ISBN 966-528-197-6.
- "Zagórze (14)". Geographical Dictionary of the Kingdom of Poland (in Polish). 14. Warszawa: Kasa im. Józefa Mianowskiego. 1895. p. 267.
