= Biloholovy =

Rural locality in Ternopil Oblast, Ukraine

Biloholovy Білоголови
- Location in Ternopil Oblast Biloholovy (Ukraine)
- Coordinates: 49°45′23″N 25°19′48″E
- Country: Ukraine
- Oblast: Ternopil Oblast
- Raion: Ternopil Raion
- Hromada: Zaliztsi settlement hromada
- Time zone: UTC+2 (EET)
  - Summer (DST): UTC+3 (EEST)
- Postal code: 47236

Biloholovy (Ukrainian: Білоголови) is a village in Zaliztsi settlement hromada, Ternopil Raion, Ternopil Oblast, Ukraine.

== History ==
The first written mention of the village was in 1649.

After the liquidation of the Zboriv Raion on 19 July 2020, the village became part of the Ternopil Raion.

== Religion ==
- Two churches of the Blessed Virgin Mary (1928, rebuilt from a Roman Catholic church) and the Cathedral of the Blessed Virgin Mary (2014).

== Sources ==
- (in Ukrainian) Кравчик М., Уніят В., Білоголови // Ternopil Encyclopedic Dictionary: in 4 v. / editorial board: H. Yavorskyi and other, Ternopil: "Zbruch", 2004, V. 1: А—Й, S. 134. — ISBN 966-528-197-6.
- "Białogłowy". Geographical Dictionary of the Kingdom of Poland (in Polish). 1. Warszawa: Kasa im. Józefa Mianowskiego. 1880. p. 189.
