= Pidberiztsi, Ternopil Oblast =

Rural locality in Ternopil Oblast, Ukraine

Pidberiztsi Підберізці
- Location in Ternopil Oblast
- Coordinates: 49°51′26″N 25°20′49″E
- Country: Ukraine
- Oblast: Ternopil Oblast
- Raion: Ternopil Raion
- Hromada: Zaliztsi settlement hromada
- Time zone: UTC+2 (EET)
  - Summer (DST): UTC+3 (EEST)
- Postal code: 47212

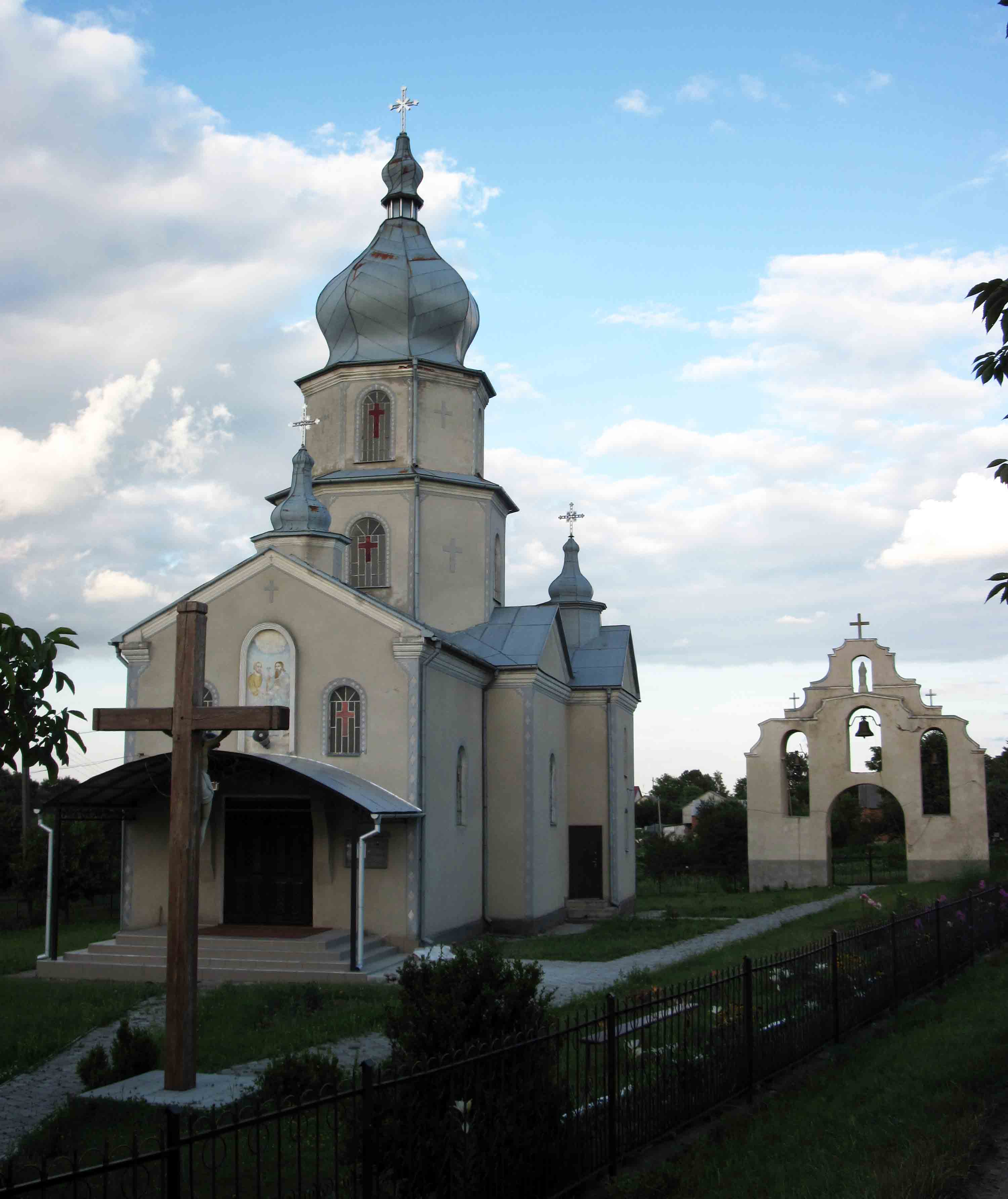
Church of St. Apostles Peter and Paul (1993) in Pidberiztsi, Zboriv district, Ternopil region

Pidberiztsi (Ukrainian: Підберізці) is a village in Zaliztsi settlement hromada, Ternopil Raion, Ternopil Oblast, Ukraine.

== History ==
The first written mention of the village was in 1640.

After the liquidation of the Zboriv Raion on 19 July 2020, the village became part of the Ternopil Raion.

== Religion ==
- Saints Peter and Paul church (1993).

== Sources ==
- (in Ukrainian) Макар С., Хаварівський Б., Підберізці // Ternopil Encyclopedic Dictionary: in 4 v. / editorial board: H. Yavorskyi and other, Ternopil: "Zbruch", 2008, V. 3: П—Я, S. 71. — ISBN 978-966-528-279-2.
- "Podbereźce (pow. brodzki)". Geographical Dictionary of the Kingdom of Poland (in Polish). 8. Warszawa: Kasa im. Józefa Mianowskiego. 1887. p. 359.
