= Trostianets, Zaliztsi settlement hromada, Ternopil Raion, Ternopil Oblast =

Rural locality in Ternopil Oblast, Ukraine

Trostianets Тростянець
- Location in Ternopil Oblast
- Coordinates: 49°47′11″N 25°16′55″E
- Country: Ukraine
- Oblast: Ternopil Oblast
- Raion: Ternopil Raion
- Hromada: Zaliztsi settlement hromada
- Time zone: UTC+2 (EET)
  - Summer (DST): UTC+3 (EEST)
- Postal code: 47226

Trostianets (Ukrainian: Тростянець) is a village in Zaliztsi settlement hromada, Ternopil Raion, Ternopil Oblast, Ukraine.

== History ==
The first written mention of the village was in 1472.

After the liquidation of the Zboriv Raion on 19 July 2020, the village became part of the Ternopil Raion.

== Religion ==
- Saint Paraskeva church (1893, destroyed in 1944, rebuilt from a church in the 1950s).

== Sources ==
- (in Ukrainian) Мельничук Б., Уніят В., Тростянець // Ternopil Encyclopedic Dictionary: in 4 v. / editorial board: H. Yavorskyi and other, Ternopil: "Zbruch", 2008, V. 3: П—Я, S. 470. — ISBN 978-966-528-279-2.
- "Trościaniec Wielki". Geographical Dictionary of the Kingdom of Poland (in Polish). 12. Warszawa: Kasa im. Józefa Mianowskiego. 1892. p. 509.
