= Chystopady =

Rural locality in Ternopil Oblast, Ukraine

Chystopady Чистопади
- Location in Ternopil Oblast
- Coordinates: 49°48′53″N 25°20′19″E
- Country: Ukraine
- Oblast: Ternopil Oblast
- Raion: Ternopil Raion
- Hromada: Zaliztsi settlement hromada
- Time zone: UTC+2 (EET)
  - Summer (DST): UTC+3 (EEST)
- Postal code: 47234

Chystopady (Ukrainian: Чистопади) is a village in Zaliztsi settlement hromada, Ternopil Raion, Ternopil Oblast, Ukraine.

== History ==
The first written mention of the village was in 1469.

After the liquidation of the Zboriv Raion on 19 July 2020, the village became part of the Ternopil Raion.

== Religion ==
- Two churches of St. Michael (1923, wooden; 1995, brick),
- Roman Catholic church (1939).

== Sources ==
- (in Ukrainian) Мельничук Б., Новосядла Н., Чистопада // Ternopil Encyclopedic Dictionary: in 4 v. / editorial board: H. Yavorskyi and other, Ternopil: "Zbruch", 2008, V. 3: П—Я, S. 599. — ISBN 978-966-528-279-2.
- Зборівщина: історія і сьогодення: Історико-краєзнавчий нарис / укл. М. Б. Бігус, Тернопіль: Воля, 2008, 480 s.
- "Czystopady". Geographical Dictionary of the Kingdom of Poland (in Polish). 1. Warszawa: Kasa im. Józefa Mianowskiego. 1880. p. 886.
