= Chornyi Lis, Zaliztsi settlement hromada, Ternopil Raion, Ternopil Oblast =

Rural locality in Ternopil Oblast, Ukraine

Chornyi Lis Чорний Ліс
- Location in Ternopil Oblast
- Coordinates: 49°55′1″N 25°23′34″E
- Country: Ukraine
- Oblast: Ternopil Oblast
- Raion: Ternopil Raion
- Hromada: Zaliztsi settlement hromada
- Time zone: UTC+2 (EET)
  - Summer (DST): UTC+3 (EEST)
- Postal code: 47211

Chornyi Lis (Ukrainian: Чорний Ліс) is a village in Zaliztsi settlement hromada, Ternopil Raion, Ternopil Oblast, Ukraine.

== History ==
The first written mention of the village was in 1939.

After the liquidation of the Zboriv Raion on 19 July 2020, the village became part of the Ternopil Raion.

== Religion ==
- St. George church (1995, brick),
- Church of the Assumption (1997, brick).

== Sources ==
- (in Ukrainian) Ковальков Ю., Чорний Ліс // Ternopil Encyclopedic Dictionary: in 4 v. / editorial board: H. Yavorskyi and other, Ternopil: "Zbruch", 2008, V. 3: П—Я, S. 602. — ISBN 978-966-528-279-2.
