= Hai-za-Rudoiu =

Rural locality in Ternopil Oblast, Ukraine

Hai-za-Rudoiu Гаї-за-Рудою
- Location in Ternopil Oblast
- Coordinates: 49°49′36″N 25°22′48″E
- Country: Ukraine
- Oblast: Ternopil Oblast
- Raion: Ternopil Raion
- Hromada: Zaliztsi settlement hromada
- Time zone: UTC+2 (EET)
  - Summer (DST): UTC+3 (EEST)
- Postal code: 47231

Hai-za-Rudoiu (Ukrainian: Гаї-за-Рудою) is a village in Zaliztsi settlement hromada, Ternopil Raion, Ternopil Oblast, Ukraine.

== History ==
The first written mention of the village was in 1785.

After the liquidation of the Zboriv Raion on 19 July 2020, the village became part of the Ternopil Raion.

== Religion ==
- St. George church (1992).

== Sources ==
- (in Ukrainian) В. Уніят., Гаї-за-Рудою // Ternopil Encyclopedic Dictionary: in 4 v. / editorial board: H. Yavorskyi and other, Ternopil: "Zbruch", 2004, V. 1: А—Й, S. 321. — ISBN 966-528-197-6.
- "Gaje za Rudą (część Załoźców)". Geographical Dictionary of the Kingdom of Poland (in Polish). 14. Warszawa: Kasa im. Józefa Mianowskiego. 1895. p. 354.
