= Seretets =

Rural locality in Ternopil Oblast, Ukraine

Seretets Серетець
- Location in Ternopil Oblast
- Coordinates: 49°51′38″N 25°23′03″E
- Country: Ukraine
- Oblast: Ternopil Oblast
- Raion: Ternopil Raion
- Hromada: Zaliztsi settlement hromada
- Time zone: UTC+2 (EET)
  - Summer (DST): UTC+3 (EEST)
- Postal code: 47212

Seretets (Ukrainian: Серетець) is a village in Zaliztsi settlement hromada, Ternopil Raion, Ternopil Oblast, Ukraine.

== History ==
The first written mention of the village was in 1640.

After the liquidation of the Zboriv Raion on 19 July 2020, the village became part of the Ternopil Raion.

== Religion ==
- Church of the Nativity of the Blessed Virgin Mary (1750, wooden),
- Church of All Saints of the Ukrainian People (2006).

== Sources ==
- (in Ukrainian) Ковальков Ю., Макар С., Серетець // Ternopil Encyclopedic Dictionary: in 4 v. / editorial board: H. Yavorskyi and other, Ternopil: "Zbruch", 2008, V. 3: П—Я, S. 251. — ISBN 978-966-528-279-2.
- "Seredec". Geographical Dictionary of the Kingdom of Poland (in Polish). 10. Warszawa: Kasa im. Józefa Mianowskiego. 1889. p. 450.
