= Neterpyntsi =

Rural locality in Ternopil Oblast, Ukraine

Neterpyntsi Нетерпинці
- Location in Ternopil Oblast
- Coordinates: 49°44′39″N 25°21′33″E
- Country: Ukraine
- Oblast: Ternopil Oblast
- Raion: Ternopil Raion
- Hromada: Zaliztsi settlement hromada
- Time zone: UTC+2 (EET)
  - Summer (DST): UTC+3 (EEST)
- Postal code: 47236

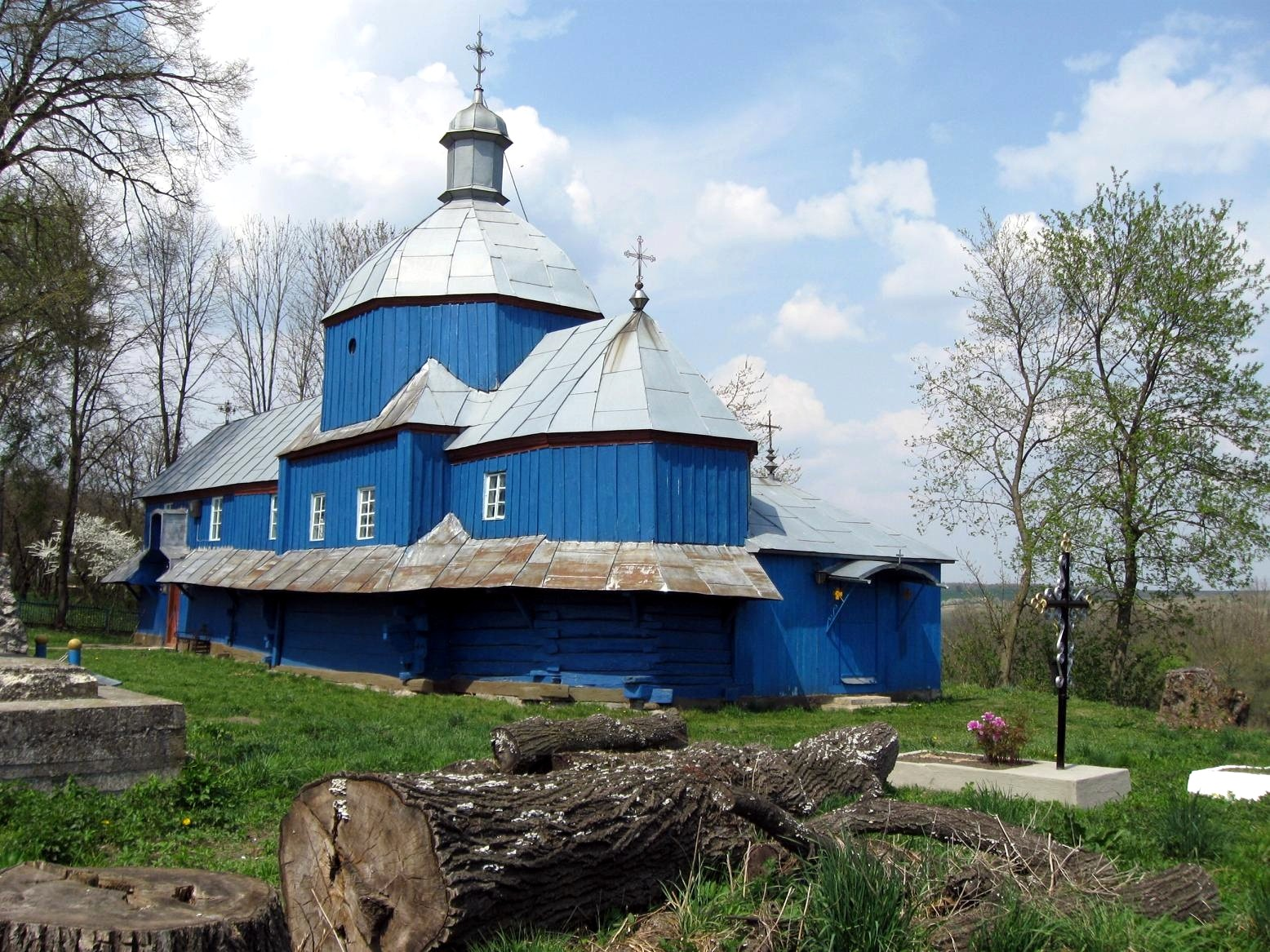
Church of the Ascension of the Lord in Neterpyntsi

Neterpyntsi (Ukrainian: Нетерпинці) is a village in Zaliztsi settlement hromada, Ternopil Raion, Ternopil Oblast, Ukraine.

== History ==
The first written account of the village was in 1649.

After the liquidation of the Zboriv Raion on 19 July 2020, the village became part of the Ternopil Raion.

== Religion ==
- Church of the Resurrection (1877, wooden).

== Sources ==
- (in Ukrainian) Балицька О., Карачик М., Нетерпинці // Ternopil Encyclopedic Dictionary: in 4 v. / editorial board: H. Yavorskyi and other, Ternopil: "Zbruch", 2005, V. 2: К—О, 706 s. — ISBN 966-528-199-2.
- "Neterpińce". Geographical Dictionary of the Kingdom of Poland (in Polish). 6. Warszawa: Kasa im. Józefa Mianowskiego. 1885. p. 960.
