= Blikh =

Rural locality in Ternopil Oblast, Ukraine

Blikh Бліх
- Location in Ternopil Oblast
- Coordinates: 49°48′3″N 25°25′35″E
- Country: Ukraine
- Oblast: Ternopil Oblast
- Raion: Ternopil Raion
- Hromada: Zaliztsi settlement hromada
- Time zone: UTC+2 (EET)
  - Summer (DST): UTC+3 (EEST)
- Postal code: 47234

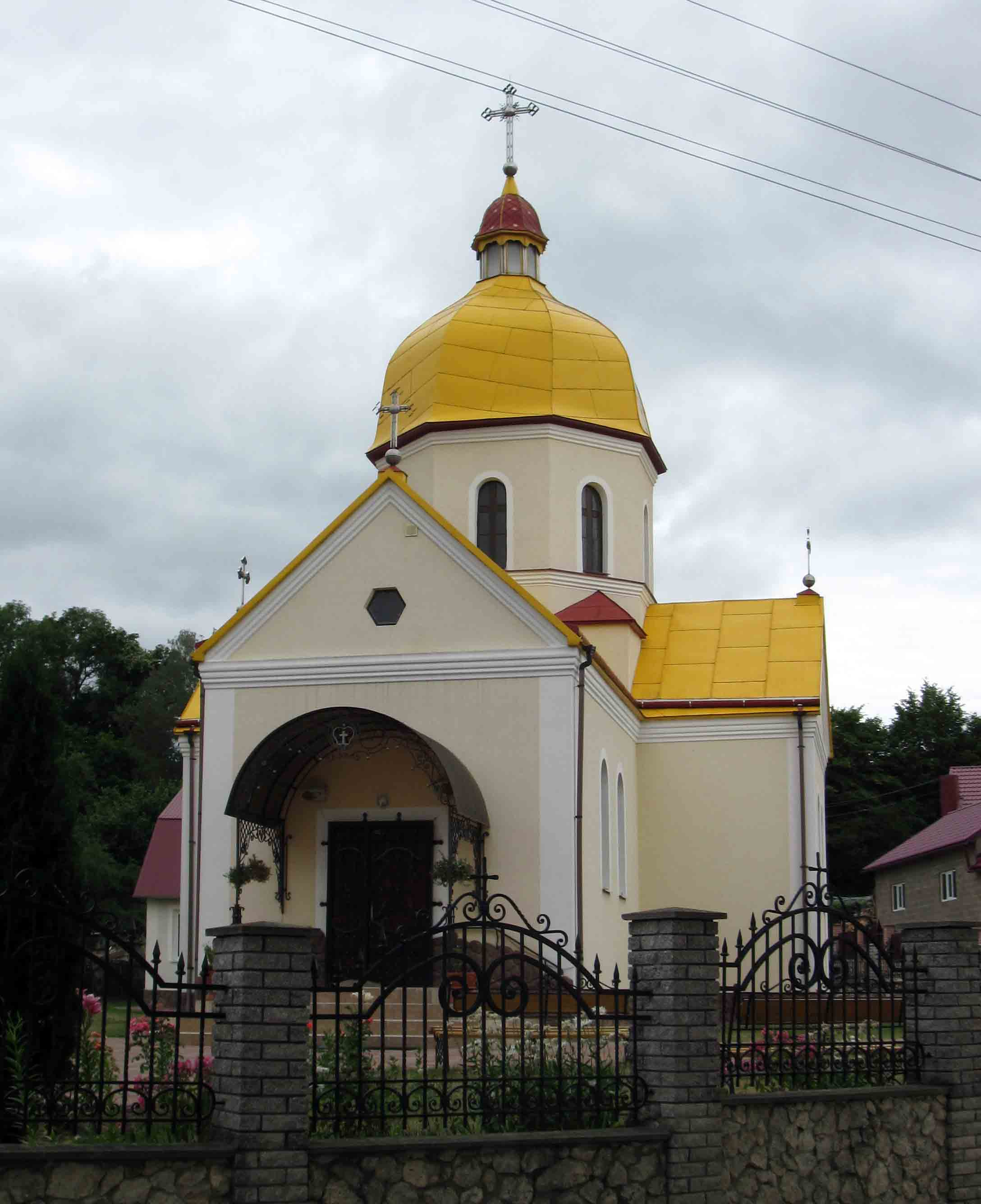
Church of St. Apostles Peter and Paul (2006) in Blikh, Zboriv district, Ternopil region

Blikh (Ukrainian: Бліх) is a village in Zaliztsi settlement hromada, Ternopil Raion, Ternopil Oblast, Ukraine.

== History ==
The first written mention of the village was in 18th century.

After the liquidation of the Zboriv Raion on 19 July 2020, the village became part of the Ternopil Raion.

== Religion ==
- Saints Peter and Paul church (2006).

== Sources ==
- (in Ukrainian) В. Уніят, В. Ханас., Бліх // Ternopil Encyclopedic Dictionary: in 4 v. / editorial board: H. Yavorskyi and other, Ternopil: "Zbruch", 2004, V. 1: А—Й, S. 144. — ISBN 966-528-197-6.
