= Ratyshchi =

Rural locality in Ternopil Oblast, Ukraine

Ratyshchi Ратищі
- Village
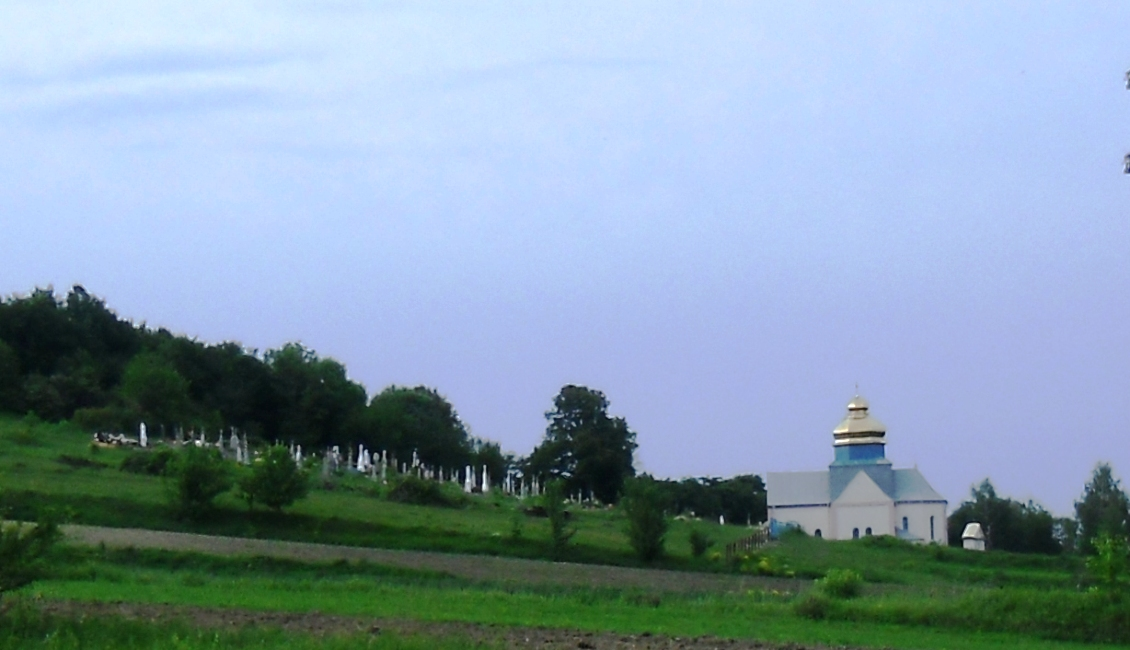
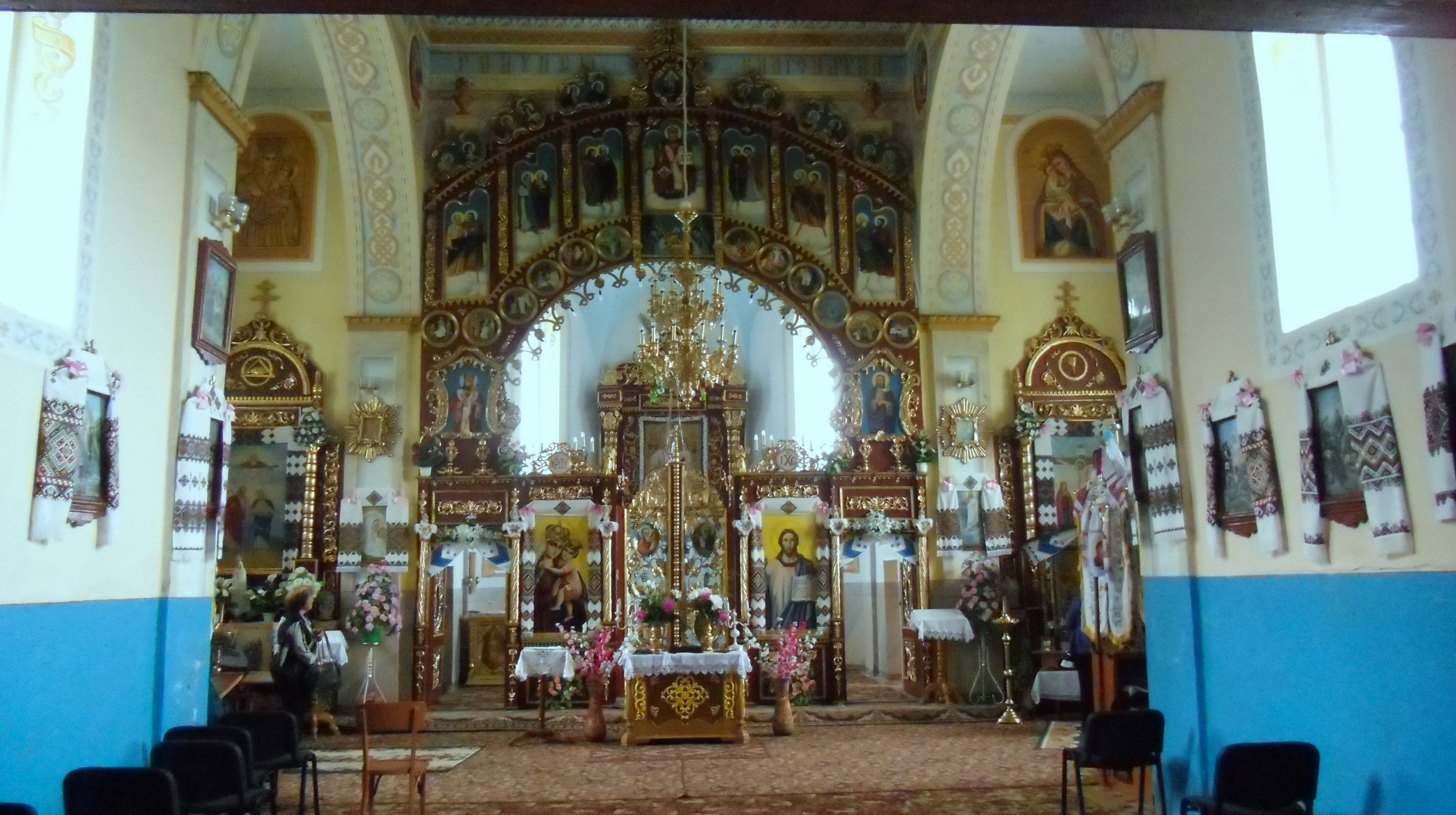
- From Upper left: (1) Holy Dormition temple in the village Ratyshchi; (2) Inside interior Holy Dormition church in the village Ratyshchi.

- Location within Ternopil Oblast
- Coordinates: 49°50′07″N 25°18′31″E
- Country: Ukraine
- Oblast: Ternopil Oblast
- District: Ternopil Raion

Area
  - Total: 0.87 km^{2} (0.34 sq mi)
- Elevation: 318 m (1,043 ft)

Population
  - Total: 311
  - Density: 362.07/km^{2} (937.8/sq mi)
- Time zone: UTC+2 (EET)
  - Summer (DST): UTC+3 (EEST)
- Website: село Ратищі (in Ukrainian)

Ratyshchi (Ukrainian: Ра́тищі; Polish: Ratyszcze) is a village (selo) in Ternopil Raion, Ternopil Oblast (province in western Ukraine). It belongs to Zaliztsi settlement hromada, one of the hromadas of Ukraine.

Local government – Ratyshchivska village council. Unto her is subordinated to the village Pishchane. The village is situated on the banks of the Seret River which is the left tributary of the Dniester.

Village Ratyshchi distant from the administrative center of Ternopil 45 kilometres (28 mi), from Zboriv — 32 kilometres (20 mi), and from Lviv — 102 kilometres (63 mi).

The first written record dates from the 12th century.

Until 18 July 2020, Ratyshchi belonged to Zboriv Raion. The raion was abolished in July 2020 as part of the administrative reform of Ukraine, which reduced the number of raions of Ternopil Oblast to three. The area of Zboriv Raion was merged into Ternopil Raion.

== Literature ==
- Ukrainian: Історія міст і сіл УРСР : Тернопільська область. – К. : ГРУРЕ, 1973 р. – 640 с.
