= Peschany, Altai Krai =

Peschany Песчаный
- Settlement
- Location within Altai Krai Location within Russia
- Coordinates: 51°37′N 81°05′E
- Country: Russia
- Region: Altai Krai
- District: Rubtsovsky District
- Time zone: UTC+7:00

Peschany (Russian: Песчаный) is a rural locality (a settlement) in Kuybyshevsky Selsoviet, Rubtsovsky District, Altai Krai, Russia. The population was 4 as of 2013. There are 4 streets.

== Geography ==
Peschany is located 23 km northwest of Rubtsovsk (the district's administrative centre) by road. Peschany Borok is the nearest rural locality.
