= Peschanoye, Astrakhan Oblast =

Peschanoye Песчаное
- Selo
- Location within Astrakhan Oblast Location within Russia
- Coordinates: 45°48′N 47°19′E
- Country: Russia
- Region: Astrakhan Oblast
- District: Limansky District
- Time zone: UTC+4:00

Peschanoye (Russian: Песчаное) is a rural locality (a selo) in Limansky District, Astrakhan Oblast, Russia. The population was 382 as of 2010. There are 4 streets.

== Geography ==
Peschanoye is located 10 km northeast of Liman (the district's administrative centre) by road. Liman is the nearest rural locality.
