= Ihor Prasolov =

Russian-Ukrainian politician (born 1962)

- Ігор Прасолов
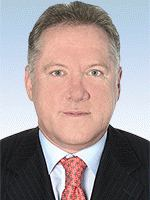

3rd Minister of Economical Development and Trade
- In office 24 December 2012 – 27 February 2014
- Prime Minister: Mykola Azarov
- Preceded by: Petro Poroshenko
- Succeeded by: Pavlo Sheremeta

Personal details
- Born: 4 February 1960 (age 66) Peschany, Murmansk Oblast, Russia
- Party: Party of Regions

Ihor Mykolayovych Prasolov (Ukrainian: Ігор Миколайович Прасолов; born 4 February 1962) is a Russian-born Ukrainian politician. He served as a Minister of Economical Development and Trade of Ukraine from 24 December 2012 till 27 February 2014.

== Biography ==
Prasolov was born on 4 February 1962 in Peschany, Murmansk Oblast, Russia.

=== Education ===
- 1982 – 1987 – Rostov State University named after Mikhail Suslov, majoring in political economics, graduated with qualification of economist, lecturer of political economics.
- 1990 – 1993 – Donetsk State University, postgraduate studies.

=== Career ===
- 1979–1980 – electrical fitter trainee, electrical fitter at Novocherkassk power plant
- 1980–1982 – military service in Soviet Army, was discharged with the rank of staff sergeant
- 1987–1993 – Assistant Professor of Political Economy department at Donetsk State University
- 1993–2000 – General Director of CJSC Investment Company "Keramet Invest"
- 2000–2005 – General Director of JSC System Capital Management

=== Politics ===
- 2006 – 2007 – People's Deputy of Ukraine of the 5th Verkhovna Rada, was elected from the Party of Regions, No. 43 on the list
- November 2007 – elected as People's Deputy of the 6th Verkhovna Rada, from the Party of Regions, No. 43 on the list
- Chairman of the Subcommittee on Securities and Stock Market, Committee of the Verkhovna Rada of Ukraine on Finance, Banking, Tax and Customs Policy
- Member of the Group for Interparliamentary Relations with Russian Federation
- Member of the Group for Interparliamentary Relations with the Republic of Belarus
- Member of the Group for Interparliamentary Relations with the Czech Republic

== Family ==
- spouse Natalia Prasolova (b. 1961) is administrative director of Pershe Dzherelo (eng.- First Source) company
- daughter Christina Prasolova, born 28 September 1989
- son Dmitry Prasolov, born 27 July 1999.

== See also ==
- 2007 Ukrainian parliamentary election
- List of Ukrainian Parliament Members 2007
