= Złota Góra =

Złota Góra may refer to the following places:

- Złota Góra, Łódź Voivodeship (central Poland)
- Złota Góra, Ostrołęka County in Masovian Voivodeship (east-central Poland)
- Złota Góra, Chojnice County in Pomeranian Voivodeship (north Poland)
- Złota Góra, Kartuzy County in Pomeranian Voivodeship (north Poland)
