= Pishchane, Ternopil Oblast =

Rural locality in Ternopil Oblast, Ukraine

Pishchane Піщане
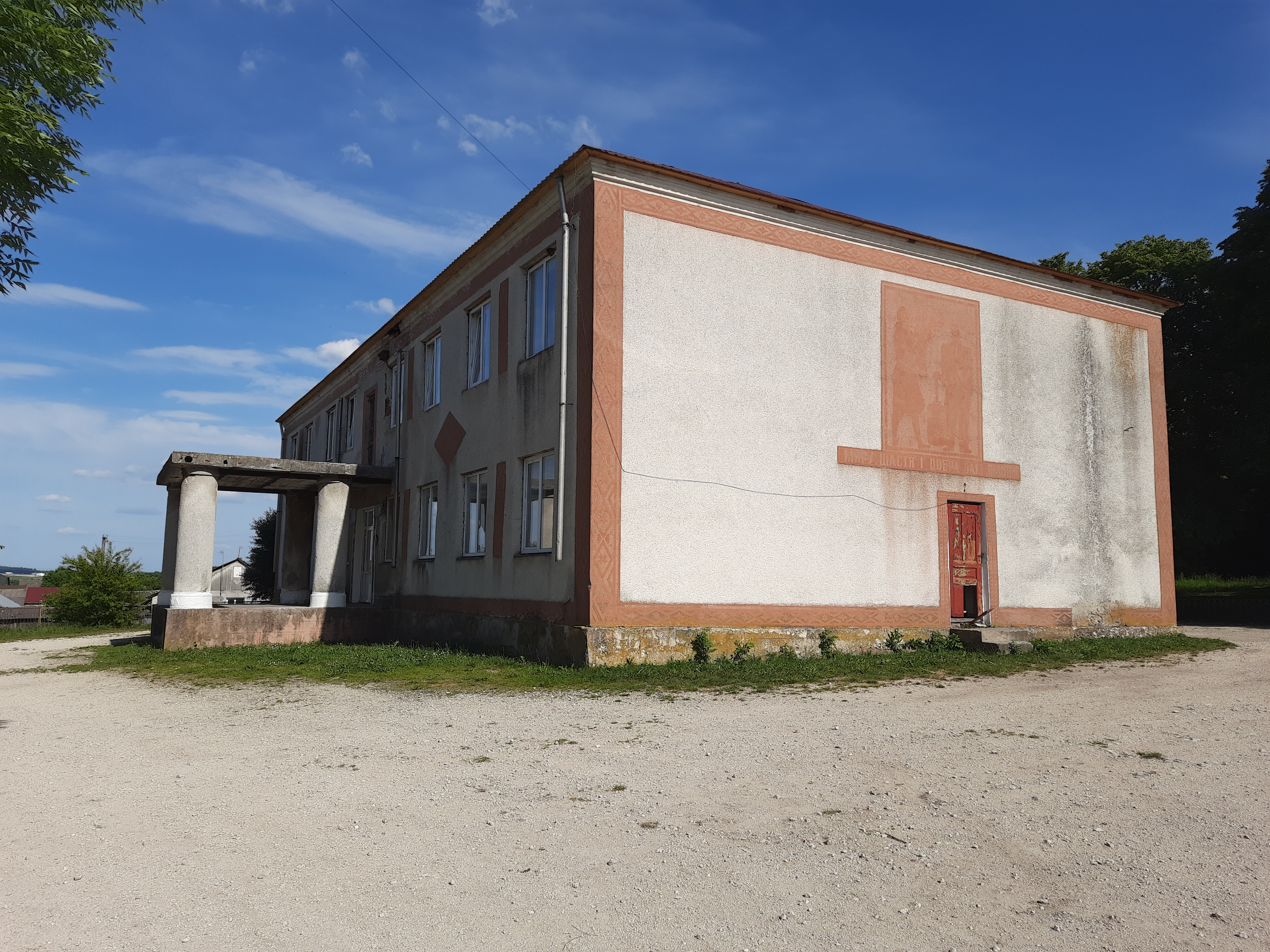

- Location in Ternopil Oblast
- Coordinates: 49°49′34″N 25°15′49″E
- Country: Ukraine
- Oblast: Ternopil Oblast
- Raion: Ternopil Raion
- Hromada: Zaliztsi settlement hromada
- Time zone: UTC+2 (EET)
  - Summer (DST): UTC+3 (EEST)
- Postal code: 47220

Pishchane (Ukrainian: Піщане; until 1964, Hnydava) is a village in Zaliztsi settlement hromada, Ternopil Raion, Ternopil Oblast, Ukraine.

== History ==
The first written mention of the village was in 1532.

After the liquidation of the Zboriv Raion on 19 July 2020, the village became part of the Ternopil Raion.

== Religion ==
- Saint Michael's church (1928, brick),
- Saints Peter and Paul church (1936, rebuilt from a Roman Catholic church in 1995).

== Sources ==
- (in Ukrainian) Гуцал П., Пугач З., Уніят В., Піщане // Ternopil Encyclopedic Dictionary: in 4 v. / editorial board: H. Yavorskyi and other, Ternopil: "Zbruch", 2008, V. 3: П—Я, S. 92. — ISBN 978-966-528-279-2.
- "Hnidawa". Geographical Dictionary of the Kingdom of Poland (in Polish). 3. Warszawa: Kasa im. Józefa Mianowskiego. 1882. p. 80.
