= Peschany, Serafimovichsky District, Volgograd Oblast =

Peschany Песчаный
- Khutor
- Location within Volgograd Oblast Location within Russia
- Coordinates: 49°15′N 42°22′E
- Country: Russia
- Region: Volgograd Oblast
- District: Serafimovichsky District
- Time zone: UTC+4:00

Peschany (Russian: Песчаный) is a rural locality (a khutor) and the administrative center of Peschanovskoye Rural Settlement, Serafimovichsky District, Volgograd Oblast, Russia. The population was 616 as of 2010.

== Geography ==
Peschany is located 67 km southwest of Serafimovich (the district's administrative centre) by road. Posyolok otdeleniya 3 sovkhoza Ust-Medveditsky is the nearest rural locality.
