= Zaliztsi =

Rural locality in Ternopil Oblast, Ukraine

Zaliztsi Залізці
- Rural settlement
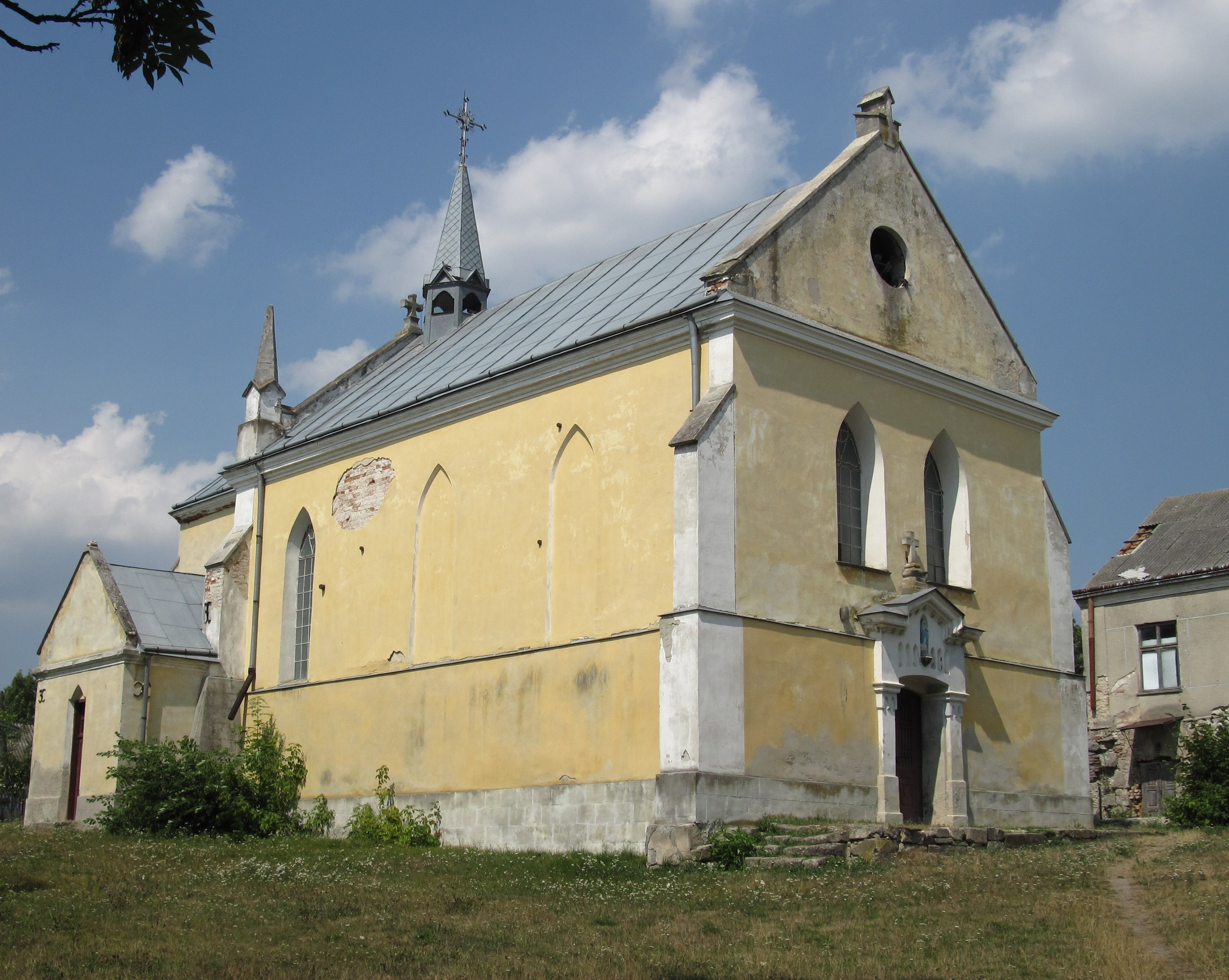

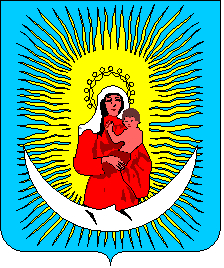
- Coat of arms

- Location of Zaliztsi in Ternopil Oblast Location of Zaliztsi in Ukraine
- Coordinates: 49°47′42″N 25°22′46″E
- Country: Ukraine
- Oblast: Ternopil Oblast
- Raion: Ternopil Raion
- Founded: 1483
- Town status: 1961

Government
  - Town Head: Andriy Noga

Area
  - Total: 4.4 km^{2} (1.7 sq mi)
- Elevation: 331 m (1,086 ft)

Population (2022)
  - Total: 2,498
  - Density: 570/km^{2} (1,500/sq mi)
- Time zone: UTC+2 (EET)
  - Summer (DST): UTC+3 (EEST)
- Postal code: 47234
- Area code: +380 3540
- Website: http://rada.gov.ua/

Zaliztsi (Ukrainian: Залізці; Polish: Załoźce; Yiddish: זאַלאָזשיץ, romanized: Zalozhitz), previously known as Zalozhtsi (Ukrainian: Заложці) until 1993, is a rural settlement in Ternopil Raion, Ternopil Oblast, western Ukraine. It hosts the administration of Zaliztsi settlement hromada, one of the hromadas of Ukraine. Population: 2,498 (2022 estimate).

== History ==
Zaliztsi was first founded in 1483; the settlement was granted Magdeburg rights in 1520, and it acquired the status of an urban-type settlement in 1961.

Until 18 July 2020, Zaliztsi belonged to Zboriv Raion, which was then abolished in the administrative reform of Ukraine. This reduced the number of raions of Ternopil Oblast to three, the area of Zboriv Raion being merged into Ternopil Raion. On 26 January 2024, a new law entered into force which abolished the urban-type settlement status, and Zaliztsi became a rural settlement.

== Monuments ==
- Zaliztsi Castle

== Notable residents ==
- Yaroslava Muzyka (1894–1973), Ukrainian painter, restorer, and public figure
