= Strusiv =

Strusiv Струсів
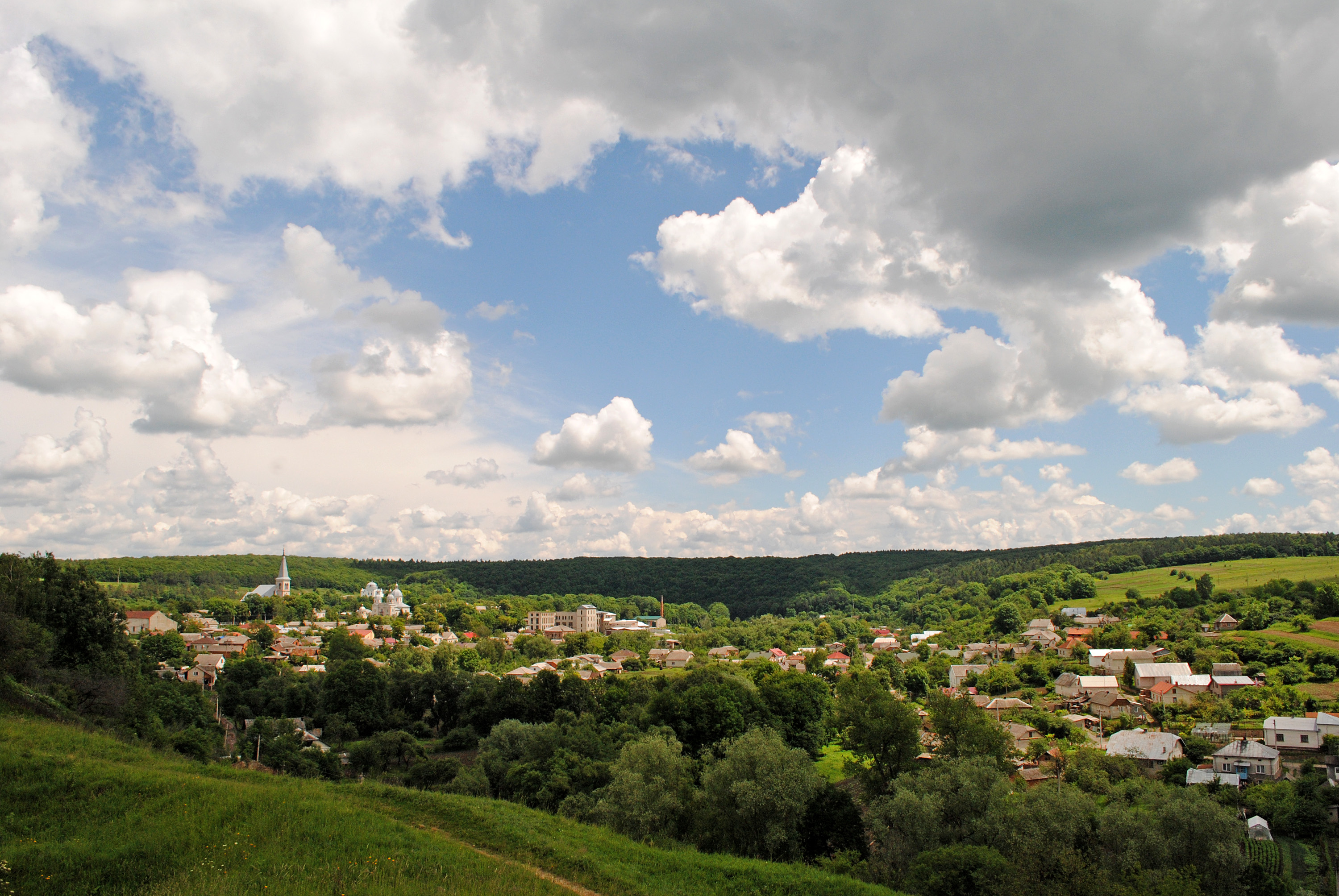

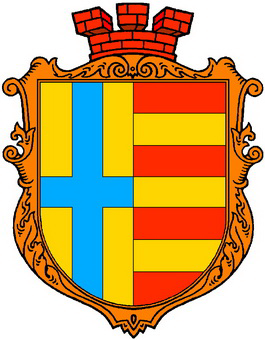
- Flag Coat of arms

- Location within Ternopil Oblast Location within Ukraine
- Coordinates: 49°20′20″N 25°37′00″E
- Country: Ukraine
- Oblast: Ternopil Oblast
- Raion: Ternopil Raion

Area
  - Total: 3.526 km^{2} (1.361 sq mi)

Population (2007 Census)
  - Total: 1,465
- Time zone: UTC+2 (EET)
  - Summer (DST): UTC+3 (EEST)
- Postal code: 48127
- Area code: +380 3551

Strusiv (Ukrainian: Струсів; Polish: Strusów; Yiddish: סטריסעוו, romanized: Strisev) is a small village located in Ternopil Raion of Ternopil Oblast in western Ukraine.

== History ==
Strusiv was founded in 1434. In the first half of the 17th century, the village was owned by the Strus family of the Korczak coat of arms, including Mikołaj Struś, commander of the Polish troops in the Moscow Kremlin.

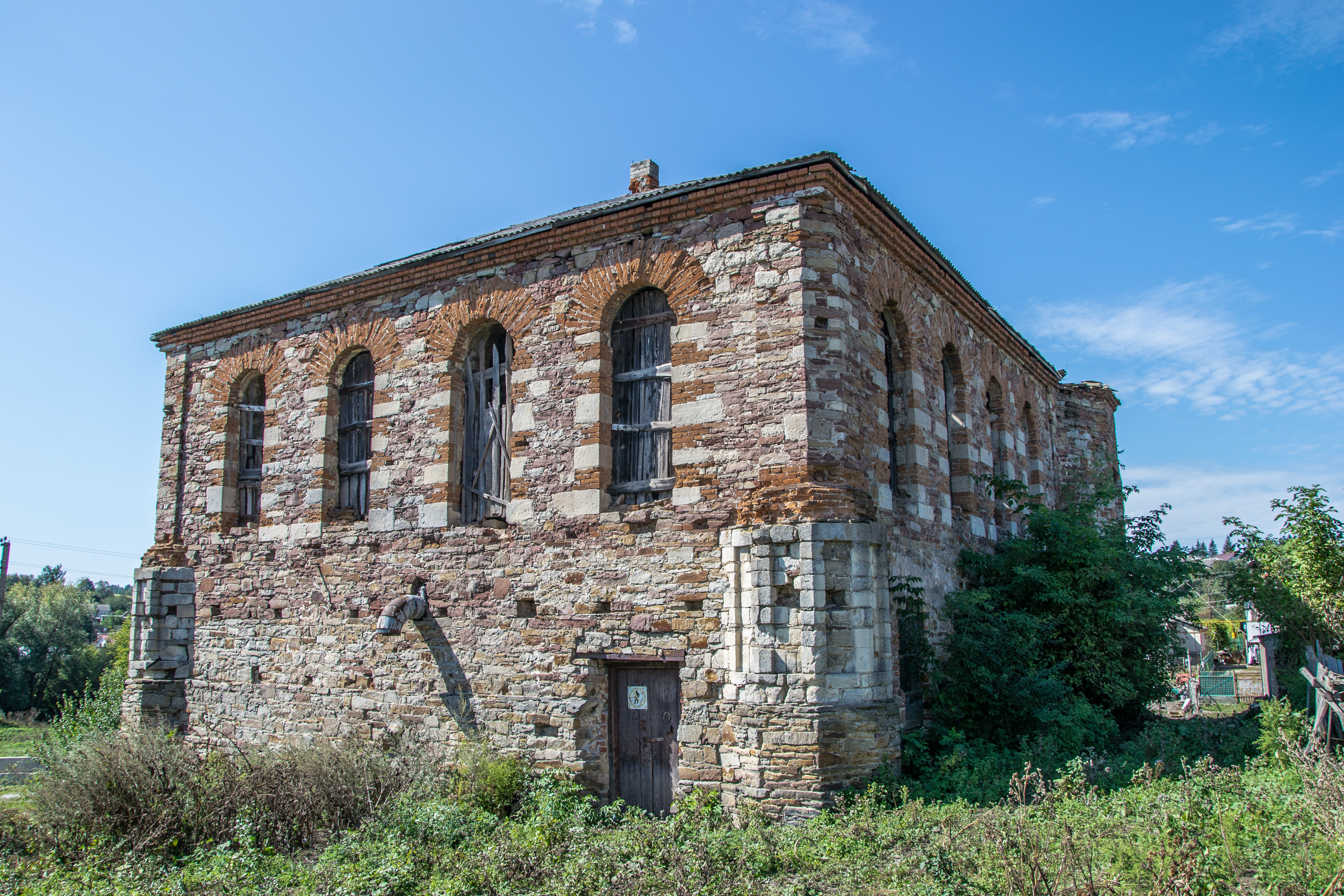
Synagogue. An architectural monument of local importance (XIX century).

During the Second Republic of Poland, Strusiv was the seat of the rural commune of Strusów in the Trembowelski poviat in the Tarnopol Voivodeship. In 1921, it had 2,412 inhabitants.

In the village there is a monument to Stepan Bandera, built in 2009 at the initiative of Ukrainian local authorities.

Until 18 July 2020, Strusiv belonged to Terebovlia Raion. The raion was abolished in July 2020 as part of the administrative reform of Ukraine, which reduced the number of raions in Ternopil Oblast to three. The area of Terebovlia Raion was merged into Ternopil Raion.

== Monuments ==
- Strusiv Castle
- Strusiv Monastery
