= Peschanaya (river) =

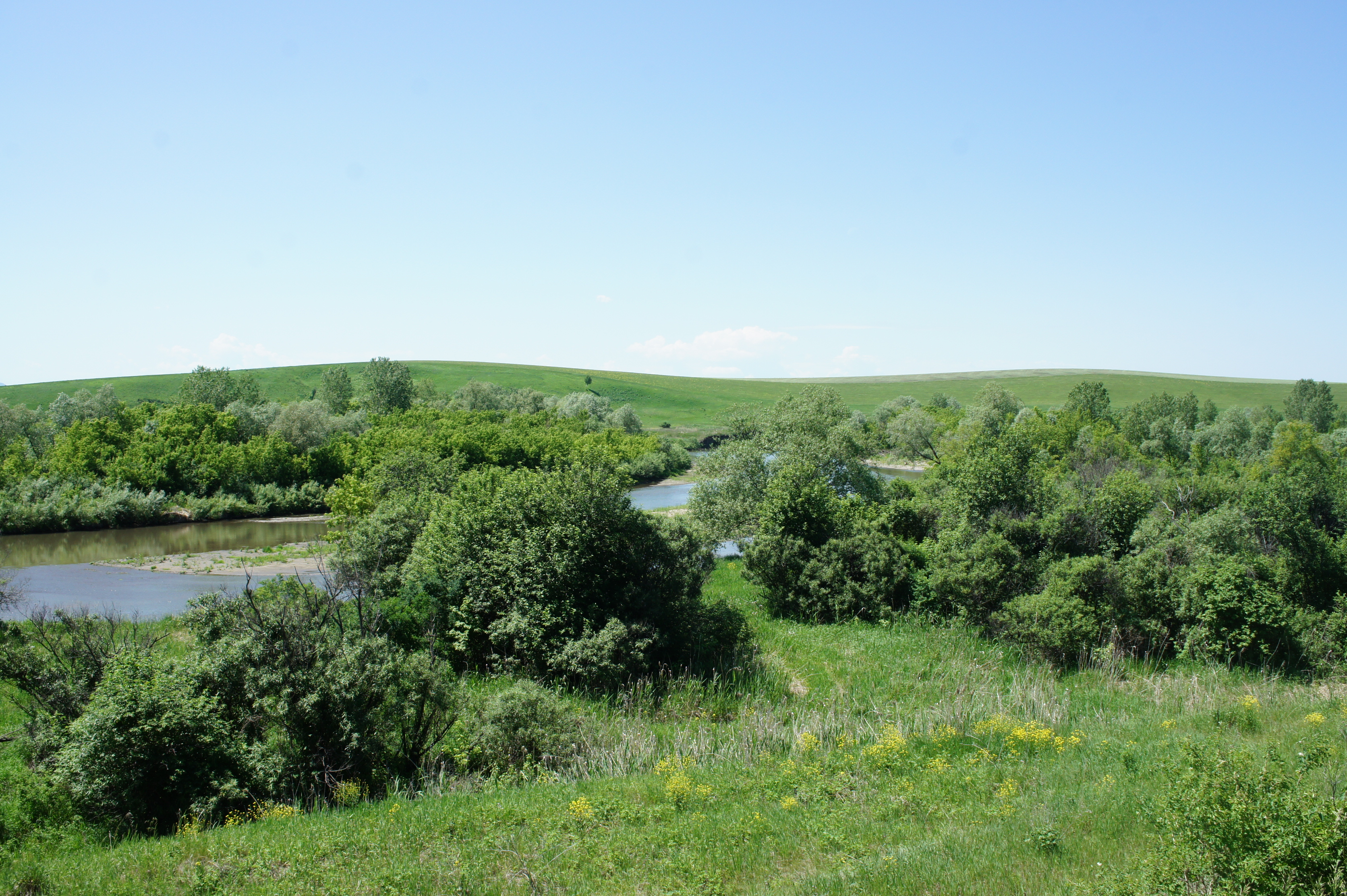

Location
- Country: Russia

Physical characteristics
- Mouth: Ob
  - coordinates: 52°25′15″N 84°49′49″E
- Length: 276 km (171 mi)
- Basin size: 5,660 km^{2} (2,190 sq mi)

Basin features
- Progression: Ob→ Kara Sea

The Peschanaya (Russian: Песчаная) is a left tributary of the Ob. It flows through Altai Krai and Altai Republic in Siberia.

== Geography ==
It originates approximately 25 kilometers south-east of the village of Besh-Ozek on the slopes Seminsky Range at an altitude of about 1700 m. It joins the Ob 13 km below the confluence of the Biya and Katun. It is 276 kilometres (171 mi) long, and has a drainage basin of 5,660 square kilometres (2,190 sq mi).
