= Peschanaya, Irkutsk Oblast =

Peschanaya Песчаная
- Village
- Location within Russia
- Coordinates: 53°17′08″N 107°36′08″E
- Country: Russia
- Federal subject: Irkutsk Region
- Administrative district: Olkhonsky District
- Municipal unit: Khuzirskiy
- Time zone: UTC+08 (IRKT)
- Postal code: 666137

Peschanaya (Russian: Песч́аная) is a village in the Olkhonsky District of Irkutsk region of Russia, a part of the Khuzhirskiy municipal unit. Located in the bay Nurganskaya Guba in the middle part of the western coast of Olkhon Island, in 12 km northeast from the village Kharantsy.

In the late 1930s near the village a correctional labor camp was established for those convicted of hooliganism and larceny. The camp was a part of the GULAG system, the barracks were fenced with barbed wire. The prisoners worked on fishing boats, at the fish factory and a sawmill.

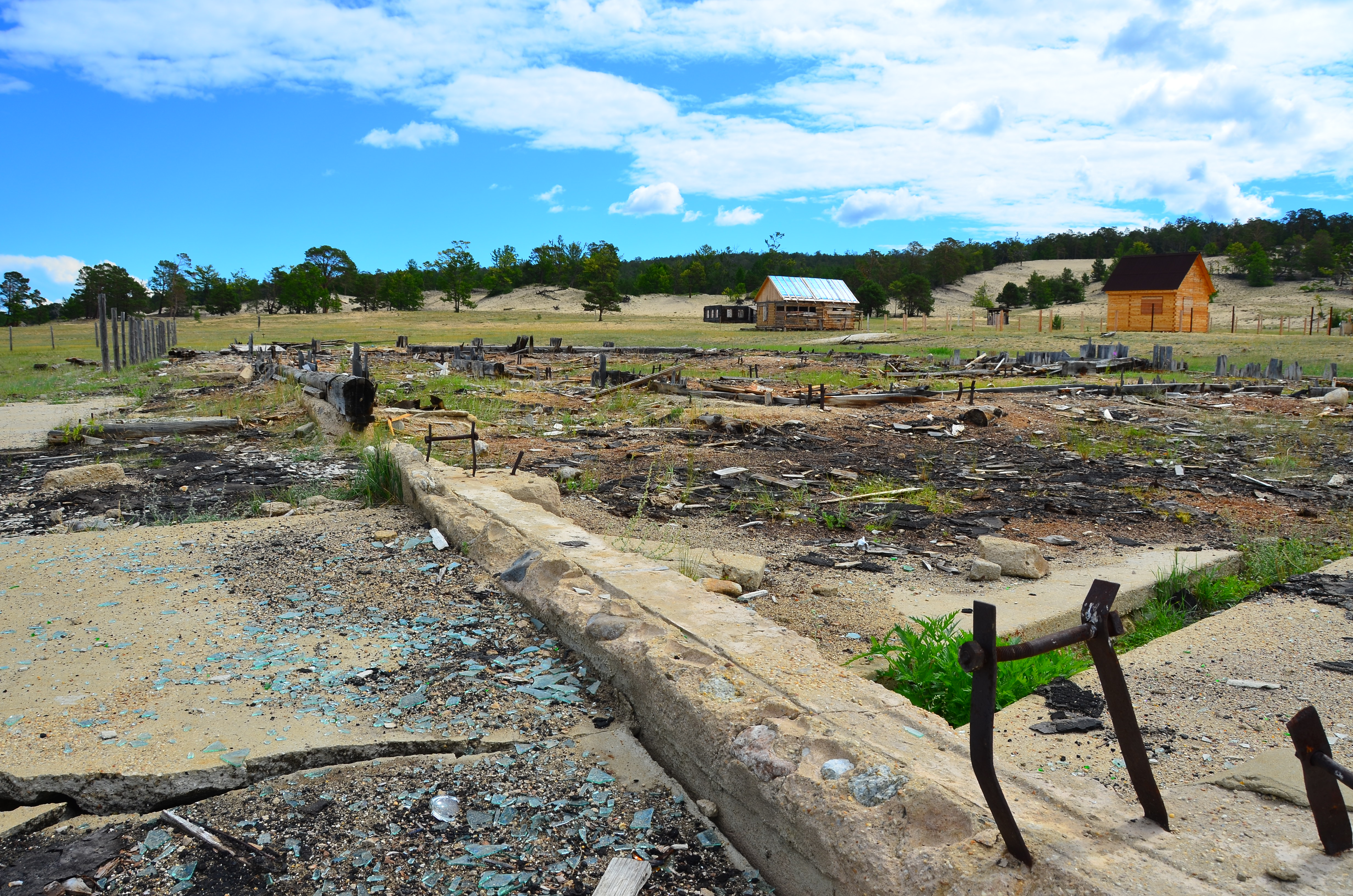
The ruins of Peschany labour camp as seen in 2014

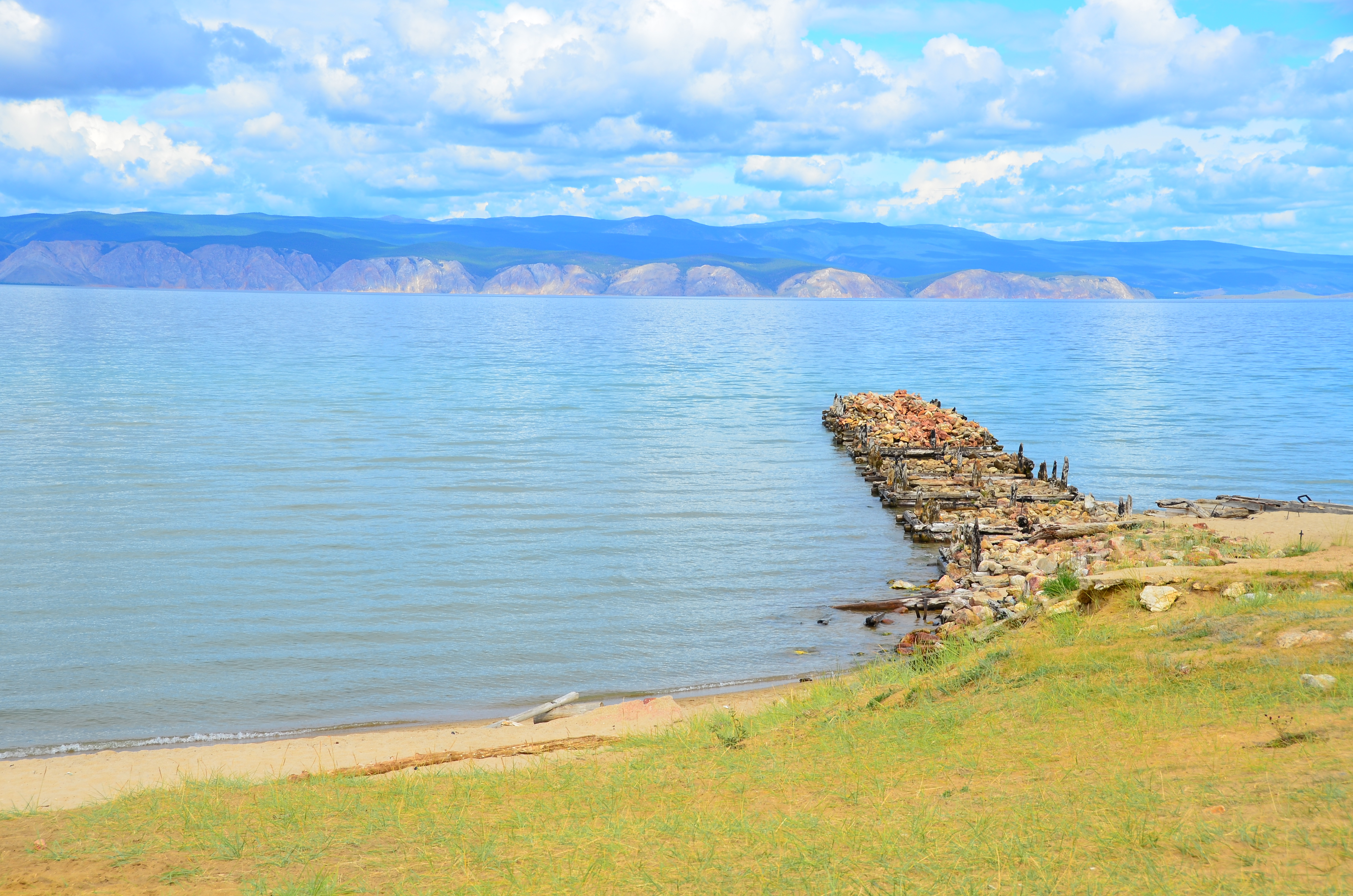
The ruins of the pier at Peschany labour camp, Olkhon Island, with the mainland opposite, as seen in 2014
