= Peschany, Murmansk Oblast =

Peschany Песчаный
- Posyolok
- Interactive map of Peschany
- Location of Peschany Peschany (Murmansk Oblast)
- Coordinates: 68°30′52″N 33°11′14″E
- Country: Russia
- Federal subject: Murmansk Oblast
- Administrative district: Kolsky District

Population (2010 Census)
  - Total: 139
  - Estimate (2021): 49 (−64.7%)
- Time zone: UTC+3 (MSK)
- Postal code: 184331
- Dialing code: +7 81553
- OKTMO ID: 47605404111

Peschany (Russian: Песчаный) is a rural locality (a Posyolok) in Kolsky District of Murmansk Oblast, Russia. The village is located beyond the Arctic Circle, on the Kola Peninsula. It is the birthplace of Igor Prasolov, a former Ukrainian Minister of Economic Development and Trade.
