= Seret (river) =

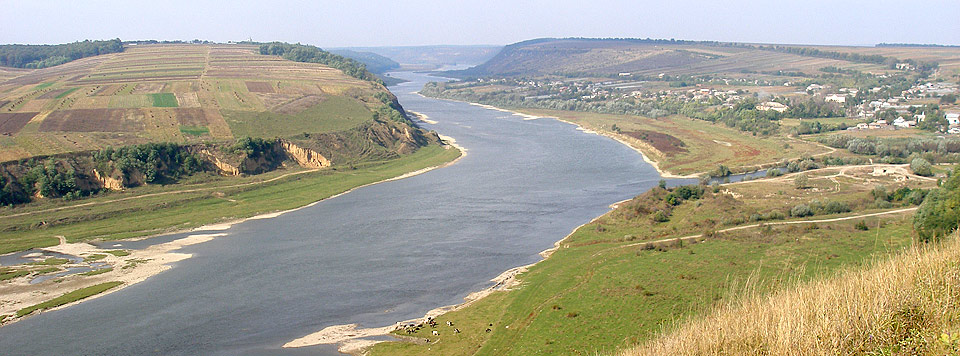
- At the confluence of the Seret and the Dniester

Location
- Country: Ukraine

Physical characteristics
- Mouth: Dniester
  - coordinates: 48.62°N 25.8569°E
- Length: 248 km (154 mi)
- Basin size: 3,900 km^{2} (1,500 sq mi)

Basin features
- Progression: Dniester→ Dniester Estuary→ Black Sea

The Seret (Ukrainian: Серет) is the left tributary of the Dniester that flows through the Ternopil Oblast of Ukraine. It is 248 kilometres (154 mi) long and its basin area is 3,900 square kilometres (1,506 sq mi). The towns of Ternopil, Terebovlia and Chortkiv sit along the river's banks. Some of the bloodiest fighting of World War I took place on the banks of the Seret.

== Location ==
It consists of the merger of several small rivers near the village of Ratyshchi district. Seretha hills are located between the hills of Voroniaky, the middle current - within the Ternopil plateau, the lower reaches - in the Dniester canyon area. The main direction of the current is from north to south (partly to the southeast).

== Usage ==
The river is used for technical water supply, agricultural needs, fish breeding, and recreation. There are also a few archaeological sites, monuments, and hydroelectric power stations along the river.

== Tributaries ==
- Right: Hrabarka, Seret-Pravyi, Smolianka, Lopushanka, Nesterivka, Dovzhanka, Bridok, Nishla, Hnyla Rudka, Pereima, Bila, Cherkaska, Tupa
- Left: Mlynka, Huk, Hnizna (the largest tributary), Khromova
