= Mlynivtsi, Ternopil Raion, Ternopil Oblast =

Rural locality in Ternopil Oblast, Ukraine

Mlynivtsi Млинівці
- Location in Ternopil Oblast
- Coordinates: 49°41′42″N 25°8′4″E
- Country: Ukraine
- Oblast: Ternopil Oblast
- Raion: Ternopil Raion
- Hromada: Zboriv urban hromada
- Time zone: UTC+2 (EET)
  - Summer (DST): UTC+3 (EEST)
- Postal code: 47242

Mlynivtsi (Ukrainian: Млинівці) is a village in the Zboriv urban hromada of the Ternopil Raion of Ternopil Oblast in Ukraine.

== History ==
The first written mention of the village was in 1482.

After the liquidation of the Zboriv Raion on 19 July 2020, the village became part of the Ternopil Raion.

== Religion ==
- Saint Mykola Charnetskyi church (2010).

== Sources ==
- (in Ukrainian) Медведик П., Млинівці // Ternopil Encyclopedic Dictionary: in 4 v. / editorial board: H. Yavorskyi and other, Ternopil: "Zbruch", 2005, V. 2: К—О, S. 540. — ISBN 966-528-199-2.
- "Młynowce (3) z Grabkowcami, s. 548". Geographical Dictionary of the Kingdom of Poland (in Polish). 6. Warszawa: Kasa im. Józefa Mianowskiego. 1885. p. 548.
