= Zhukivtsi, Ternopil Raion, Ternopil Oblast =

Rural locality in Ternopil Oblast, Ukraine

Zhukivtsi Жуківці
- Location in Ternopil Oblast
- Coordinates: 49°41′45″N 25°14′0″E
- Country: Ukraine
- Oblast: Ternopil Oblast
- Raion: Ternopil Raion
- Hromada: Zboriv urban hromada
- Time zone: UTC+2 (EET)
  - Summer (DST): UTC+3 (EEST)
- Postal code: 47261

Zhukivtsi (Ukrainian: Жуківці) is a village in the Zboriv urban hromada of the Ternopil Raion of Ternopil Oblast in Ukraine.

== History ==
The first written mention of the village was in 1598.

After the liquidation of the Zboriv Raion on 19 July 2020, the village became part of the Ternopil Raion.

== Religion ==
- Saint Paraskeva church (1908; brick).

== Sources ==
- (in Ukrainian) Медведик П., Жуківці // Ternopil Encyclopedic Dictionary: in 4 v. / editorial board: H. Yavorskyi and other, Ternopil: "Zbruch", 2004, V. 1: А—Й, 696 s. — ISBN 966-528-197-6.
- "Żukowce, przysiółek Mszany w powiecie złoczowskim". Geographical Dictionary of the Kingdom of Poland (in Polish). 14. Warszawa: Kasa im. Józefa Mianowskiego. 1895. p. 846.
