= Hodiv =

Rural locality in Ternopil Oblast, Ukraine

Hodiv Годів
- Location in Ternopil Oblast
- Coordinates: 49°36′52″N 25°1′53″E
- Country: Ukraine
- Oblast: Ternopil Oblast
- Raion: Ternopil Raion
- Hromada: Zboriv urban hromada
- Time zone: UTC+2 (EET)
  - Summer (DST): UTC+3 (EEST)
- Postal code: 47272

Hodiv (Ukrainian: Годів) is a village in the Zboriv urban hromada of the Ternopil Raion of Ternopil Oblast in Ukraine.

== History ==
The first written mention of the village was in 1439.

In 1694, the Battle of Hodów took place, where Polish forces fortified the village and defended it against the Tatars of Budjak Horde.

After the liquidation of the Zboriv Raion on 19 July 2020, the village became part of the Ternopil Raion.

== Religion ==
- St. Michael church (1928; wooden).

== Notable residents ==
The paternal lineage of Markiian Shashkevych comes from Hodiv.

== Sources ==
- (in Ukrainian) Медведик П., Уніят В., Годів // Ternopil Encyclopedic Dictionary: in 4 v. / editorial board: H. Yavorskyi and other, Ternopil: "Zbruch", 2004, V. 1: А—Й, S. 376. — ISBN 966-528-197-6.
- "Hodów". Geographical Dictionary of the Kingdom of Poland (in Polish). 3. Warszawa: Kasa im. Józefa Mianowskiego. 1882. p. 87–88.
