= Mshana, Ternopil Oblast =

Rural locality in Ternopil Oblast, Ukraine

Mshana Мшана
- Location in Ternopil Oblast
- Coordinates: 49°41′2″N 25°15′0″E
- Country: Ukraine
- Oblast: Ternopil Oblast
- Raion: Ternopil Raion
- Hromada: Zboriv urban hromada
- Time zone: UTC+2 (EET)
  - Summer (DST): UTC+3 (EEST)
- Postal code: 47261

Mshana (Ukrainian: Мшана) is a village in the Zboriv urban hromada of the Ternopil Raion of Ternopil Oblast in Ukraine.

== History ==
The first written mention of the village was in 1593.

After the liquidation of the Zboriv Raion on 19 July 2020, the village became part of the Ternopil Raion.

== Religion ==
- St. George church (1906, brick).

== Notable residents ==
The village was visited by Metropolitan Andrei Sheptytskyi of the UGCC.

== Sources ==
- (in Ukrainian) Гошко Г., Медведик П., Мшана // Ternopil Encyclopedic Dictionary: in 4 v. / editorial board: H. Yavorskyi and other, Ternopil: "Zbruch", 2005, V. 2: К—О, S. 583. — ISBN 966-528-199-2.
- "Mszana 2.) M. z Żukowcami, wś, pow. złoczowski". Geographical Dictionary of the Kingdom of Poland (in Polish). 6. Warszawa: Kasa im. Józefa Mianowskiego. 1885. p. 782—783.
