= Jarosławice =

Jarosławice may refer to the following places:

- Jarosławice, Lower Silesian Voivodeship (south-west Poland)
- Jarosławice, Świętokrzyskie Voivodeship (south-central Poland)
- Jarosławice, Masovian Voivodeship (east-central Poland)
- Yaroslavychi, Ternopil Oblast in Ukraine, formerly known as Jarosławice

== See also ==
- Battle of Jaroslawice
