= Krasna, Ternopil Oblast =

Rural locality in Ternopil Oblast, Ukraine

Krasna Красна
- Location in Ternopil Oblast
- Coordinates: 49°36′43″N 25°10′3″E
- Country: Ukraine
- Oblast: Ternopil Oblast
- Raion: Ternopil Raion
- Hromada: Zboriv urban hromada
- Time zone: UTC+2 (EET)
  - Summer (DST): UTC+3 (EEST)
- Postal code: 47204

Krasna (Ukrainian: Красна) is a village in the Zboriv urban hromada of the Ternopil Raion of Ternopil Oblast in Ukraine.

== History ==
The first written mention of the village was in 1441.

After the liquidation of the Zboriv Raion on 19 July 2020, the village became part of the Ternopil Raion.

== Religion ==
- Saints Cosmas and Demian church (1841, wooden).

== Sources ==
- (in Ukrainian) Медведик П., Красне // Ternopil Encyclopedic Dictionary: in 4 v. / editorial board: H. Yavorskyi and other, Ternopil: "Zbruch", 2005, V. 2: К—О, S. 2018–219. — ISBN 966-528-199-2.
- "Krasna (pow. brzeżański)". Geographical Dictionary of the Kingdom of Poland (in Polish). 4. Warszawa: Kasa im. Józefa Mianowskiego. 1883. p. 621.
