= Monylivka =

Rural locality in Ternopil Oblast, Ukraine

Monylivka Монилівка
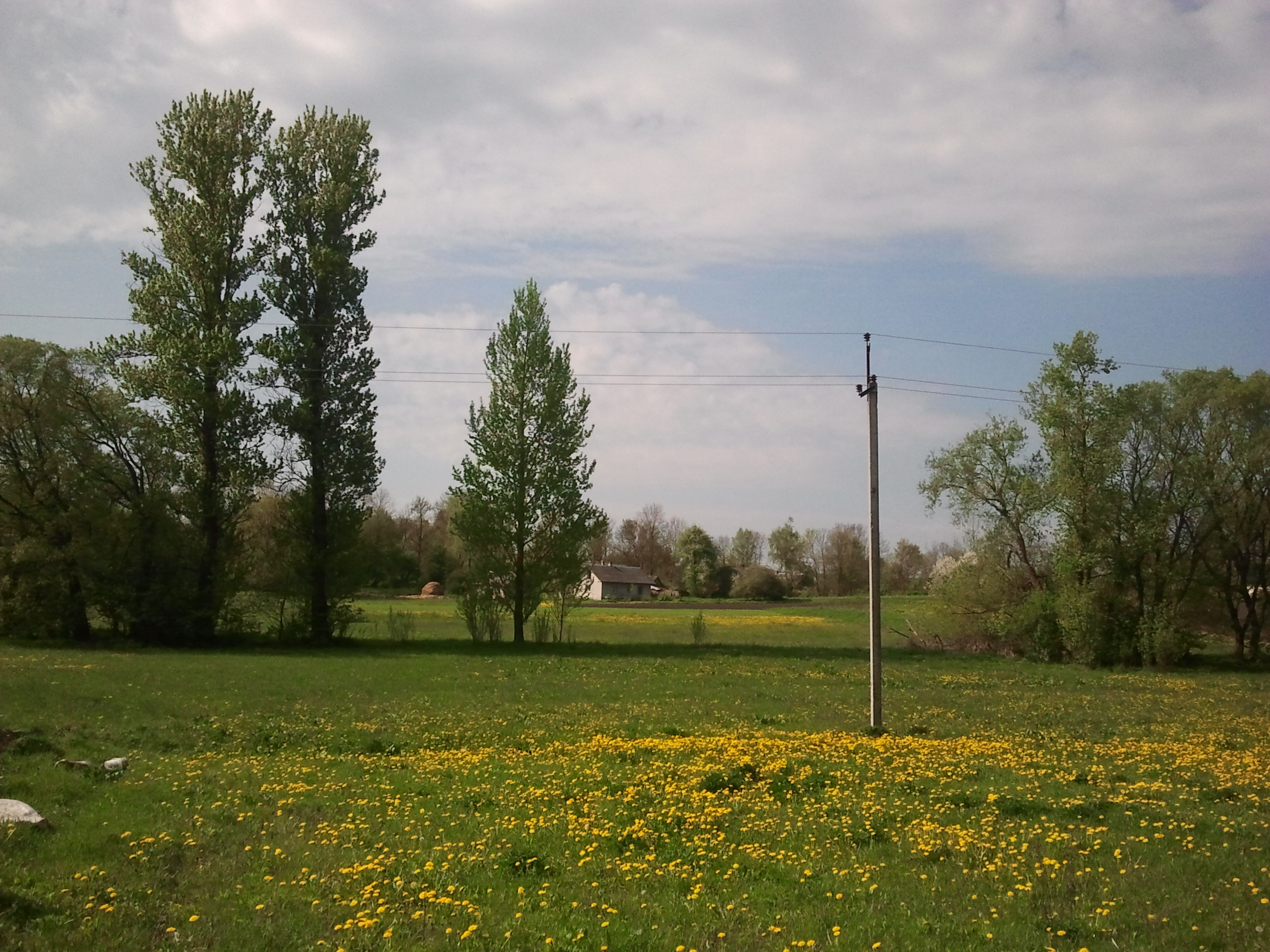

- Location in Ternopil Oblast
- Coordinates: 49°43′59″N 25°11′50″E
- Country: Ukraine
- Oblast: Ternopil Oblast
- Raion: Ternopil Raion
- Hromada: Zboriv urban hromada
- Time zone: UTC+2 (EET)
  - Summer (DST): UTC+3 (EEST)
- Postal code: 47227

Monylivka (Ukrainian: Монилівка) is a village in the Zboriv urban hromada of the Ternopil Raion of Ternopil Oblast in Ukraine.

== History ==
The first written mention of the village was in 1532.

After the liquidation of the Zboriv Raion on 19 July 2020, the village became part of the Ternopil Raion.

== Religion ==
- St. Michael church (1927, brick).

== Sources ==
- (in Ukrainian) Лашта В., Монилівка // Ternopil Encyclopedic Dictionary: in 4 v. / editorial board: H. Yavorskyi and other, Ternopil: "Zbruch", 2005, V. 2: К—О, S. 560. — ISBN 966-528-199-2.
- "Moniłówka". Geographical Dictionary of the Kingdom of Poland (in Polish). 6. Warszawa: Kasa im. Józefa Mianowskiego. 1885. p. 661.
