= Tsytsory =

Rural locality in Ternopil Oblast, Ukraine

Tsytsory Цицори
- Location in Ternopil Oblast
- Coordinates: 49°35′57″N 25°16′22″E
- Country: Ukraine
- Oblast: Ternopil Oblast
- Raion: Ternopil Raion
- Hromada: Zboriv urban hromada
- Time zone: UTC+2 (EET)
  - Summer (DST): UTC+3 (EEST)
- Postal code: 47620

Tsytsory (Ukrainian: Цицори) is a village in the Zboriv urban hromada of the Ternopil Raion of Ternopil Oblast in Ukraine.

== History ==
One of the references to the village in archival documents dates back to the late 18th century.

After the liquidation of the Zboriv Raion on 19 July 2020, the village became part of the Ternopil Raion.

== Religion ==
- Holy Trinity church (1996, brick).

== Sources ==
- (in Ukrainian) Уніят В., Цицори // Ternopil Encyclopedic Dictionary: in 4 v. / editorial board: H. Yavorskyi and other, Ternopil: "Zbruch", 2008, V. 3: П—Я, S. 575. — ISBN 978-966-528-279-2.
- "Cecory, paraf. gr. kat. Płaucza". Geographical Dictionary of the Kingdom of Poland (in Polish). 1. Warszawa: Kasa im. Józefa Mianowskiego. 1880. p. 529.
