= Khrabuzna =

Rural locality in Ternopil Oblast, Ukraine

Khrabuzna Храбузна
- Location in Ternopil Oblast
- Coordinates: 49°40′13″N 25°1′21″E
- Country: Ukraine
- Oblast: Ternopil Oblast
- Raion: Ternopil Raion
- Hromada: Zboriv urban hromada
- Time zone: UTC+2 (EET)
  - Summer (DST): UTC+3 (EEST)
- Postal code: 47241

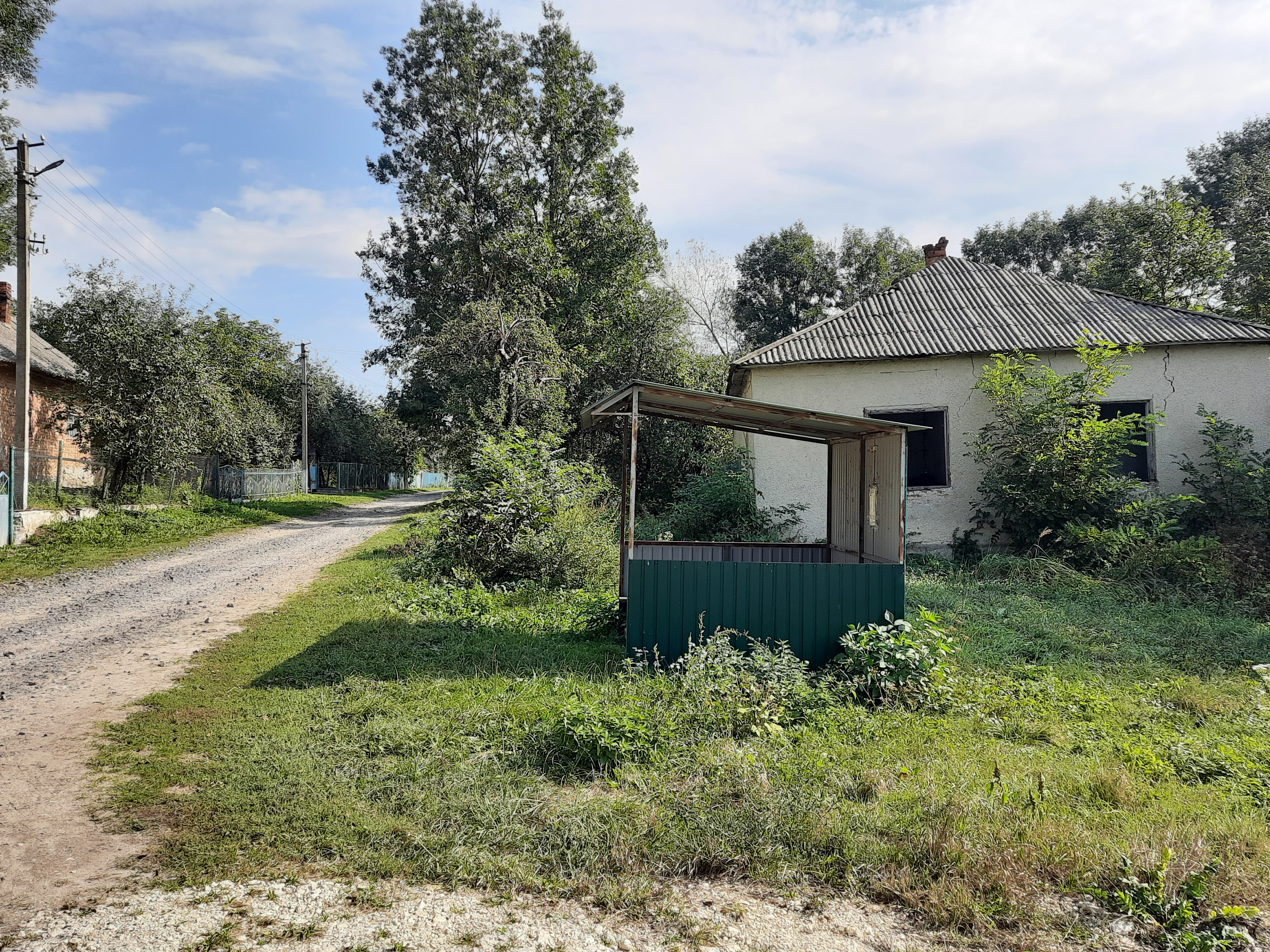
Bus stop in Khrabuzna

Khrabuzna (Ukrainian: Храбузна) is a village in the Zboriv urban hromada of the Ternopil Raion of Ternopil Oblast in Ukraine.

== History ==
The first written mention of the village was in 1765.

After the liquidation of the Zboriv Raion on 19 July 2020, the village became part of the Ternopil Raion.

== Religion ==
- Church of the Presentation of the Blessed Virgin Mary (1991, brick).

== Sources ==
- (in Ukrainian) Мельничук Б., Панас Л., Храбузна // Ternopil Encyclopedic Dictionary: in 4 v. / editorial board: H. Yavorskyi and other, Ternopil: "Zbruch", 2008, V. 3: П—Я, S. 562. — ISBN 978-966-528-279-2.
- "Chrabużna, ob. Hrabużna". Geographical Dictionary of the Kingdom of Poland (in Polish). 1. Warszawa: Kasa im. Józefa Mianowskiego. 1880. p. 641.
- "Hrabużna, przys. Urłowa". Geographical Dictionary of the Kingdom of Poland (in Polish). 1. Warszawa: Kasa im. Józefa Mianowskiego. 1880. p. 172.
