= Vilshanka, Ternopil Oblast =

Rural locality in Ternopil Oblast, Ukraine

Vilshanka Вільшанка
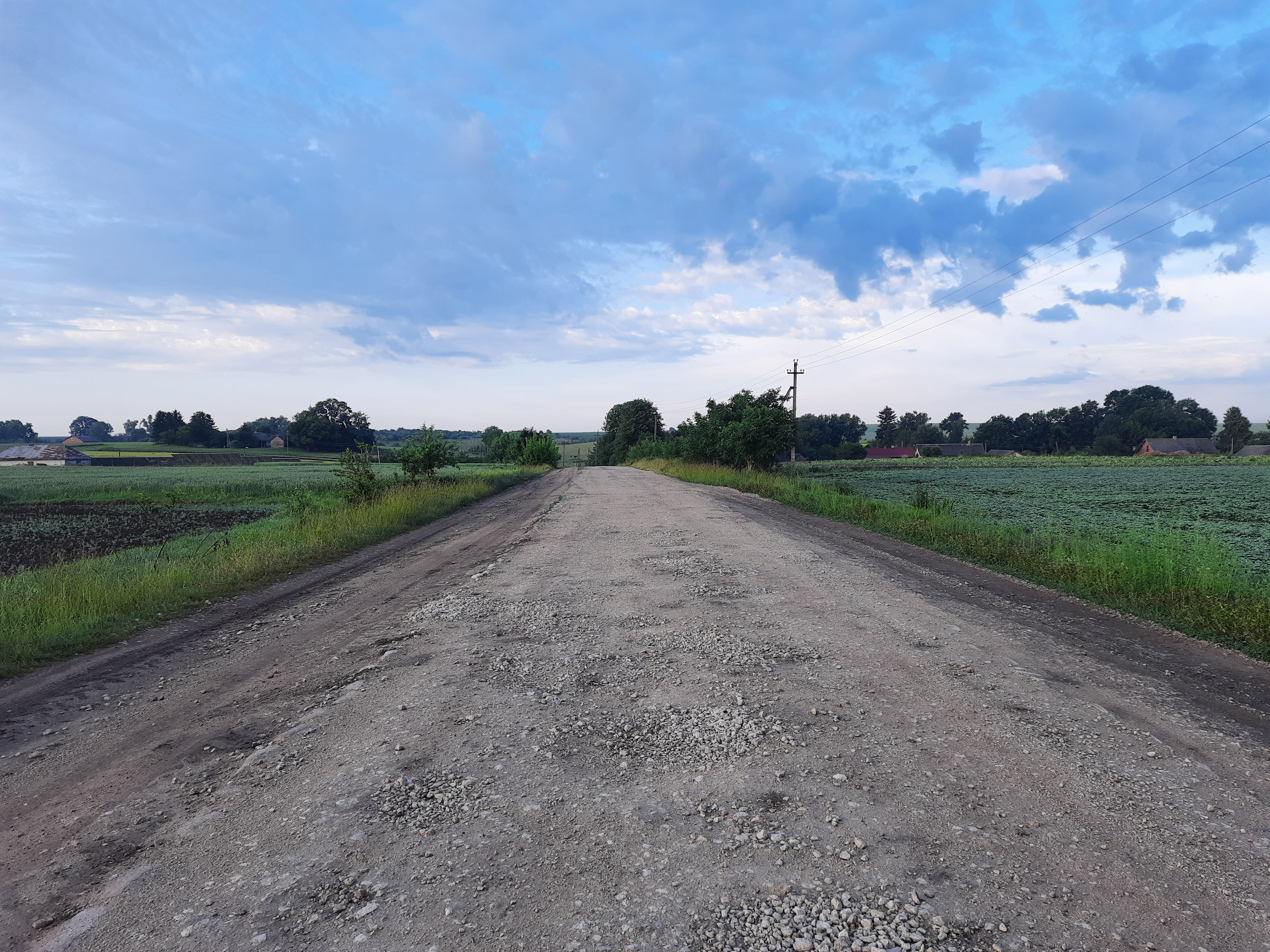
- Road to the village

- Location in Ternopil Oblast
- Coordinates: 49°35′33″N 25°13′19″E
- Country: Ukraine
- Oblast: Ternopil Oblast
- Raion: Ternopil Raion
- Hromada: Zboriv urban hromada
- Time zone: UTC+2 (EET)
  - Summer (DST): UTC+3 (EEST)
- Postal code: 47620

Vilshanka (Ukrainian: Вільшанка) is a village in the Zboriv urban hromada of the Ternopil Raion of Ternopil Oblast in Ukraine.

== History ==
The first written mention of the village was in 1467.

After the liquidation of the Zboriv Raion on 19 July 2020, the village became part of the Ternopil Raion.

== Religion ==
- Saint Demetrius church (1994, brick).

== Sources ==
- (in Ukrainian) Гуцал П., Коропецька У., Вільшанка // Ternopil Oblast. History of cities and villages: in 3 v. / Ternopil: "Terno-graph", 2014, V. 2: Г—Л, S. 336. — ISBN 978-966-457-228-3.
- "Olszanka 4). Mała, powiat złoczowski, 5 kilometrów od urzędu pocztowego i stacji kolejowej w Krasnem". Geographical Dictionary of the Kingdom of Poland (in Polish). 7. Warszawa: Kasa im. Józefa Mianowskiego. 1886. p. 504.
