= Travotoloky =

Rural locality in Ternopil Oblast, Ukraine

Travotoloky Травотолоки
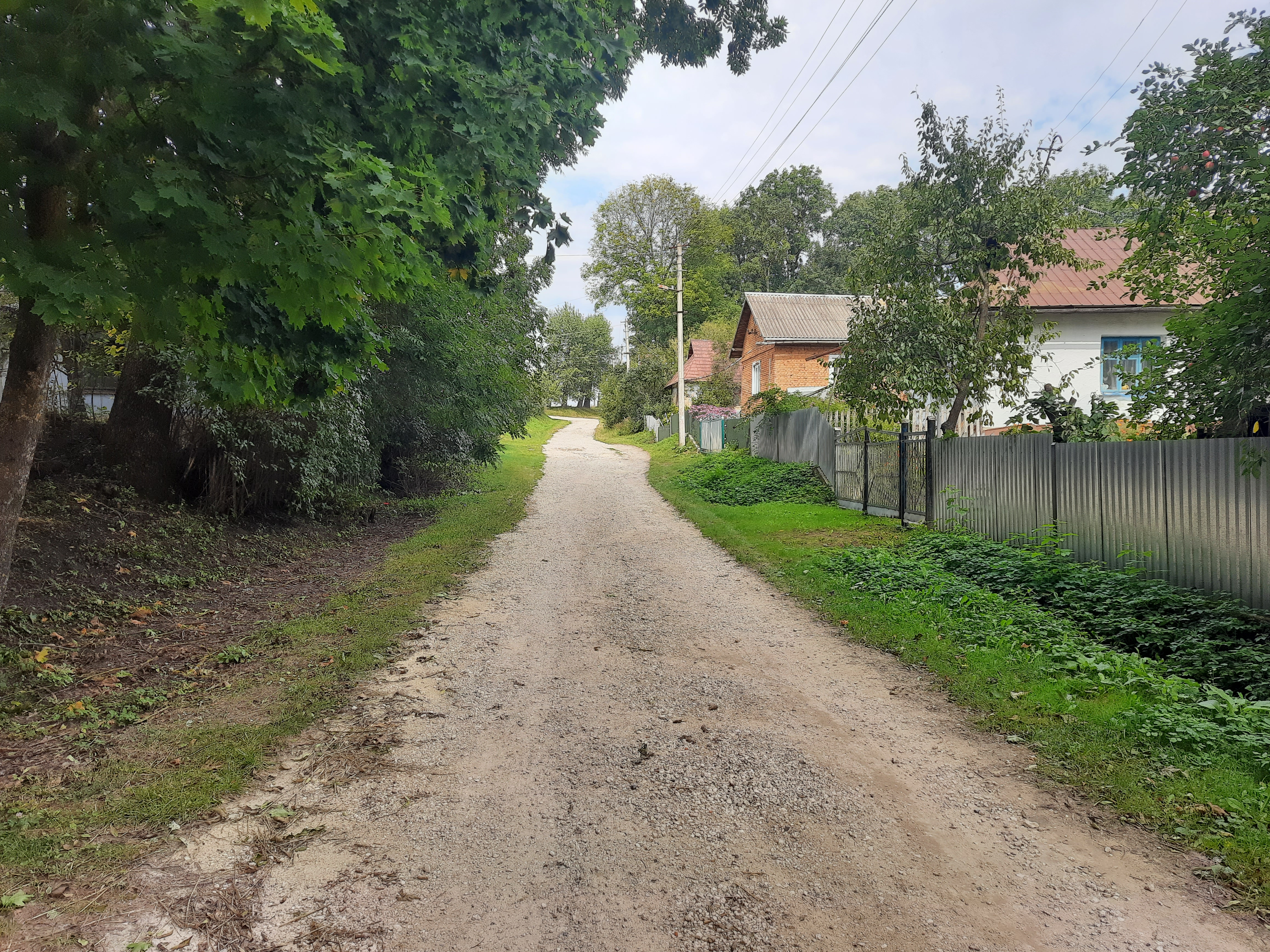
- Village Street Travotoloky Ternopil district, Ternopil region

- Location in Ternopil Oblast
- Coordinates: 49°38′27″N 25°3′13″E
- Country: Ukraine
- Oblast: Ternopil Oblast
- Raion: Ternopil Raion
- Hromada: Zboriv urban hromada
- Time zone: UTC+2 (EET)
  - Summer (DST): UTC+3 (EEST)
- Postal code: 47204

Travotoloky (Ukrainian: Травотолоки) is a village in the Zboriv urban hromada of the Ternopil Raion of Ternopil Oblast in Ukraine.

== History ==
The first written mention of the village was in 1570.

After the liquidation of the Zboriv Raion on 19 July 2020, the village became part of the Ternopil Raion.

== Religion ==
- Church of the Intercession (1909, brick).

== Sources ==
- (in Ukrainian) Ковальков Ю., Уніят В., Травотолоки // Ternopil Encyclopedic Dictionary: in 4 v. / editorial board: H. Yavorskyi and other, Ternopil: "Zbruch", 2008, V. 3: П—Я, S. 464. — ISBN 978-966-528-279-2.
- "Trawotłoki". Geographical Dictionary of the Kingdom of Poland (in Polish). 12. Warszawa: Kasa im. Józefa Mianowskiego. 1892. p. 448.
