= Futory, Ukraine =

Rural locality in Ternopil Oblast, Ukraine

Futory Футори
- Location in Ternopil Oblast
- Coordinates: 49°38′13″N 25°9′2″E
- Country: Ukraine
- Oblast: Ternopil Oblast
- Raion: Ternopil Raion
- Hromada: Zboriv urban hromada
- Time zone: UTC+2 (EET)
  - Summer (DST): UTC+3 (EEST)
- Postal code: 47204

Futory (Ukrainian: Футори) is a village in the Zboriv urban hromada of the Ternopil Raion of Ternopil Oblast in Ukraine.

== History ==
The village has been known from the 18th century.

After the liquidation of the Zboriv Raion on 19 July 2020, the village became part of the Ternopil Raion.

== Religion ==
- Church of the Intercession (1997, brick).

== Sources ==
- (in Ukrainian) Ханас В., Футори // Ternopil Encyclopedic Dictionary: in 4 v. / editorial board: H. Yavorskyi and other, Ternopil: "Zbruch", 2008, V. 3: П—Я, S. 537. — ISBN 978-966-528-279-2.
