= Korchunok, Ternopil Oblast =

Rural locality in Ternopil Oblast, Ukraine

Korchunok Корчунок
- Location in Ternopil Oblast
- Coordinates: 49°47′36″N 25°5′25″E
- Country: Ukraine
- Oblast: Ternopil Oblast
- Raion: Ternopil Raion
- Hromada: Zboriv urban hromada
- Time zone: UTC+2 (EET)
  - Summer (DST): UTC+3 (EEST)
- Postal code: 47224

Korchunok (Ukrainian: Корчунок) is a village in the Zboriv urban hromada of the Ternopil Raion of Ternopil Oblast in Ukraine.

== History ==
Near the village, archaeological sites of the Late Paleolithic period were discovered.

After the liquidation of the Zboriv Raion on 19 July 2020, the village became part of the Ternopil Raion.

== Sources ==
- (in Ukrainian) Лашта В., Корчунок // Ternopil Encyclopedic Dictionary: in 4 v. / editorial board: H. Yavorskyi and other, Ternopil: "Zbruch", 2005, V. 2: К—О, S. 188. — ISBN 966-528-199-2.
