= Ivachiv =

Rural locality in Ternopil Oblast, Ukraine

Coordinates: 49.769°N 25.088°E

Ivachiv (Ukrainian: Івачів; Ukrainian Pronunciation: Iva-ch-eev) is a Ukrainian village located near the city of Ternopil in Ternopil Raion of Ternopil Oblast. It belongs to Zboriv urban hromada, one of the hromadas of Ukraine.

Until 18 July 2020, Ivachiv belonged to Zboriv Raion. The raion was abolished in July 2020 as part of the administrative reform of Ukraine, which reduced the number of raions of Ternopil Oblast to three. The area of Zboriv Raion was merged into Ternopil Raion.
