= Kalynivka, Ternopil Oblast =

Rural locality in Ternopil Oblast, Ukraine

Kalynivka Калинівка
- Location in Ternopil Oblast
- Coordinates: 49°37′41″N 25°8′11″E
- Country: Ukraine
- Oblast: Ternopil Oblast
- Raion: Ternopil Raion
- Hromada: Zboriv urban hromada
- Time zone: UTC+2 (EET)
  - Summer (DST): UTC+3 (EEST)
- Postal code: 47204

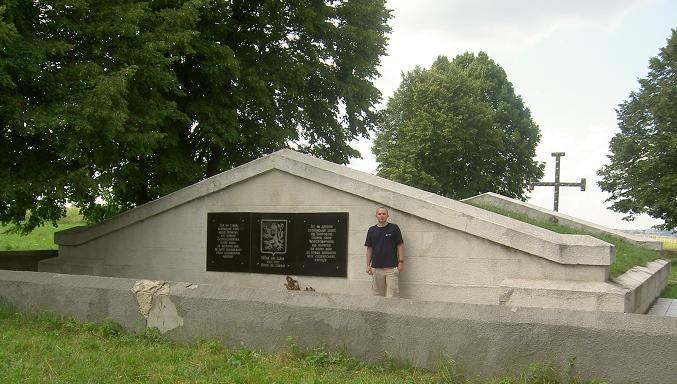
Memorial commemorating Czechoslovak legionaries fallen in the battle of Zborov, located in the village of Kalinivka, Ukraine

Kalynivka (Ukrainian: Калинівка; until 1964, Tsetsova) is a village in the Zboriv urban hromada of the Ternopil Raion of Ternopil Oblast in Ukraine.

== History ==
The first written mention of the village was in 1504.

After the liquidation of the Zboriv Raion on 19 July 2020, the village became part of the Ternopil Raion.

== Religion ==
- Church of the Intercession (1927, wooden).

== Sources ==
- (in Ukrainian) Мельничук Б., Уніят В., Калинівка // Ternopil Encyclopedic Dictionary: in 4 v. / editorial board: H. Yavorskyi and other, Ternopil: "Zbruch", 2005, V. 2: К—О, S. 16. — ISBN 966-528-199-2.
- "Cecowa (z przys. i folw. Cecówka), wieś, pow. złoczowski". Geographical Dictionary of the Kingdom of Poland (in Polish). 1. Warszawa: Kasa im. Józefa Mianowskiego. 1880. p. 529.
