= Harbuziv =

Rural locality in Ternopil Oblast, Ukraine

Harbuziv Гарбузів
- Village
- Location within Ternopil Oblast
- Coordinates: 49°47′50″N 25°11′58″E
- Country: Ukraine
- Oblast: Ternopil Oblast
- District: Ternopil Raion
- Established: 1483

Area
  - Total: 2.060 km^{2} (0.795 sq mi)
- Elevation: 345 m (1,132 ft)

Population
  - Total: 303
  - Density: 147.09/km^{2} (381.0/sq mi)
- Time zone: UTC+2 (EET)
  - Summer (DST): UTC+3 (EEST)
- Postal code: 47221
- Area code: +380 3540
- Website: село Гарбузів (in Ukrainian)

Harbuziv (Ukrainian: Гарбу́зів, Polish: Harbuzów) is a village (selo) in Ternopil Raion of Ternopil Oblast (province of Western Ukraine). It belongs to Zboriv urban hromada, one of the hromadas of Ukraine. The population of the village is about 303 people and Local government is administered by Harbuzivska village council.

== Geography ==
The village is located in the upper reaches of the Seret-Pravyy River (left tributary of the Dniester). It is situated in the 61 kilometres (38 mi) from the regional center Ternopil, 24 kilometres (15 mi) from the district center Zboriv and 111 kilometres (69 mi) from Lviv.

== History and Attractions ==
The date of establishment the village is considered 1483, but the first record on the village dates back to 1232 year.

Until 18 July 2020, Harbuziv belonged to Zboriv Raion. The raion was abolished in July 2020 as part of the administrative reform of Ukraine, which reduced the number of raions of Ternopil Oblast to three. The area of Zboriv Raion was merged into Ternopil Raion.

Archeological sights of ancient culture early Iron Age has been discovered near the village Harbuziv.

In the village there is a church of St. Nicholas. And in the village has been preserved botanical nature monument an ancient linden tree " Harbuzivska lypa ".

== Literature ==
- Ukrainian: Історія міст і сіл УРСР : Тернопільська область. – К. : ГРУРЕ, 1973 р. – 640 с.
