= Yarchivtsi =

Rural locality in Ternopil Oblast, Ukraine

Yarchivtsi Ярчівці
- Location in Ternopil Oblast
- Coordinates: 49°39′30″N 25°12′59″E
- Country: Ukraine
- Oblast: Ternopil Oblast
- Raion: Ternopil Raion
- Hromada: Zboriv urban hromada
- Time zone: UTC+2 (EET)
  - Summer (DST): UTC+3 (EEST)
- Postal code: 47261

Yarchivtsi (Ukrainian: Ярчівці) is a village in the Zboriv urban hromada of the Ternopil Raion of Ternopil Oblast in Ukraine.

== History ==
The village has been known from the 17th century.

After the liquidation of the Zboriv Raion on 19 July 2020, the village became part of the Ternopil Raion.

== Religion ==
- Saint Paraskeva church (1990, brick).

== Notable residents ==
- Hryhorii Barvinskyi (1802–1880), Ukrainian priest, ethnographer, cultural and public figure

The Polish artist Juliusz Kossak was visiting the village.

== Sources ==
- (in Ukrainian) Мельничук Б., Уніят В., Ярчівці // Ternopil Encyclopedic Dictionary: in 4 v. / editorial board: H. Yavorskyi and other, Ternopil: "Zbruch", 2008, V. 3: П—Я, S. 694. — ISBN 978-966-528-279-2.
- "Jarczowce". Geographical Dictionary of the Kingdom of Poland (in Polish). 3. Warszawa: Kasa im. Józefa Mianowskiego. 1882. p. 448.
