= Plisniany =

Rural locality in Ternopil Oblast, Ukraine

Plisniany Плісняни
- Location in Ternopil Oblast
- Coordinates: 49°42′14″N 25°1′55″E
- Country: Ukraine
- Oblast: Ternopil Oblast
- Raion: Ternopil Raion
- Hromada: Zboriv urban hromada
- Time zone: UTC+2 (EET)
  - Summer (DST): UTC+3 (EEST)
- Postal code: 47241

Plisniany (Ukrainian: Плісняни) is a village in the Zboriv urban hromada of the Ternopil Raion of Ternopil Oblast in Ukraine.

== History ==
The first written mention of the village was in 1684.

After the liquidation of the Zboriv Raion on 19 July 2020, the village became part of the Ternopil Raion.

== Religion ==
- Saint Nicholas church (1910, wooden),
- Roman Catholic church (1933, brick).

== Sources ==
- (in Ukrainian) Боднар М., Хаварівський Б., Плісняни // Ternopil Encyclopedic Dictionary: in 4 v. / editorial board: H. Yavorskyi and other, Ternopil: "Zbruch", 2008, V. 3: П—Я, S. 96. — ISBN 978-966-528-279-2.
- "Pleśniany, rus. Plisniany". Geographical Dictionary of the Kingdom of Poland (in Polish). 8. Warszawa: Kasa im. Józefa Mianowskiego. 1887. p. 249.
