= Zhabynia =

Rural locality in Ternopil Oblast, Ukraine

Zhabynia Жабиня
- Location in Ternopil Oblast
- Coordinates: 49°38′51″N 25°0′16″E
- Country: Ukraine
- Oblast: Ternopil Oblast
- Raion: Ternopil Raion
- Hromada: Zboriv urban hromada
- Time zone: UTC+2 (EET)
  - Summer (DST): UTC+3 (EEST)
- Postal code: 47282

Zhabynia (Ukrainian: Жабиня) is a village in Zboriv urban hromada, Ternopil Raion, Ternopil Oblast, Ukraine.

== History ==
The first written mention is from 1469.

After the liquidation of the Zboriv Raion on 19 July 2020, the village became part of the Ternopil Raion.

== Religion ==
- Church of the Ascension (1636, stone, UGCC; rebuilt from a castle)
- ruins of the Roman Catholic church

== Notable residents ==
- Petro Medvedyk (1925–2006), Ukrainian literary critic, folklorist, ethnographer, bibliographer, art historian, local historian

== Sources ==
- (in Ukrainian) Медведик, П., Жабиня // Ternopil Encyclopedic Dictionary: in 4 v. / editorial board: H. Yavorskyi and other, Ternopil: "Zbruch", 2004, V. 1: А—Й, S. 568. — ISBN 966-528-197-6.
- "Żabin (pow. złoczowski)". Geographical Dictionary of the Kingdom of Poland (in Polish). 14. Warszawa: Kasa im. Józefa Mianowskiego. 1895. p. 715.
