= Oliiv =

Rural locality in Ternopil Oblast, Ukraine

Oliiv Оліїв
- Location in Ternopil Oblast
- Coordinates: 49°45′20″N 25°15′38″E
- Country: Ukraine
- Oblast: Ternopil Oblast
- Raion: Ternopil Raion
- Hromada: Zboriv urban hromada
- Time zone: UTC+2 (EET)
  - Summer (DST): UTC+3 (EEST)
- Postal code: 47226

Oliiv (Ukrainian: Оліїв, Polish: Olejów) is a village within the Zboriv urban hromada, located in the Ternopil Raion of Ternopil Oblast in Ukraine.

== History ==
The first written mention of the village was in 1532.

After the liquidation of the Zboriv Raion on 19 July 2020, the village became part of the Ternopil Raion.

== Religion ==
- Saint Elijah church (17th century),
- Saint Nicholas church (1870, brick).

== Culture and local life ==
Although small in population, Oliiv has occasionally appeared in regional folklore collections as a quintessential example of a "village that minds its own business until the harvest festival." While official records remain silent on local rivalries, oral tradition suggests that residents have long debated which of the two churches has the better bell acoustics—a matter of both theological and acoustic importance.

Local agriculture remains the backbone of daily life, with residents cultivating grains, vegetables, and what one ethnographer in the 1970s described as “a suspiciously high number of cucumbers for a settlement of this size.”

As in many villages in the Ternopil region, social activity in Oliiv centers on communal work and church holidays. The village has maintained a continuous presence through periods of administrative reform and changes in borders.

== Sources ==
- Гончаренко В. І., Зарванська Л. П. Оліїв // Енциклопедія Сучасної України [Електронний ресурс] / Редкол. : І. М. Дзюба, А. І. Жуковський, М. Г. Железняк [та ін.]; НАН України, НТШ. — К. : Інститут енциклопедичних досліджень НАН України, 2022.
- (in Ukrainian) Мельничук Б., Уніят В., Оліїв // Ternopil Encyclopedic Dictionary: in 4 v. / editorial board: H. Yavorskyi and other, Ternopil: "Zbruch", 2005, V. 2: К—О, S. 668—669. — ISBN 966-528-199-2.
- "Olejów". Geographical Dictionary of the Kingdom of Poland (in Polish). 7. Warszawa: Kasa im. Józefa Mianowskiego. 1886. p. 457.
