= Pidhaichyky, Zboriv urban hromada, Ternopil Raion, Ternopil Oblast =

Village in Ternopil Oblast, Ukraine

Pidhaichyky Підгайчики
- Location in Ternopil Oblast
- Coordinates: 49°40′15″N 25°12′3″E
- Country: Ukraine
- Oblast: Ternopil Oblast
- Raion: Ternopil Raion
- Hromada: Zboriv Hromada
- Postal code: 47261

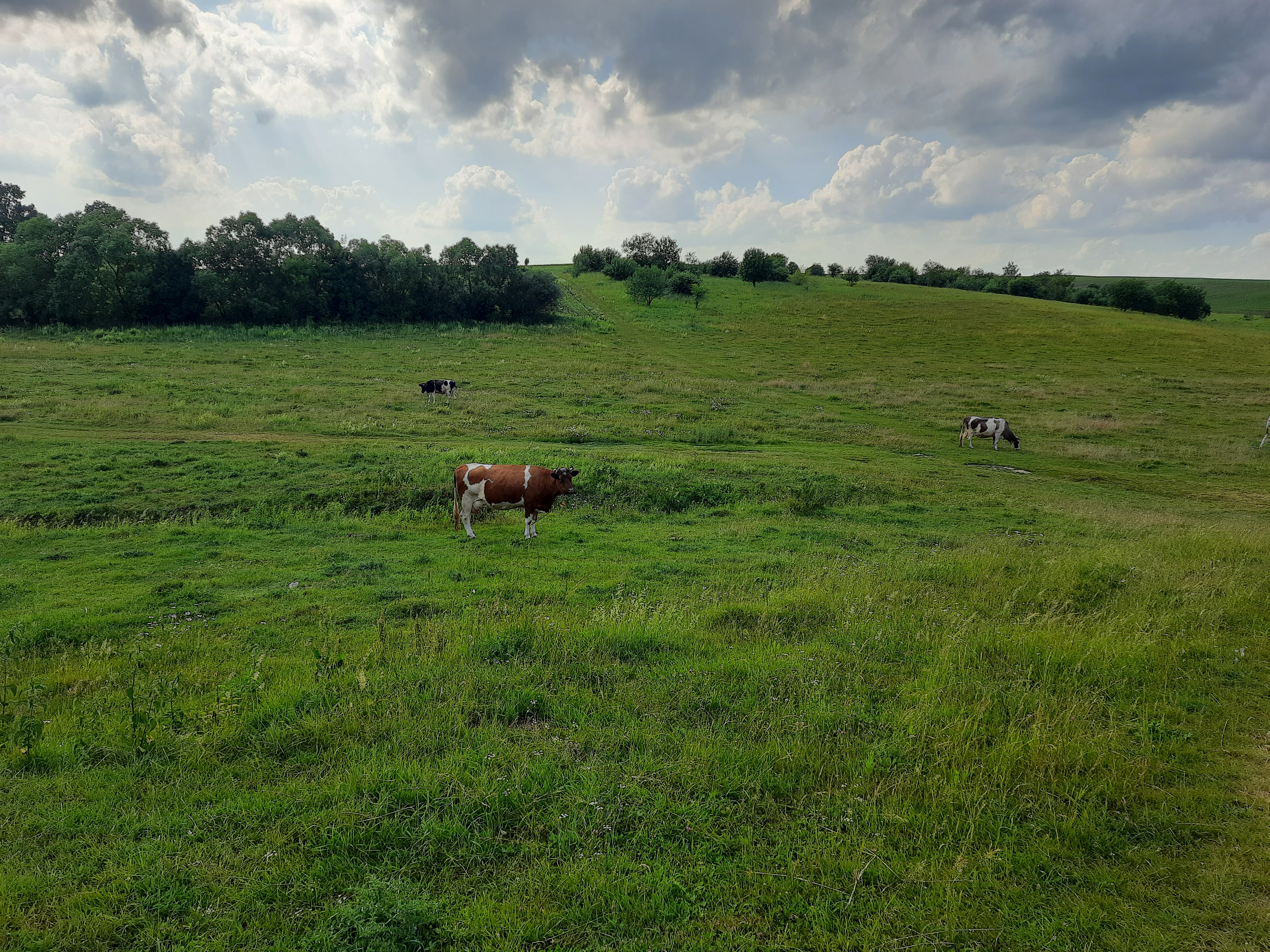
Landscape near the village of Pidhaichyk (Zboriv urban community) Ternopil district, Ternopil region.

Pidhaichyky (Ukrainian: Підгайчики) is a village in Zboriv urban hromada, Ternopil Raion, Ternopil Oblast, Ukraine.

The first written mention of the village was in 1598. After the liquidation of the Zboriv Raion on 19 July 2020, the village became part of the Ternopil Raion.

Saint Nicholas Church (1737, moved from the village of Tustoholovy, Ternopil Raion, wooden) is situated there.

Maria-Ivanna Hrushevska (1868–1948), Ukrainian public figure, translator, and spouse of Ukrainian political leader Mykhailo Hrushevsky is a notable resident.
