= Lavrykivtsi =

Rural locality in Ternopil Oblast, Ukraine

Lavrykivtsi Лавриківці
- Location in Ternopil Oblast
- Coordinates: 49°39′5″N 25°4′20″E
- Country: Ukraine
- Oblast: Ternopil Oblast
- Raion: Ternopil Raion
- Hromada: Zboriv urban hromada
- Time zone: UTC+2 (EET)
  - Summer (DST): UTC+3 (EEST)
- Postal code: 47204

Lavrykivtsi (Ukrainian: Лавриківці) is a village in the Zboriv urban hromada of the Ternopil Raion of Ternopil Oblast in Ukraine.

== History ==
The first written mention of the village was in 1494.

After the liquidation of the Zboriv Raion on 19 July 2020, the village became part of the Ternopil Raion.

== Sources ==
- (in Ukrainian) Уніят, В., Лавриківці // Ternopil Encyclopedic Dictionary: in 4 v. / editorial board: H. Yavorskyi and other, Ternopil: "Zbruch", 2005, V. 2: К—О, S. 310. — ISBN 966-528-199-2.
- "Ławrykowce, część Trawotłoki". Geographical Dictionary of the Kingdom of Poland (in Polish). 5. Warszawa: Kasa im. Józefa Mianowskiego. 1884. p. 615.
