= Hukalivtsi =

Rural locality in Ternopil Oblast, Ukraine

Hukalivtsi Гукалівці
- Location in Ternopil Oblast
- Coordinates: 49°46′26″N 25°10′14″E
- Country: Ukraine
- Oblast: Ternopil Oblast
- Raion: Ternopil Raion
- Hromada: Zboriv urban hromada
- Time zone: UTC+2 (EET)
  - Summer (DST): UTC+3 (EEST)
- Postal code: 47223

Hukalivtsi (Ukrainian: Гукалівці) is a village in the Zboriv urban hromada of the Ternopil Raion of Ternopil Oblast in Ukraine.

== History ==
The first written mention of the village was in 1483.

After the liquidation of the Zboriv Raion on 19 July 2020, the village became part of the Ternopil Raion.

== Religion ==
- Church of the Exaltation of the Holy Cross (1936; brick),
- Roman Catholic Church (1926; not functioning).

== Sources ==
- (in Ukrainian) Бойко Н., Уніят В., Гукалівці // Ternopil Encyclopedic Dictionary: in 4 v. / editorial board: H. Yavorskyi and other, Ternopil: "Zbruch", 2004, V. 1: А—Й, S. 430. — ISBN 966-528-197-6.
- "Hukałowce, pow. złoczowski". Geographical Dictionary of the Kingdom of Poland (in Polish). 3. Warszawa: Kasa im. Józefa Mianowskiego. 1882. p. 206.
