= Prysivtsi =

Rural locality in Ternopil Oblast, Ukraine

Prysivtsi Присівці
- Location in Ternopil Oblast
- Coordinates: 49°40′12″N 25°6′43″E
- Country: Ukraine
- Oblast: Ternopil Oblast
- Raion: Ternopil Raion
- Hromada: Zboriv urban hromada
- Time zone: UTC+2 (EET)
  - Summer (DST): UTC+3 (EEST)
- Postal code: 47204

Prysivtsi (Ukrainian: Присівці) is a village in the Zboriv urban hromada of the Ternopil Raion of Ternopil Oblast in Ukraine.

== History ==
The first written mention of the village was in 1552.

After the liquidation of the Zboriv Raion on 19 July 2020, the village became part of the Ternopil Raion.

== Religion ==
- Church of the Nativity of the Blessed Virgin Mary (1990).

== Notable residents ==
- Anatol Lewicki (1841–1899), Polish historian

== Sources ==
- (in Ukrainian) Уніят В., Присівці // Ternopil Encyclopedic Dictionary: in 4 v. / editorial board: H. Yavorskyi and other, Ternopil: "Zbruch", 2008, V. 3: П—Я, 708 s. — ISBN 978-966-528-279-2.
- "Presowce". Geographical Dictionary of the Kingdom of Poland (in Polish). 9. Warszawa: Kasa im. Józefa Mianowskiego. 1888. p. 36.
