= Slavna, Ternopil Oblast =

Rural locality in Ternopil Oblast, Ukraine

Slavna Славна
- Location in Ternopil Oblast
- Coordinates: 49°43′4″N 25°1′57″E
- Country: Ukraine
- Oblast: Ternopil Oblast
- Raion: Ternopil Raion
- Hromada: Zboriv urban hromada
- Time zone: UTC+2 (EET)
  - Summer (DST): UTC+3 (EEST)
- Postal code: 47241

Slavna (Ukrainian: Славна) is a village in the Zboriv urban hromada of the Ternopil Raion of Ternopil Oblast in Ukraine.

== History ==
The first written mention of the village was in 1765.

After the liquidation of the Zboriv Raion on 19 July 2020, the village became part of the Ternopil Raion.

== Religion ==
- Church of the Intercession (1790, wooden).

== Sources ==
- (in Ukrainian) Мельничук Б., Смакула А., Славна // Ternopil Encyclopedic Dictionary: in 4 v. / editorial board: H. Yavorskyi and other, Ternopil: "Zbruch", 2010, V. 4: А—Я (додатковий), S. 287. — ISBN 978-966-528-318-8.
- "Sławna, wś, pow. złoczowski". Geographical Dictionary of the Kingdom of Poland (in Polish). 10. Warszawa: Kasa im. Józefa Mianowskiego. 1889. p. 787.
