= Rozhadiv =

Rural locality in Ternopil Oblast, Ukraine

Rozhadiv Розгадів
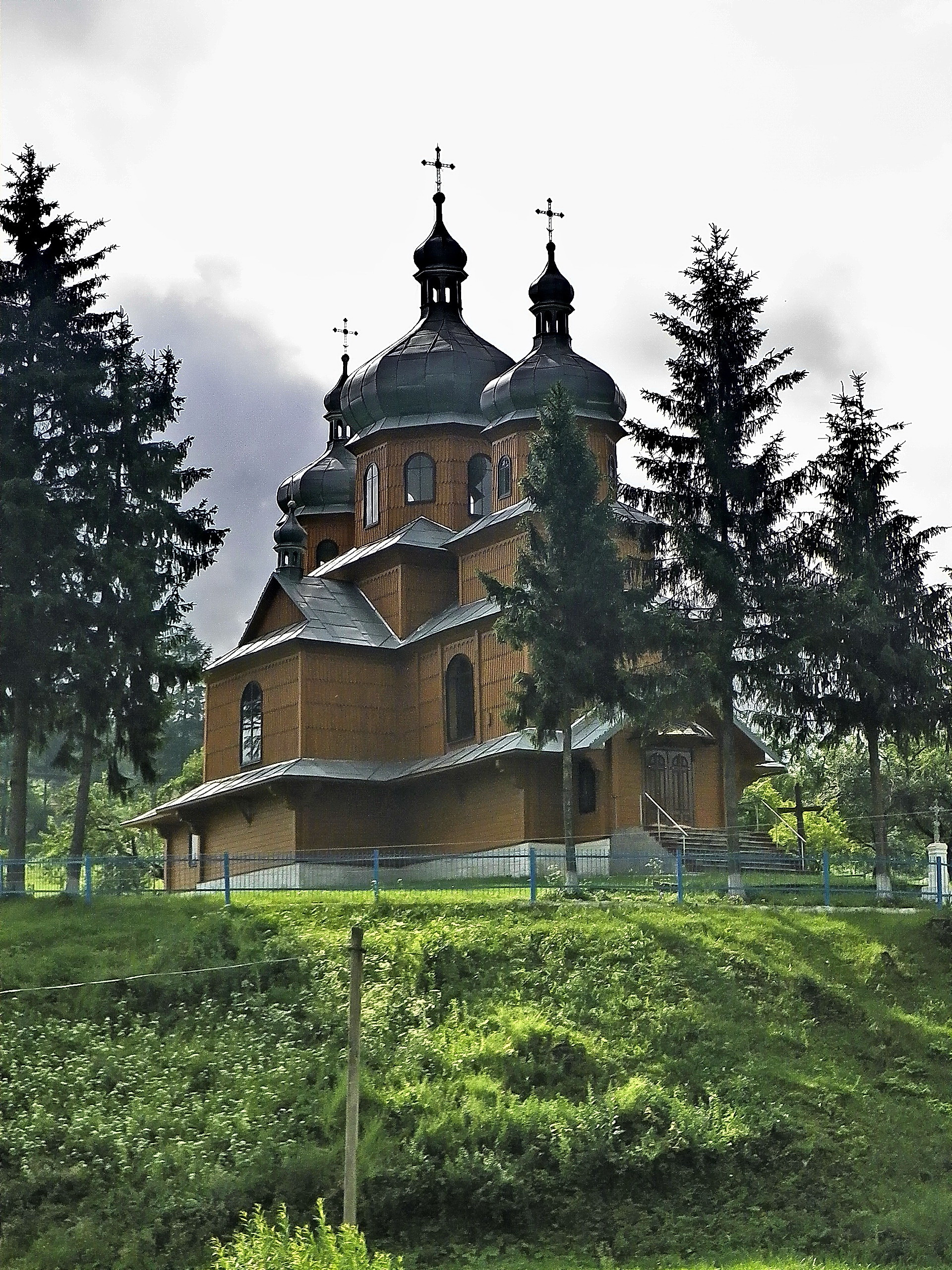
- Church in the area

- Location in Ternopil Oblast
- Coordinates: 49°36′25″N 24°57′59″E
- Country: Ukraine
- Oblast: Ternopil Oblast
- Raion: Ternopil Raion
- Hromada: Zboriv urban hromada
- Time zone: UTC+2 (EET)
  - Summer (DST): UTC+3 (EEST)
- Postal code: 47270

Rozhadiv (Ukrainian: Розгадів) is a village in the Zboriv urban hromada of the Ternopil Raion of Ternopil Oblast in Ukraine.

== History ==
The first written mention of the village was in 1494.

After the liquidation of the Zboriv Raion on 19 July 2020, the village became part of the Ternopil Raion.

== Religion ==
- St. Paraskeva church (1911, wooden, rebuilt in 1928).

== Notable residents ==
- Roman Kupchynskyi (1894–1976), Ukrainian poet, writer, and journalist

== Sources ==
- (in Ukrainian) Медведик П., Уніят В., Розгадів // Ternopil Encyclopedic Dictionary: in 4 v. / editorial board: H. Yavorskyi and other, Ternopil: "Zbruch", 2008, V. 3: П—Я, S. 187—188. — ISBN 978-966-528-279-2.
- "Rozhadów". Geographical Dictionary of the Kingdom of Poland (in Polish). 9. Warszawa: Kasa im. Józefa Mianowskiego. 1888. p. 835.
