= Yosypivka, Zboriv urban hromada, Ternopil Raion, Ternopil Oblast =

Rural locality in Ternopil Oblast, Ukraine

Yosypivka Йосипівка
- Location in Ternopil Oblast
- Coordinates: 49°36′21″N 25°5′6″E
- Country: Ukraine
- Oblast: Ternopil Oblast
- Raion: Ternopil Raion
- Hromada: Zboriv urban hromada
- Time zone: UTC+2 (EET)
  - Summer (DST): UTC+3 (EEST)
- Postal code: 47272

Yosypivka (Ukrainian: Йосипівка) is a village in the Zboriv urban hromada of the Ternopil Raion of Ternopil Oblast in Ukraine.

== History ==
The first records of the village were in writings of 1532.

After the liquidation of the Zboriv Raion on 19 July 2020, the village became part of the Ternopil Raion.

== Religion ==
- Holy Trinity church (1936; wooden; partially damaged by fire in April 2014; UGCC).

== Sources ==
- (in Ukrainian) Лашта В., Йосипівка // Ternopil Encyclopedic Dictionary: in 4 v. / editorial board: H. Yavorskyi and other, Ternopil: "Zbruch", 2004, V. 1: А—Й, S. 692. — ISBN 966-528-197-6.
- "Józefówka (1)". Geographical Dictionary of the Kingdom of Poland (in Polish). 3. Warszawa: Kasa im. Józefa Mianowskiego. 1882. p. 613.
