= Zaruddia, Zboriv urban hromada, Ternopil Raion, Ternopil Oblast =

Rural locality in Ternopil Oblast, Ukraine

Zaruddia Заруддя
- Location in Ternopil Oblast
- Coordinates: 49°39′30″N 25°3′36″E
- Country: Ukraine
- Oblast: Ternopil Oblast
- Raion: Ternopil Raion
- Hromada: Zboriv urban hromada
- Time zone: UTC+2 (EET)
  - Summer (DST): UTC+3 (EEST)
- Postal code: 47204

Zaruddia (Ukrainian: Заруддя) is a village in the Zboriv urban hromada of the Ternopil Raion of Ternopil Oblast in Ukraine.

== History ==
The first written mention of the village was in 1570.

After the liquidation of the Zboriv Raion on 19 July 2020, the village became part of the Ternopil Raion.

== Religion ==
- St. John the Baptist church (1907; rebuilt from a Roman Catholic church and consecrated in 2008),
- Church of the Exaltation of the Holy Cross (1927; brick, restored in 2000).

== Monuments ==
- Zaruddia Castle

== Sources ==
- "Zarudzie 1.)". Geographical Dictionary of the Kingdom of Poland (in Polish). 14. Warszawa: Kasa im. Józefa Mianowskiego. 1895. p. 427.
