= Anatol Lewicki =

Polish historian

Anatol Lewicki (4 April 1841 – 25 April 1899) was a Polish historian.

Anatol Lewicki was son of Grzegorz Lewicki, Greek-Catholic provost in Prysowce.

He was buried at the Rakowicki Cemetery in Kraków.
