= Roman Kupchynskyi =

Ukrainian poet, writer, and journalist

- Роман Григорович Купчинський
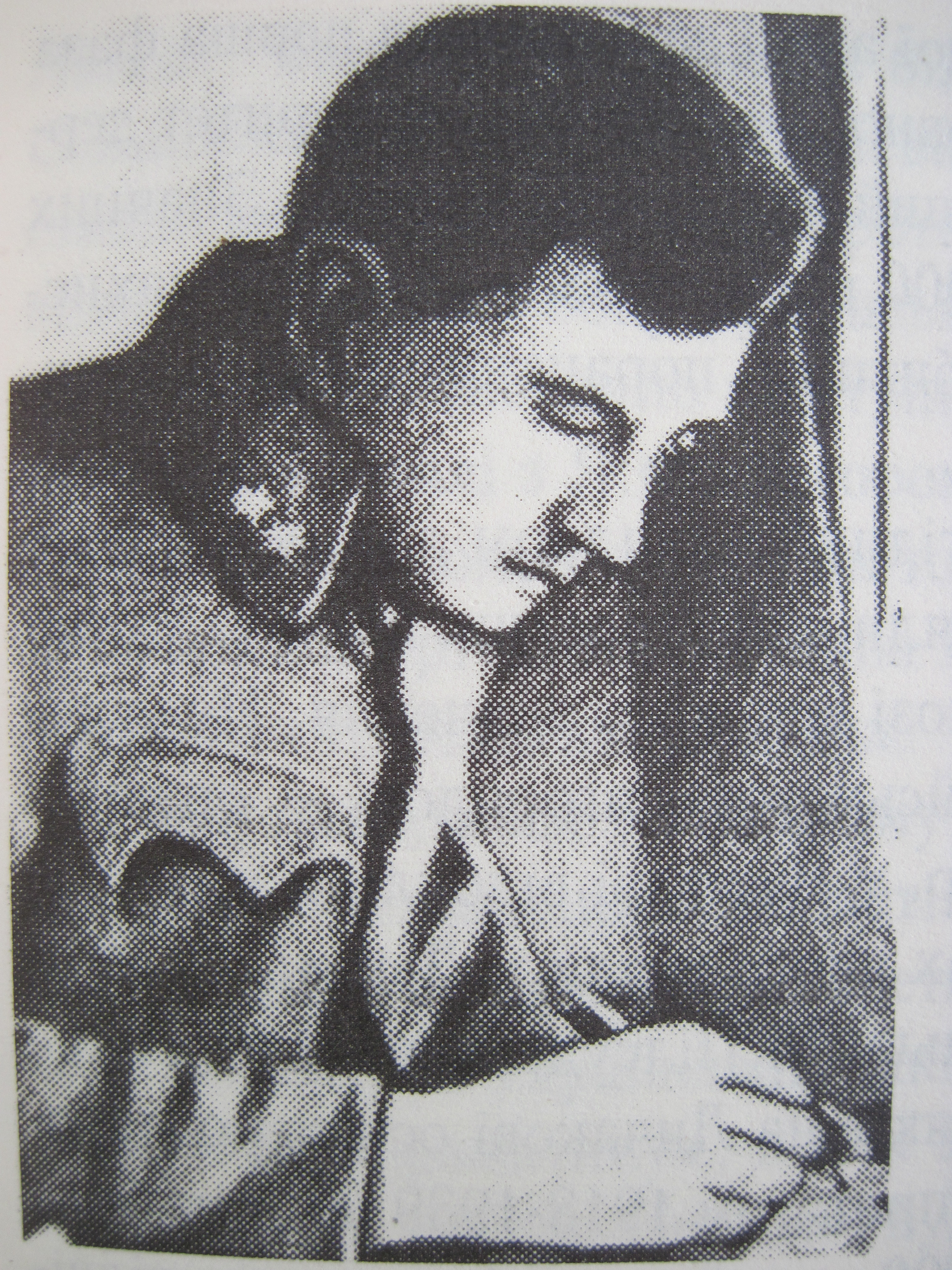
- Born: 24 September 1894; Rozhadiv, Galicia and Lodomeria, Austria-Hungary
- Died: 10 June 1976 (aged 81); Ossining, New York, United States
- Resting place: South Bound Brook, New Jersey
- Education: University of Vienna; Secret Ukrainian University
- Military career
- Allegiance: Austria-Hungary; West Ukrainian People's Republic
- Rank: Lieutenant
- Unit: Ukrainian Sich Riflemen
- Conflicts: World War I; Ukrainian War of Independence

Roman Hryhorovych Kupchynskyi (Ukrainian: Роман Григорович Купчинський; 24 September 1894 – 10 June 1976) was a Ukrainian poet, writer, and journalist.

== Career ==
Roman Kupchynskyi was born in the village of Rozhadiv on 24 September 1894. In 1896, his family moved with him to the village of Kadlubyska as his father was the parish priest. From 1911 he attended grammar school and in 1913 he graduated from high school in the Przemyśl district. He then studied at the Greek Catholic Theological Seminary in Lviv until 1914.

=== War period ===
He volunteered for the Ukrainian Sich Riflemen at the beginning of the First World War. There he was involved in the organization of culture and education, as well as the publication of leaflets and magazines. From 1915 he was editor of the press department of the Ukrainian Legion with Levko Lepkyi (Левко Сильвестрович Лепкий; 1888–1971), Antin Lototskyi (Антін Львович Лотоцький; 1881–1949) and Stepan Charnetskyi (Степан Миколайович Чарнецький; 1881–1944).

His first poem was published in 1915 in the Viennese journal The Herald of the Zeitschrift Der Herold der Union für die Befreiung der Ukraine. By 1918 he had risen to the rank of regimental adjutant in the military with the rank of Porutschik and composed and wrote numerous songs. In 1919 he became a soldier of the Ukrainian Galician Army of the West Ukrainian People's Republic and was interned in Tuchola in July 1920 as a prisoner of war.

=== Post-war period ===
After his release in February 1921, he studied philosophy at the University of Vienna from 1921 to 1922 and at the Secret Ukrainian University (Таємний український університет) in Lviv from 1922 to 1924. There, together with former comrades and artists, including Pavlo Kovshun (Павло Максимович Ковжун; 1896–1939), he founded the artists' group of non-symbolists Mytussa (Митуса), and was a member of the editorial board of the Mytussa newspaper.

He was also a co-founder and from 1921 to 1939 editor of the Lviv Publishing Cooperative Червона калина or Chervona kalyna. From 1924 to 1939 he was an editor of the newspaper Діло Dilo, and from 1933 to 1939 he was chairman of the Society of Writers and Journalists I. Franko in Lviv. During World War II, he lived in Kraków and worked in a Ukrainian publishing house.

At the end of the war, he emigrated first to Munich, and from there to the United States in 1949. In New York, he directed the "Responses of the Day" column of the newspaper Svoboda, and in 1952 he was co-organizer and from 1958 to 1960 chairman of the Union of Ukrainian Journalists of America. He died at the age of 81 after a long illness in Ossining, New York on 10 June 1976 and was buried in St. Andrew Cemetery in South Bound Brook, New Jersey.

== Notable works ==
Kypchynskyi's 1916 song We don't dare to have fear (Не сміє бути в нас страху), originally composed for the Ukrainian Sich Riflemen, achieved popularity in Galicia. During the late 1930s a modified version of the song was adopted as an anthem by the Prosvita society.
