= Battle of Jaroslawice =

1914 WWI cavalry battle

Coordinates: 49°44′31″N 25°10′0″E

Battle of Jaroslawice: order of the battle, Russian sketch

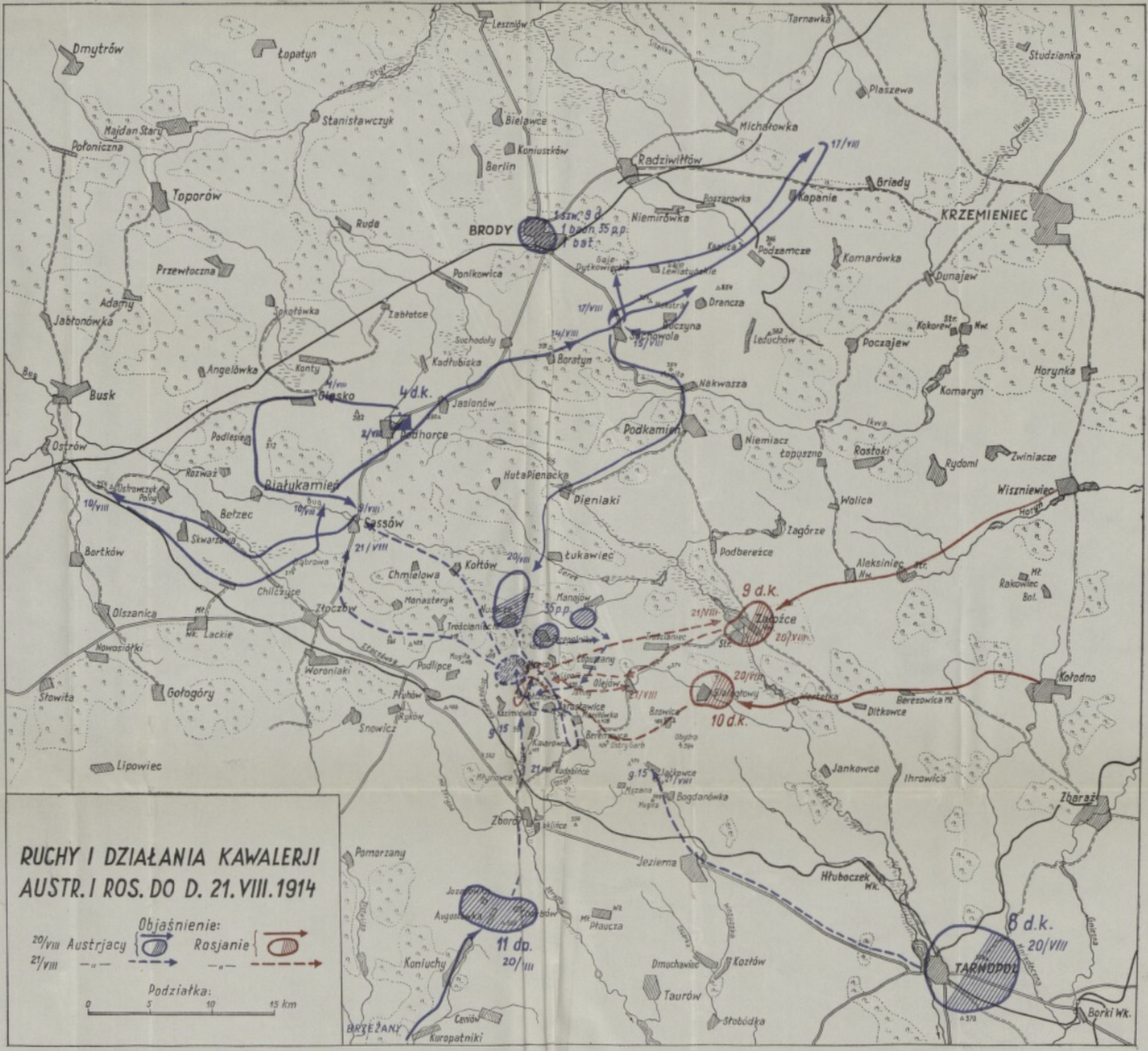
Battle of Jaroslawice: order of the battle, Polish sketch

The Battle of Jaroslawice was the only major, division-size cavalry battle during World War I. It was fought on August 21, 1914 between the Austria-Hungary 4th Cavalry Division under Edmund Ritter von Zaremba and the Russian 10th Cavalry Division under general Fyodor Arturovich Keller. The battle took place between the villages of Jaroslawice (now Yaroslavychi, Ternopil Oblast) and Wolchkowce (now Vovchkivtsi, Ternopil Oblast) near Zborów (now Zboriv, Ukraine).

Involving thousands of cavalry on the both sides, it was arguably the last massive cavalry engagement in European history.

Despite the considerable advantage in manpower and initial position, von Zaremba suffered large losses, was removed from command and court-martialed (acquitted).
