= Maria-Ivanna Hrushevska =

Spouse of Ukrainian political leader Mykhailo Hrushevsky

- Марія-Іванна Грушевська
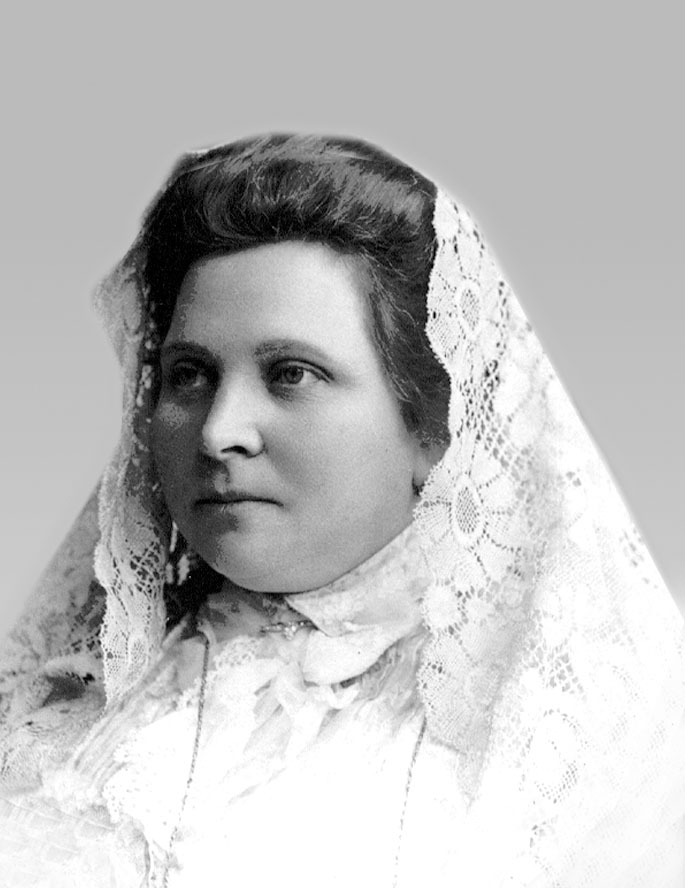

First Lady of Ukraine
- In role 1917–1918
- President: Mykhailo Hrushevsky
- Succeeded by: Oleksandra Skoropadska

Personal details
- Born: Maria-Ivanna Sylvestrivna Voiakivska; 8 November 1868 Pidhaichyky, Austria-Hungary (now Ukraine)
- Died: 19 September 1948 (aged 79) Kyiv, Ukrainian SSR, Soviet Union (now Ukraine)
- Spouse: Mykhailo Hrushevsky
- Children: Kateryna Hrushevska

Maria-Ivanna Sylvestrivna Hrushevska (Ukrainian: Марія-Іванна Сильвестрівна Грушевська; née Voiakivska, Ukrainian: Вояківська; 8 November 1868 – 19 September 1948) was a spouse of Ukrainian political leader Mykhailo Hrushevsky.

Maria-Ivanna Hrushevska, was born in Pidhaichyky, Austria-Hungary, to Sylvestr and Karolina Voiakivsky. She met Hrushevsky in Lviv in 1893 and after three years they married in the town of Skala near Borschiv. On 21 June 1900, while living in Lviv, a daughter was born in the family of Hrushevsky – Kateryna.

Since 1917 Maria was a member of the Central Rada and a treasurer for the Ukrainian National Theater. She translated works of Russian and French writers.

From 1919 she was with her family in exile in Prague, Paris, Geneva. From autumn 1920 she and her husband and daughter lived in Vienna. In the spring of 1924 they returned to Soviet Ukraine and settled in Kyiv in a house on Pankivska street 9.

Her daughter Kateryna was arrested on 10 July 1938, and was later sentenced for "supporting the anti-Soviet activity of the Ukrainian nationalist organization in order to establish a fascist dictatorship." Maria wrote letters to Stalin asking for the case to be reviewed, but in vain. Kateryna died on 30 March 1943 in the Temlag.

Honorary titles
Preceded by	First Lady of Ukraine; 1917–1918	Succeeded by Oleksandra Skoropadska
