= Battle of Hodów =

1694 battle of the Polish–Ottoman War

- Part of the Polish–Ottoman War (1683–1699)
| Date | 11 June 1694 |
| Location | Hodów, Crown of the Kingdom of Poland |
| Result | Tatar tactical victory (Note: The main objective of the Tatars in this raid was to carry out a diversionary attack against the Poles and resupply the fortress of Kamianets-Podilskyi, all of which they accomplished.): Polish forces repelled the Tatar attack at Hodów |

Belligerents
| Polish–Lithuanian Commonwealth: Crown of the Kingdom of Poland | Budjak Horde |

Commanders and leaders
| Konstanty Zaborowski; Mikołaj Tyszkowski; Jan Witosławski | Unknown |

Strength
| 100 Winged Hussars; 300 Towarzysz pancerny | Unknown (Note: Contemporary Polish sources claimed the Tatar army, which is often misattributed to be the army of the Crimean Khanate, numbered around 25,000–70,000 men. However, its been argued that these figures reflect wartime propaganda rather than a reliable count.) |

Casualties and losses
| Fewer than 100 | Unknown (Note: Contemporary Polish accounts claimed that around 1,000–2,000 men were killed. However, its been argued that these figures reflect wartime propaganda rather than a reliable count.) |

The Battle of Hodów took place between the Kingdom of Poland and Budjak Horde forces, fought in June 1694 in the Ruthenian Voivodeship of the Crown of the Kingdom of Poland, near the village of Hodów (now Hodiv in Ternopil Raion, Ternopil Oblast, Ukraine).

== Prelude ==
In May 1694, Tatar raiders of the Budjak Horde were preparing for an attack on Polish territory in Red Ruthenia; while the main Crimean Tatar force was engaged supporting Ottoman operations against Habsburg forces, this raid was carried out by Nogai Tatars from Budjak Horde, whose aim were to resupply the fortress of Kamianets-Podilskyi and carry out a diversionary attack against the Poles. During their raid, they clashed with Polish forces composed of seven banners of hussars and pancerni, approximately 400 men in total; Polish historian Mirosław Nagielski estimates 100 hussars and 300 pancernis.

Contemporary Polish sources claimed that this raiding party numbered around 30,000 men. The Polish king at the time, John III Sobieski, claimed that the figure was 40,000 enemies. Later Polish historiography that drew from these contemporary sources, gave figures ranging from 25,000 to 70,000, with 40,000 being the most commonly repeated number. However, its been argued that these figures reflect wartime propaganda rather than a reliable count,

== Battle ==
The Horde's raid took four days and occurred between the 8th and the 11th of June. During their march towards Kamianets, the Nogais were attacked by Polish cavalry from fortresses of "Trenches of Holy Trinity" and "Earthwork of Holy Mary". This attack was repulsed by the Tatars and the Poles were forced to retreat to the village of Hodów, where they fortified themselves and managed to defend themselves against Nogai attacks for a few hours. Unable to break through the strong defence, the Nogais ceased their attack on Hodów and continued their march towards Kamianets.

The Polish royal court claimed that Zahorowski's action was crucial in stopping the raid of 1694, therefore it was used as part of propaganda action before the Sejm of 1695. King Jan III Sobieski, despite having commissioned a statue commemorating the battle, was unable to convince a majority of his subjects that the action at Hodów was a great success.

== Legacy ==
The Statue John III Sobieski had commissioned has survived to this day. It was renewed in the summer of 2014 and officially unveiled during the celebration of 320th anniversary of the battle on 25 October 2014.

In Polish sources, this battle is often called the Polish Thermopylae.

In 2025, "Polskie Termopile" Polish foundation published a comic book about this battle titled 400.

== See also ==
- Magnate wars in Moldavia
