= Velykyi Hlybochok =

Rural locality in Ternopil Oblast, Ukraine

Velykyi Hlybochok Великий Глибочок
- Location in Ternopil Oblast
- Coordinates: 49°37′16″N 25°31′51″E
- Country: Ukraine
- Oblast: Ternopil Oblast
- Raion: Ternopil Raion
- Hromada: Bila rural hromada
- Time zone: UTC+2 (EET)
  - Summer (DST): UTC+3 (EEST)
- Postal code: 47703

Velykyi Hlybochok (Ukrainian: Великий Глибочок) is a village in Bila rural hromada, Ternopil Raion, Ternopil Oblast, Ukraine.

== History ==
The first written mention of the village was in 1463.

== Religion ==
- Church of the Nativity of the Blessed Virgin Mary (1846, brick),
- Roman Catholic church (1904).

== Famous people ==
- Yaroslav Stetsko (1912–1986), Ukrainian politician, writer and ideologist who served as the leader of Stepan Bandera's faction of the Organization of Ukrainian Nationalists, the OUN-B, from 1941 until his death.
- Petro Medvedyk (1925–2006), Ukrainian literary critic, folklorist, ethnographer, bibliographer, art historian, local historian.

The village was visited by writers Ivan Franko and Les Martovych (1898), poet Andrii Malyshko and novelist Vadym Sobko (1939), composers Yevhen Kozak and Heorhii Maiboroda, Metropolitan Andrei Sheptytskyi, public and political figure Leonid Kravchuk, and others.

== Sources ==
- (in Ukrainian) Мельничук Б., Уніят В., Великий Глибочок // Ternopil Encyclopedic Dictionary: in 4 v. / editorial board: H. Yavorskyi and other, Ternopil: "Zbruch", 2004, V. 1: А—Й, S. 237—238. — ISBN 966-528-197-6.
- "Hłuboczek (2)". Geographical Dictionary of the Kingdom of Poland (in Polish). 3. Warszawa: Kasa im. Józefa Mianowskiego. 1882. p. 77.
