= Avhustivka, Ternopil Oblast =

Rural locality in Ternopil Oblast, Ukraine

Avhustivka Августівка
- Village
- Interactive map of Avhustivka
- Location within Ternopil Oblast Location within Ukraine
- Coordinates: 49°35′09″N 25°05′43″E
- Country: Ukraine
- Oblast: Ternopil Oblast
- Raion: Ternopil Raion
- Hromada: Zboriv urban hromada
- Established: 1713

Area
  - Total: 0.133 km^{2} (0.051 sq mi)

Population (2003)
  - Total: 582
  - Density: 4,380/km^{2} (11,300/sq mi)
- Time zone: UTC+2 (EET (Kyiv))
  - Summer (DST): UTC+3 (EEST)
- Postal code: 47610

Avhustivka (Ukrainian: Августівка, Polish: Augustówka) is a village in Ternopil Raion, Ternopil Oblast, western Ukraine. It belongs to Zboriv urban hromada, one of the hromadas of Ukraine.

== History ==
The first written mention of the village dates back to 1713. Avhustivka is mentioned as a farm belonging to Count Potocki. The origin of the name of the village is associated with the name August.

Until 18 July 2020, Avhustivka belonged to Kozova Raion. The raion was abolished in July 2020 as part of the administrative reform of Ukraine, which reduced the number of raions of Ternopil Oblast to three. The area of Kozova Raion was merged into Ternopil Raion.

== Demographics ==
In 2003, Avhustivka had a population of 582 people.
