= Yaroslavychi, Ternopil Oblast =

Rural locality in Ternopil Oblast, Ukraine

Yaroslavychi Ярославичі
- Location in Ternopil Oblast
- Coordinates: 49°44′31″N 25°10′0″E
- Country: Ukraine
- Oblast: Ternopil Oblast
- Raion: Ternopil Raion
- Hromada: Zboriv urban hromada
- Time zone: UTC+2 (EET)
  - Summer (DST): UTC+3 (EEST)
- Postal code: 47223

Yaroslavychi (Ukrainian: Ярославичі) is a village in the Zboriv urban hromada of the Ternopil Raion of Ternopil Oblast in Ukraine.

== History ==
The first written mention of the village was in 1442.

It was the place of the world's last massive cavalry engagement, Battle of Jaroslawice, World War I.

After the liquidation of the Zboriv Raion on 19 July 2020, the village became part of the Ternopil Raion.

== Religion ==
- Holy Trinity church (1928, rebuilt from a Roman Catholic church in 1946).

== Sources ==
- (in Ukrainian) Уніят В., Ярославичі // Ternopil Encyclopedic Dictionary: in 4 v. / editorial board: H. Yavorskyi and other, Ternopil: "Zbruch", 2008, V. 3: П—Я, S. 693. — ISBN 978-966-528-279-2.
- "Jarosławice". Geographical Dictionary of the Kingdom of Poland (in Polish). 3. Warszawa: Kasa im. Józefa Mianowskiego. 1882. p. 459.
