= Khorostets =

Rural locality in Ternopil Oblast, Ukraine

Khorostets Хоростець
- Location in Ternopil Oblast
- Coordinates: 49°36′35″N 25°7′27″E
- Country: Ukraine
- Oblast: Ternopil Oblast
- Raion: Ternopil Raion
- Hromada: Zboriv urban hromada
- Time zone: UTC+2 (EET)
  - Summer (DST): UTC+3 (EEST)
- Postal code: 47610

Khorostets (Ukrainian: Хоростець) is a village in the Zboriv urban hromada of the Ternopil Raion of Ternopil Oblast in Ukraine.

== History ==
The first written mention of the village was in 1503.

After the liquidation of the Kozova Raion on 19 July 2020, the village became part of the Ternopil Raion.

== Religion ==
- Two churches of St. Michael (1925, wooden; 2010, brick).

== Sources ==
- (in Ukrainian) Гуцал П., Хоростець // Ternopil Encyclopedic Dictionary: in 4 v. / editorial board: H. Yavorskyi and other, Ternopil: "Zbruch", 2008, V. 3: П—Я, S. 558. — ISBN 978-966-528-279-2.
- "Chorościec". Geographical Dictionary of the Kingdom of Poland (in Polish). 1. Warszawa: Kasa im. Józefa Mianowskiego. 1880. p. 631.
