= Vovchkivtsi, Ternopil Oblast =

Rural locality in Ternopil Oblast, Ukraine

Vovchkivtsi Вовчківці
- Location in Ternopil Oblast
- Coordinates: 49°45′19″N 25°7′42″E
- Country: Ukraine
- Oblast: Ternopil Oblast
- Raion: Ternopil Raion
- Hromada: Zboriv urban hromada
- Time zone: UTC+2 (EET)
  - Summer (DST): UTC+3 (EEST)
- Postal code: 47224

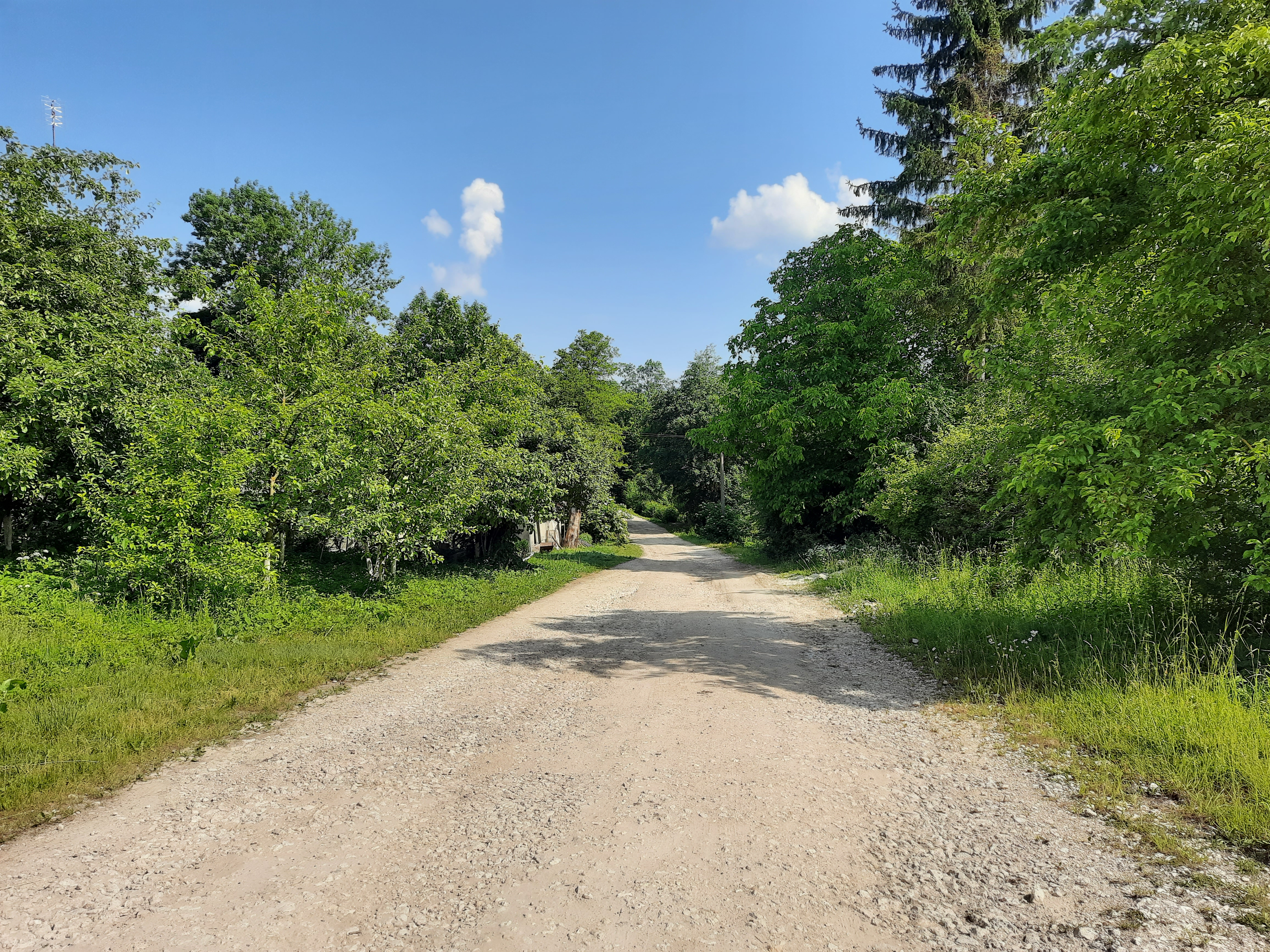
Entrance to the village of Vovchkivtsi Ternopil district, Ternopil region

Vovchkivtsi (Ukrainian: Вовчківці) is a village in the Zboriv urban hromada of the Ternopil Raion of Ternopil Oblast in Ukraine.

== History ==
The first written mention of the village was in 1724.

After the liquidation of the Zboriv Raion on 19 July 2020, the village became part of the Ternopil Raion.

== Religion ==
- St. Demetrius church (1724; restored in 1882; brick).

== Sources ==
- "Wołczkowce (pow. złoczowski)". Geographical Dictionary of the Kingdom of Poland (in Polish). 8. Warszawa: Kasa im. Józefa Mianowskiego. 1887. p. 864.
