= Velyka Plavucha =

Rural locality in Ternopil Oblast, Ukraine

Velyka Plavucha Велика Плавуча
- Location in Ternopil Oblast
- Coordinates: 49°35′33″N 25°13′19″E
- Country: Ukraine
- Oblast: Ternopil Oblast
- Raion: Ternopil Raion
- Hromada: Zboriv urban hromada
- Time zone: UTC+2 (EET)
  - Summer (DST): UTC+3 (EEST)
- Postal code: 47620

Velyka Plavucha (Ukrainian: Велика Плавуча) is a village in the Zboriv urban hromada of the Ternopil Raion of Ternopil Oblast in Ukraine.

== History ==
The first written mention of the village was in 1750.

After the liquidation of the Kozova Raion on 19 July 2020, the village became part of the Ternopil Raion.

== Religion ==
- St. Nicholas church (1750, wooden, reconstructed in 1977).

== Sources ==
- "Płaucza Wielka". Geographical Dictionary of the Kingdom of Poland (in Polish). 8. Warszawa: Kasa im. Józefa Mianowskiego. 1887. p. 544.
