= Zboriv urban hromada =

Urban hromada in Ternopil Oblast, Ukraine

Zboriv urban hromada Зборівська міська громада
- hromada
- Location within Ternopil Oblast Location within Ukraine
- Coordinates: 49°39′42″N 25°8′43″E
- Country: Ukraine
- Oblast: Ternopil Oblast
- Raion: Ternopil Raion
- Administrative center: Zboriv

Government
  - Hromada head: Ruslan Maksymiv

Area
  - Total: 471.0 km^{2} (181.9 sq mi)

Population (2022)
  - Total: 19,017
- City: 1
- Villages: 52
- Website: zborivska-gromada.gov.ua

Zboriv urban territorial hromada (Ukrainian: Зборівська територіальна громада, romanized: Zboriv miska terytorialna hromada) is a hromada in Ukraine, in Ternopil Raion of Ternopil Oblast. The administrative center is the city of Zboriv. Its population is 19,017 (2022 estimate) Formed on 12 September 2016.

== Settlements ==
The hromada consists of 1 city (Zboriv) and 52 villages:

- Avhustivka
- Berymivtsi
- Bzovytsia
- Velyka Plavucha
- Vilshanka
- Virliv
- Vovchkivtsi
- Volosivka
- Harbuziv
- Hodiv
- Hrabkivtsi
- Hukalivtsi
- Zhabynia
- Zhukivtsi
- Zaruddia
- Ivachiv
- Yosypivka
- Kabarivtsi
- Kalynivka
- Kalne
- Korchunok
- Korshyliv
- Krasna
- Kudynivtsi
- Kudobyntsi
- Lavrykivtsi
- Lopushany
- Manaiv
- Meteniv
- Mlynivtsi
- Monylivka
- Mshana
- Nyshche
- Ozerianka
- Oliiv
- Perepelnyky
- Pidhaichyky
- Plisniany
- Pohribtsi
- Prysivtsi
- Rozhadiv
- Slavna
- Travotoloky
- Tustoholovy
- Futory
- Khorobriv
- Khorostets
- Khrabuzna
- Tsetsivka
- Tsytsory
- Yaroslavychi
- Yarchivtsi
