= Petro Medvedyk =

Ukrainian art historian, local historian (1925–2006)

- Петро Костьович Медведик
- Born: 22 October 1925; Zhabynia, Poland (now Ukraine)
- Died: 2 December 2006 (aged 81); Velykyi Hlybochok, Ukraine
- Education: Lviv University

Petro Medvedyk (Ukrainian: Петро Костьович Медведик; 22 October 1925 – 2 December 2006) was a Ukrainian literary critic, folklorist, ethnographer, bibliographer, art historian, local historian. Full member of the Shevchenko Scientific Society (1998), member of the Lviv Commission of the International Association of Ukrainian Bibliographers, and honorary member of the All-Ukrainian Union of Local History (1996).

== Biography ==
Petro Medvedyk was born on 22 October 1925 in Zhabynia, now Zboriv urban hromada, Ternopil Raion, Ternopil Oblast, Ukraine.

In 1952 he graduated from the Faculty of Philology at Lviv University. He worked as a teacher in Velyka Plavucha (Ternopil Raion, 1950–1951), Staryi Tarazh (Kremenets Raion, 1951–1952), Kobzarivka (1952–1958) and Velykyi Hlybochok (both in Ternopil Raion, 1959–1986). At the same time, in 1980–1985, he was a lecturer in Ukrainian folklore and pedagogical practice at the Ternopil Pedagogical Institute.

From 1985, he was a senior researcher at the Solomiya Krushelnytska Memorial Museum in Bila, Ternopil Raion.

== Works ==
He collected and recorded folk songs and stories.

Main books:

- "Literaturna karta Ukrainy" (1959),
- "Vykorystannia kraieznavchoho materialu na urokakh u 8-10 klasakh" (1958),
- "Ivan Franko i literaturna Ternopilshchyna" (1963),
- "Kateryna Rubchakova" (1989),
- "Literaturno-mystetska i naukova Zborivshchyna: Slovnyk biohrafii vyznachnykh liudei" (1998),
- "Moie ridne Opillia: Istorychno-kulturnyi narys s. Zhabynia ta ioho okolyts na Zborivshchyni" (2003).

Collected, organized and published folklore collections:

- "Pisni Ternopilshchyne" (1989, issue 1; 1993, issue 2; co-author S. Stelmashchyk),
- "Yevhan-zilllia: Lehendy ta perekazy Podillia" (1992),
- "Narodni pisni z sela S. Krushelnytskoi" (1993),
- "Kazky Zakhidnoho Podillia: Antolohiia" (1994),
- "Selo Zhabynia na Zborivshchyni: Vesillia. Narodni zvychai ta obriady" (1996),
- Collection of works by Hryhorii Savchynskyi,
- Collection "Vinochok Solomii Krushelnytkoi" (1992),
- "Neopalyma kupyna" collection of folk legends (2007),
- "Solomiia Krushelnytka. Shliakhamy Triumfiv" (2008).

Articles in collections:

- "Marian Krushelnytskyi"
- "Les Kurbas. Spohady suchasnykiv" (both 1969),
- "Les Kurbas. Stati i cpohady (1987)",
- "Teatralna Ternopilshchyna:Bibliohrafichnyi pokazhchyk" (2001).

Indexes:

- "Bibliohrafiia fonozapysiv muzychnykh tvoriv, khudozhnioho chytannia, dramatychnykh vyctav na teksty I. Franka ta za motyvamy ioho zyttia i tvorchosti. 1910–1913" (1977),
- discographies of works by Mykola Lysenko, Kyrylo Stetsenko, and Lesya Ukrainka.

In 1993 and 1998, in "Notes of the National Academy of Sciences. Works of the Musicology Commission" was published Medvedyk's research "Diiachi ukrainskoi muzychnoi kultury: Materialy do bibliohrafichnoho slovnyka". He has written and published many memoirs about Ukrainian writers, composers, actors, directors, and artists.

Medvedyk has more than 800 articles in the Ukrainian Soviet Encyclopedia, Ukrainian Literary Encyclopedia, Encyclopedia of Modern Ukraine, Ternopil Encyclopedic Dictionary, Dictionary of Artists of Ukraine (1973), Shevchenko Dictionary (vol. 12; 1976–77), encyclopedia Art of Ukraine (1995, vol. 1), reference books Artists of Ukraine (1992) and Art of Ukraine (1997). Medvedyk is also the author of indexes and publications on Ukrainian personalities, including Pavlo Zahrebelnyi, Solomiya Krushelnytska, Kateryna Rubchakova, Denys Sichynskyi, and Yakiv Strukhmanchuk.

== Awards ==
- Volodymyr Hnatiuk Prize (1989),
- Pavlo Chubynskyi Prize (1992),
- Brothers Lepky Prize (1999).

== Honoring ==
In 2007, a room-museum named after him was opened in Velykyi Hlybochok.

A regional award was established in Medvedik's honor.

== Sources ==
- Медведик Петро Костянтинович // Українська музична енциклопедія / Гол. редкол. Г. Скрипник, Київ : ІМФЕ НАНУ, 2011, Т. 3 : [Л – М], s. 348–349.
- Медведик Петро Костьович // Шевченківська енциклопедія: — Т.4: М—Па : у 6 т. / Гол. ред. М. Г. Жулинський, Київ : Ін-т літератури ім. Т. Г. Шевченка, 2013, s. 127.
- Петро Медведик: життєписно-бібліографічна студія / Упр. культури Терноп. обл. держ. адмін. Терноп. обл. універс. наук. б-ка; уклад. М. В. Друневич; ред. О. М. Раскіна, Тернопіль : Підруч. і посіб., 2005, 95 s.
