= Zboriv Raion =

Former subdivision of Ternopil Oblast, Ukraine

Zboriv Raion Зборівський район
- Raion
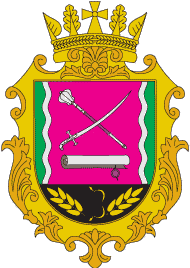
- Coat of arms

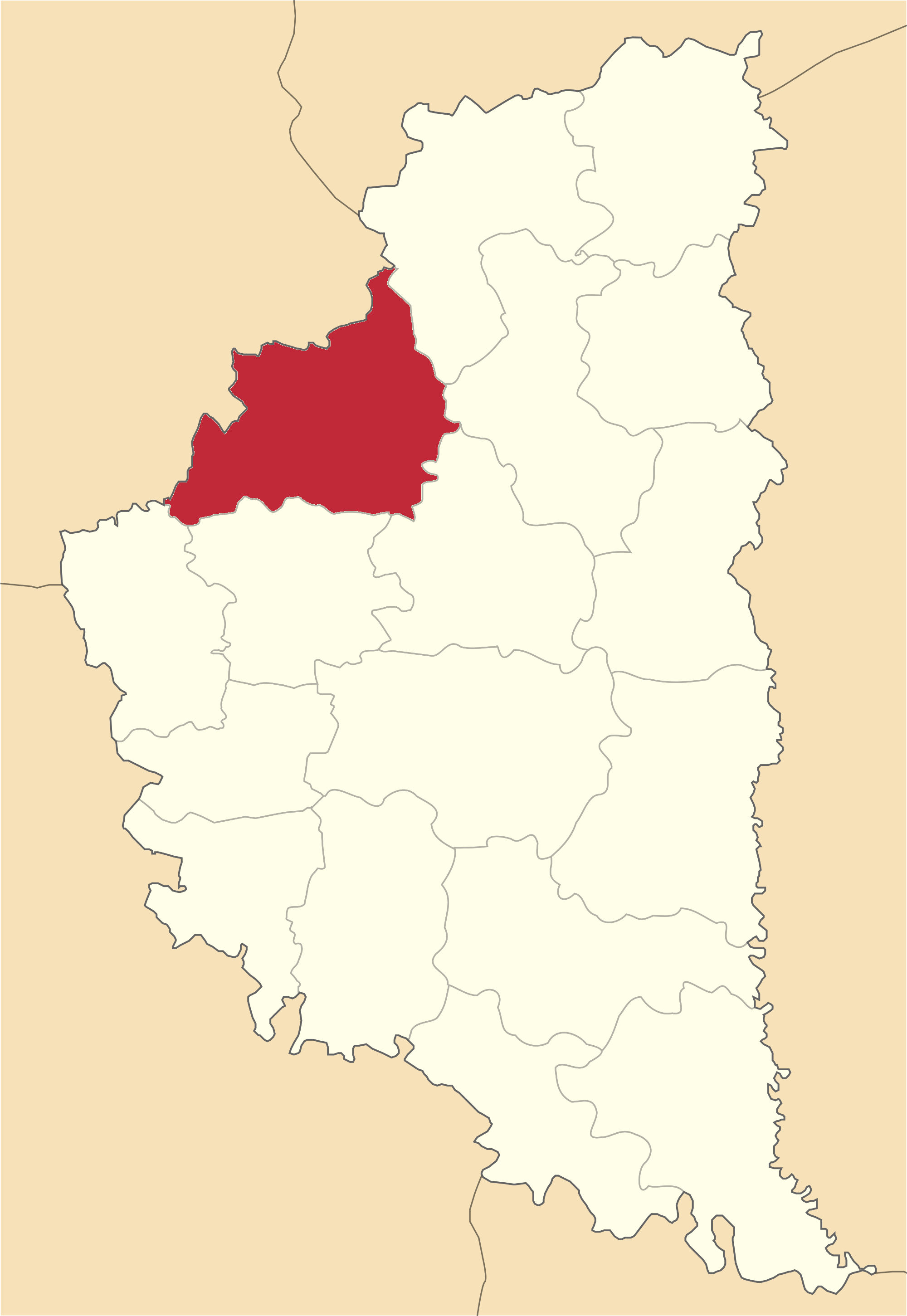
- Coordinates: 49°43′N 25°16′E
- Country: Ukraine
- Oblast: Ternopil Oblast
- Established: 1939
- Disestablished: 18 July 2020
- Admin. center: Zboriv
- Subdivisions: List: — city councils; — settlement councils; — rural councils; Number of localities: — cities; — urban-type settlements; 90 — villages; — rural settlements

Area
  - Total: 0.978 km^{2} (0.378 sq mi)

Population (2020)
  - Total: 39,947
  - Density: 40,800/km^{2} (106,000/sq mi)
- Time zone: UTC+02:00 (EET)
  - Summer (DST): UTC+03:00 (EEST)
- Area code: 380-3540

Zboriv Raion (Ukrainian: Зборівський район) was a raion (district) in Ternopil Oblast in western Ukraine. Its administrative center was Zboriv. The raion was abolished on 18 July 2020 as part of the administrative reform of Ukraine, which reduced the number of raions of Ternopil Oblast to three. The area of Zboriv Raion was merged into Ternopil Raion. The last estimate of the raion population was 39,947 (2020 est.).

At the time of disestablishment, the raion consisted of three hromadas:

- Ozerna rural hromada with the administration in the village of Ozerna;
- Zaliztsi settlement hromada with the administration in the urban-type settlement of Zaliztsi;
- Zboriv urban hromada with the administration in Zboriv.

Part of the raion was merged with the city of Ternopil, into Ternopil urban hromada.

Local government — Zboriv District State Administration.

== See also ==
- Subdivisions of Ukraine
