= Kokutkivtsi =

Rural locality in Ternopil Oblast, Ukraine

Kokutkivtsi Кокутківці
- Location in Ternopil Oblast
- Coordinates: 49°40′28″N 25°23′34″E
- Country: Ukraine
- Oblast: Ternopil Oblast
- Raion: Ternopil Raion
- Hromada: Ozerna rural hromada
- Time zone: UTC+2 (EET)
  - Summer (DST): UTC+3 (EEST)
- Postal code: 47281

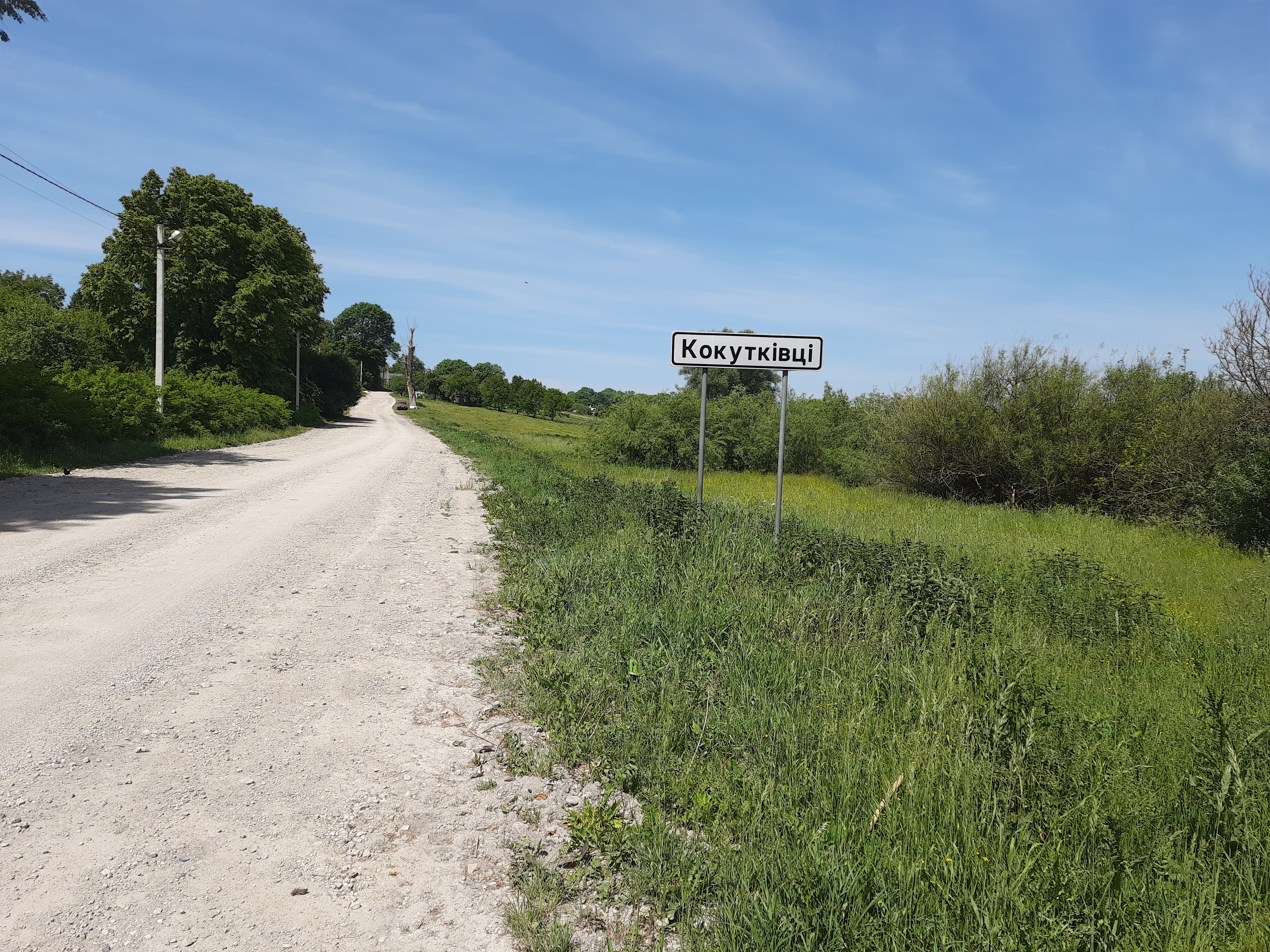
Road sign at the entrance to the village of Kokutkivtsi, Ternopil district, Ternopil region.

Kokutkivtsi (Ukrainian: Кокутківці) is a village in Ozerna rural hromada, Ternopil Raion, Ternopil Oblast, Ukraine.

== History ==
It has village known from the 17th century.

After the liquidation of the Zboriv Raion on 19 July 2020, the village became part of the Ternopil Raion.

== Religion ==
- Church of John the Baptist (1883, wooden).

== Sources ==
- (in Ukrainian) Ясенівка В., Кокутківці // Ternopil Encyclopedic Dictionary: in 4 v. / editorial board: H. Yavorskyi and other, Ternopil: "Zbruch", 2005, V. 2: К—О, S. 135. — ISBN 966-528-199-2.
- "Kokutkowce". Geographical Dictionary of the Kingdom of Poland (in Polish). 4. Warszawa: Kasa im. Józefa Mianowskiego. 1883. p. 256.
