= Domamorych =

Rural locality in Ternopil Oblast, Ukraine

Domamorych Домаморич
- Location in Ternopil Oblast
- Coordinates: 49°33′1″N 25°25′24″E
- Country: Ukraine
- Oblast: Ternopil Oblast
- Raion: Ternopil Raion
- Hromada: Pidhorodnie rural hromada
- Time zone: UTC+2 (EET)
  - Summer (DST): UTC+3 (EEST)
- Postal code: 46003

Domamorych (Ukrainian: Домаморич) is a village in Pidhorodnie rural hromada, Ternopil Raion, Ternopil Oblast, Ukraine.

== History ==
The first written mention of the village was in 1464.

== Religion ==
- Church of the Assumption (1908–1910; brick; rebuilt in 1924, UGCC).

== Sources ==
- (in Ukrainian) Табас Н., Уніят В., Домаморич // Ternopil Encyclopedic Dictionary: in 4 v. / editorial board: H. Yavorskyi and other, Ternopil: "Zbruch", 2004, V. 1: А—Й, S. 520. — ISBN 966-528-197-6.
- "Domamorycz". Geographical Dictionary of the Kingdom of Poland (in Polish). 2. Warszawa: Kasa im. Józefa Mianowskiego. 1881. p. 111.
