= Danylivtsi =

Rural locality in Ternopil Oblast, Ukraine

Danylivtsi Данилівці
- Location in Ternopil Oblast
- Coordinates: 49°39′26″N 25°18′12″E
- Country: Ukraine
- Oblast: Ternopil Oblast
- Raion: Ternopil Raion
- Hromada: Ozerna rural hromada
- Time zone: UTC+2 (EET)
  - Summer (DST): UTC+3 (EEST)
- Postal code: 47260

Danylivtsi (Ukrainian: Данилівці) is a village in Ozerna rural hromada, Ternopil Raion, Ternopil Oblast, Ukraine.

== History ==
The first written mention of the village was in 1589.

After the liquidation of the Zboriv Raion on 19 July 2020, the village became part of the Ternopil Raion.

== Religion ==
- St. Michael church (1715; wooden, reconstructed in the 1930s).

== Sources ==
- (in Ukrainian) Уніят В., Данилівці // Ternopil Encyclopedic Dictionary: in 4 v. / editorial board: H. Yavorskyi and other, Ternopil: "Zbruch", 2004, V. 1: А—Й, S. 462. — ISBN 966-528-197-6.
- "Daniłowce, wieś, pow. złoczowski". Geographical Dictionary of the Kingdom of Poland (in Polish). 1. Warszawa: Kasa im. Józefa Mianowskiego. 1880. p. 900.
