= Saint John the Apostle Church, Skoryky =

Ukrainian Orthodox church in Skoryky, Ukraine

Saint John the Apostle Church
- Церква Іоанна Богослова
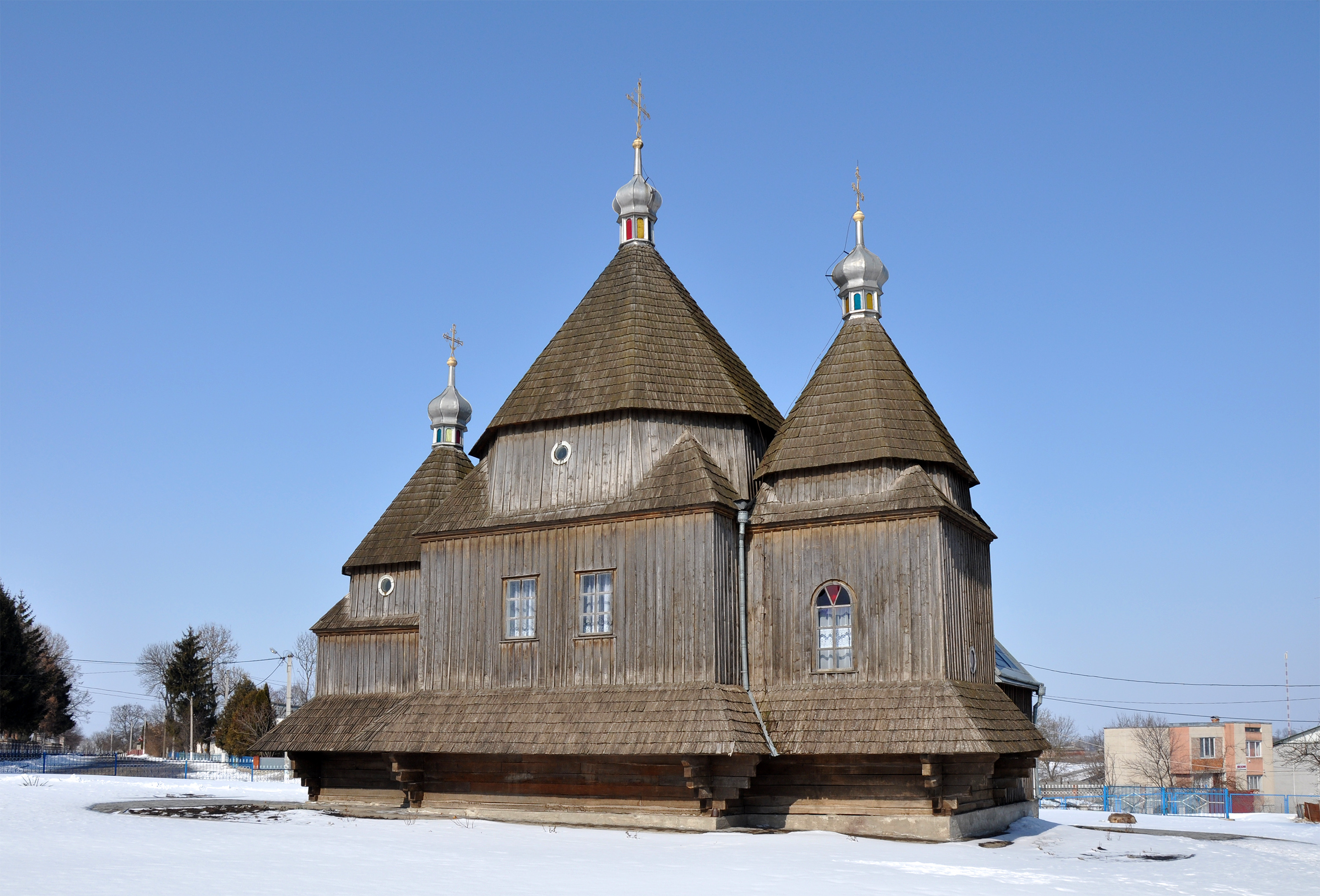

- Location within Ternopil Oblast

Religion
- Affiliation: Orthodox Church of Ukraine

Location
- Location: Skoryky
- Coordinates: 49°35′49″N 26°08′33″E

Immovable Monument of National Significance of Ukraine
- Official name: Церква (дер.) (Church (wooden))
- Type: Architecture
- Reference no.: 190058

Saint John the Apostle Church (Ukrainian: Церква Іоанна Богослова) is a church in Skoryky, Ternopil Raion, Ternopil Oblast, Ukraine. It is an architectural monument of national significance dating from the 17th to the early 18th centuries. The wooden church belongs to the archaic regional type and is one of the most characteristic examples of the Podillia school of folk architecture.

It is a three-section, three-part, three-roofed (three-gabled) structure consisting of a larger nave and identical smaller altar and narthex. The lower part of the unclad log walls is protected by a wide eave on curved brackets. Above it rise log structures that transition into octagons, which support octagonal tent roofs with finials, with the middle roof above the nave being significantly higher, forming a distinctive silhouette.

The interior of the narthex has a two-tiered structure with choirs, connected to the nave by a figured arch-cutout. The church has preserved a six-tiered carved gilded iconostasis of the 18th century with a dynamic composition containing icons in the style of Baroque painting. The church was restored in 1989–1991, and the iconostasis in 1999.
