= Seredyntsi, Ternopil Oblast =

Rural locality in Ternopil Oblast, Ukraine

Seredyntsi Серединці
- Location in Ternopil Oblast
- Coordinates: 49°39′6″N 25°25′55″E
- Country: Ukraine
- Oblast: Ternopil Oblast
- Raion: Ternopil Raion
- Hromada: Ozerna rural hromada
- Time zone: UTC+2 (EET)
  - Summer (DST): UTC+3 (EEST)
- Postal code: 47281

Seredyntsi (Ukrainian: Серединці) is a village in Ozerna rural hromada, Ternopil Raion, Ternopil Oblast, Ukraine.

== History ==
The village has been known from the 18th century.

After the liquidation of the Zboriv Raion on 19 July 2020, the village became part of the Ternopil Raion.

== Religion ==
- St. Michael church (1912; rebuilt from a Roman Catholic church in the 1990s).

== Sources ==
- (in Ukrainian) Ханас Вас., Серединці // Ternopil Encyclopedic Dictionary: in 4 v. / editorial board: H. Yavorskyi and other, Ternopil: "Zbruch", 2008, V. 3: П—Я, S. 250. — ISBN 978-966-528-279-2.
- "Seredyńce". Geographical Dictionary of the Kingdom of Poland (in Polish). 10. Warszawa: Kasa im. Józefa Mianowskiego. 1889. p. 441.
