= Zaboiky =

Rural locality in Ternopil Oblast, Ukraine

Zaboiky Забойки
- Location in Ternopil Oblast
- Coordinates: 49°31′49″N 25°27′14″E
- Country: Ukraine
- Oblast: Ternopil Oblast
- Raion: Ternopil Raion
- Hromada: Pidhorodnie rural hromada
- Time zone: UTC+2 (EET)
  - Summer (DST): UTC+3 (EEST)
- Postal code: 47721

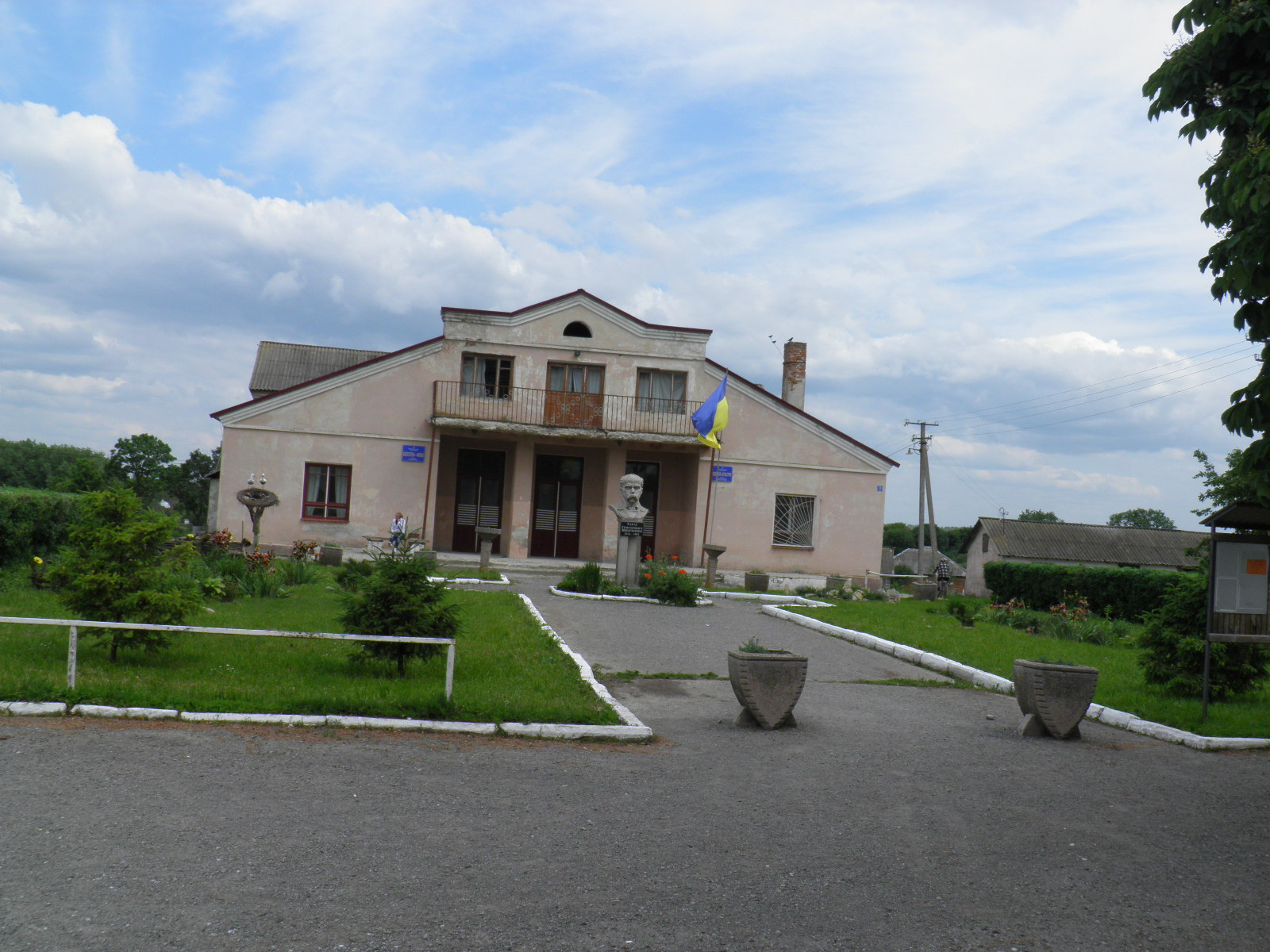
House of Culture, book collection and bust of Taras Shevchenko in Zabojki, 2012

Zaboiky (Ukrainian: Забойки) is a village in Pidhorodnie rural hromada, Ternopil Raion, Ternopil Oblast, Ukraine.

== History ==
The first written mention of the village was in 1564.

== Religion ==
- Saints Cosmas and Demian church (1897, brick, UGCC),
- Saint Volodymyr church (1992, brick, OCU),
- church (1893, brick, currently not functioning, RCC).

== Sources ==
- (in Ukrainian) Уніят В., Забойки // Ternopil Encyclopedic Dictionary: in 4 v. / editorial board: H. Yavorskyi and other, Ternopil: "Zbruch", 2004, V. 1: А—Й, S. 588. — ISBN 966-528-197-6.
- "Zabójki". Geographical Dictionary of the Kingdom of Poland (in Polish). 14. Warszawa: Kasa im. Józefa Mianowskiego. 1895. p. 193.
