= Nesterivtsi, Ternopil Oblast =

Rural locality in Ternopil Oblast, Ukraine

Nesterivtsi Нестерівці
- Location in Ternopil Oblast
- Coordinates: 49°41′56″N 25°22′10″E
- Country: Ukraine
- Oblast: Ternopil Oblast
- Raion: Ternopil Raion
- Hromada: Ozerna rural hromada
- Time zone: UTC+2 (EET)
  - Summer (DST): UTC+3 (EEST)
- Postal code: 47281

Nesterivtsi (Ukrainian: Нестерівці) is a village in Ozerna rural hromada, Ternopil Raion, Ternopil Oblast, Ukraine.

== History ==
The village has been known from the 16th century.

After the liquidation of the Zboriv Raion on 19 July 2020, the village became part of the Ternopil Raion.

== Religion ==
- St. Luke church (1785).

== Sources ==
- (in Ukrainian) Уніят В., Нестерівці // Ternopil Encyclopedic Dictionary: in 4 v. / editorial board: H. Yavorskyi and other, Ternopil: "Zbruch", 2005, V. 2: К—О, S. 624. — ISBN 966-528-199-2.
- "Nesterowce (pow. złoczowski)". Geographical Dictionary of the Kingdom of Poland (in Polish). 6. Warszawa: Kasa im. Józefa Mianowskiego. 1885. p. 958.
