= Ostashivtsi =

Rural locality in Ternopil Oblast, Ukraine

Ostashivtsi Осташівці
- Location in Ternopil Oblast
- Coordinates: 49°39′41″N 25°19′33″E
- Country: Ukraine
- Oblast: Ternopil Oblast
- Raion: Ternopil Raion
- Hromada: Ozerna rural hromada
- Time zone: UTC+2 (EET)
  - Summer (DST): UTC+3 (EEST)
- Postal code: 47260

Ostashivtsi (Ukrainian: Осташівці) is a village in Ozerna rural hromada, Ternopil Raion, Ternopil Oblast, Ukraine.

== History ==
The first written mention of the village was in 1546.

After the liquidation of the Zboriv Raion on 19 July 2020, the village became part of the Ternopil Raion.

== Religion ==
- Church of the Presentation of the Blessed Virgin Mary (1911, rebuilt in 1990).

== Sources ==
- (in Ukrainian) Уніят В., Осташівці // Ternopil Encyclopedic Dictionary: in 4 v. / editorial board: H. Yavorskyi and other, Ternopil: "Zbruch", 2005, V. 2: К—О, S. 695. — ISBN 966-528-199-2.
- "Ostaszowce, rus. Ostasziwci". Geographical Dictionary of the Kingdom of Poland (in Polish). 1. Warszawa: Kasa im. Józefa Mianowskiego. 1880. p. 664.
