= Drahanivka, Ternopil Oblast =

Rural locality in Ternopil Oblast, Ukraine

Drahanivka Драганівка
- Location in Ternopil Oblast
- Coordinates: 49°30′9″N 25°31′39″E
- Country: Ukraine
- Oblast: Ternopil Oblast
- Raion: Ternopil Raion
- Hromada: Pidhorodnie rural hromada
- Time zone: UTC+2 (EET)
  - Summer (DST): UTC+3 (EEST)
- Postal code: 47723

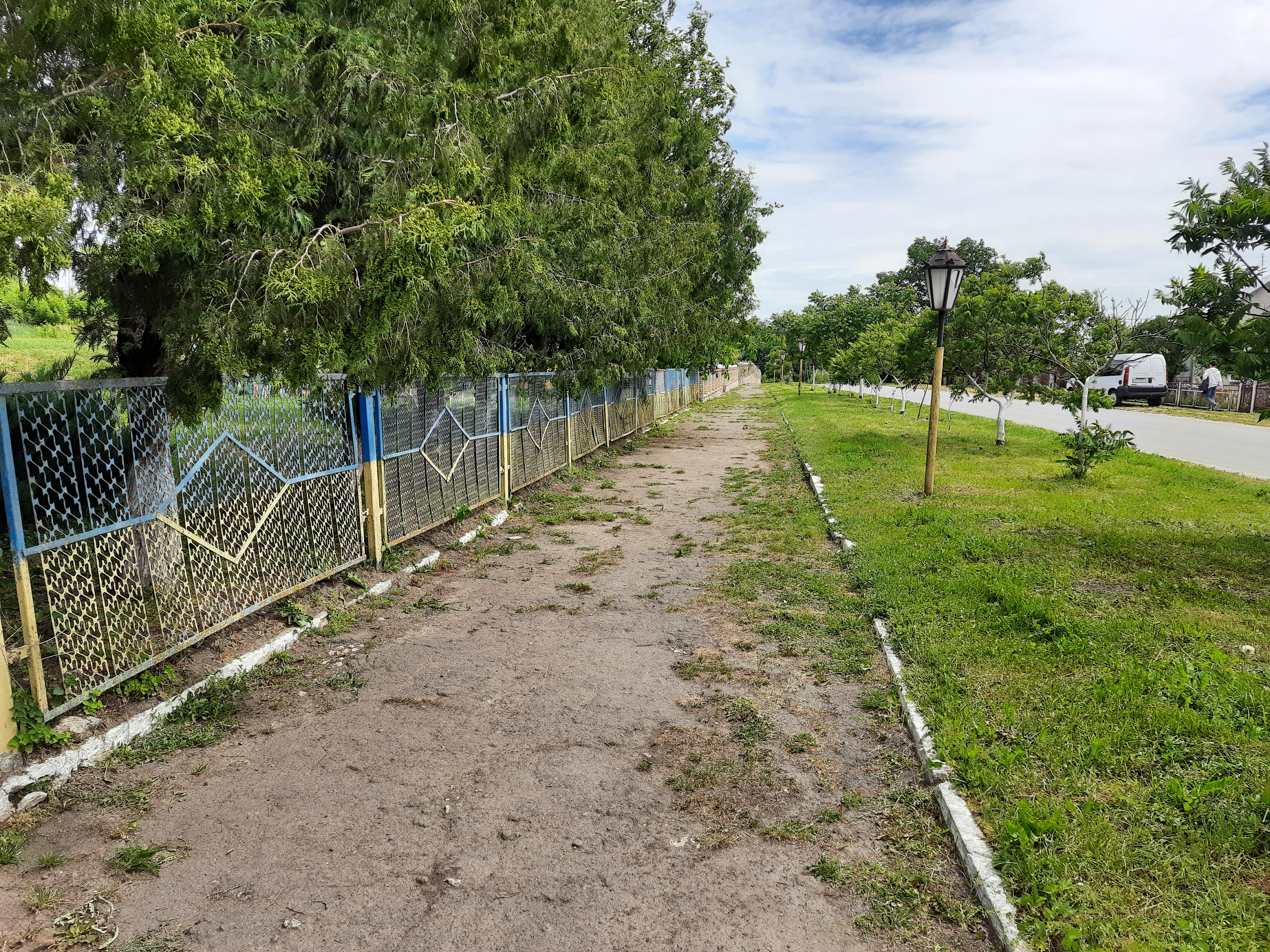

Drahanivka (Ukrainian: Драганівка) is a village in Pidhorodnie rural hromada, Ternopil Raion, Ternopil Oblast, Ukraine.

== History ==
The first written mention of the village was in 1501.

== Religion ==
- Holy Trinity church (1832–1849, brick; UGCC and OCU),
- Our Lady of the Snows church (1848–1858, brick, RCC),
- Monastery (2000s, in a private house).

== Notable residents ==
The village was visited by Metropolitan Yosyf Slipyi of the UGCC (then a seminarian).

== Sources ==
- "Draganówka". Geographical Dictionary of the Kingdom of Poland (in Polish). 2. Warszawa: Kasa im. Józefa Mianowskiego. 1881. p. 138.
