= Dovzhanka, Ternopil Oblast =

Rural locality in Ternopil Oblast, Ukraine

Dovzhanka Довжанка
- Location in Ternopil Oblast Dovzhanka (Ukraine)
- Coordinates: 49°33′55″N 25°28′15″E
- Country: Ukraine
- Oblast: Ternopil Oblast
- Raion: Ternopil Raion
- Hromada: Pidhorodnie rural hromada
- Time zone: UTC+2 (EET)
  - Summer (DST): UTC+3 (EEST)
- Postal code: 47708

Dovzhanka (Ukrainian: Довжанка) is a village in Pidhorodnie rural hromada, Ternopil Raion, Ternopil Oblast, Ukraine.

== History ==
The first written mention of the village was in 1464.

== Religion ==
- St. John the Baptist church (1795, brick, restored in 1996).

== Notable residents ==
- Sofia Okunevska (1865–1926), Ukrainian physician, educator, feminist, and scholar. She was the first female Doctor of Medicine and the first female physician in Austria-Hungary.

In the village, Petro Bilynskyi (1893–1896) and Ostap Nyzhankivskyi (1896–1897) pastored.

== Sources ==
- (in Ukrainian) Уніят В., Довжанка // Ternopil Encyclopedic Dictionary: in 4 v. / editorial board: H. Yavorskyi and other, Ternopil: "Zbruch", 2004, V. 1: А—Й, S. 516. — ISBN 966-528-197-6.
- "Dołżanka". Geographical Dictionary of the Kingdom of Poland (in Polish). 2. Warszawa: Kasa im. Józefa Mianowskiego. 1881. p. 109—110.
