= Pochapyntsi, Ternopil Oblast =

Rural locality in Ternopil Oblast, Ukraine

Pochapyntsi Почапинці
- Location in Ternopil Oblast
- Coordinates: 49°30′50″N 25°29′38″E
- Country: Ukraine
- Oblast: Ternopil Oblast
- Raion: Ternopil Raion
- Hromada: Pidhorodnie rural hromada
- Time zone: UTC+2 (EET)
  - Summer (DST): UTC+3 (EEST)
- Postal code: 47721

Pochapyntsi (Ukrainian: Почапинці) is a village in Pidhorodnie rural hromada, Ternopil Raion, Ternopil Oblast, Ukraine.

== History ==
The first written mention of the village was in 1472.

== Religion ==
- Saint Onufriy church (1991, brick; built on the site of a Roman Catholic church).

== Sources ==
- (in Ukrainian) Мельничук Б., Уніят В., Почапинці // Ternopil Encyclopedic Dictionary: in 4 v. / editorial board: H. Yavorskyi and other, Ternopil: "Zbruch", 2008, V. 3: П—Я, S. 130. — ISBN 978-966-528-279-2.
- "Poczapińce, wś, pow. tarnopolski". Geographical Dictionary of the Kingdom of Poland (in Polish). 8. Warszawa: Kasa im. Józefa Mianowskiego. 1887. p. 353.
