= Tsebriv =

Rural locality in Ternopil Oblast, Ukraine

Tsebriv Цебрів
- Location in Ternopil Oblast
- Coordinates: 49°37′58″N 25°24′48″E
- Country: Ukraine
- Oblast: Ternopil Oblast
- Raion: Ternopil Raion
- Hromada: Ozerna rural hromada
- Time zone: UTC+2 (EET)
  - Summer (DST): UTC+3 (EEST)
- Postal code: 47265

Tsebriv (Ukrainian: Цебрів) is a village in Ozerna rural hromada, Ternopil Raion, Ternopil Oblast, Ukraine.

== History ==
The first written mention of the village was in 1421.

After the liquidation of the Zboriv Raion on 19 July 2020, the village became part of the Ternopil Raion.

== Religion ==
- Two churches of the Intercession (1892, wooden, brought from Zakarpattia; 2008, brick).

== Notable residents ==
The writer Ivanna Blazhkevych visited the village.

== Sources ==
- (in Ukrainian) Ковальчук О., Новосядла Н., Цебрів // Ternopil Encyclopedic Dictionary: in 4 v. / editorial board: H. Yavorskyi and other, Ternopil: "Zbruch", 2008, V. 3: П—Я, S. 567. — ISBN 978-966-528-279-2.
- "Cebrów". Geographical Dictionary of the Kingdom of Poland (in Polish). 1. Warszawa: Kasa im. Józefa Mianowskiego. 1880. p. 528.
