= Bilkivtsi =

Rural locality in Ternopil Oblast, Ukraine

Bilkivtsi Білківці
- Location in Ternopil Oblast
- Coordinates: 49°41′25″N 25°18′25″E
- Country: Ukraine
- Oblast: Ternopil Oblast
- Raion: Ternopil Raion
- Hromada: Ozerna rural hromada
- Time zone: UTC+2 (EET)
  - Summer (DST): UTC+3 (EEST)
- Postal code: 47260

Bilkivtsi (Ukrainian: Білківці) is a village in Ozerna rural hromada, Ternopil Raion, Ternopil Oblast, Ukraine.

== History ==
The first written mention of the village was in 1532.

After the liquidation of the Zboriv Raion on 19 July 2020, the village became part of the Ternopil Raion.

== Religion ==
- St. Nicholas church (1844, destroyed during World War I, rebuilt in 1929).

== Sources ==
- (in Ukrainian) Ханас В., Шилівська М., Білківці // Ternopil Encyclopedic Dictionary: in 4 v. / editorial board: H. Yavorskyi and other, Ternopil: "Zbruch", 2004, V. 1: А—Й, S. 133—134. — ISBN 966-528-197-6.
- "Białkowce (pow. złoczowski)". Geographical Dictionary of the Kingdom of Poland (in Polish). 1. Warszawa: Kasa im. Józefa Mianowskiego. 1880. p. 187.
