= Vysypivtsi =

Rural locality in Ternopil Oblast, Ukraine

Vysypivtsi Висипівці
- Location in Ternopil Oblast
- Coordinates: 49°39′57″N 25°24′50″E
- Country: Ukraine
- Oblast: Ternopil Oblast
- Raion: Ternopil Raion
- Hromada: Ozerna rural hromada
- Time zone: UTC+2 (EET)
  - Summer (DST): UTC+3 (EEST)
- Postal code: 47281

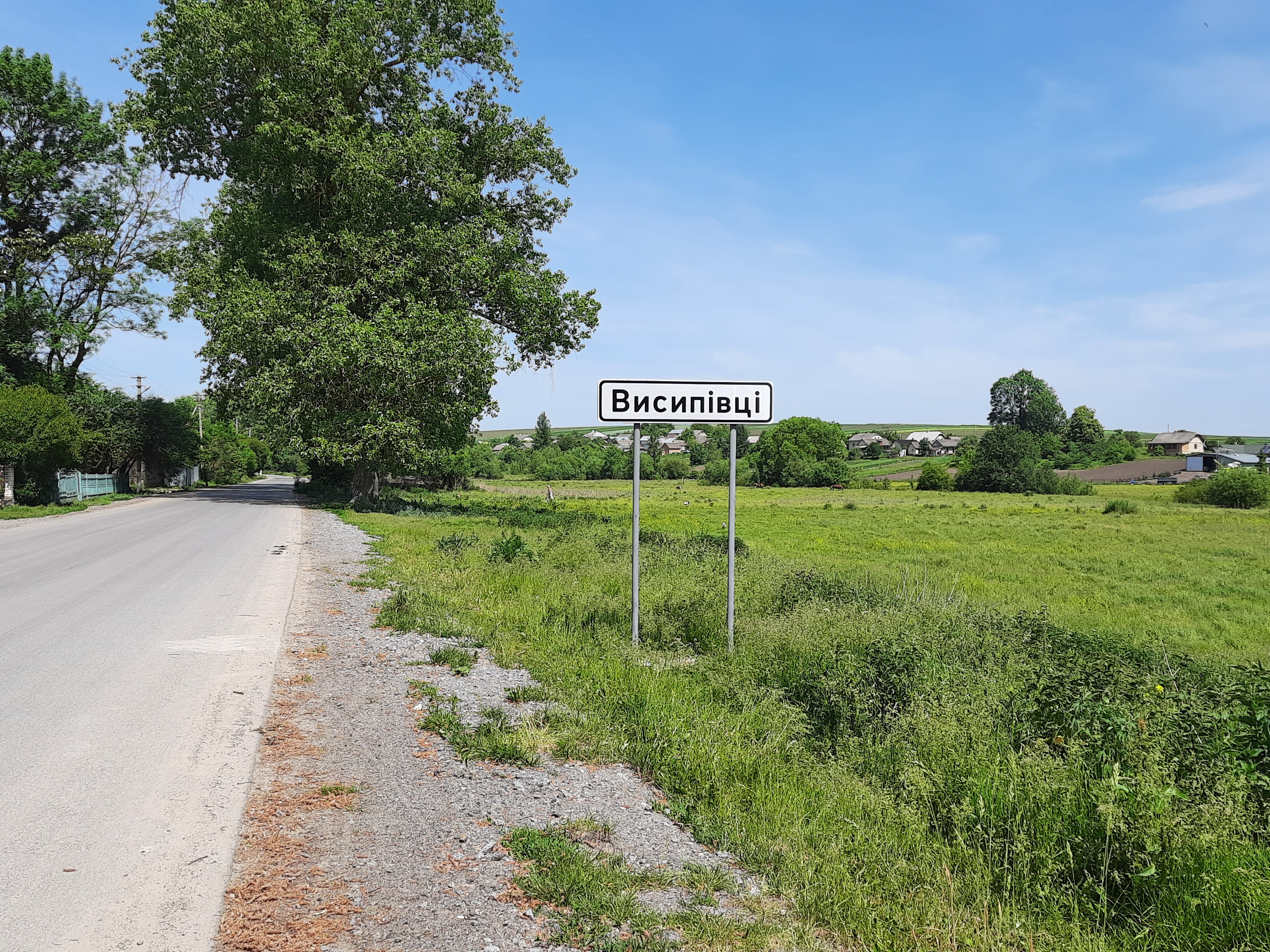
Road sign at the entrance to the village of Vysypivtsi, Chortkiv district, Ternopil region

Vysypivtsi (Ukrainian: Висипівці) is a village in Ozerna rural hromada, Ternopil Raion, Ternopil Oblast, Ukraine.

== History ==
The village is known from the 17th century.

After the liquidation of the Zboriv Raion on 19 July 2020, the village became part of the Ternopil Raion.

== Religion ==
- Saint Paraskeva church (1867, brick).

== Sources ==
- "Isypowce". Geographical Dictionary of the Kingdom of Poland (in Polish). 3. Warszawa: Kasa im. Józefa Mianowskiego. 1882. p. 307.
