= Pidhorodnie rural hromada =

Rural hromada in Ternopil Oblast, Ukraine

- hromada
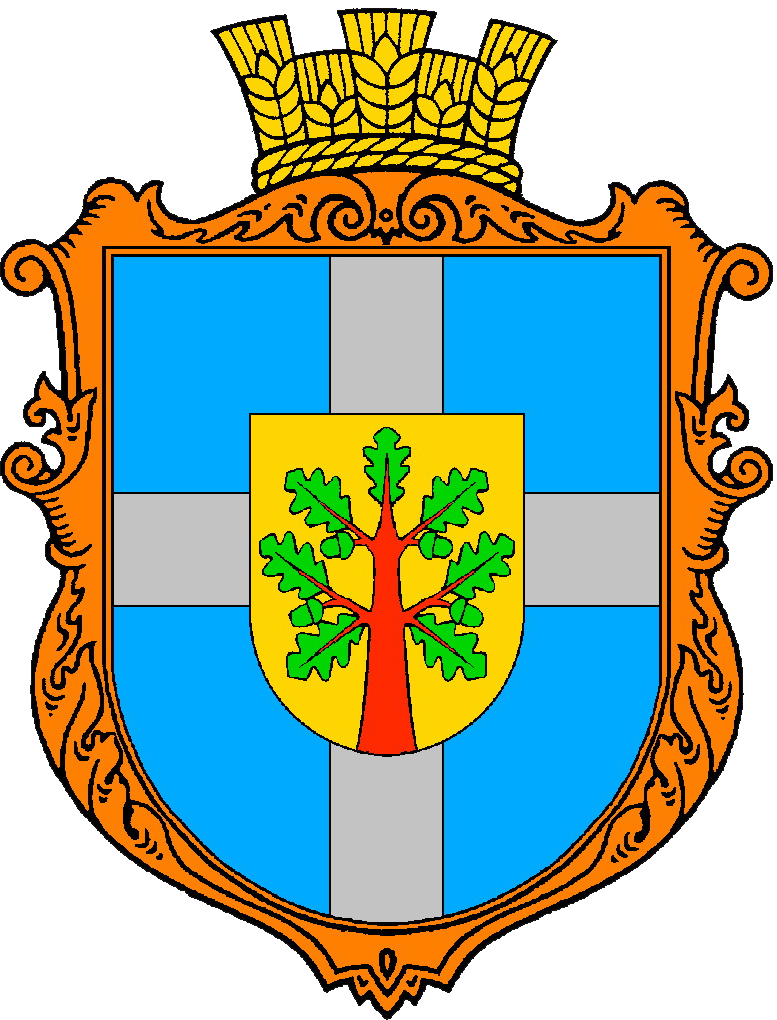
- Seal

- Location within Ternopil Oblast Location within Ukraine
- Coordinates: 49°31′59″N 25°31′35″E
- Country: Ukraine
- Oblast: Ternopil Oblast
- Raion: Ternopil Raion
- Administrative center: Pidhorodnie

Government
  - Hromada head: Serhii Chaprak

Area
  - Total: 130.6 km^{2} (50.4 sq mi)

Population (2022)
  - Total: 7,278
- Villages: 7
- Website: pidgorodnyanska-gromada.gov.ua

Pidhorodnie rural territorial hromada (Ukrainian: Підгороднянська територіальна громада, romanized: Pidhorodnianska silska terytorialna hromada) is a hromada in Ukraine, in Ternopil Raion of Ternopil Oblast. The administrative center is the village of Pidhorodnie. Its population is 7,278 (2022 estimate) Founded on 8 November 2018.

== Settlements ==
The hromada consists of 7 villages:

- Velykyi Khodachkiv
- Dovzhanka
- Domamorych
- Drahanivka
- Zaboiky
- Pidhorodnie
- Pochapyntsi
