= Battle of Ozerna =

1655 battle of the Russo-Polish War (1654–67)

- Part of Russo-Polish War (1654–1667)
Date	November 10–12, 1655 O.S. 20–22 November 1655 N.S.
Location	Ozerna near Zboriv, Ruthenia (now in Ukraine)
Result	Disputed

Belligerents
Poland-Lithuania; Crimean Khanate	Russian Tsardom; Cossack Hetmanate

Commanders and leaders
Mehmed IV Giray; Piotr Potocki	Vasili Buturlin; Bohdan Khmelnytsky

The Battle of Ozerna or Battle of Jezierna was fought on 20–22 November (O.S. 10–12 November) 1655 near Ozerna (then in Ruthenian Voivodeship of the Crown of Poland, now part of Ukraine) between the forces of the Polish-Tatar coalition and Ukrainian-Russian troops. The battle ended with a success for the Polish–Lithuanian Commonwealth. As a result of the Polish Lithuanian victory, Bohdan Khmelnytsky was forced to recognize the formal suzerainty of the Polish-Lithuanian Commonwealth over Russia. Another source calls the battle a victory for Russia.

== External sources ==
- Грушевський М. Історія України-Руси. — Том IX. — Розділ X. — С. 9–11.
- Гуцал П. Озернянська угода / Тернопільський енциклопедичний словник : у 4 т. / редкол.: Г. Яворський та ін. — Тернопіль : Видавничо-поліграфічний комбінат «Збруч», 2005. — Т. 2 : К — О. — С. 658. — ISBN 966-528-199-2.
- Мицик Ю. А., Бажан О. Г., Власов В. С. Перебіг воєнних дій проти Речі Посполитої в 1654—1655 pp. [Архівовано 8 травня 2013 у Wayback Machine.] // Історія України. Навчальний посібник. — К. : ВД «Києво-Могилянська академія», 2008.
- Podhorodecki L. Chanat Krymski w XV—XVIII wieku. — Warszawa, 1987. — S. 192–193.
