= Ozerna, Ternopil Oblast =

Rural locality in Ternopil Oblast, Ukraine

Ozerna Озерна
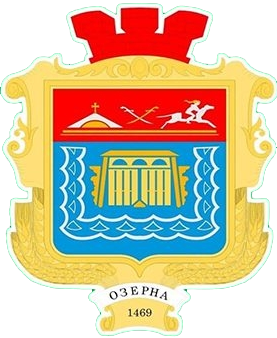
- Coat of arms

- Location in Ternopil Oblast
- Coordinates: 49°37′33″N 25°20′23″E
- Country: Ukraine
- Oblast: Ternopil Oblast
- Raion: Ternopil Raion
- Hromada: Ozerna rural hromada
- Time zone: UTC+2 (EET)
  - Summer (DST): UTC+3 (EEST)
- Postal code: 47264

Ozerna (Ukrainian: Озерна) is a village in Ozerna rural hromada, Ternopil Raion, Ternopil Oblast, Ukraine.

== History ==
The first written mention of the village was in 1469.

In 1648, Bohdan Khmelnytskyi's troops passed through Ozerna. In November 1655, a two-day battle took place near the village between the army of Bohdan Khmelnytskyi and the Crimean Khan Mehmed IV Giray, which resulted in the Ozerna Agreement. In 1667, Turkish troops looted and burned Ozerna, and the inhabitants were taken prisoner.

On 18 September 1939 Red Army units captured Ozerna from Second Polish Republic, as a result of which the village was annexed into the Soviet Union as part of the Ukrainian SSR.

After the liquidation of the Zboriv Raion on 19 July 2020, the village became part of the Ternopil Raion.

== Religion ==
- Holy Trinity church (1908, brick, UGCC),
- Holy Eucharist church (UGCC),
- Roman Catholic church (1864).

== Monuments ==
- Ozerna Castle

== Sources ==
- Р. В. Бідула Озерна // Encyclopedia of Modern Ukraine [Електронний ресурс] / Редкол. : І. М. Дзюба, А. І. Жуковський, М. Г. Железняк [та ін.]; НАН України, НТШ. — К. : Інститут енциклопедичних досліджень НАН України, 2022.
- (in Ukrainian) Мельничук Б., Редчук А., Уніят В., Озерна // Ternopil Encyclopedic Dictionary: in 4 v. / editorial board: H. Yavorskyi and other, Ternopil: "Zbruch", 2005, V. 2: К—О, S. 657-658. — ISBN 966-528-199-2.
- "Jezierna, miasteczko w pow. złoczowskim". Geographical Dictionary of the Kingdom of Poland (in Polish). 3. Warszawa: Kasa im. Józefa Mianowskiego. 1882. p. 570.
- "Kąty 9.) grupa domów w Jeziernej". Geographical Dictionary of the Kingdom of Poland (in Polish). 3. Warszawa: Kasa im. Józefa Mianowskiego. 1882. p. 947.
