= Ozerna rural hromada =

Rural hromada in Ternopil Oblast, Ukraine

Ozerna rural hromada Озернянська сільська громада
- hromada
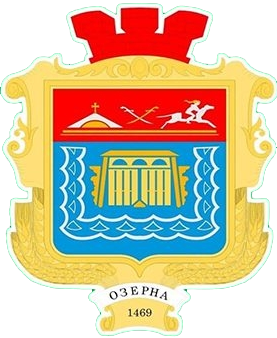
- Seal

- Location within Ternopil Oblast Location within Ukraine
- Coordinates: 49°37′33″N 25°20′23″E
- Country: Ukraine
- Oblast: Ternopil Oblast
- Raion: Ternopil Raion
- Administrative center: Ozerna

Area
  - Total: 126.8 km^{2} (49.0 sq mi)

Population (2022)
  - Total: 6,980
- Villages: 13
- Website: ozerna-rada.gov.ua

Ozerna rural territorial hromada (Ukrainian: Озернянська територіальна громада, romanized: Ozernianska silska terytorialna hromada) is a hromada in Ukraine, in Ternopil Raion of Ternopil Oblast. The administrative center is the village of Ozerna. Its population is 6,980 (2022 estimate) Founded on 12 August 2015.

== Settlements ==
The hromada consists of 13 villages:

- Bilkivtsi
- Bohdanivka
- Vysypivtsi
- Vorobiivka
- Danylivtsi
- Kokutkivtsi
- Nesterivtsi
- Ozerna
- Ostashivtsi
- Seredyntsi
- Syrovary
- Tsebriv
- Yatskivtsi
