= Skoryky, Ternopil Oblast =

Rural locality in Ternopil Oblast, Ukraine

Skoryky Скорики
- Village
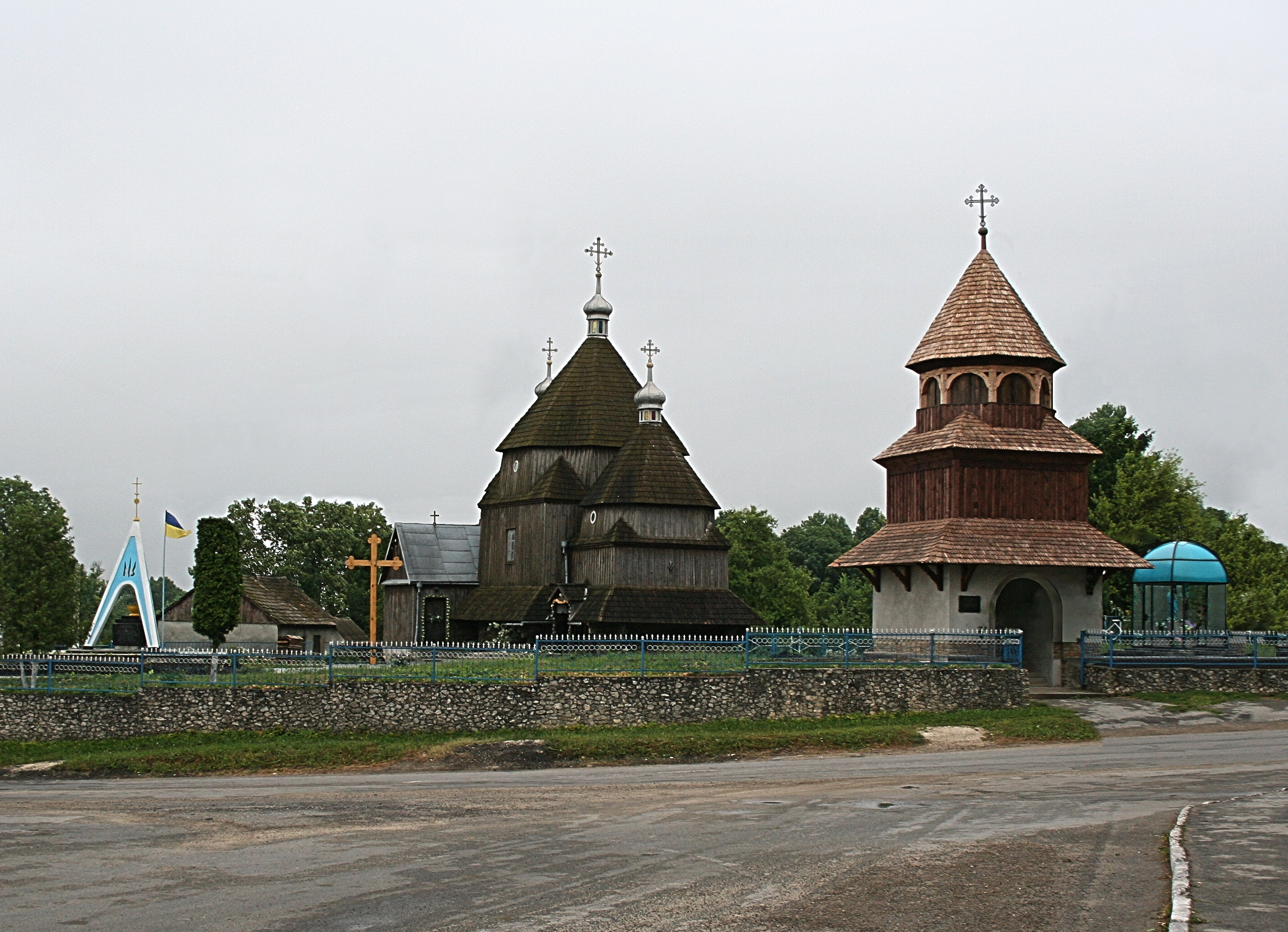
- Wooden church of St. John the Evangelist
- Interactive map of Skoryky
- Coordinates: 49°35′53″N 26°08′42″E
- Country: Ukraine
- Oblast: Ternopil Oblast
- Raion: Ternopil Raion
- Established: 1560

Population (2007)
  - Total: 603

Skoryky (Ukrainian: Скорики, Polish: Skoryki) is a village in Ternopil Raion of Ternopil Oblast in western Ukraine. It hosts the administration of Skoryky rural hromada, one of the hromadas of Ukraine. As of 2007 the population consisted of 603 people.

Until 18 July 2020, Skoryky belonged to Pidvolochysk Raion. The raion was abolished in July 2020 as part of the administrative reform of Ukraine, which reduced the number of raions of Ternopil Oblast to three. The area of Pidvolochysk Raion was merged into Ternopil Raion.

== Religion ==
- St. John the Apostle church (17th century, wooden, restored in 1991; murals by artist V. Kupetskyi; architectural monument of national importance)
- St. John the Theologian church (2003, Ukrainian Greek Catholic Church).
