= Pidhorodnie, Ternopil Oblast =

Village in Ternopil Oblast, Ukraine

Pidhorodnie Підгороднє
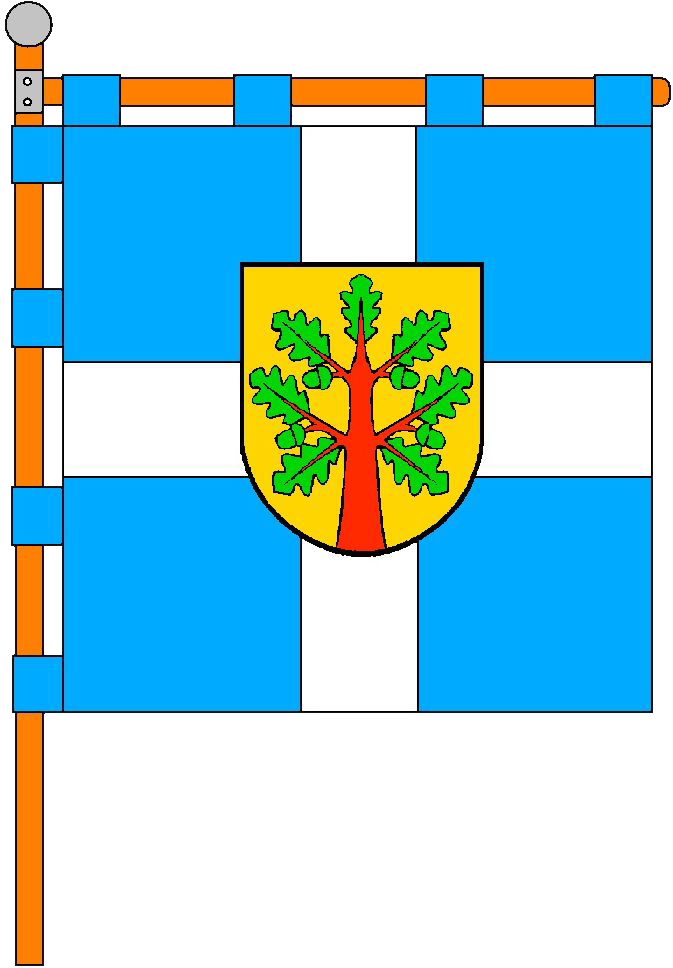
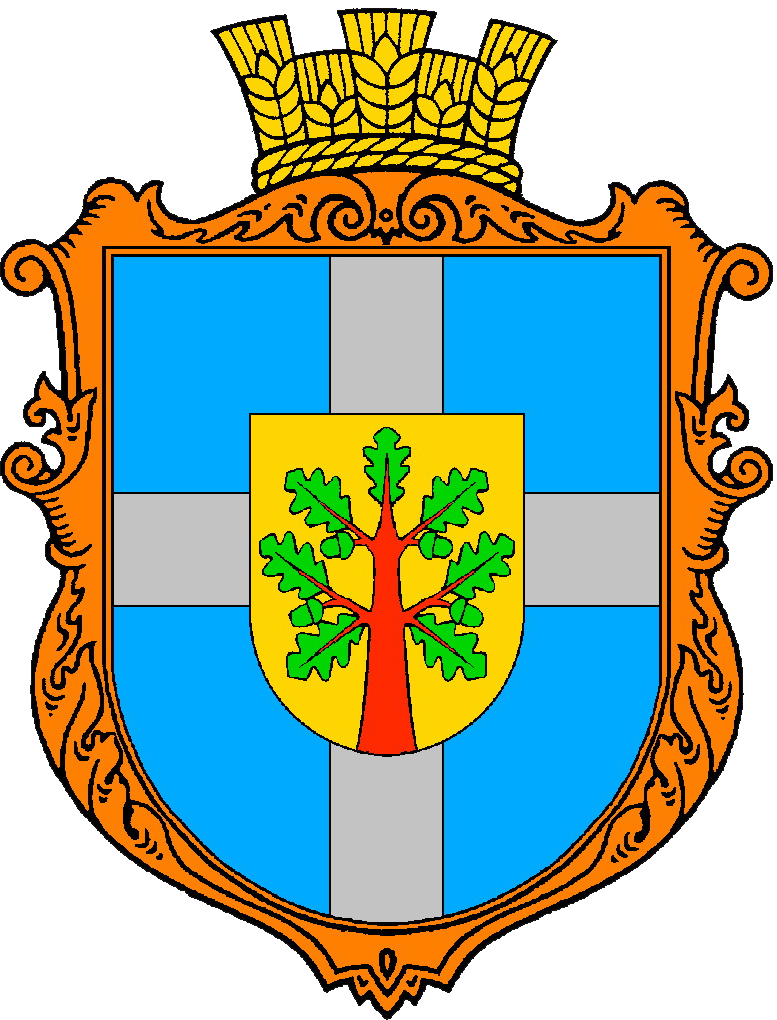
- Flag Coat of arms

- Location in Ternopil Oblast
- Coordinates: 49°31′59″N 25°31′35″E
- Country: Ukraine
- Oblast: Ternopil Oblast
- Raion: Ternopil Raion
- Hromada: Pidhorodnie rural hromada
- Postal code: 47721

Pidhorodnie (Ukrainian: Підгороднє; until 1939 – Yanivka, then – Ivanivka, 1962–2024 – Pidhorodne) is a village in Pidhorodnie rural hromada, Ternopil Raion, Ternopil Oblast, Ukraine.

== History ==
The first possible written mention is on 28 June 1458.

The village was renamed from Pidhorodne to Pidhorodnie on 19 September 2024.

== Religion ==
- Church of the Nativity of the Blessed Virgin Mary (1908, UGCC)
- Church of the Intercession (1997, architect Mykhailo Netribiak, OCU)
