= Yatskivtsi =

Rural locality in Ternopil Oblast, Ukraine

Yatskivtsi Яцківці
- Location in Ternopil Oblast
- Coordinates: 49°41′59″N 25°16′44″E
- Country: Ukraine
- Oblast: Ternopil Oblast
- Raion: Ternopil Raion
- Hromada: Ozerna rural hromada
- Time zone: UTC+2 (EET)
  - Summer (DST): UTC+3 (EEST)
- Postal code: 47260

Yatskivtsi (Ukrainian: Яцківці) is a village in Ozerna rural hromada, Ternopil Raion, Ternopil Oblast, Ukraine.

== History ==
The first written mention of the village was in 1598.

After the liquidation of the Zboriv Raion on 19 July 2020, the village became part of the Ternopil Raion.

== Religion ==
- Saints Peter and Paul church (1991, brick).

== Sources ==
- (in Ukrainian) Мельничук Б., Яцківці // Ternopil Encyclopedic Dictionary: in 4 v. / editorial board: H. Yavorskyi and other, Ternopil: "Zbruch", 2008, V. 3: П—Я, S. 697. — ISBN 978-966-528-279-2.
- "Jackowce (pow. złoczowski)". Geographical Dictionary of the Kingdom of Poland (in Polish). 3. Warszawa: Kasa im. Józefa Mianowskiego. 1882. p. 356.
