= Sofia Okunevska =

Ukrainian physician and feminist

- Софія Окуневська
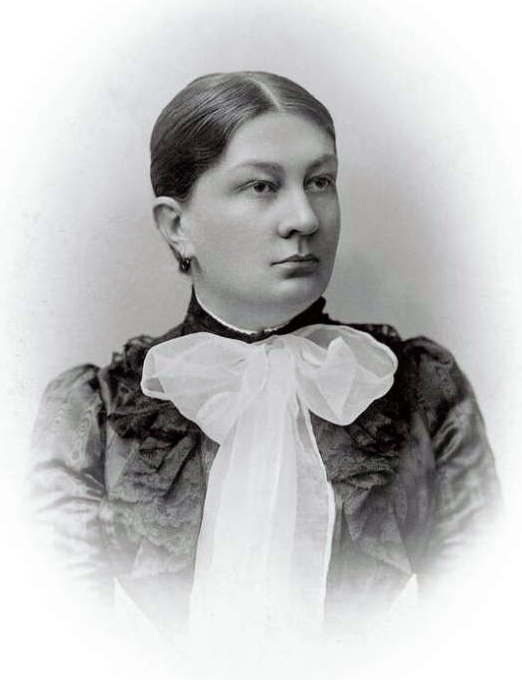
- Born: May 12, 1865; Dovzhanka, Galicia, Austrian Empire
- Died: February 24, 1926 (aged 60); Lviv
- Resting place: Lychakiv Cemetery
- Other names: Sofia Morachevsky
- Education: Doctor of Medicine
- Alma mater: University of Zurich
- Known for: First female physician in Austria-Hungary.
- Spouse: Vatslav Morachevsky
- Scientific career
- Fields: Medicine; Oncology; Obstetrics
- Thesis: [on blood changes under the influence of anemia] (1896)

Sofia Okunevska (Ukrainian: Софія Окуневська, German: Sofia Okunewska; 12 May 1865 – 24 February 1926) was a Ukrainian physician, educator, feminist, and scholar. She was the first woman in Galicia to receive a gymnasium diploma and obtain a university education, and also the first female Doctor of Medicine and the first female physician in Austria-Hungary. She pioneered the use of radiation therapy for combating cancer in Galicia and Austria-Hungary. She organized courses for nursing sisters and midwives, co-sponsored the establishment of the first medical trade union, and compiled a dictionary of Ukrainian medical terminology. In addition to practicing medicine in Lviv, she also worked in Switzerland, Czechia, and in the Austrian camps during World War I.

Okunevska was a public activist and an important figure of the feminist movement in Galicia and Austria-Hungary. She also ventured into other fields of study, such as literature and various scientific studies. (Note: See #Feminist movement and other activities)

She spent the last years of her life in Lviv, where she led a small medical practice. Sofia Okunevska died in a hospital of purulent appendicitis and was buried in the Lychakiv Cemetery.

== Early life and education ==
Okunevska was born on 12 May 1865 in the village of Dovzhanka, near Ternopil, into the family of Greek-Catholic priest Atanas Danylovych Okunevsky and Karolina Luchakovska. Her mother died in 1870, and Sofia was thenceforth raised by her aunt, Teofilie Okunevska-Ozarkevich. At that time she met and befriended her cousin, the future writer Nataliya Kobrynska.

In 1884, Okunevska obtained permission to take exams for the gymnasium course, and in 1885, which she brilliantly passed at the Lviv Academic Gymnasium, causing a sensation throughout Galicia.

Since women in Austria-Hungary did not have the right to study in universities until 1900, in 1887 Okunevska and her cousin Kobrynska enrolled in a university in Switzerland. Kobrynska studied economics, while Okunevska attended the medical faculty of the University of Zurich. In January 1896, she successfully graduated, becoming the first Ukrainian woman of Galicia to obtain a medical university education, and indeed the first female doctor from Austrian lands. Her doctoral dissertation on blood changes under the influence of anemia earned her the medical degree of Doctor of Medicine.

While in Zurich, Sofia Okunevska met a student named Vatslav Damyan Morachevsky (1865-1950), a native of Warsaw, who was known for his pro-Ukrainian sentiments, and in 1890, she married him. In February 1896, Okunevska gave birth to their son, Yuri.

=== Feminist movement and other activities ===
Sofia Okunevska was lifelong friends with Olha Kobylianska.

Okunevska, along with her friends Nataliya Kobrynska and Olha Kobylianska, actively contributed to the development of the women's movement in Galicia and Bukovina. She was a passionate advocate of long walks in nature, horseback riding, skiing, conquering mountain peaks, and trying to participate in other sports activities that were only actively promoted by men at the time.

In 1887, she debuted in literature with her socio-psychological story "Sand. Sand!" (Ukrainian: «Пісок. Пісок!») about urban life. Okunevska authored the scientific investigation "Women's Domestic Slavery in Wedding Songs and Ritual" under her pseudonym of "Yerina", further compiling the works of "Family bondage in songs and wedding ceremonies" (Ukrainian: «Родинна неволя в піснях і обрядах весільних») as well as the premier women's almanac in Galicia, titled "First Wreath" (Ukrainian: «Перший вінок»).

== Career and later life ==
In January 1896, after Okunevska had become a doctor, she returned to Galicia with her husband, Vatslav Morachevsky. They could not immediately find employment in Galicia, as the Austrian government did not recognize foreign diplomas at the time. In 1898, Okunevska gave birth to her daughter, Eva.

In March 1900, the Senate of the Jagiellonian University in Krakow, at the time subject to Austrian rule as well, recognized the diplomas, but they couldn't find work still. Morachevsky subsequently went to Karlovy Vary, where he opened his private practice, while Okunevska stayed in Lviv with their children. Okunevska started to work at the "People's Clinic" founded by her cousin Dr. Yevhen Ozarkevych in 1903. She chose gynecology and became the region's first female gynecologist. At "People's Clinic," she organized courses for nursing sisters and midwives, compiled a Ukrainian medical terminology dictionary, and helped establish the "Medical Commission," the first doctors' union. She was the first oncologist in Galicia and Austria-Hungary to utilize radiation therapy in treating cancer.

Okunevska was a full member of the Shevchenko Scientific Society, actively working in its mathematical-naturalist-medical section. Her scientific research on osmosis, erythrocyte osmotic pressure, was published in the medical collection of the Shevchenko Scientific Society. She studied the state of obstetric care and established a school for obstetrician-gynecologists in Lviv. She was concerned and outraged by the fact that child mortality in Galicia and the frequency of defects associated with childbirth trauma were the highest in Europe. She was also a member of the Medical Commission, founded in 1897 as the first professional association of Ukrainian doctors. During World War I, she provided medical care to Ukrainians in Austrian camps.

The subsequent conflict between Ukrainians and Poles affected the family greatly. Sofia and Vatslav divorced, and a few months later, in 1919, their daughter Eva committed suicide. Eva was pursuing education in Switzerland and could have become the first Ukrainian female architect. Morachevsky carried the urn of his daughter with him at all times for the rest of his life.

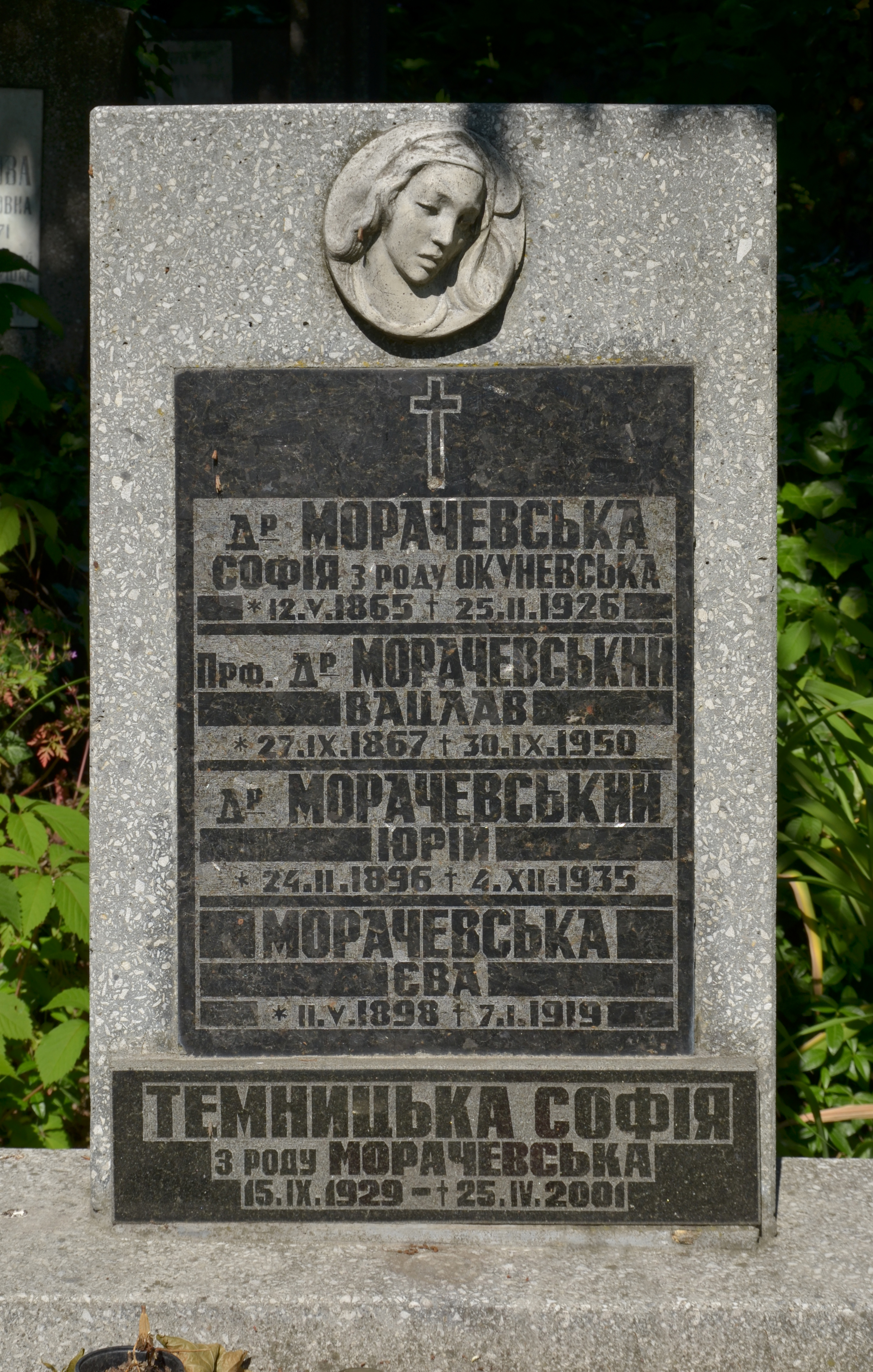
Sofia Okunevska's family grave

Okunevska moved to Lviv, to the house purchased by Andrey Sheptytsky for the artist Oleksa Novakivskyi, and began providing private medical assistance. The house was located opposite of St. George's Cathedral. The only consolation left for Okunevska was her son Yuriy. She lived with him, his wife, and their newborn daughter until 1925, when he moved to his own place.

She spent her final years in Lviv, where she maintained her small medical practice. Okunevska remained socially active until her final days. She attended meetings of the women's organization "Ukrainian Society of Women with Higher Education", established in Lviv in 1924 under the leadership of Olena Stepaniv-Dashkevych.

Sofia Okunevska died in a hospital from a severe appendicitis on February 24, 1926. She was buried in the Lychakiv Cemetery in Lviv. Later, her son Yuri, daughter Eva, husband Vatslav, and granddaughter Sofia were buried alongside her.

== Literature ==
- Вознюк В. О. Велич і сила Софії Окуневської / В. Вознюк // Вознюк В. О. До джерел культури Буковини. — Чернівці, 2002. — С. 53—65; Буковина. — 2000. — 24 травня (№ 138). — С. 1, 3.
- Вознюк В. О. Видатна подруга видатної письменниці: [Софія Окуневська-Марачевська та Ольга Кобилянська] / Володимир Вознюк // Доба. — 2003. — 28 жовтня (ч. 48). — С. 4.
- Врублевська В. В. Шарітка з Рунгу: Біографічний роман про Ольгу Кобилянську. — К. : ВЦ «Академія», 2007. — 512 с. — (Автографи часу).
- Гусар Ю. С.. Видатна подруга видатної письменниці: [Про Софію Окуневську-Морачевську] / Юхим Гусар // Буковинське віче.- 2010. — 7 травня (№ 33). — С. 3.
- Лікар Софія Окуневська (1865—1926 рр.) // Кобилянський С. Д. Історія медицини Буковини: цифри і факти / С. Д. Кобилянський, В. П. Пішак, Б. Я. Дробніс. — Чернівці, 1999. — С. 68.
- Огуй О. Д. Окуневська-Морачевська Софія // Енциклопедія історії України : у 10 т. / редкол.: В. А. Смолій (голова) та ін. ; Інститут історії України НАН України. — Київ : Наукова думка, 2010. — Т. 7 : Мл — О. — С. 560. — 728 с. : іл. — ISBN 978-966-00-1061-1.
- [Окуневська-Марочевська] // Українська Радянська Енциклопедія (УРЕ). — Київ: Головна редакція української радянської енциклопедії, 1982. — С. 519.
- 12 травня — 145 років від дня народження першої жінки-лікаря, доктора медицини Софії-Окуневської-Марачевської (1865—1926) // Пам'ятаймо! (Знаменні та пам'ятні дати Буковини в 2010 р.): бібліографічний покажчик.- Чернівці: Книги — ХХІ, 2009. — С. 170—171.
