= Ternopil Raion =

Subdivision of Ternopil Oblast, Ukraine

Ternopil Raion Тернопільський район
- Raion
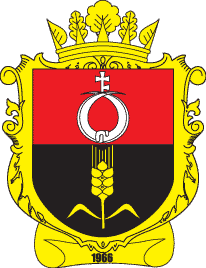
- Flag Coat of arms

- Coordinates: 49°30′N 25°40′E
- Country: Ukraine
- Oblast: Ternopil Oblast
- Established: 1966
- Admin. center: Ternopil
- Subdivisions: 25 hromadas

Area
  - Total: 6,203 km^{2} (2,395 sq mi)

Population (2022)
  - Total: 559,357
  - Density: 90.18/km^{2} (233.6/sq mi)
- Time zone: UTC+02:00 (EET)
  - Summer (DST): UTC+03:00 (EEST)
- Postal index: 47701—47745
- Area code: +380-352
- Website: www.ternoregion.com.ua

Ternopil Raion (Ukrainian: Тернопільський район) is a raion in Ternopil Oblast, western Ukraine. Its administrative center is Ternopil. It has a population of 559,357 (2022 estimate).

On 18 July 2020, as part of the administrative reform of Ukraine, the number of raions of Ternopil Oblast was reduced to three, and the area of Ternopil Raion was significantly expanded. Six abolished raions, Berezhany, Kozova, Pidhaitsi, Pidvolochysk, Terebovlia, and Zboriv Raions, a part of one more abolished raion, Zbarazh Raion, as well as Berezhany Municipality and the city of Ternopil, which was previously incorporated as a city of oblast significance and did not belong to the raion, were merged into Ternopil Raion. The January 2020 estimate of the raion population was 67,199 (2020 est.).

== Subdivisions ==
=== Current ===
After the reform in July 2020, the raion consisted of 25 hromadas:

- Baikivtsi rural hromada with the administration in the selo of Baikivtsi, retained from Ternopil Raion;
- Bila rural hromada with the administration in the selo of Bila, retained from Ternopil Raion;
- Berezhany urban hromada with the administration in the city of Berezhany, transferred from Berezhany Raion and Berezhany Municipality;
- Ivanivka rural hromada with the administration in the selo of Ivanivka, transferred from Terebovlia Raion;
- Kozliv settlement hromada with the administration in the rural settlement of Kozliv, transferred from Kozova Raion;
- Kozova settlement hromada with the administration in the rural settlement of Kozova, transferred from Kozova Raion;
- Kupchyntsi rural hromada with the administration in the selo of Kupchyntsi, transferred from Kozova Raion;
- Mykulyntsi settlement hromada with the administration in the rural settlement of Mykulyntsi, transferred from Terebovlia Raion;
- Naraiv rural hromada with the administration in the selo of Naraiv, transferred from Berezhany Raion;
- Ozerna rural hromada with the administration in the selo of Ozerna, transferred from Zboriv Raion;
- Pidhaitsi urban hromada with the administration in the city of Pidhaitsi, transferred from Pidhaitsi Raion;
- Pidhorodne rural hromada with the administration in the selo of Pidhorodne, retained from Ternopil Raion;
- Pidvolochysk settlement hromada with the administration in the rural settlement of Pidvolochysk, transferred from Pidvolochysk Raion;
- Saranchuky rural hromada with the administration in the selo of Saranchuky, transferred from Berezhany Raion;
- Skalat urban hromada with the administration in the city of Skalat, transferred from Pidvolochysk Raion;
- Skoryky rural hromada with the administration in the selo of Skoryky, transferred from Pidvolochysk Raion;
- Terebovlia urban hromada with the administration in the city of Terebovlia, transferred from Terebovlia Raion;
- Ternopil urban hromada with the administration in the city of Ternopil, transferred from the city of Ternopil and Zboriv Raion;
- Velyka Berezovytsia settlement hromada with the administration in the rural settlement of Velyka Berezovytsia, retained from Ternopil Raion;
- Velyki Birky settlement hromada with the administration in the rural settlement of Velyki Birky, retained from Ternopil Raion;
- Velyki Hai rural hromada with the administration in the selo of Velyki Hai, retained from Ternopil Raion;
- Zaliztsi settlement hromada with the administration in the rural settlement of Zaliztsi, transferred from Zboriv Raion;
- Zbarazh urban hromada with the administration in the city of Zbarazh, transferred from Zbarazh Raion;
- Zboriv urban hromada with the administration in the city of Zboriv, transferred from Zboriv Raion;
- Zolotnyky rural hromada with the administration in the selo of Zolotnyky, transferred from Terebovlia Raion.

=== Before 2020 ===
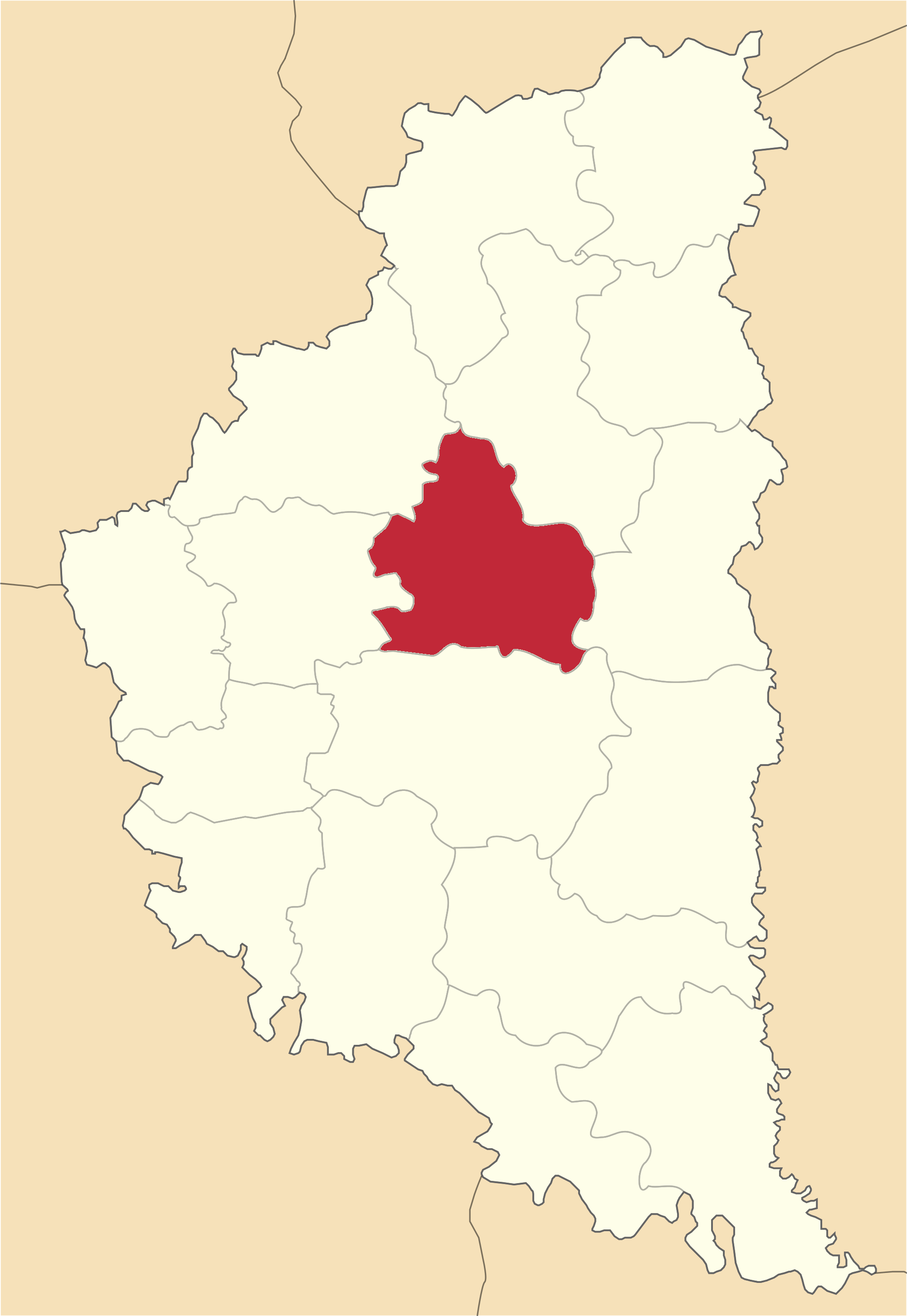
Ternopil Raion in Ternopil Oblast (1966-2020)

Before the 2020 reform, the raion consisted of six hromadas:

- Baikivtsi rural hromada with the administration in Baikivtsi;
- Bila rural hromada with the administration in Bila;
- Pidhorodne rural hromada with the administration in Pidhorodne;
- Velyka Berezovytsia settlement hromada with the administration in Velyka Berezovytsia;
- Velyki Birky settlement hromada with the administration in Velyki Birky;
- Velyki Hai rural hromada with the administration in Velyki Hai.

== Settlements ==
Settlement

- Kozliv
- Mykulyntsi
- Pidvolochysk
- Velyki Birky
- Velyka Berezovytsia
- Zaliztsi

Villages

in former Ternopil Raion

- Anhelivka
- Baikivtsi
- Bavoriv
- Bila
- Biloskirka
- Butsniv
- Cherneliv-Ruskyi
- Chystyliv
- Domamorych
- Dovzhanka
- Drahanivka
- Dubivtsi
- Dychkiv
- Hai-Hrechynski
- Hai-Shevchenkivski
- Hrabovets
- Ihrovytsya
- Ivachiv Dolishnii
- Ivachiv Horishnii
- Khatky
- Kostiantynivka
- Kozivka
- Kypyachka
- Lozova
- Luchka
- Malyi Khodachkiv
- Marianivka
- Myroliubivka
- Myshkovychi
- Nastasiv
- Ostriv
- Petrykiv
- Pidhorodne
- Plotycha
- Pochapyntsi
- Proshova
- Romanivka
- Seredynky
- Shliakhtyntsi
- Skomorokhy
- Smolianka
- Smykivtsi
- Soborne
- Stehnykivtsi
- Stupky
- Teofilivka
- Tovstoluh
- Velyka Luka
- Velyki Hai
- Velykyi Hlybochok
- Yosypivka
- Zaboiky
- Zastavye
- Zastinka

== See also ==
- Subdivisions of Ukraine
