= Sudak Bay =

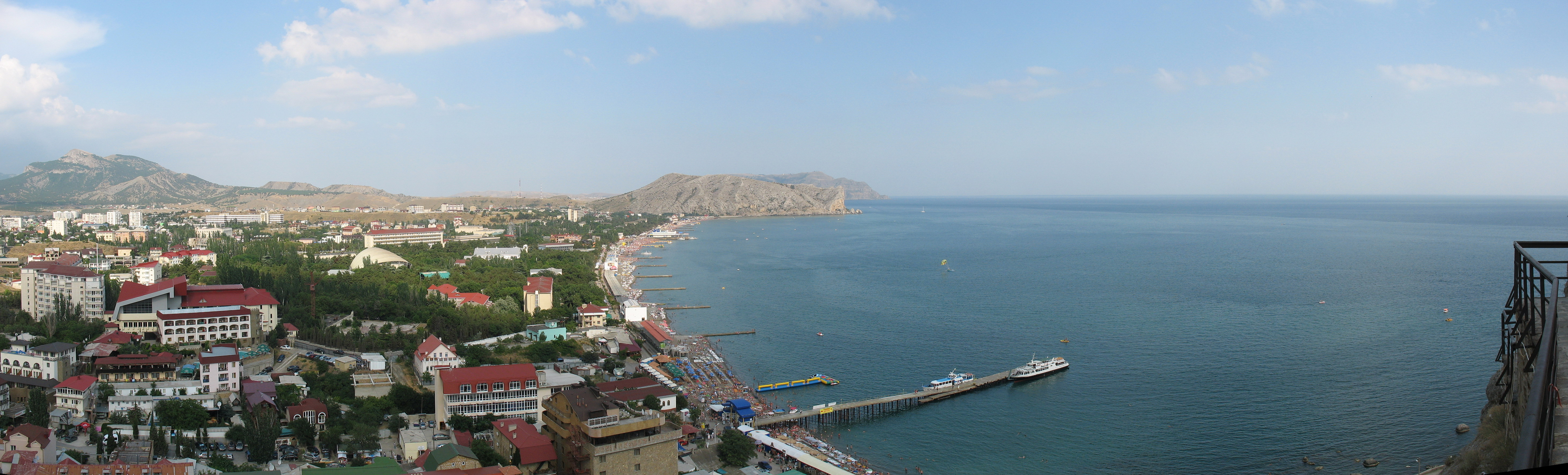

- Location within Crimea
- Location: Black Sea
- Coordinates: 44°49′N 34°59′E
- Ocean/sea sources: Atlantic Ocean
- Basin countries: Russia/Ukraine
- Max. length: 4 km (2.5 mi)
- Max. width: 12 km (7.5 mi)
- Average depth: 50 m (160 ft)

Sudak Bay (Russian: Судакская бухта; Ukrainian: Судацька бухта; Crimean Tatar: Sudaq körfezi, Судакъ корьфези) is a bay in the Black Sea near Sudak, Crimea.
