= Bravlin =

Apocryphal overlord of the Rus'

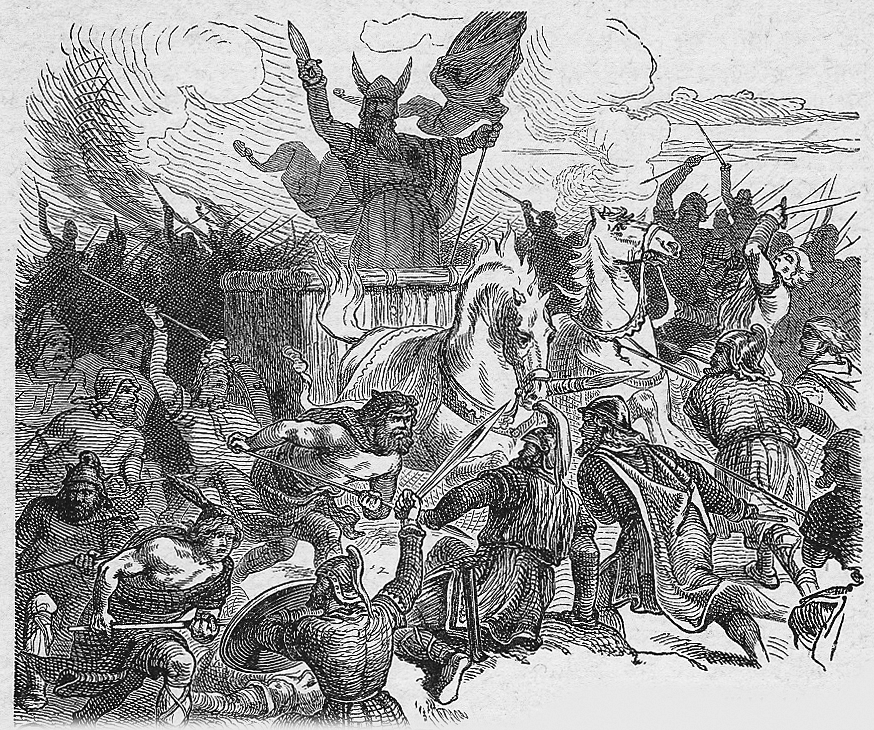
Battle of Brávellir by Friedrich Wilhelm Heine.

Bravlin (apparent Cyrillic: "Бравлин") was an apocryphal overlord of the Rus' who supposedly devastated all the Crimea from Kerch to Sougdaia in the last years of the 8th century but was paralyzed when he had entered the church of St. Stephen in Sougdaia.

His Crimean campaign is mentioned in only one source, the Russian version of the Life of St. Stephen of Sougdaia (Stephen of Surozh in Russian), tentatively dated to the 15th or 16th centuries. Vasily Vasilievsky, who was the first to publish this manuscript in the 19th century, reasoned that the core of the narrative might stem from the Early Middle Ages, reflecting a vague memory of some 10th-century Russo-Byzantine conflict.

Since St. Stephen died in 786 and Bravlin's invasion is said to have happened "several years" after his death (during the term of Stephen's successor, archbishop Philaret), this Rus' expedition is usually dated to the 790s. Among those historians who view Bravlin as a historical figure, Nikolay Belyaev attempted to trace in his fanciful name some allusion to the Battle of Bravalla (770). Anyway, the name Bravlin is obviously of non-Slavic origin and may be attributed only to Vikings who at that time represented a serious force on ancient Slavic lands.

Alexander Vasiliev discarded the account of this campaign as a typical pious legend, whose interest is purely literary rather than historical. Constantine Zuckerman casts further doubts on the historicity of Bravlin and his raid against the Crimea.
