= Genoese fortress, Sudak =

Genoese fortress
- Генуезька фортеця (Ukrainian); Генуэзская крепость (Russian)
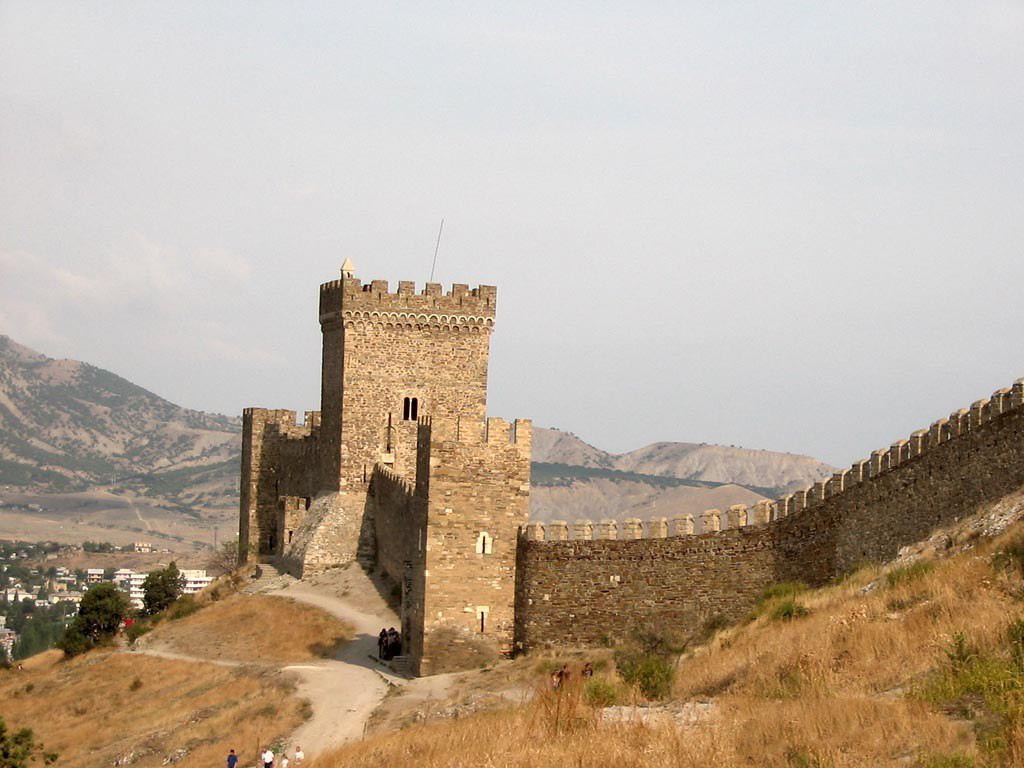
- Interactive map of Genoese fortress
- 44°50′25″N 34°57′28″E
- Location: Sudak, Crimea

History
- Built: 13th–14th centuries

Immovable Monument of National Significance of Ukraine
- Official name: Генуезька фортеця (Genoese fortress)
- Type: Architecture
- Reference no.: 010071

The Genoese fortress (Ukrainian: Генуезька фортеця; Russian: Генуэзская крепость; Crimean Tatar: Ceneviz qalesi; Italian: fortezza genovese) or Sudak fortress is a fortress in Sudak, Crimea, built by the Genoese in 13th–15th centuries. The total area of the fortress is 27.9 ha.

== History ==
First fortifications near Sudak were built by the Romans in the 3rd–4th centuries. Bosporans had their own fortifications in Sougdaia (Sudak) as well. In 13th century, the Genoese started settling in Sougdaia. In late 13th to early 14th century, stone fortifications were built around the city center. In the first half of 14th century, the Mongols invaded the city, and as the result, the original Genoese fortifications were ruined. After the death of Khan Berdi Beg, the Republic of Genoa retook Sougdaia (then named Soldaia), and a new fortress was built around the city. This period of the fortress's history is most well-researched thanks to inscriptions left on the walls by the Genoese. In 1475, Sudak came under the control of the Ottoman Empire. In 1771, Sudak got occupied by armed forces of the Russian Empire. The fortress lost its importance and strategic value under Imperial Russian reign, and therefore the Genoese buildings and parts of the fortress were dismantled, and the bricks were used for new construction.

In 1925, a historical and archaeological museum was established on the territory of the Genoese fortress, which in 1926 became a part of the Moscow State Historical Museum. In 1958, after the transfer of Crimea to Ukrainian SSR, the fortress became a part of National Reserve "Sophia of Kyiv". Restoration works have been ongoing since 1959. The Genoese fortress was nominated for Seven Wonders of Ukraine. The fortress became a Tentative World Heritage Site in 2007 and joined a larger transnational nomination of Genoese fortresses on the Black and Mediterranean seas in 2010.

== Structure ==
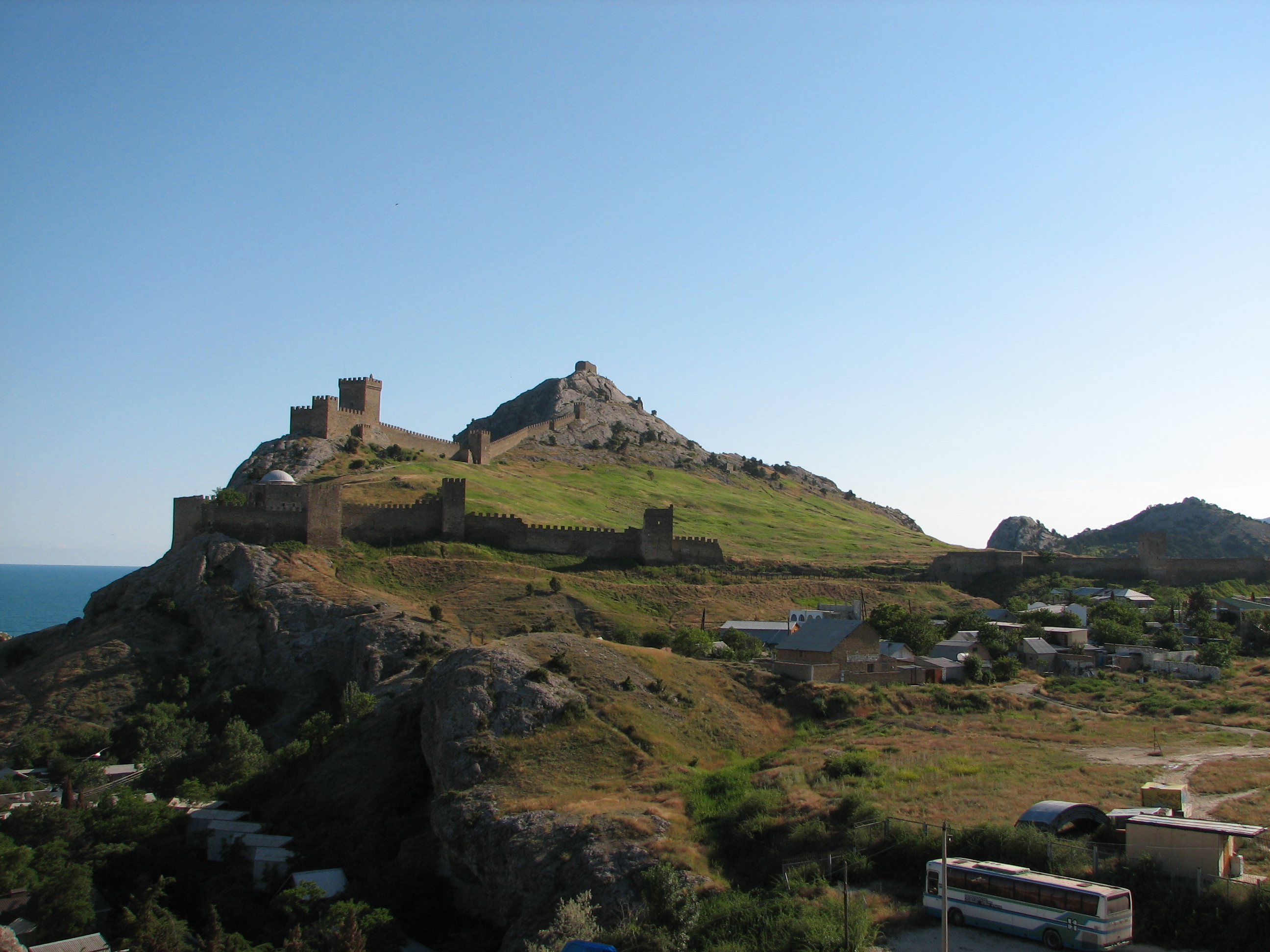
View of the Genoese fortress from a nearby mountain. Lower tier is in front, upper tier is in the back.

The Genoese fortress is located on a mountain, surrounded by the Black Sea to the south and a moat to the north. The fortress is divided into two parts: the upper tier and the lower tier.

=== Lower tier ===
The lower tier constitutes the northern half of the fortress. The wall of the lower tier is 6–8 m tall and 1.5–2 m wide. It includes fourteen 15 m towers and the main gate.

=== Upper tier ===
The upper tier constitutes the southern half of the fortress near the sea. It includes the Consul's Castle and a number of towers. Notable towers of the upper tier are the Watch Tower, the Corner Tower, and George's Tower.

=== City ===
There are multiple buildings on the territory surrounded by the Genoese fortress, as well as structures outside of the walls, including as storage buildings, a water cistern, Padişah Cami Mosque, Church of the Twelve Apostles, as well as the remains of barracks built by Russian Imperial army.

== Gallery ==
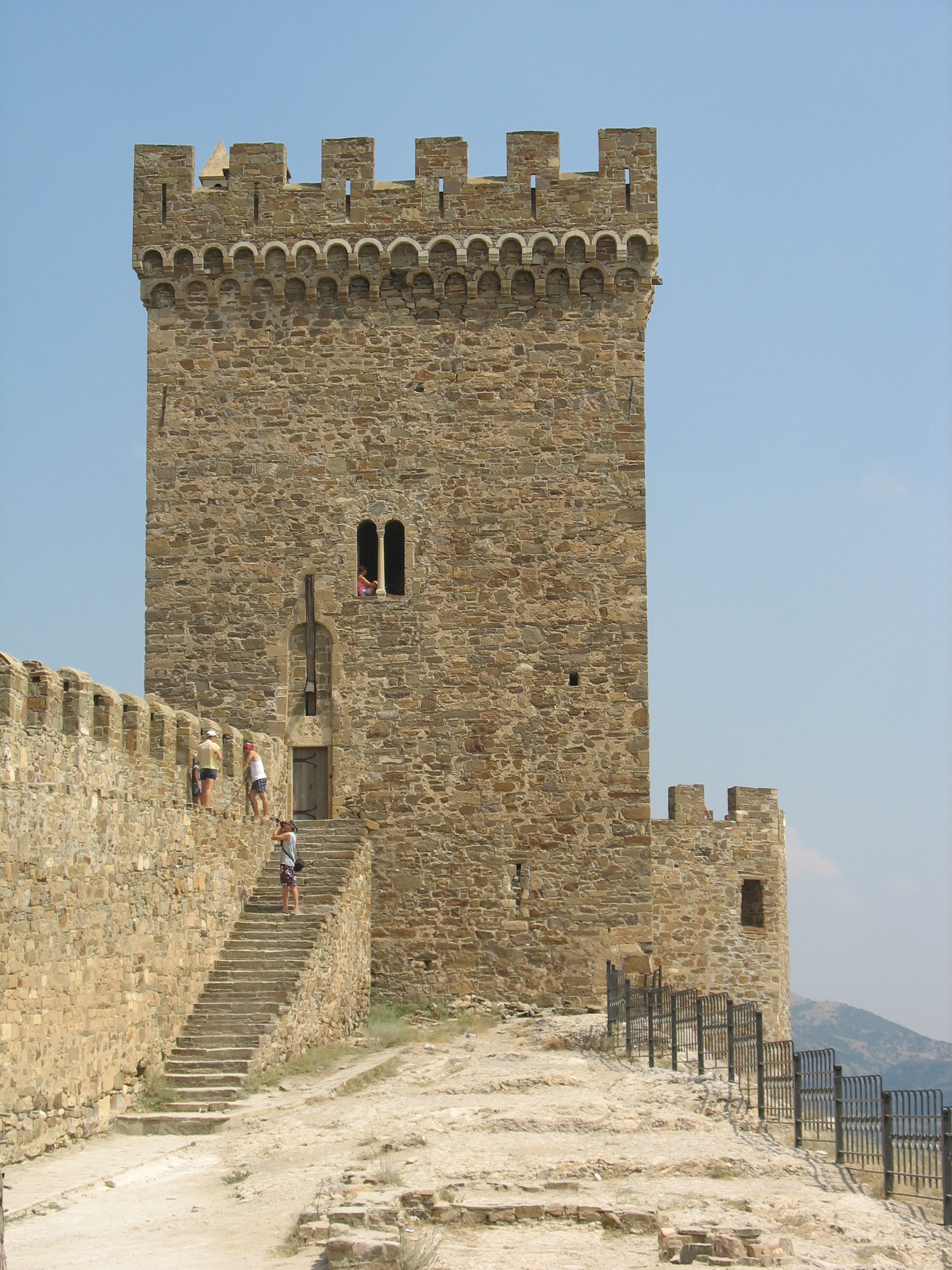
Consul's Castle

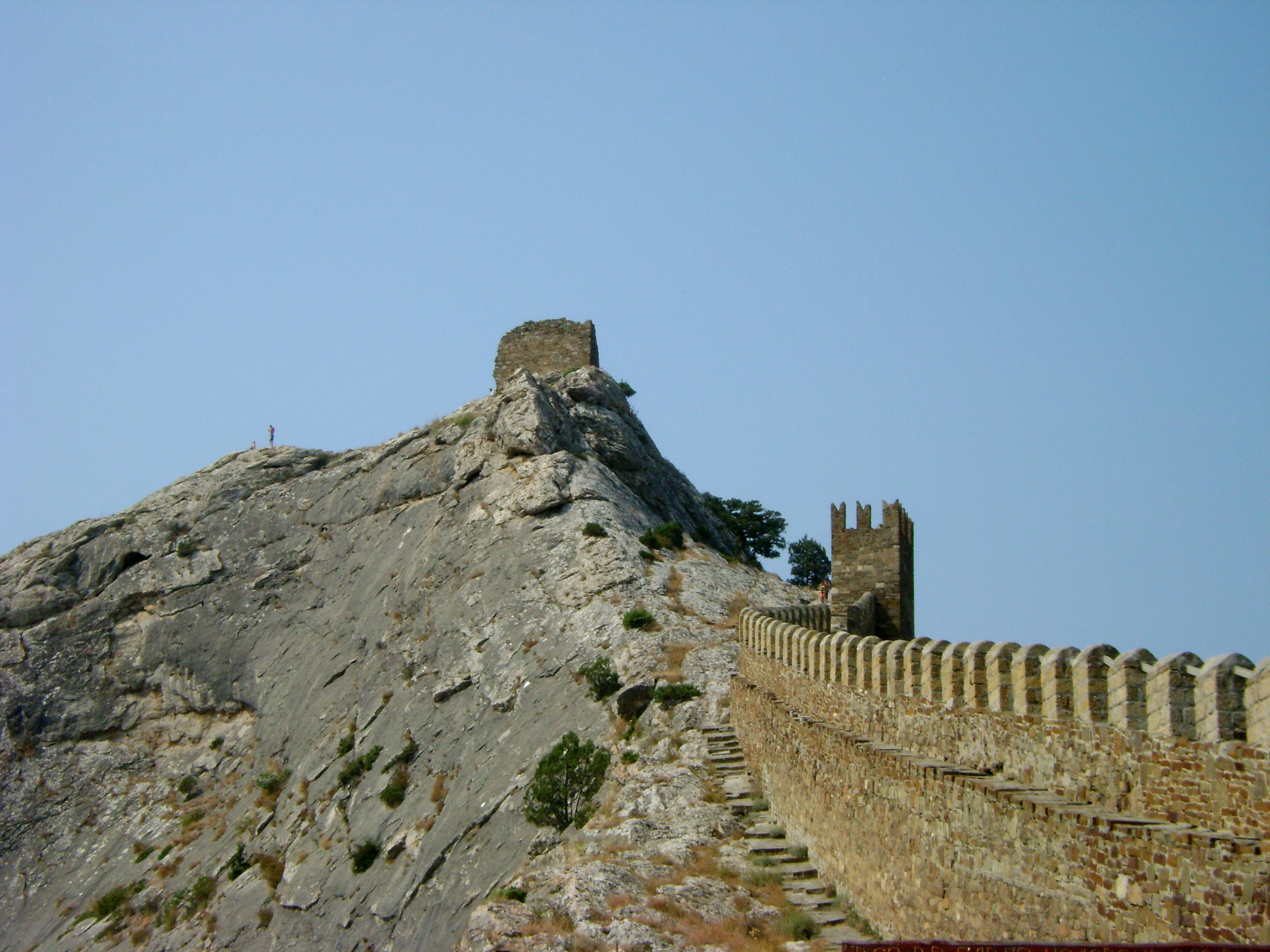
The Watch Tower

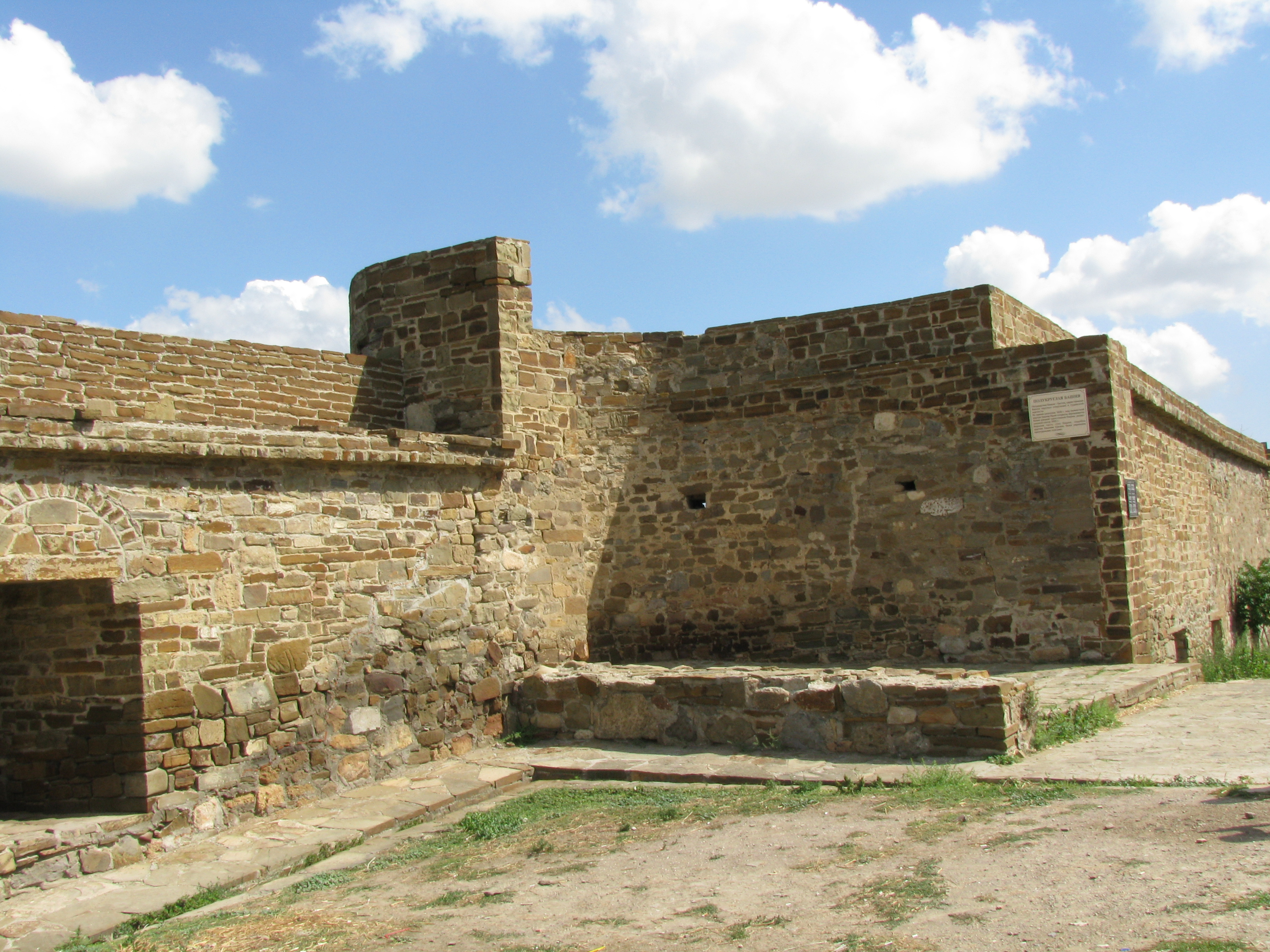
Ruins of the Semicircular Tower

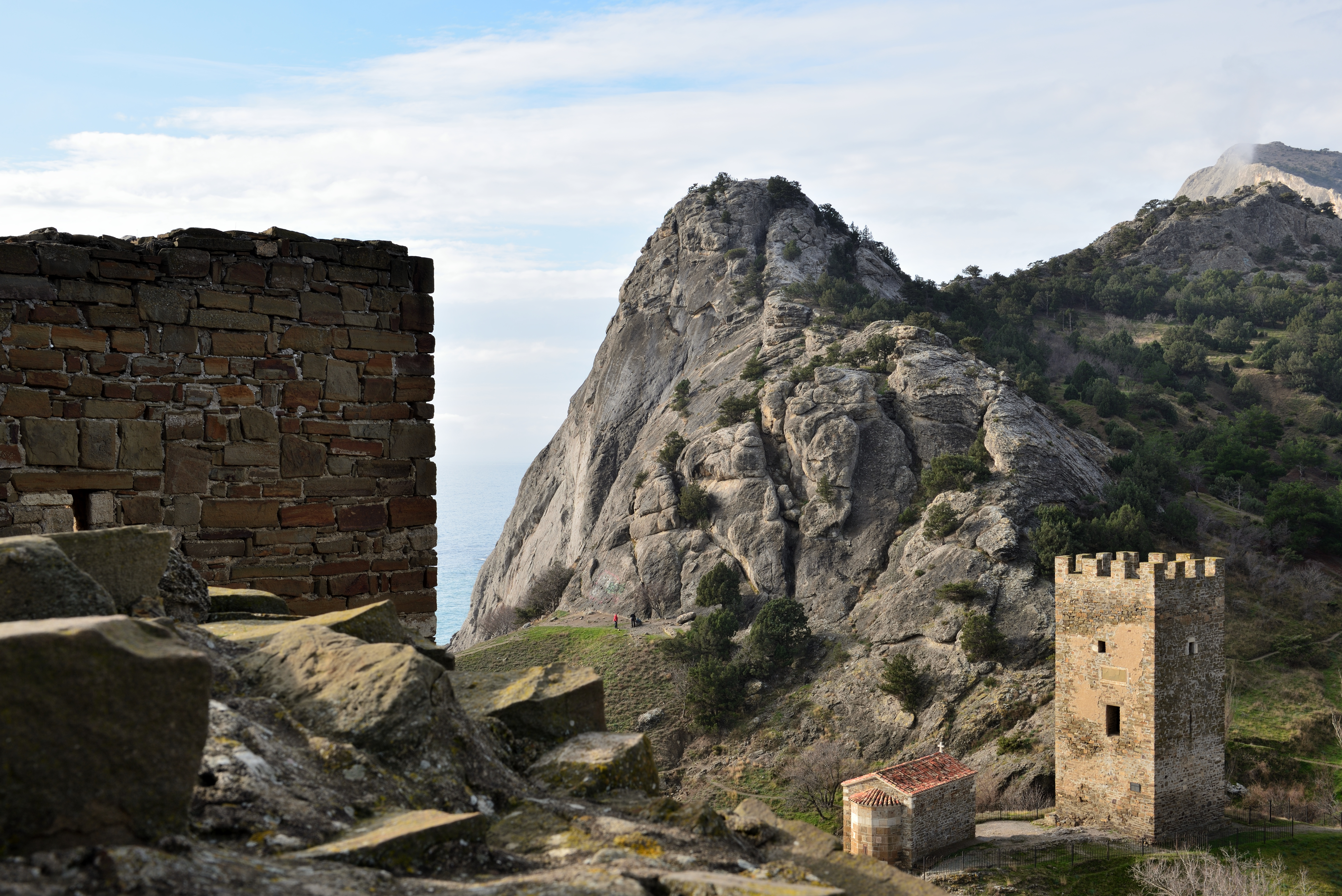
The Corner Tower

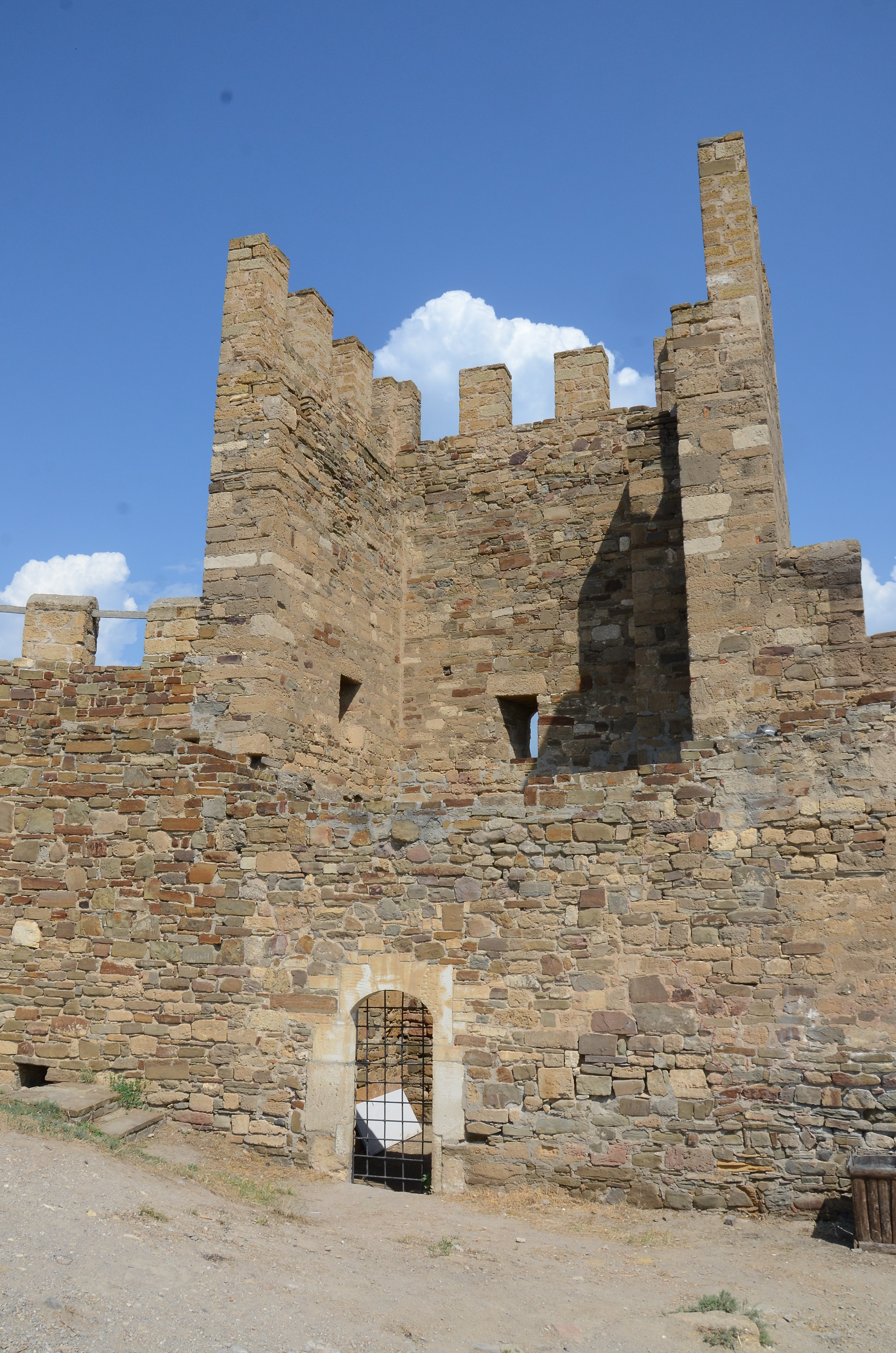
George's Tower

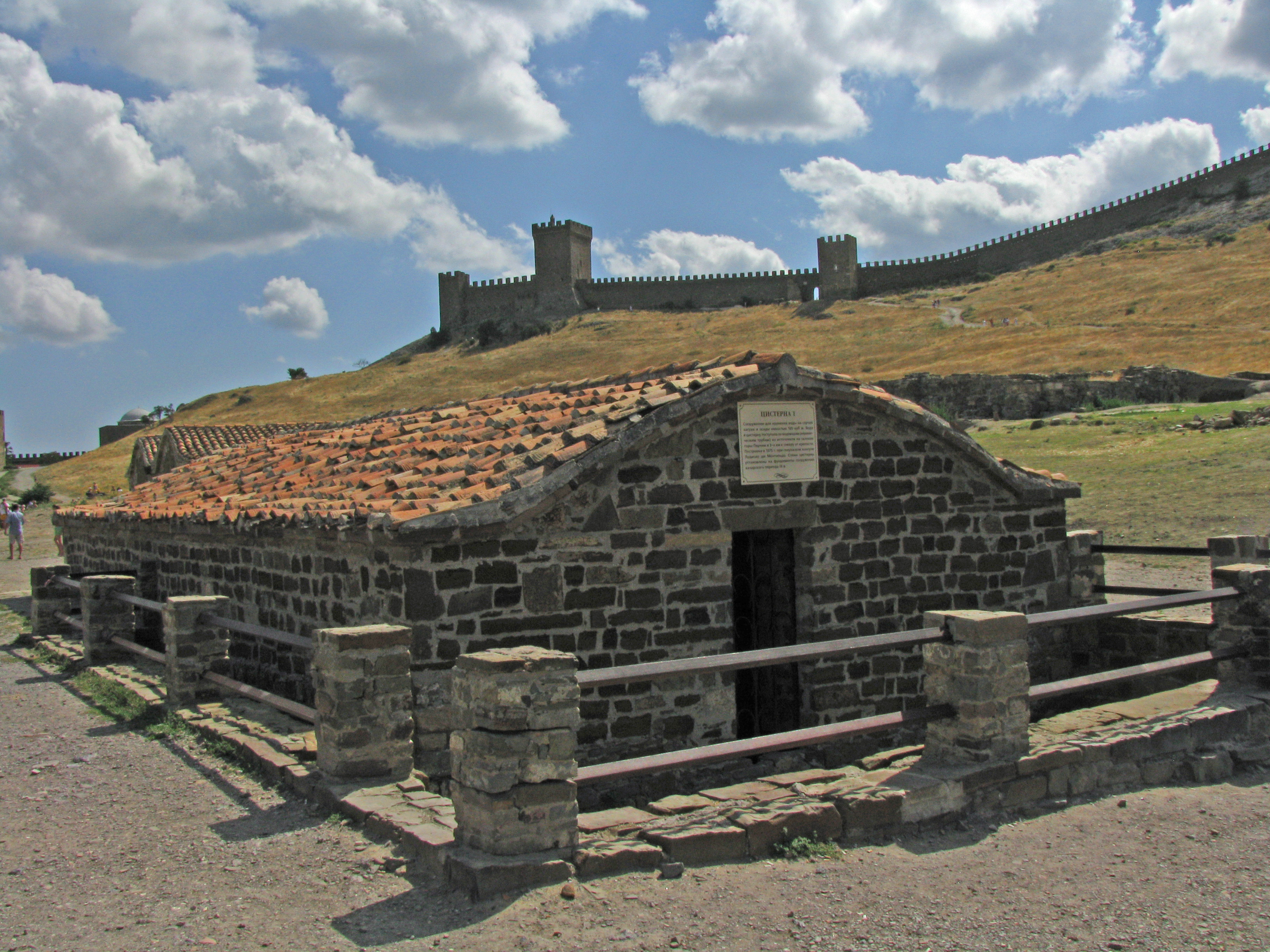
Water cistern

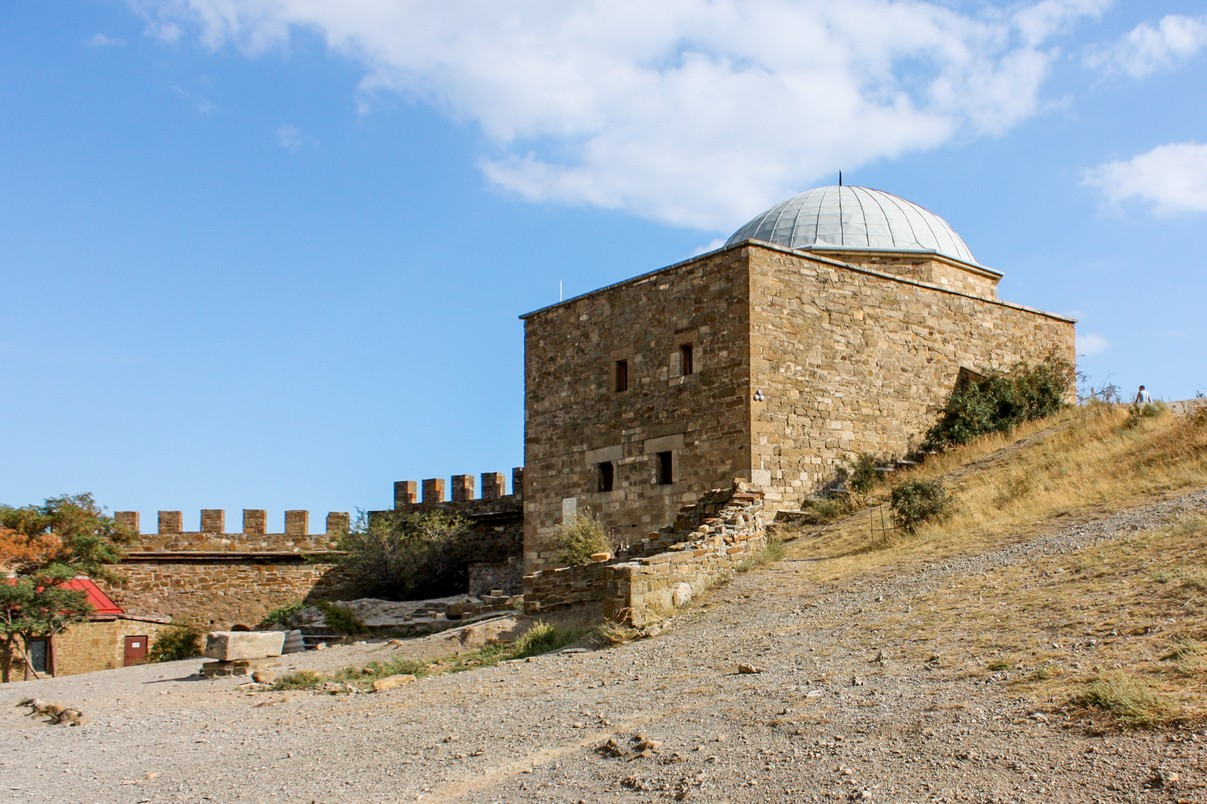
Padişah Cami Mosque

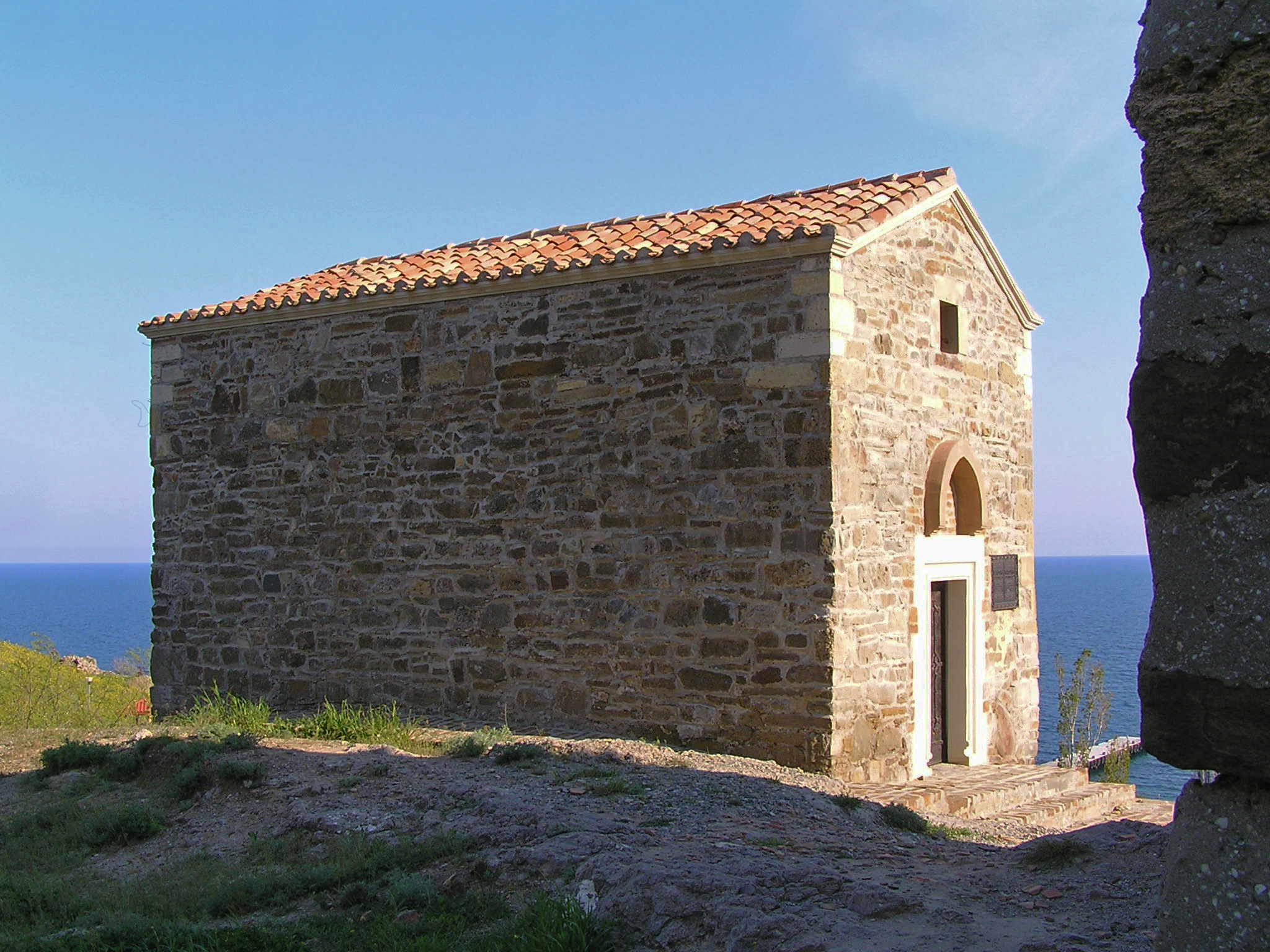
Church of the Twelve Apostles

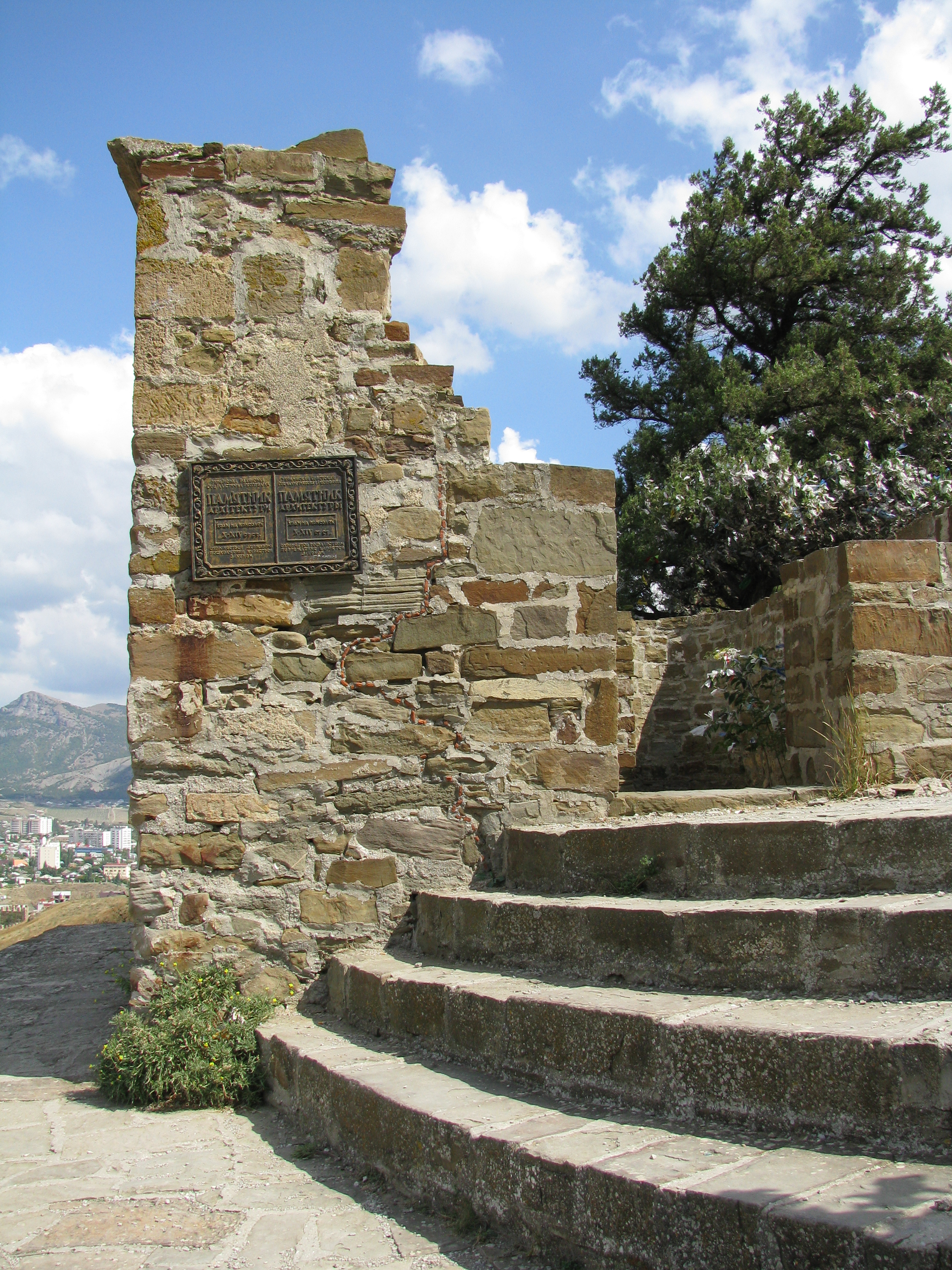
Ruins of a church

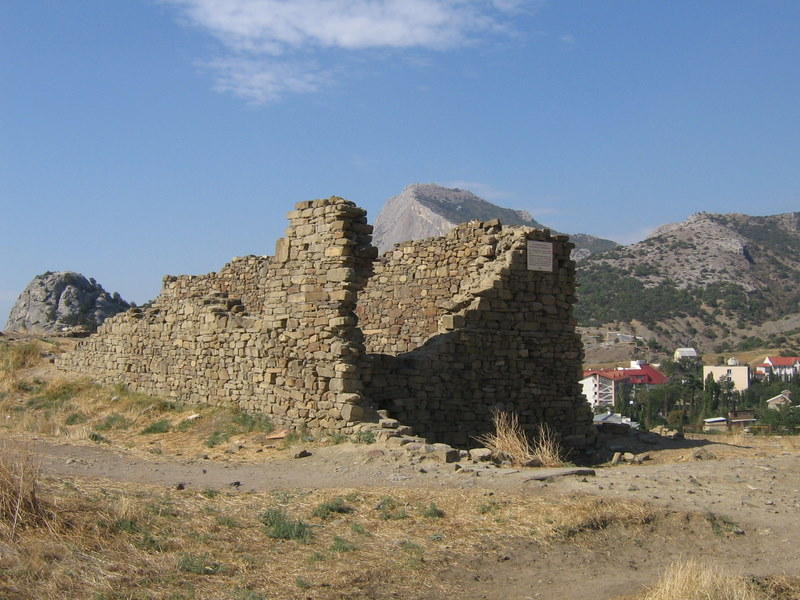
Ruins of Russian barracks

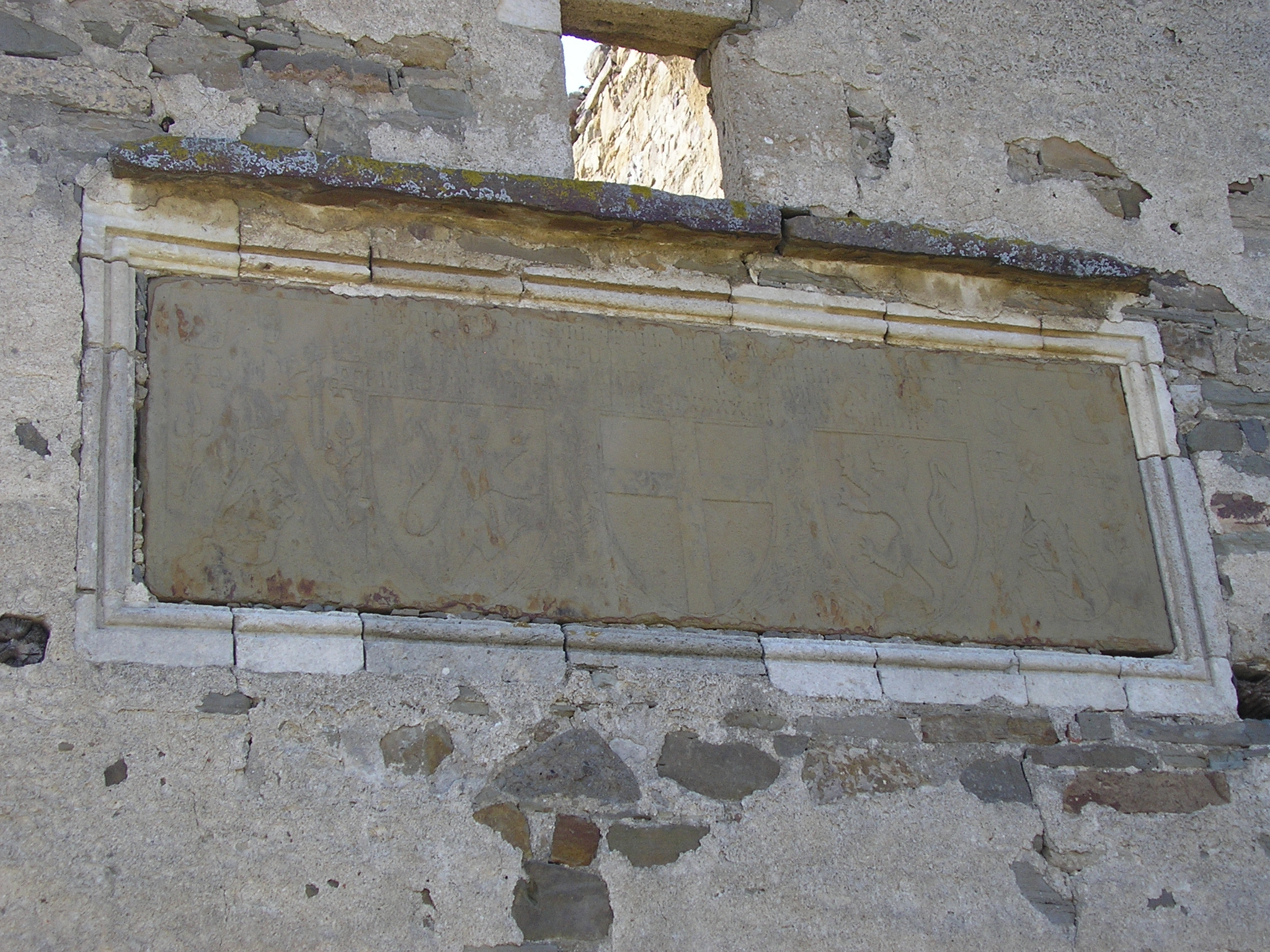
Heraldry
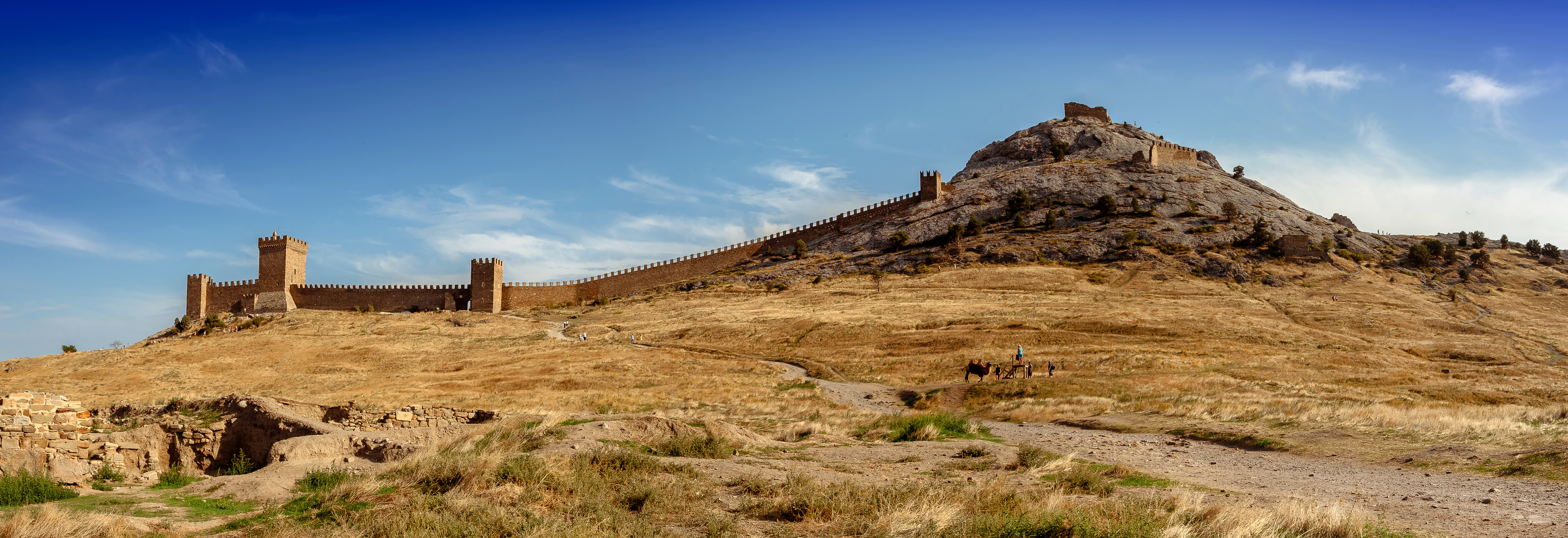
Panorama of the Genoese fortress

== See also ==
- Genoese colonies
- Genoese towers in Corsica
