= Sudak =

Town in Crimea

Sudak Судак Sudaq
- City
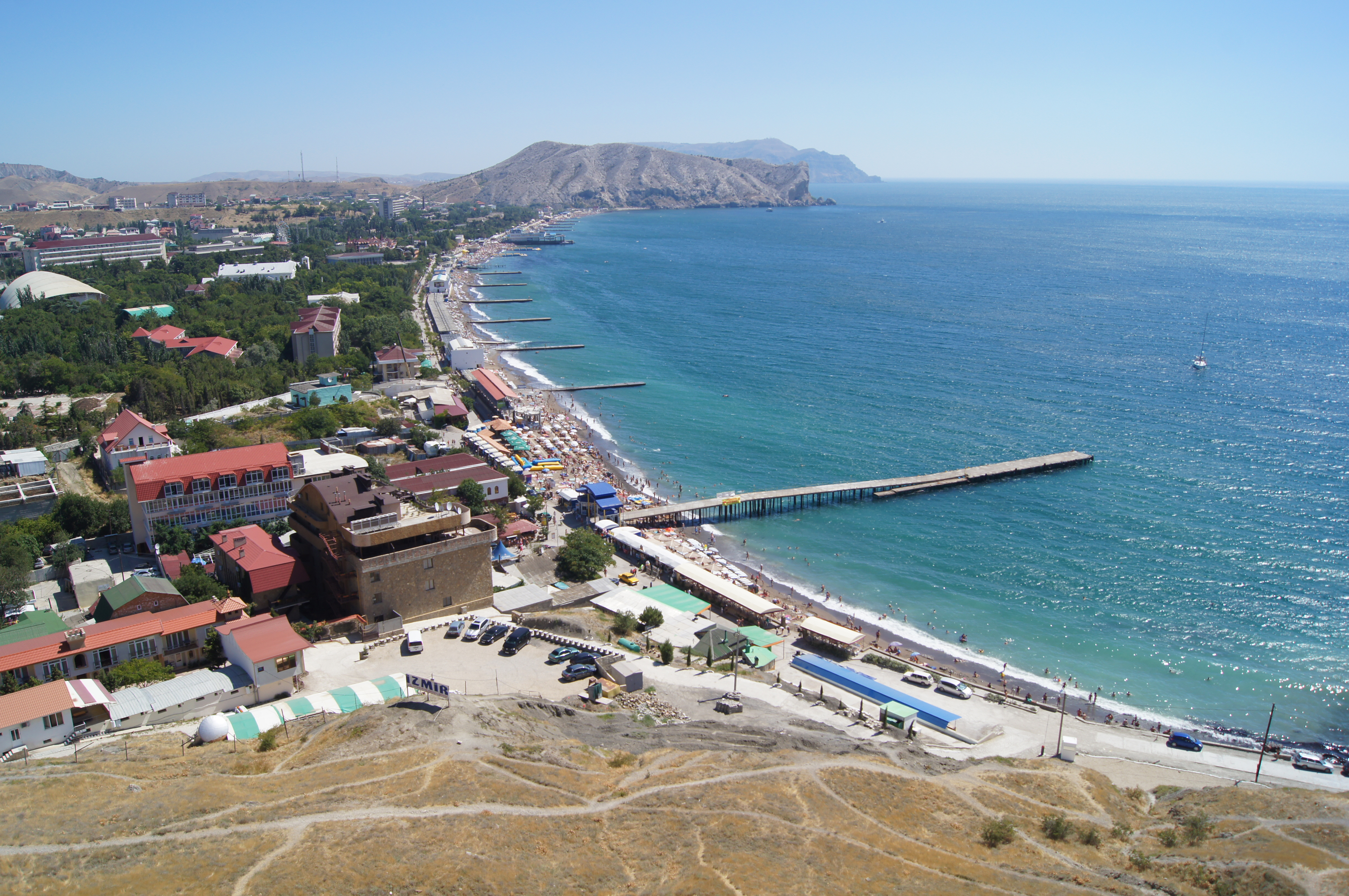
- Sudak

- Coat of arms
- Interactive map of Sudak
- Location of Sudak (red dot) within Crimea Location of Sudak within Ukraine Location of Sudak within the Black Sea Region
- Coordinates: 44°51′5″N 34°58′21″E
- Country: Ukraine (occupied by Russia)
- Autonomous republic: Crimea (de jure)
- Raion: Feodosia Raion (de jure)
- Federal subject: Crimea (de facto)
- Municipality: Sudak Municipality (de facto)

Government
  - Mayor: Vladimir Serov

Area
  - Total: 15 km^{2} (5.8 sq mi)
- Elevation: 50 m (160 ft)

Population (2014)
  - Total: 16,492
  - Density: 1,086.6/km^{2} (2,814/sq mi)
- Time zone: UTC+3 (MSK)
- Postal code: 98000 — 98015
- Area code: +7-36566
- Former names: Soldaia (until 1475), Sougdeia, Sidagios
- Climate: Cfa

Sudak (Ukrainian and Russian: Судак; Crimean Tatar: Sudaq; Greek: Σουγδαία; sometimes spelled Sudac or Sudagh) is a city and a multiple former Eastern Orthodox bishopric and double Latin Catholic titular see. It is of regional significance in Crimea, a territory recognized by most countries as part of Ukraine but annexed by Russia as the Republic of Crimea. Sudak serves as the administrative center of Sudak Municipality, one of the regions Crimea is divided into. It is situated 57 km (35 mi) to the west of Feodosia (the nearest railway station) and 104 km (65 mi) to the east of Simferopol, the republic's capital. Population: 16,492 (2014 Census).

A city of antiquity, today it is a popular resort, best known for its Genoese fortress, the best preserved on the northern shore of the Black Sea.

== History ==
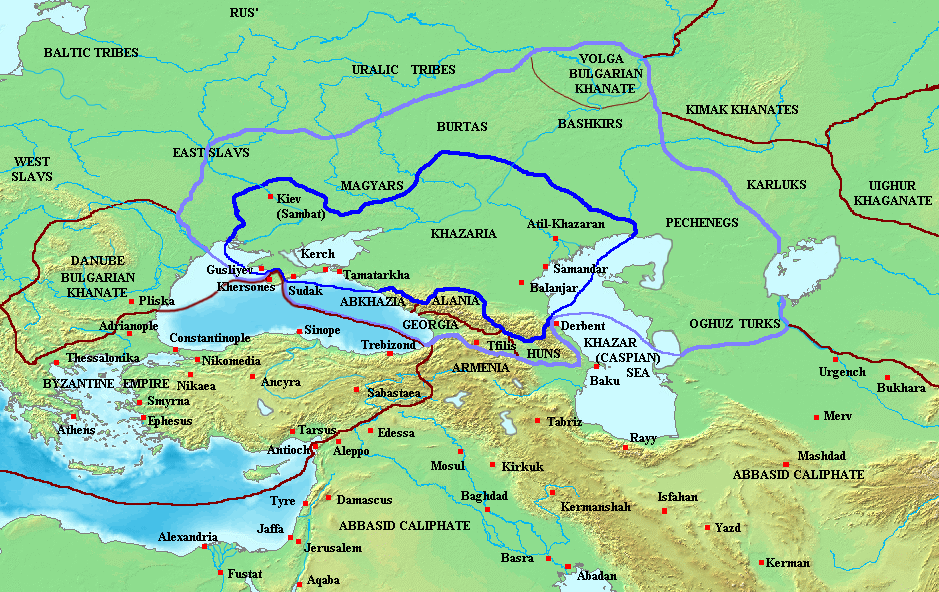
Map of the Khazar Khaganate and surrounding states, c. 820 CE. Area of direct Khazar control shown in dark blue, sphere of influence in purple. Other boundaries shown in dark red.

=== Foundation and early Middle Ages ===
The date and circumstances of the city's foundation are uncertain. The first written reference to the city dates to the 7th century (in the Ravenna Cosmography), but later local tradition places its foundation in 212 CE, and archaeological evidence supports its foundation in Roman times. The city was in all likelihood founded by the Alans, as its name in Greek sources, Sougdaia is a cognate of the adjective sugda ("pure, holy") or derives from the word sugded/sogdad in the Ossetian language.

In the early Middle Ages, the city appears to have been under very loose Byzantine control, like other cities in the region. Archaeological remains indicate considerable construction activity near the shore in the 6th century. Under Byzantine influence, the city was subject to Christianization, and became the seat of a bishopric under the Patriarch of Constantinople, attested for the first time in the Second Council of Nicaea in 787. Although a Greek-speaking population was probably settled in the city, the area remained dominated by the Alans: a 9th-century hagiography of Apostle Andrew places "Upper Sougdaia" elsewhere, between Zichia and the Cimmerian Bosporus, "in the land of the Alans", while the hagiographer of Constantine the Philosopher mentions the tribe of Sougdoi, situated between the Iberians and the Crimean Goths, which the historian Francis Dvornik identifies as the Alans.

The period between the 8th and 11th centuries is obscure, but the available evidence points to a sharp decline in Sougdaia's fortunes. Archaeological evidence shows that the 6th-century constructions were abandoned in the 8th/9th century, while later Russian legends (probably apocryphal) claim that the city was captured by the Rus' chieftain, Bravlin, at around the same time. Byzantine control lapsed, and the city probably came under Khazar suzerainty thereafter, which lasted until the early 11th century. In the early 10th century, the local see was promoted to an archbishopric.

=== High and late Middle Ages ===
The 11th–14th centuries represent a period of prosperity for the city, as shown in archaeological evidence of renewed activity both in the harbour as well as the hinterland and the area of the citadel. It became an important location for trading on the Silk Road in the 12th and 13th centuries, as a terminus for Black Sea trade. The 14th-century Arab traveller Ibn Battuta even compares its harbour with that of Alexandria. The 13th-century chronicler Ibn al-Athir writes of it as the "city of the Qifjaq from which (flow) their material possessions. It is on the Khazar Sea. Ships come to it bearing clothes. The Qifjiqs buy from them and sell them slaves. Burtas furs, beaver, squirrels ..."

By the mid-11th century, Sougdaia had returned to Byzantine control, probably following the defeat of the Khazar warlord Georgius Tzul in 1016. An inscription of 1059 mentions Leo Aliates, "strategos of Cherson and Sougdaia". By the end of the century, however, the city passed under Cuman control, which lasted until the 13th century. In c. 1222 the Seljuk Turks besieged it, followed by destructive raids by the Mongol Empire in 1223 and 1238. Finally, in c. 1249 the city came under the control of the Mongol Golden Horde, although it retained considerable autonomy. Contemporary sources place its population at the time to 8,300, including Greeks, Alans, Mongols, Armenians, Latins, and Jews.

Crimea in the middle of the 15th century

Under Tatar rule, the city was governed by the notables of the city and the 18 villages surrounding it. In the Greek sources they are mentioned by the Byzantine title sebastos, while the Latin sources use the Latinized Greek term proti ("first men"). Sometime between 1275 and 1282, the local see, which after being united with Phoulloi in the late 11th century was known as Sougdophoulloi, was raised to the status of a metropolitan see.

The city's prosperity was increased by the establishment of Venetian and Genoese commercial colonies in the Crimea during the late 13th century, but at the same time, the area was drawn into the constant disputes between these two rival cities. In the early 14th century, the city was eclipsed by the Genoese colonies of Tana and Kaffa: the Florentine merchant Francesco Balducci Pegolotti, who visited the area in c. 1330, neglects to mention the city altogether. At about the same time, the Tatars converted to Islam, which led to a deterioration of their relations with the Greek-speaking and Christian inhabitants of the city, many of whom were forced to leave it.

As a result, on 19 July 1365, the Genoese from Kaffa seized the city, which became a Genoese trading colony. The Genoese refortified the city, constructing the citadel that is still visible today, and induced a large part of the deported Greeks to return. Genoese rule lasted until 1475, when the Ottoman Grand Vizier Gedik Ahmed Pasha captured it after a long siege.

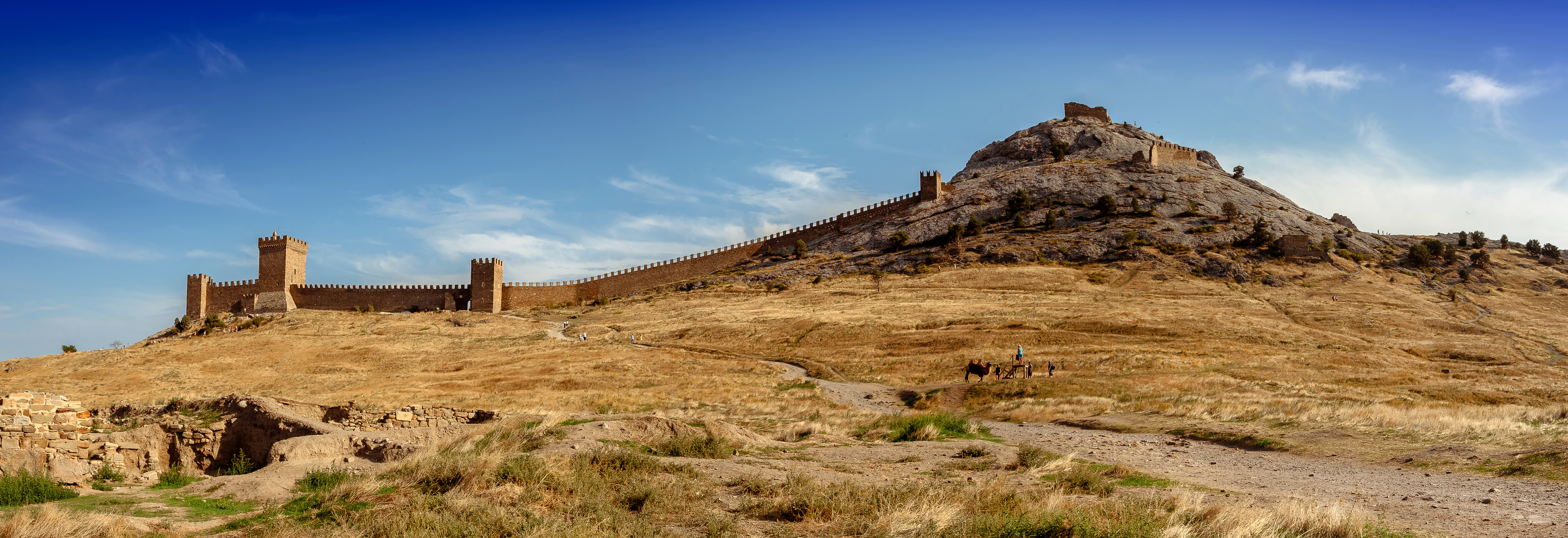
The Genoese fortress

=== Ottoman and modern periods ===
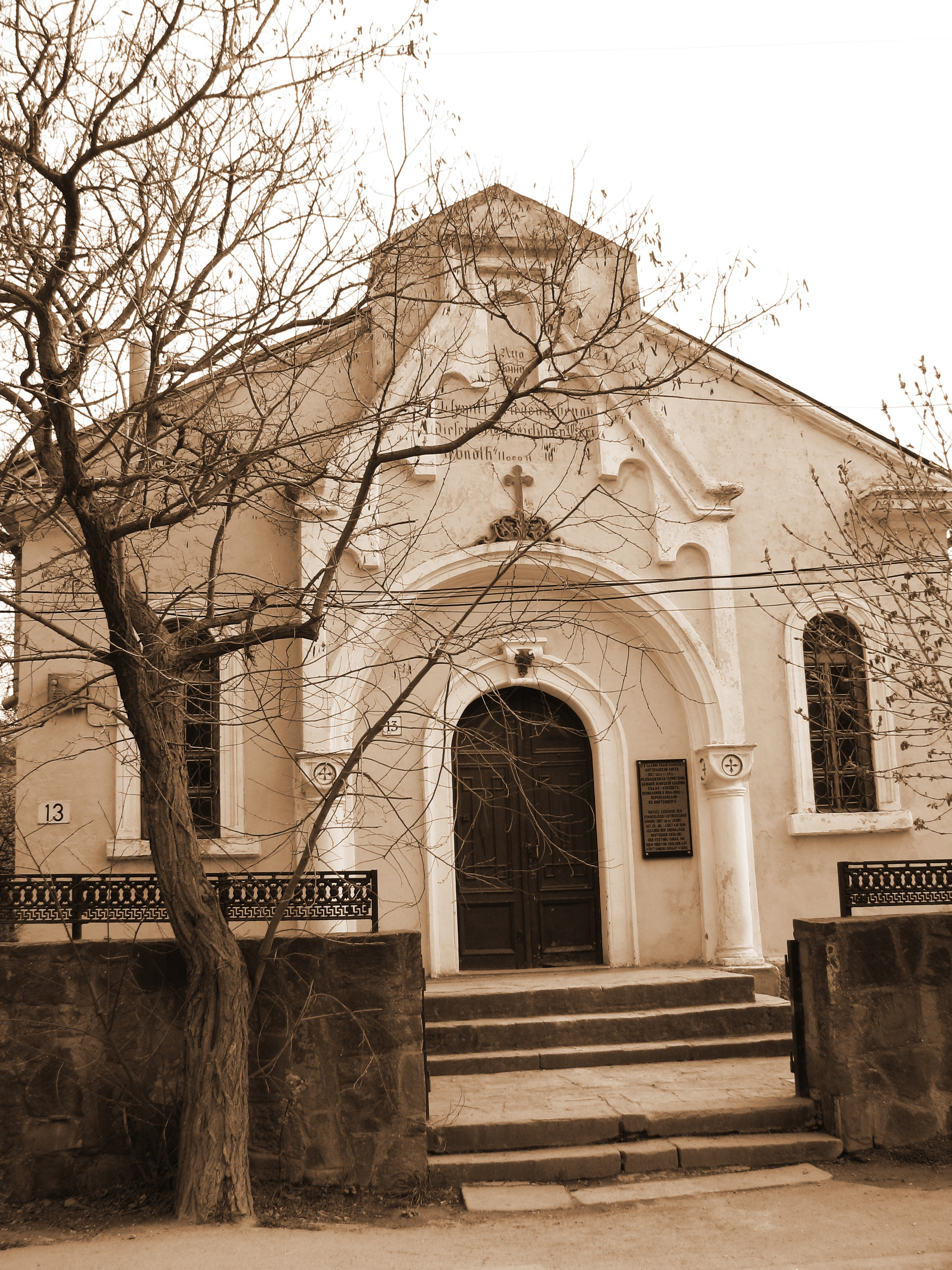
Lutheran Church, 1887 (German colony since 1804)

The Ottomans took control of Soldaia and all other Genoese colonies, as well as the Principality of Theodoro in 1475. Although Sudak was the strategical center of a qadılıq, the smallest administrative unit in the Ottoman Empire, the town lost much of its military and commercial importance, until the Crimean Khanate took over.

In 1771, Sudak was occupied by Rumyantsev's army. In 1783, it definitively passed to the Russian Empire, with the rest of Crimea. Though sometimes contested, it seems that a mass emigration occurred as a result of the ensuing instability in that period. Even Potemkin ordered in 1778 the eviction of the Christian population from Crimea. The town rapidly turned into a small village, and according to the 1805 census, Sudak had just 33 inhabitants.

In 1804, the first Russian school of viticulture was opened there.

The town acquired its present status in 1982.

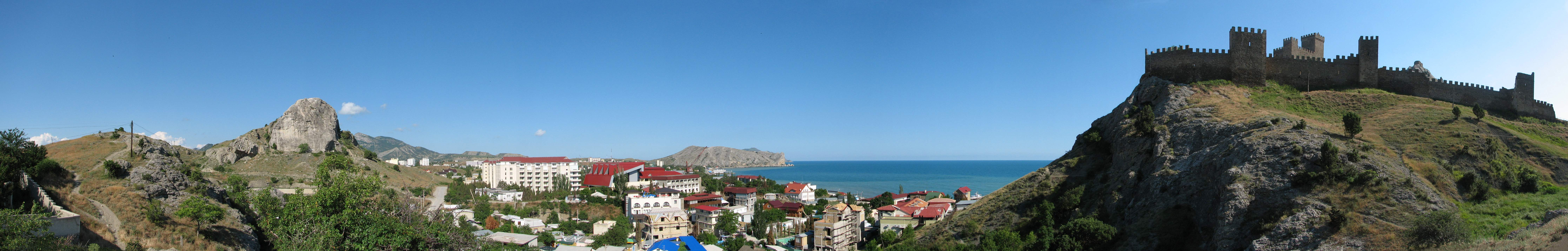
Panorama of Sudak

== Ecclesiastical history ==
=== Byzantine metropolis of Sougdaia ===
It is unknown when the Byzantine see of Sougdaia was established, but it is attested for the first time in 787. It was in the sway of the Patriarchate of Constantinople, where it ranked 35th according to the Notitia Episcopatuum edited by Byzantine emperor Leo VI (r. 886–912). In the 10th century it was promoted to an archbishopric. After merging with the nearby see of Phoulloi towards the end of the 11th century, it was known as Sougdophoulloi. It was raised to metropolitan status in 1275/82.

Its historical bishops were :

- St. Stephen, 787
- Constantine, in 997.

See also Russian Orthodox Diocese of Surozh for Surozh, the old name of the city as an episcopal see in the Russian Orthodox Church, which has been nominally transferred to the Russian Orthodox Diocese in Great Britain and Ireland.

=== Latin bishopric of Soldaia ===
Under Genoese rule, a Latin Catholic diocese of Soldaia was established in 1390, which has had the following residential bishops :

- Bonifacius (19 August 1393 – ? death)
- John Greenlaw, O.F.M. (18 September 1400 – ?)
- Ludovico, O.P. (? – 15 December 1427)
- Agostino di Caffa, O.P. (23 July 1432 – ? death)
- Giovanni di Pera, O.P. (9 July 1456 – ? death)
- Leonard Wisbach, O.P. (6 October 1480 – ? death)

It was suppressed circa 1500 after the Ottoman conquest of the Crimea in 1475.

=== Latin titular metropolitan see of Sugdaea ===
In 1933 the see was nominally restored as titular bishopric of Sugdæa (Sugdaea), which was promoted in 1948 to metropolitan titular archbishopric.

It is vacant for decades, having had a single incumbent :

- Titular Archbishop Thomas Roberts, S.J. (1950.12.04 – 1970.12.07), emeritus as former Metropolitan Archbishop of Bombay (India) (1937.08.12 – 1950.12.04).

=== Latin titular episcopal see of Soldaia ===
In 1933 the diocese was nominally restored as a Latin Catholic titular bishopric.

It has been vacant for decades, having had a single incumbent:

- Titular Bishop José Romão Martenetz, Basilian Order of Saint Josaphat (O.S.B.M.) (1958.05.10 – 1971.11.29), as Auxiliary Bishop of Brazil of the Eastern Rite (Brazil) (1958.05.10 – 1962.05.30); succeeded as Apostolic Exarch of Brazil of the Ukrainians (Brazil) (1962.05.30 – 1971.11.29), later Eparch (Bishop) of São João Batista em Curitiba of the Ukrainians (Brazil) (1971.11.29 – 1978.03.10).

== Demographics ==
As of the 2001 Ukrainian census, Sudak had a population of 29,448. More than half of the population were ethnic Russians. In an addition to the ethnic Russian majority, the city is also inhabited by big Ukrainian and Crimean Tatar minorities, which combined make up 35% of the population. Smaller minority groups include Belarusians, Armenians, Tatars and Poles.

Ethnic groups in Sudak
	percent
Russians	59.23%
Ukrainians	17.57%
Crimean Tatars	17.42%
Belarusians	1.31%
Tatars	0.97%
Armenians	0.47%
Moldovans	0.14%
Poles	0.12%
Azerbaijanis	0.12%

== Notable people ==
- Mahomed Kratov (born 2004), Ukrainian football player
- Zlata Ognevich (born 1986), Ukrainian singer
- Nikolai Ziber (1844-1888), Ukrainian economist

== See also ==
- Gazaria (Genoese colonies) - the name for Genoese communities in Crimea
- List of Catholic dioceses in Ukraine
- Roman Crimea
- Krasnokam‘yanka - Qızıltaş - Krasnokamyenka

== Sources ==
- Vus, Oleh; Sorochan, Serhiy. Early Byzantine Burgs on the Coast of the Taurica and the European Bosporus (regarding the Question of the Military Presence of the Romans in the South-Eastern Crimea in the 4th—6th centuries) 2021. https://www.academia.edu/86219660/Early_Byzantine_Burgs_on_the_Coast_of_the_Taurica_and_the_European_Bosporus_regarding_the_Question_of_the_Military_Presence_of_the_Romans_in_the_South_Eastern_Crimea_in_the_4th_6th_centuries_
- Vus, Oleh. Defense doctrine of Byzantium in the Northern Black Sea region: engineering defense of Taurika and the Bosphorus in the late 4th — early 7th centuries. 2010. https://www.academia.edu/85524504/Defense_doctrine_of_Byzantium_in_the_Northern_Black_Sea_region_engineering_defense_of_Taurika_and_the_Bosphorus_in_the_late_4th_early_7th_centuries
- Sugdea, Surozh, Soldaia in History and Culture of the Ruthenian Ukraine - Scientific conference materials, Kiev-Sudaq, 2002 (prints only) (in Russian)
- Sugdea Collection, Kiev-Sudaq (Академпериодика, 2004) (in Russian)
- Miscellaneous publications by A. Yu. Vinogradov
- Pius Bonifacius Gams, Series episcoporum Ecclesiae Catholicae, Leipzig 1931, p. 428
- Michel Lequien, Oriens christianus in quatuor Patriarchatus digestus, Paris 1740, Vol. I, coll. 1229-1232
- Daniele Farlati-Jacopo Coleti, Illyricum Sacrum, vol. VIII, Venice 1819, p. 126
- Konrad Eubel, Hierarchia Catholica Medii Aevi, vol. 1, p. 457; vol. 2, p. 240
- (Библиотека Якова Кротова) (in Russian)
