= Ostap Pasika =

Ukrainian carver, journalist and public figure (1929–2000)

- Остап Адамович Пасіка
- Born: 25 July 1929; Krovynka, Second Polish Republic (now Ternopil Oblast, Ukraine)
- Died: 9 June 2000 (aged 70); Krovynka, Ternopil Oblast, Ukraine
- Education: Lviv Printing College, University of Lviv
- Occupations: Carver, journalist and public figure

Ostap Adamovych Pasika (Ukrainian: Остап Адамович Пасіка; 25 July 1929 – 9 June 2000) was a Ukrainian carver, journalist and public figure. Member of the National Union of Journalists of Ukraine (1958), honorary member of the Ukrainian Society for the Protection of Historical and Cultural Monuments (1988) and the All-Ukrainian "Prosvita" Society (1999).

== Biography ==
Ostap Pasika was born on 25 July 1929, in the village of Krovynka, Second Polish Republic, now part of the Terebovlia Hromada, Ternopil Raion, Ternopil Oblast, Ukraine.

He worked at the Terebovlia raion printing house. In 1945, he was the organizer and head of a printing house in the village of Strusiv (now in Ternopil Raion).

He graduated from the Lviv Printing College (1950) and University of Lviv (1966). From 1950 to 1966, he worked at the editorial offices of the newspapers "Vilne Zhyttia" (Ternopil) and "Trudova Slava" (Terebovlia).

From 1966, he was in Kyiv: editor at the "Politvydav Ukrainy" publishing house (1966–1967), executive secretary of the Presidium of the Board of the Ukrainian Society for the Protection of Historical and Cultural Monuments (1967-1972), co-organizer of the Museum of the Book and Printing of Ukraine in the Kyiv-Pechersk Lavra (1972–1975), and head of the department at the "Mystetstvo" publishing house (1975–1977).

He died on 9 June 2000, in his native village.

== Creativity ==
From 1977, he focused on his creative work. He is the author of more than 500 woodcarvings on wooden plaques, including lyrical and satirical compositions, and portraits of figures from Ukrainian history, culture, science, and others. He donated a part of his creative work to museums, including 117 pieces to the Terebovlia Museum of History and Local Lore.

His solo exhibitions were held at the Republican House of Writers, the Union of Writers of Ukraine (1989, Kyiv), and at universities and cultural institutions.

Six films are dedicated to Pasika's work; he was the production designer for the 3-part film "More i Ukraina". The illustrated album "Dyvosvit Ostapa Pasiky" (2000, Kyiv) was published.

== Bibliography ==
- Довжанська, М. Він змушував дерево і говорити, і співати // Воля. — 2020. — № 38 (17 верес.). — С. 4.
