= Semeniv, Ternopil Oblast =

Rural locality in Ternopil Oblast, Ukraine

Semeniv Семенів
- Location in Ternopil Oblast
- Coordinates: 49°16′42″N 25°40′30″E
- Country: Ukraine
- Oblast: Ternopil Oblast
- Raion: Ternopil Raion
- Hromada: Terebovlia urban hromada
- Time zone: UTC+2 (EET)
  - Summer (DST): UTC+3 (EEST)
- Postal code: 48108

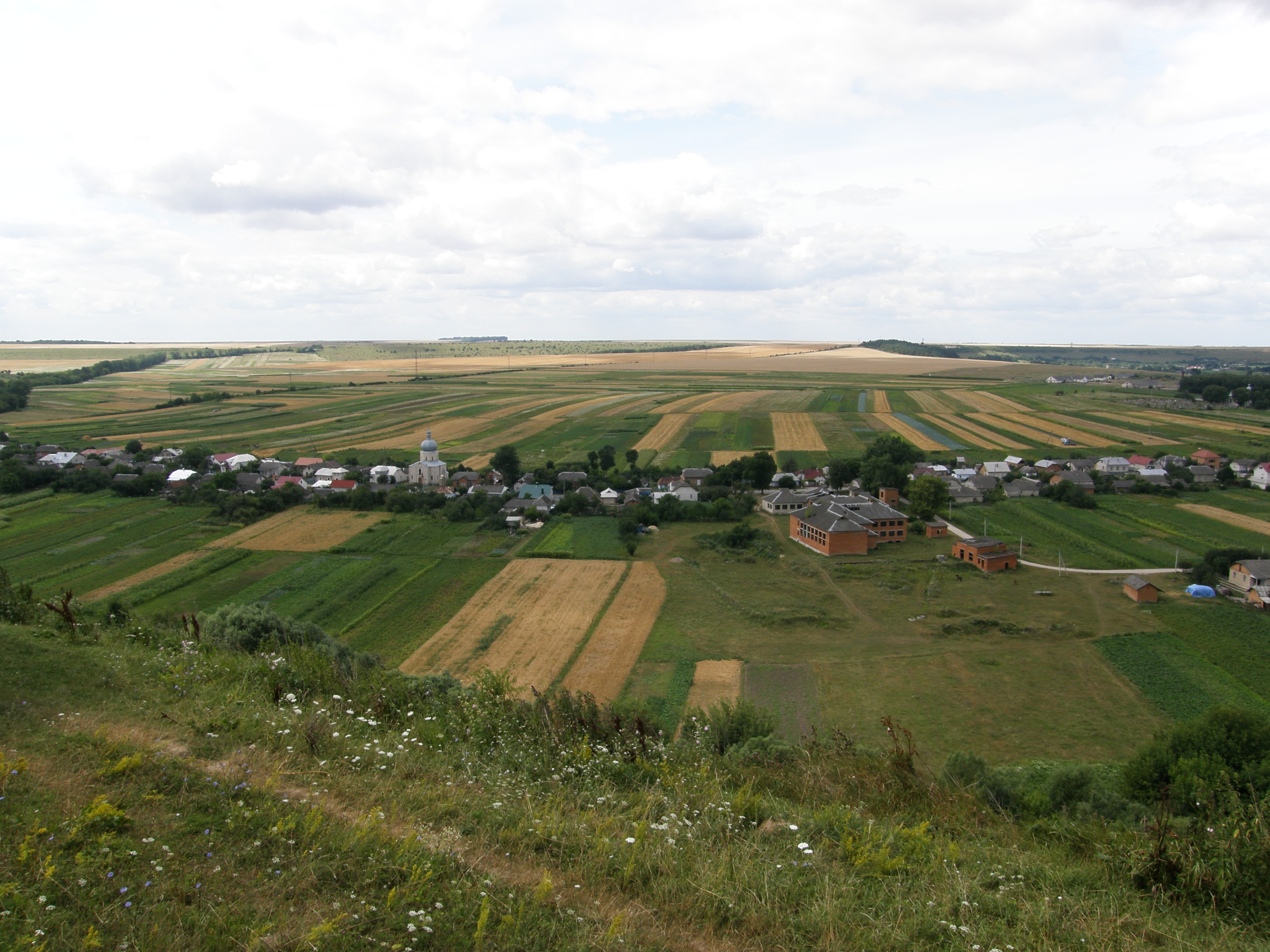
Village of Semeniv

Semeniv (Ukrainian: Семенів) is a village in Terebovlia urban hromada, Ternopil Raion, Ternopil Oblast, Ukraine.

== History ==
The first written mention of the village was in 1588.

After the liquidation of the Terebovlia Raion on 19 July 2020, the village became part of the Ternopil Raion.

== Religion ==
- Two churches of Saints Peter and Paul (1994, UGCC; 2002, OCU).

== Sources ==
- (in Ukrainian) Бігус М., Хаварівський Б., Семенів // Ternopil Encyclopedic Dictionary: in 4 v. / editorial board: H. Yavorskyi and other, Ternopil: "Zbruch", 2008, V. 3: П—Я, S. 240. — ISBN 978-966-528-279-2.
- "Semenów, pow. trembowelski". Geographical Dictionary of the Kingdom of Poland (in Polish). 10. Warszawa: Kasa im. Józefa Mianowskiego. 1889. p. 427.
- "Semenów, pow. trembowelski". Geographical Dictionary of the Kingdom of Poland (in Polish). p. 576.
