= Maliv =

Rural locality in Ternopil Oblast, Ukraine

Maliv Малів
- Location in Ternopil Oblast
- Coordinates: 49°16′58″N 25°40′6″E
- Country: Ukraine
- Oblast: Ternopil Oblast
- Raion: Ternopil Raion
- Hromada: Terebovlia urban hromada
- Time zone: UTC+2 (EET)
  - Summer (DST): UTC+3 (EEST)
- Postal code: 48108

Maliv (Ukrainian: Малів) is a village in Terebovlia urban hromada, Ternopil Raion, Ternopil Oblast, Ukraine.

== History ==
The first written mention of the village was in 1576.

After the liquidation of the Terebovlia Raion on 19 July 2020, the village became part of the Ternopil Raion.

== Religion ==
- Church of the Ascension (1908, brick).

== Sources ==
- (in Ukrainian) Зінчишин І., Смалига М., Малів // Ternopil Encyclopedic Dictionary: in 4 v. / editorial board: H. Yavorskyi and other, Ternopil: "Zbruch", 2005, V. 2: К—О, S. 448. — ISBN 966-528-199-2.
- "Małów, pow. trembowelski". Geographical Dictionary of the Kingdom of Poland (in Polish). 6. Warszawa: Kasa im. Józefa Mianowskiego. 1885. p. 78.
