= Loshniv =

Rural locality in Ternopil Oblast, Ukraine

Loshniv Лошнів
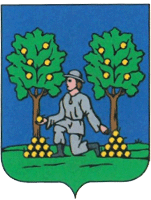
- Coat of arms

- Location in Ternopil Oblast
- Coordinates: 49°21′43″N 25°43′4″E
- Country: Ukraine
- Oblast: Ternopil Oblast
- Raion: Ternopil Raion
- Hromada: Terebovlia urban hromada
- Time zone: UTC+2 (EET)
  - Summer (DST): UTC+3 (EEST)
- Postal code: 48133

Loshniv (Ukrainian: Лошнів) is a village in Terebovlia urban hromada, Ternopil Raion, Ternopil Oblast, Ukraine.

== History ==
The first written mention of the village was in 1410.

After the liquidation of the Terebovlia Raion on 19 July 2020, the village became part of the Ternopil Raion.

== Religion ==
- Two churches of the Nativity of the Blessed Virgin Mary (1879–1880, UGCC; 1992, OCU),
- Saint John of Kent church (1873, RCC).

== Sources ==
- "Łoszniów". Geographical Dictionary of the Kingdom of Poland (in Polish). 5. Warszawa: Kasa im. Józefa Mianowskiego. 1884. p. 739.
- "Łoszniów". Geographical Dictionary of the Kingdom of Poland (in Polish). p. 274.
