= Nova Brykulia =

Rural locality in Ternopil Oblast, Ukraine

Nova Brykulia Нова Брикуля
- Location in Ternopil Oblast
- Coordinates: 49°15′34″N 25°28′50″E
- Country: Ukraine
- Oblast: Ternopil Oblast
- Raion: Ternopil Raion
- Hromada: Mykulyntsi settlement hromada
- Time zone: UTC+2 (EET)
  - Summer (DST): UTC+3 (EEST)
- Postal code: 48145

Nova Brykulia (Ukrainian: Нова Брикуля; Polish: Brykula Nowa) is a village that is located in the Mykulyntsi settlement hromada of Ternopil Raion, in Ternopil Oblast, Ukraine.

== History ==
Nova Brykulia has been known from 1670.

After the liquidation of the Terebovlia Raion on 19 July 2020, the village became part of the Ternopil Raion.

== Religion ==
- Church of the Intercession (1922, stone, rebuilt from a chapel in 1989, OCU).

== Sources ==
- (in Ukrainian) Ткаченко М., Нова Брикуля // Ternopil Encyclopedic Dictionary: in 4 v. / editorial board: H. Yavorskyi and other, Ternopil: "Zbruch", 2005, V. 2: К—О, S. 636. — ISBN 966-528-199-2.
- "Brykula Nowa". Geographical Dictionary of the Kingdom of Poland (in Polish). 1. Warszawa: Kasa im. Józefa Mianowskiego. 1880. p. 394.
