= Zalavie =

Rural locality in Ternopil Oblast, Ukraine

Zalavie Залав'є
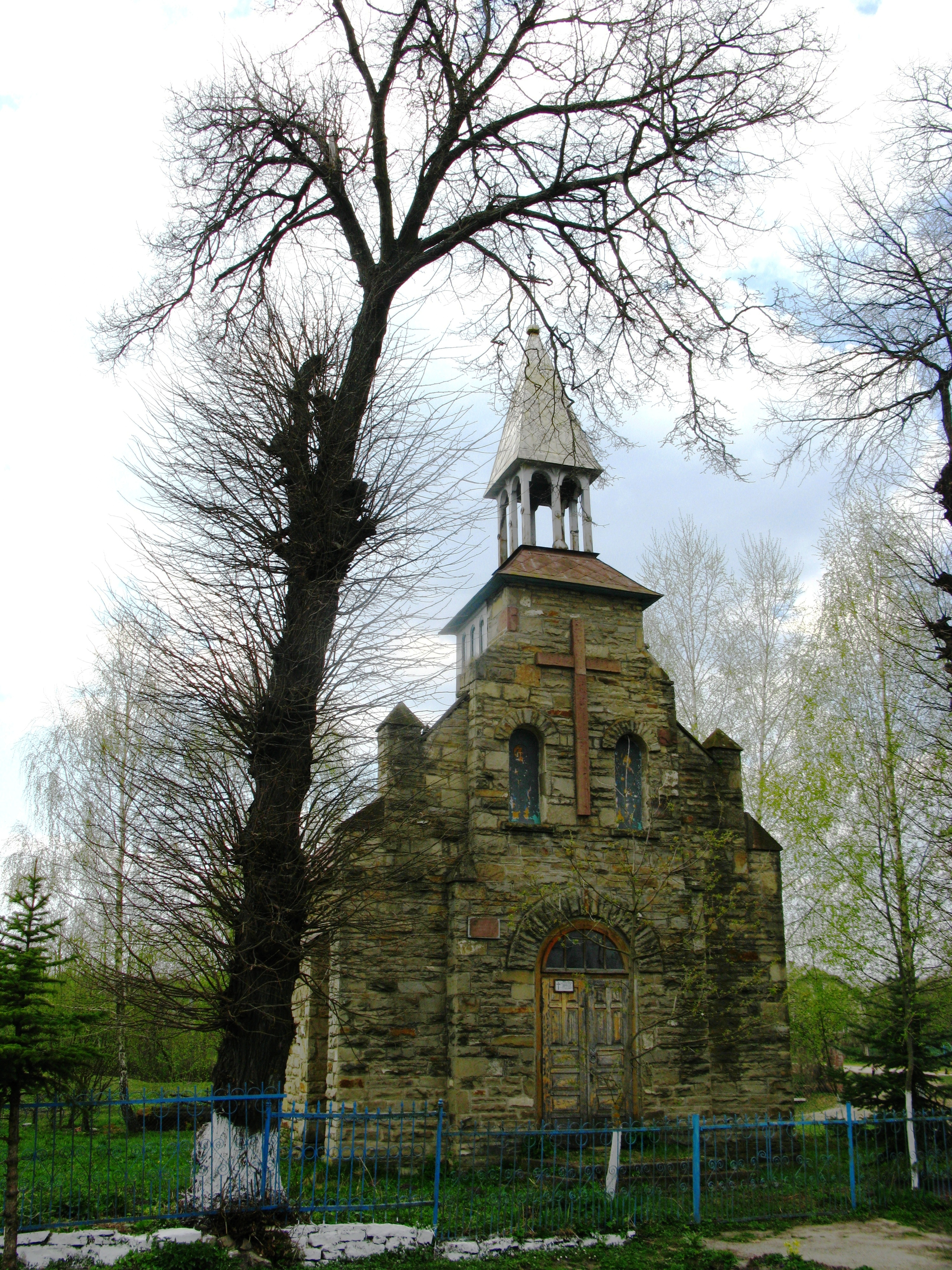
- Church in Zalavie

- Location in Ternopil Oblast
- Coordinates: 49°15′24″N 25°41′55″E
- Country: Ukraine
- Oblast: Ternopil Oblast
- Raion: Ternopil Raion
- Hromada: Terebovlia urban hromada
- Time zone: UTC+2 (EET)
  - Summer (DST): UTC+3 (EEST)
- Postal code: 48174

Zalavie (Ukrainian: Залав'є) is a village in Terebovlia urban hromada, Ternopil Raion, Ternopil Oblast, Ukraine.

== History ==
The first written mention of the village was in 1421.

After the liquidation of the Terebovlia Raion on 19 July 2020, the village became part of the Ternopil Raion.

== Religion ==
- Holy Trinity church (1903),
- chapel (1920s, restored in 1994).

== Sources ==
- (in Ukrainian) Ониськів М., Уніят В., Залав'є // Ternopil Encyclopedic Dictionary: in 4 v. / editorial board: H. Yavorskyi and other, Ternopil: "Zbruch", 2004, V. 1: А—Й, S. 602. — ISBN 966-528-197-6.
- "Załawie (2), wś, pow. trembowielski". Geographical Dictionary of the Kingdom of Poland (in Polish). 14. Warszawa: Kasa im. Józefa Mianowskiego. 1895. p. 351.
