= Pidhaichyky =

Pidhaichyky (Ukrainian: Підгайчики) may refer to the following places in Ukraine:

- Pidhaichyky, Ivano-Frankivsk Oblast, Ivano-Frankivsk Oblast
- Pidhaichyky, Lviv Raion, Lviv Oblast
- Pidhaichyky, Sambir Raion, Lviv Oblast
- Pidhaichyky, Terebovlia urban hromada, Ternopil Raion, Ternopil Oblast, Ternopil Oblast
- Pidhaichyky, Zboriv urban hromada, Ternopil Raion, Ternopil Oblast, Ternopil Oblast
