= Zubiv, Ternopil Oblast =

Rural locality in Ternopil Oblast, Ukraine

Zubiv Зубів
- Location in Ternopil Oblast
- Coordinates: 49°18′8″N 25°37′32″E
- Country: Ukraine
- Oblast: Ternopil Oblast
- Raion: Ternopil Raion
- Hromada: Mykulyntsi settlement hromada
- Time zone: UTC+2 (EET)
  - Summer (DST): UTC+3 (EEST)
- Postal code: 48107

Zubiv (Ukrainian: Зубів; Polish: Zubów) is a village in Mykulyntsi settlement hromada, Ternopil Raion, Ternopil Oblast, Ukraine.

== History ==
The first written mention of the village was in 1410.

After the liquidation of the Terebovlia Raion on 19 July 2020, the village became part of the Ternopil Raion.

== Religion ==
- Two churches of the Nativity of the Blessed Virgin Mary (1867, brick, OCU; 2010, brick, UGCC).

== Sources ==
- "Zubów". Geographical Dictionary of the Kingdom of Poland (in Polish). 14. Warszawa: Kasa im. Józefa Mianowskiego. 1895. p. 670.
