= Druzhba, Ternopil Oblast =

Rural locality in Ternopil Oblast, Ukraine

Druzhba Дружба
- Rural settlement
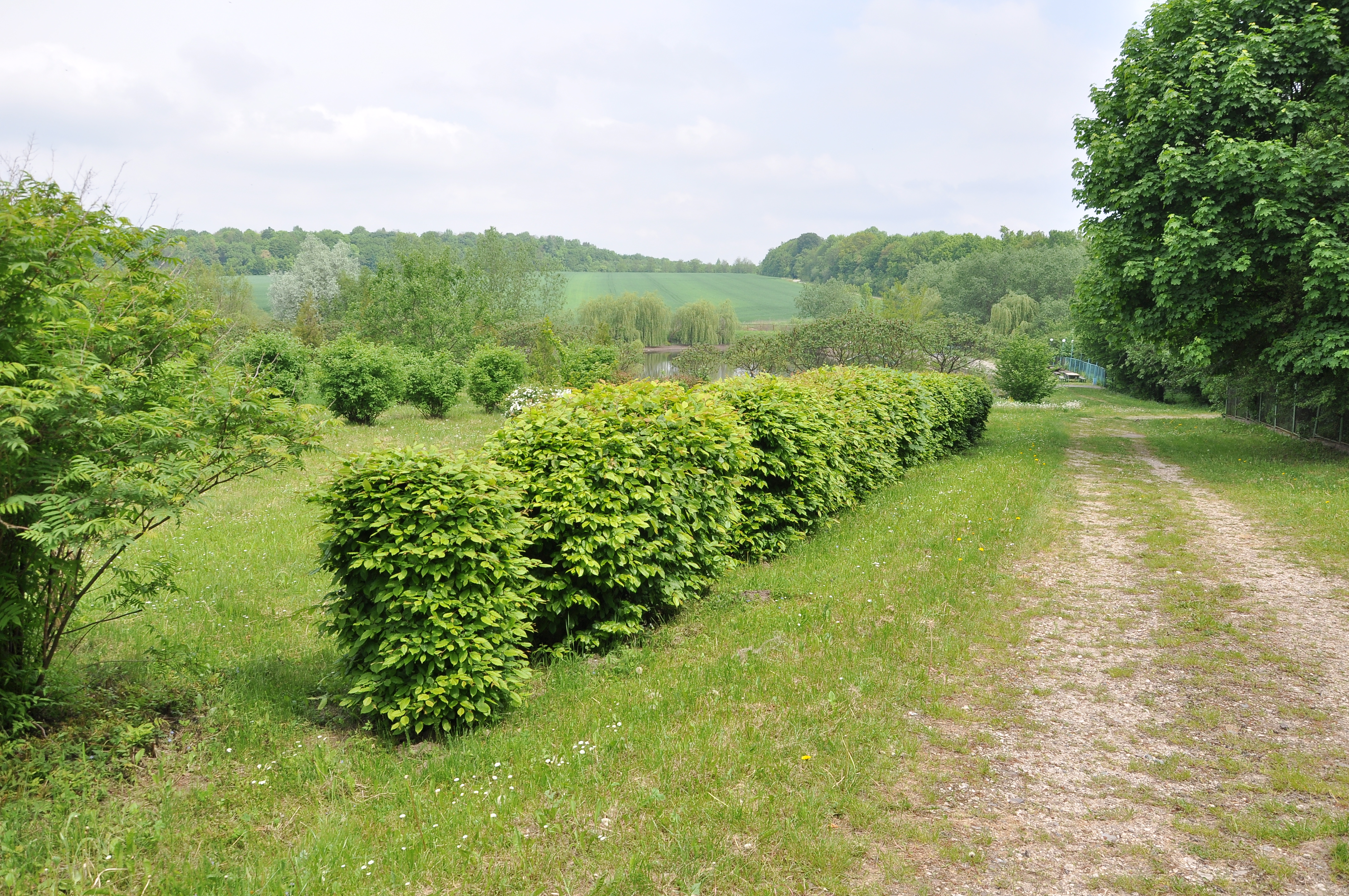
- Interactive map of Druzhba
- Location of Druzhba in Ternopil Oblast Location of Druzhba in Ukraine
- Coordinates: 49°21′39″N 25°38′49″E
- Country: Ukraine
- Oblast: Ternopil Oblast
- Raion: Ternopil Raion
- Founded: 1896
- Town status: 1986

Government
  - Town Head: Ivan Slobodian

Area
  - Total: 2 km^{2} (0.77 sq mi)
- Elevation: 353 m (1,158 ft)

Population (2022)
  - Total: 1,854
  - Density: 930/km^{2} (2,400/sq mi)
- Time zone: UTC+2 (EET)
  - Summer (DST): UTC+3 (EEST)
- Postal code: 48130
- Area code: +380 3551
- Website: http://rada.gov.ua/

Druzhba (Ukrainian: Дружба) is a rural settlement in Ternopil Raion, Ternopil Oblast, western Ukraine. It belongs to Mykulyntsi settlement hromada, one of the hromadas of Ukraine. Its population is 1,647 as of the 2001 Ukrainian census. Current population: 1,854 (2022 estimate).

== History ==
The town was founded in 1896 as the village of Zelena (Ukrainian: Зелена). In 1963, the village was renamed to its current name, and it was upgraded to that of an urban-type settlement in 1986.

Until 18 July 2020, Druzhba belonged to Terebovlia Raion. The raion was abolished in July 2020 as part of the administrative reform of Ukraine, which reduced the number of raions of Ternopil Oblast to three. The area of Terebovlia Raion was merged into Ternopil Raion.

Until 26 January 2024, Druzhba was designated urban-type settlement. On this day, a new law entered into force which abolished this status, and Druzhba became a rural settlement.

== See also ==
- Mykulyntsi, the other urban-type settlement in Terebovlia Raion of Ternopil Oblast
