= Khmelivka, Ternopil Oblast =

Rural locality in Ternopil Oblast, Ukraine

Khmelivka Хмелівка
- Location in Ternopil Oblast
- Coordinates: 49°14′13″N 25°29′37″E
- Country: Ukraine
- Oblast: Ternopil Oblast
- Raion: Ternopil Raion
- Hromada: Mykulyntsi settlement hromada
- Time zone: UTC+2 (EET)
  - Summer (DST): UTC+3 (EEST)
- Postal code: 48145

Khmelivka (Ukrainian: Хмелівка; Polish: Chmielówka) is a village in Mykulyntsi settlement hromada, Ternopil Raion, Ternopil Oblast, Ukraine.

== History ==
The first written mention of the village was in 1646.

After the liquidation of the Terebovlia Raion on 19 July 2020, the village became part of the Ternopil Raion.

== Religion ==
- Two churches of the Intercession (1939, brick, restored in 2001, OCU; 1989, brick, UGCC).

== Sources ==
- (in Ukrainian) Дем'янова І., Уніят В., Хмелівка // Ternopil Encyclopedic Dictionary: in 4 v. / editorial board: H. Yavorskyi and other, Ternopil: "Zbruch", 2008, V. 3: П—Я, S. 549. — ISBN 978-966-528-279-2.
- "Chmielówka (pow. trębowelski)". Geographical Dictionary of the Kingdom of Poland (in Polish). 1. Warszawa: Kasa im. Józefa Mianowskiego. 1880. p. 592.
