= Pidhora, Ternopil Oblast =

Rural locality in Ternopil Oblast, Ukraine

Pidhora Підгора
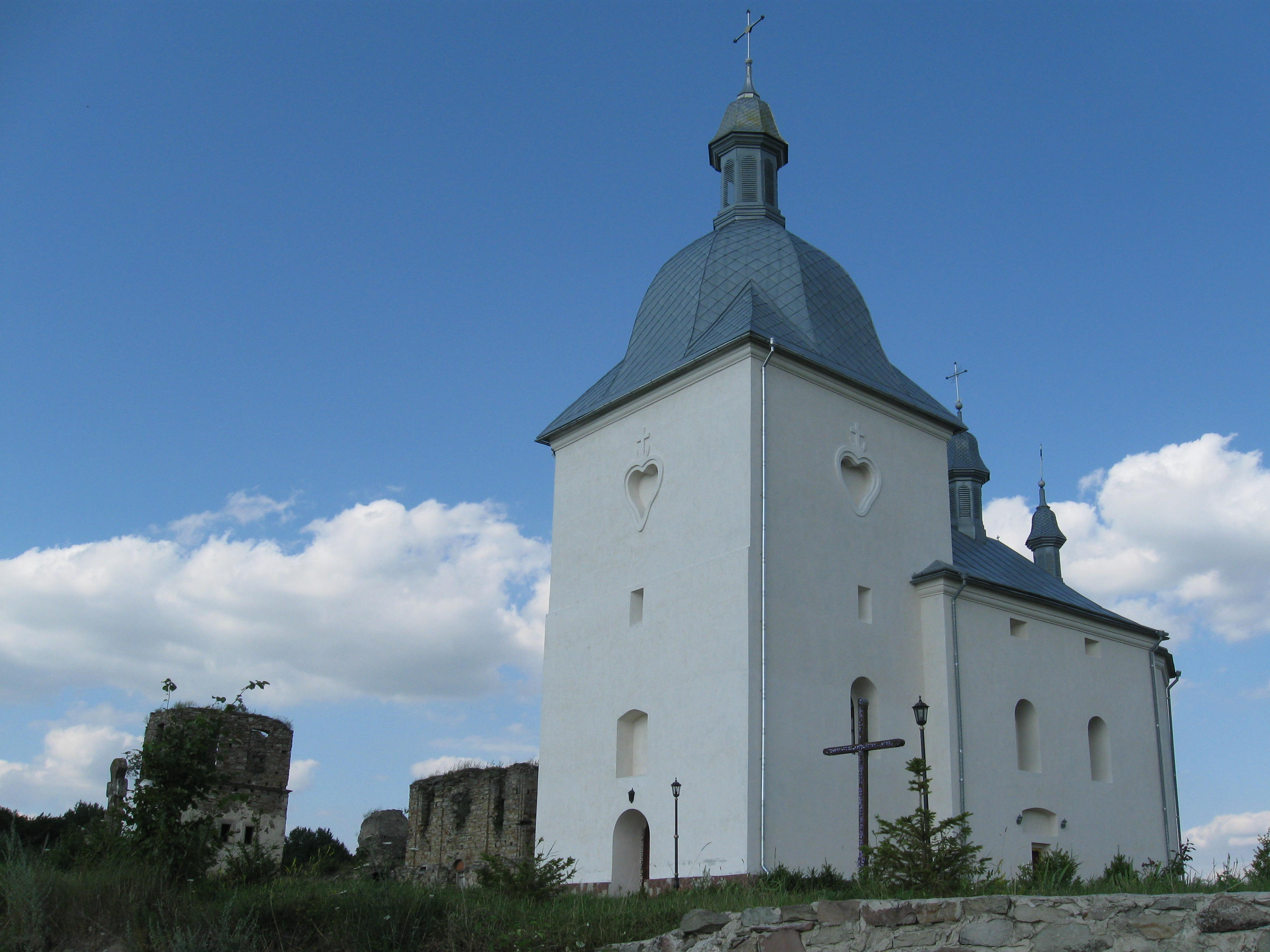
- The Church of the former Pidhora Monastery

- Location in Ternopil Oblast
- Coordinates: 49°16′50″N 25°41′26″E
- Country: Ukraine
- Oblast: Ternopil Oblast
- Raion: Ternopil Raion
- Hromada: Terebovlia urban hromada
- Time zone: UTC+2 (EET)
  - Summer (DST): UTC+3 (EEST)
- Postal code: 48108

Pidhora (Ukrainian: Підгора; until 1939, Pidhirniany) is a village in Terebovlia urban hromada, Ternopil Raion, Ternopil Oblast, Ukraine.

== History ==
In 1650, documents mention a local monastery.

After the liquidation of the Terebovlia Raion on 19 July 2020, the village became part of the Ternopil Raion.

== Religion ==
- Pidhora Monastery (architectural monument of national importance),
- Church of the Basilians (restored in 1993),
- Church of the Nativity of John the Baptist (16th century, restored in 1999).

== Sources ==
- (in Ukrainian) Пиндус Б., Підгора // Ternopil Encyclopedic Dictionary: in 4 v. / editorial board: H. Yavorskyi and other, Ternopil: "Zbruch", 2008, V. 3: П—Я, S. 81. — ISBN 978-966-528-279-2.
- "Podgórzany". Geographical Dictionary of the Kingdom of Poland (in Polish). 8. Warszawa: Kasa im. Józefa Mianowskiego. 1887. p. 379.
