= Zastinoche =

Rural locality in Ternopil Oblast, Ukraine

Zastinoche Застіноче
- Location in Ternopil Oblast
- Coordinates: 49°17′18″N 25°38′57″E
- Country: Ukraine
- Oblast: Ternopil Oblast
- Raion: Ternopil Raion
- Hromada: Terebovlia urban hromada
- Time zone: UTC+2 (EET)
  - Summer (DST): UTC+3 (EEST)
- Postal code: 48175

Zastinoche (Ukrainian: Застіноче) is a village in Terebovlia urban hromada, Ternopil Raion, Ternopil Oblast, Ukraine.

== History ==
The first written mention of the village was in 1410.

After the liquidation of the Terebovlia Raion on 19 July 2020, the village became part of the Ternopil Raion.

== Religion ==
- Two brick churches of St. Nicholas (1894, OCU; 2005, UGCC).

== Sources ==
- (in Ukrainian) Ониськів М., Уніят В., Застіноче // Ternopil Encyclopedic Dictionary: in 4 v. / editorial board: H. Yavorskyi and other, Ternopil: "Zbruch", 2004, V. 1: А—Й, S. 626–627. — ISBN 966-528-197-6.
- "Zaścinocze". Geographical Dictionary of the Kingdom of Poland (in Polish). 14. Warszawa: Kasa im. Józefa Mianowskiego. 1895. p. 439.
