= Zelenche, Ternopil Oblast =

Rural locality in Ternopil Oblast, Ukraine

Zelenche Зеленче
- Location in Ternopil Oblast
- Coordinates: 49°16′22″N 25°41′44″E
- Country: Ukraine
- Oblast: Ternopil Oblast
- Raion: Ternopil Raion
- Hromada: Terebovlia urban hromada
- Time zone: UTC+2 (EET)
  - Summer (DST): UTC+3 (EEST)
- Postal code: 48108

Zelenche (Ukrainian: Зеленче) is a village in Terebovlia urban hromada, Ternopil Raion, Ternopil Oblast, Ukraine.

== History ==
The first written mention of the village was in 1556.

After the liquidation of the Terebovlia Raion on 19 July 2020, the village became part of the Ternopil Raion.

== Religion ==
- Church of the Nativity of John the Baptist (16th century).

== Sources ==
- "Zieleńcze". Geographical Dictionary of the Kingdom of Poland (in Polish). 14. Warszawa: Kasa im. Józefa Mianowskiego. 1895. p. 591.
