= Borychivka =

Rural locality in Ternopil Oblast, Ukraine

Borychivka Боричівка
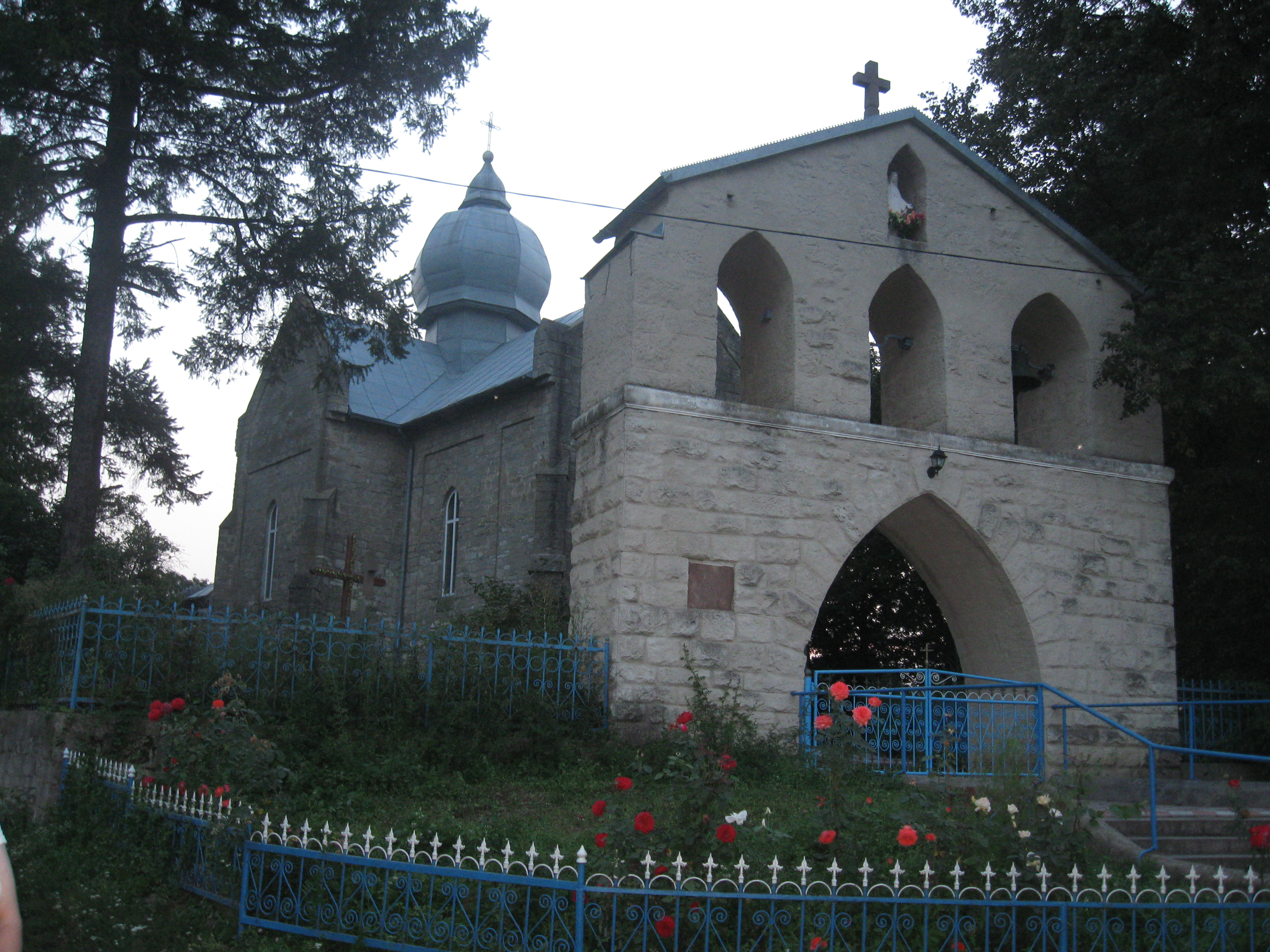
- Church of the Nativity of the Virgin Mary, Borychivka

- Location in Ternopil Oblast
- Coordinates: 49°19′44″N 25°45′58″E
- Country: Ukraine
- Oblast: Ternopil Oblast
- Raion: Ternopil Raion
- Hromada: Terebovlia urban hromada
- Time zone: UTC+2 (EET)
  - Summer (DST): UTC+3 (EEST)
- Postal code: 48100

Borychivka (Ukrainian: Боричівка) is a village in Terebovlia urban hromada, Ternopil Raion, Ternopil Oblast, Ukraine.

== History ==
The first written mention of the village was in 1455.

After the liquidation of the Terebovlia Raion on 19 July 2020, the village became part of the Ternopil Raion.

== Religion ==
- Greek Catholic Church of the Nativity of the Blessed Virgin Mary (1989, rebuilt from the Roman Catholic Church).

== Sources ==
- (in Ukrainian) Уніят В., Боричівка // Ternopil Encyclopedic Dictionary: in 4 v. / editorial board: H. Yavorskyi and other, Ternopil: "Zbruch", 2004, V. 1: А—Й, S. 171. — ISBN 966-528-197-6.
- "Boryczówka". Geographical Dictionary of the Kingdom of Poland (in Polish). 1. Warszawa: Kasa im. Józefa Mianowskiego. 1880. p. 332.
