= Darakhiv =

Rural locality in Ternopil Oblast, Ukraine

Darakhiv Дарахів
- Location in Ternopil Oblast
- Coordinates: 49°17′26″N 25°32′6″E
- Country: Ukraine
- Oblast: Ternopil Oblast
- Raion: Ternopil Raion
- Hromada: Mykulyntsi settlement hromada
- Time zone: UTC+2 (EET)
  - Summer (DST): UTC+3 (EEST)
- Postal code: 48146

Darakhiv (Ukrainian: Дарахів; Polish: Darachów) is a village in Mykulyntsi settlement hromada, Ternopil Raion, Ternopil Oblast, Ukraine.

== History ==
The first written mention of the village was in 1554.

After the liquidation of the Terebovlia Raion on 19 July 2020, the village became part of the Ternopil Raion.

== Religion ==
- Church of the Assumption (1926; brick, OCU),
- Saint John the Baptist church (1903, RCC).

== Sources ==
- (in Ukrainian) Сивульська М., Уніят В., Дарахів // Ternopil Encyclopedic Dictionary: in 4 v. / editorial board: H. Yavorskyi and other, Ternopil: "Zbruch", 2004, V. 1: А—Й, S. 466. — ISBN 966-528-197-6.
- "Darachów". Geographical Dictionary of the Kingdom of Poland (in Polish). 1. Warszawa: Kasa im. Józefa Mianowskiego. 1880. p. 904.
