= Lozivka, Ivanivka rural hromada, Ternopil Raion, Ternopil Oblast =

Rural locality in Ternopil Oblast, Ukraine

Lozivka Лозівка
- Location in Ternopil Oblast
- Coordinates: 49°15′24″N 25°48′43″E
- Country: Ukraine
- Oblast: Ternopil Oblast
- Raion: Ternopil Raion
- Hromada: Ivanivka rural hromada
- Time zone: UTC+2 (EET)
  - Summer (DST): UTC+3 (EEST)
- Postal code: 48137

Lozivka (Ukrainian: Лозівка) is a village in Ivanivka rural hromada, Ternopil Raion, Ternopil Oblast, Ukraine.

== History ==
The first written mention of the village was in 1785.

After the liquidation of the Terebovlia Raion on 19 July 2020, the village became part of the Ternopil Raion.

== Religion ==
- Chapel of the Ascension (1896, UGCC, restored in 1992).

== Sources ==
- (in Ukrainian) Гринівський Т., Лозівка // Ternopil Encyclopedic Dictionary: in 4 v. / editorial board: H. Yavorskyi and other, Ternopil: "Zbruch", 2005, V. 2: К—О, S. 386. — ISBN 966-528-199-2.
