= Humnyska, Ternopil Oblast =

Rural locality in Ternopil Oblast, Ukraine

Humnyska Гумниська
- Location in Ternopil Oblast
- Coordinates: 49°16′41″N 25°39′13″E
- Country: Ukraine
- Oblast: Ternopil Oblast
- Raion: Ternopil Raion
- Hromada: Terebovlia urban hromada
- Time zone: UTC+2 (EET)
  - Summer (DST): UTC+3 (EEST)
- Postal code: 48108

Humnyska (Ukrainian: Гумниська) is a village in Terebovlia urban hromada, Ternopil Raion, Ternopil Oblast, Ukraine.

== History ==
The first written mention of the village was in 1471.

After the liquidation of the Terebovlia Raion on 19 July 2020, the village became part of the Ternopil Raion.

== Religion ==
- Brick churches of the Holy Trinity (1867, OCU; 2005, UGCC).

== Sources ==
- (in Ukrainian) Хаварівський Б., Гумниська // Ternopil Encyclopedic Dictionary: in 4 v. / editorial board: H. Yavorskyi and other, Ternopil: "Zbruch", 2004, V. 1: А—Й, S. 435. — ISBN 966-528-197-6.
- "Humniska (3)". Geographical Dictionary of the Kingdom of Poland (in Polish). 3. Warszawa: Kasa im. Józefa Mianowskiego. 1882. p. 219.
