= Ostaltsi, Ternopil Oblast =

Rural locality in Ternopil Oblast, Ukraine

Ostaltsi Остальці
- Location in Ternopil Oblast
- Coordinates: 49°23′22″N 25°42′57″E
- Country: Ukraine
- Oblast: Ternopil Oblast
- Raion: Ternopil Raion
- Hromada: Terebovlia urban hromada
- Time zone: UTC+2 (EET)
  - Summer (DST): UTC+3 (EEST)
- Postal code: 48131

Ostaltsi (Ukrainian: Остальці) is a village in Terebovlia urban hromada, Ternopil Raion, Ternopil Oblast, Ukraine.

== History ==
Known from the 16th century.

After the liquidation of the Terebovlia Raion on 19 July 2020, the village became part of the Ternopil Raion.

== Religion ==
- Saint Demetrius church (1863, brick, OCU).

== Sources ==
- (in Ukrainian) Лашта В., Смалига М., Остальці // Ternopil Encyclopedic Dictionary: in 4 v. / editorial board: H. Yavorskyi and other, Ternopil: "Zbruch", 2005, V. 2: К—О, S. 693. — ISBN 966-528-199-2.
- "Ostalce". Geographical Dictionary of the Kingdom of Poland (in Polish). 7. Warszawa: Kasa im. Józefa Mianowskiego. 1886. p. 660.
- "Bucniów". Geographical Dictionary of the Kingdom of Poland (in Polish). p. 254.
