= Plebanivka, Ternopil Oblast =

Village in Ternopil Oblast, Ukraine

Plebanivka Плебанівка
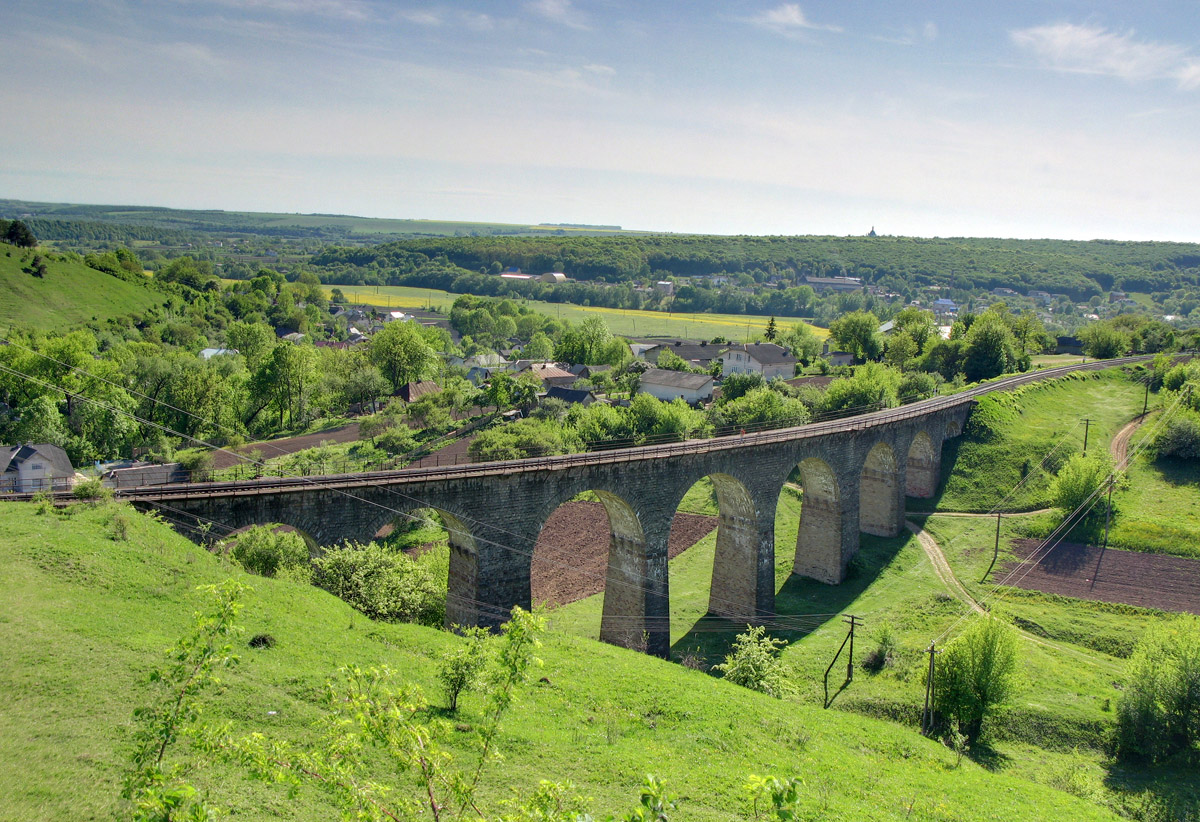
- Viaduk in Plebanivka

- Location in Ternopil Oblast
- Coordinates: 49°16′46″N 25°43′54″E
- Country: Ukraine
- Oblast: Ternopil Oblast
- Raion: Ternopil Raion
- Hromada: Terebovlia Hromada
- Postal code: 48117

Plebanivka (Ukrainian: Плебанівка) is a village in Terebovlia urban hromada, Ternopil Raion, Ternopil Oblast, Ukraine.

== History ==
The first mention of the village dates back to 1425.

After the liquidation of the Terebovlia Raion on 19 July 2020, the village became part of the Ternopil Raion.

== Religion ==
- Greek Catholic churches of Saint John the Apostle (1994, khutir Khatky; 2013)

== Sources ==
- "Plebanówka, pow. trembowelski". Geographical Dictionary of the Kingdom of Poland (in Polish). 8. Warszawa: Kasa im. Józefa Mianowskiego. 1887. p. 243.
