= Nova Mohylnytsia =

Rural locality in Ternopil Oblast, Ukraine

Nova Mohylnytsia Нова Могильниця
- Location in Ternopil Oblast Nova Mohylnytsia (Ukraine)
- Coordinates: 49°12′25″N 25°35′44″E
- Country: Ukraine
- Oblast: Ternopil Oblast
- Raion: Ternopil Raion
- Hromada: Terebovlia urban hromada
- Time zone: UTC+2 (EET)
  - Summer (DST): UTC+3 (EEST)
- Postal code: 48152

Nova Mohylnytsia (Ukrainian: Нова Могильниця) is a village in Terebovlia urban hromada, Ternopil Raion, Ternopil Oblast, Ukraine.

== History ==
The first written mention of the village was in 1497.

After the liquidation of the Terebovlia Raion on 19 July 2020, the village became part of the Ternopil Raion.

== Religion ==
- Two churches of St. Michael (1793, brick, OCU; 1995, wooden, UGCC),
- Saint Joseph church (1865, brick, RCC).

== Sources ==
- (in Ukrainian) Хаварівський Б., Нова Могильниця // Ternopil Encyclopedic Dictionary: in 4 v. / editorial board: H. Yavorskyi and other, Ternopil: "Zbruch", 2008, V. 3: П—Я, S. 636. — ISBN 978-966-528-279-2.
- "Mogilnica al. Mogielnica, wś, pow. trębowelski". Geographical Dictionary of the Kingdom of Poland (in Polish). 6. Warszawa: Kasa im. Józefa Mianowskiego. 1885. p. 581.
