= Stara Brykulia =

Rural locality in Ternopil Oblast, Ukraine

Stara Brykulia Стара Брикуля
- Location in Ternopil Oblast
- Coordinates: 49°15′1″N 25°29′49″E
- Country: Ukraine
- Oblast: Ternopil Oblast
- Raion: Ternopil Raion
- Hromada: Mykulyntsi settlement hromada
- Time zone: UTC+2 (EET)
  - Summer (DST): UTC+3 (EEST)
- Postal code: 48144

Stara Brykulia (Ukrainian: Стара Брикуля; Polish: Brykula Stara) is a village in Mykulyntsi settlement hromada, Ternopil Raion, Ternopil Oblast, Ukraine.

== History ==
The first written mention of the village was in 1670.

After the liquidation of the Terebovlia Raion on 19 July 2020, the village became part of the Ternopil Raion.

== Religion ==
- chapel (1876, brick).

== Sources ==
- "Brykula Stara". Geographical Dictionary of the Kingdom of Poland (in Polish). 1. Warszawa: Kasa im. Józefa Mianowskiego. 1880. p. 394.
