= Kamianka, Ternopil Oblast =

Rural locality in Ternopil Oblast, Ukraine

Kamianka Кам'янка
- Location in Ternopil Oblast
- Coordinates: 49°17′28″N 25°35′37″E
- Country: Ukraine
- Oblast: Ternopil Oblast
- Raion: Ternopil Raion
- Hromada: Mykulyntsi settlement hromada
- Time zone: UTC+2 (EET)
  - Summer (DST): UTC+3 (EEST)
- Postal code: 48146

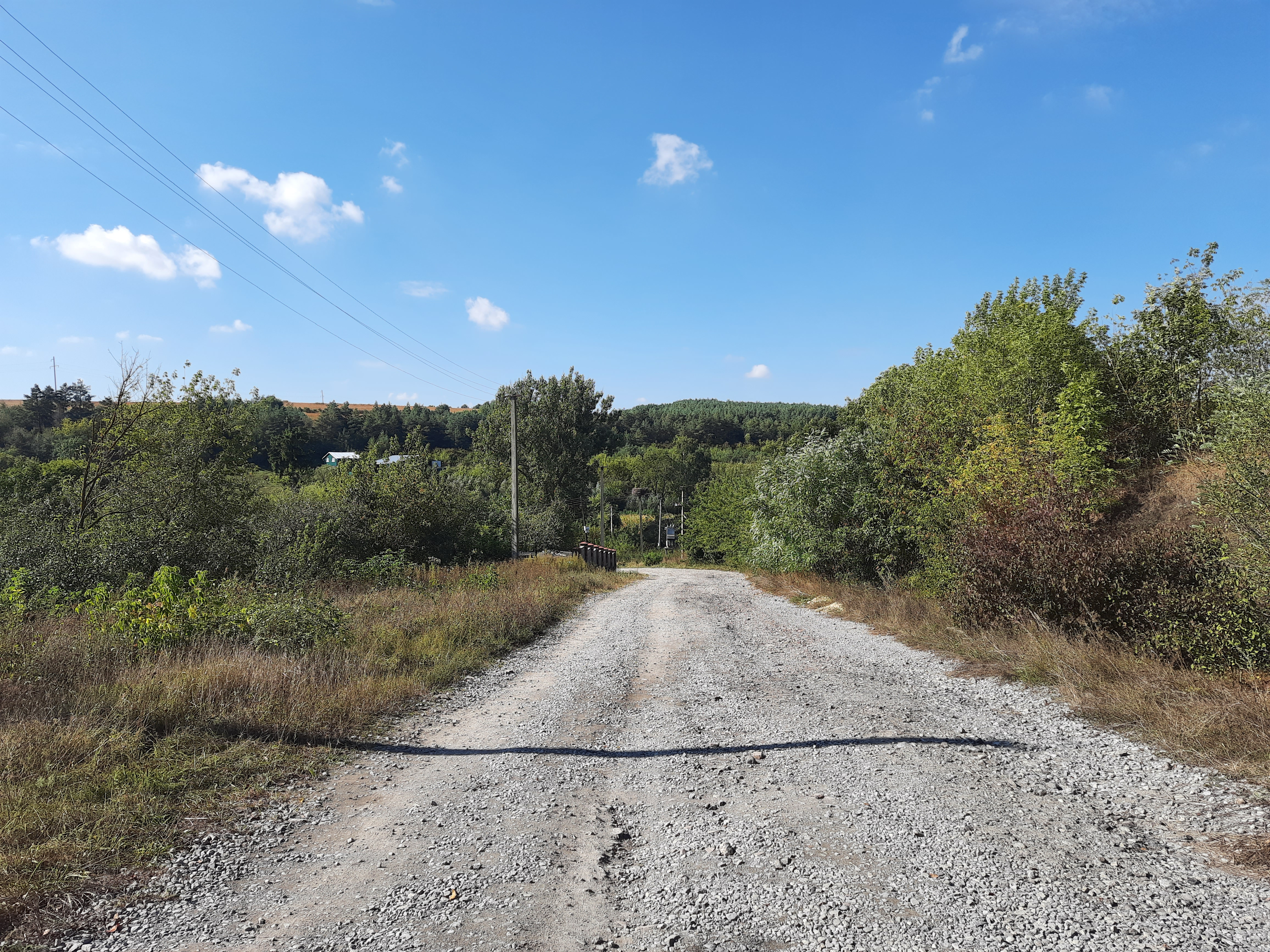

Kamianka (Ukrainian: Кам'янка; Polish: Kamjanka; until 1955 Słobódka Strusowska) is a village in Mykulyntsi settlement hromada, Ternopil Raion, Ternopil Oblast, Ukraine.

== History ==
The first written mention of the village was in 1588.

After the liquidation of the Terebovlia Raion on 19 July 2020, the village became part of the Ternopil Raion.

== Religion ==
- Saints Peter and Paul church (1932–1997, UGCC).

== Sources ==
- "Słobódka Straszowska z Oleandrami, pow. trembowelski". Geographical Dictionary of the Kingdom of Poland (in Polish). 10. Warszawa: Kasa im. Józefa Mianowskiego. 1889. p. 807.
