= Tiutkiv =

Rural locality in Ternopil Oblast, Ukraine

Tiutkiv Тютьків
- Location in Ternopil Oblast
- Coordinates: 49°18′14″N 25°32′12″E
- Country: Ukraine
- Oblast: Ternopil Oblast
- Raion: Ternopil Raion
- Hromada: Mykulyntsi settlement hromada
- Time zone: UTC+2 (EET)
  - Summer (DST): UTC+3 (EEST)
- Postal code: 48146

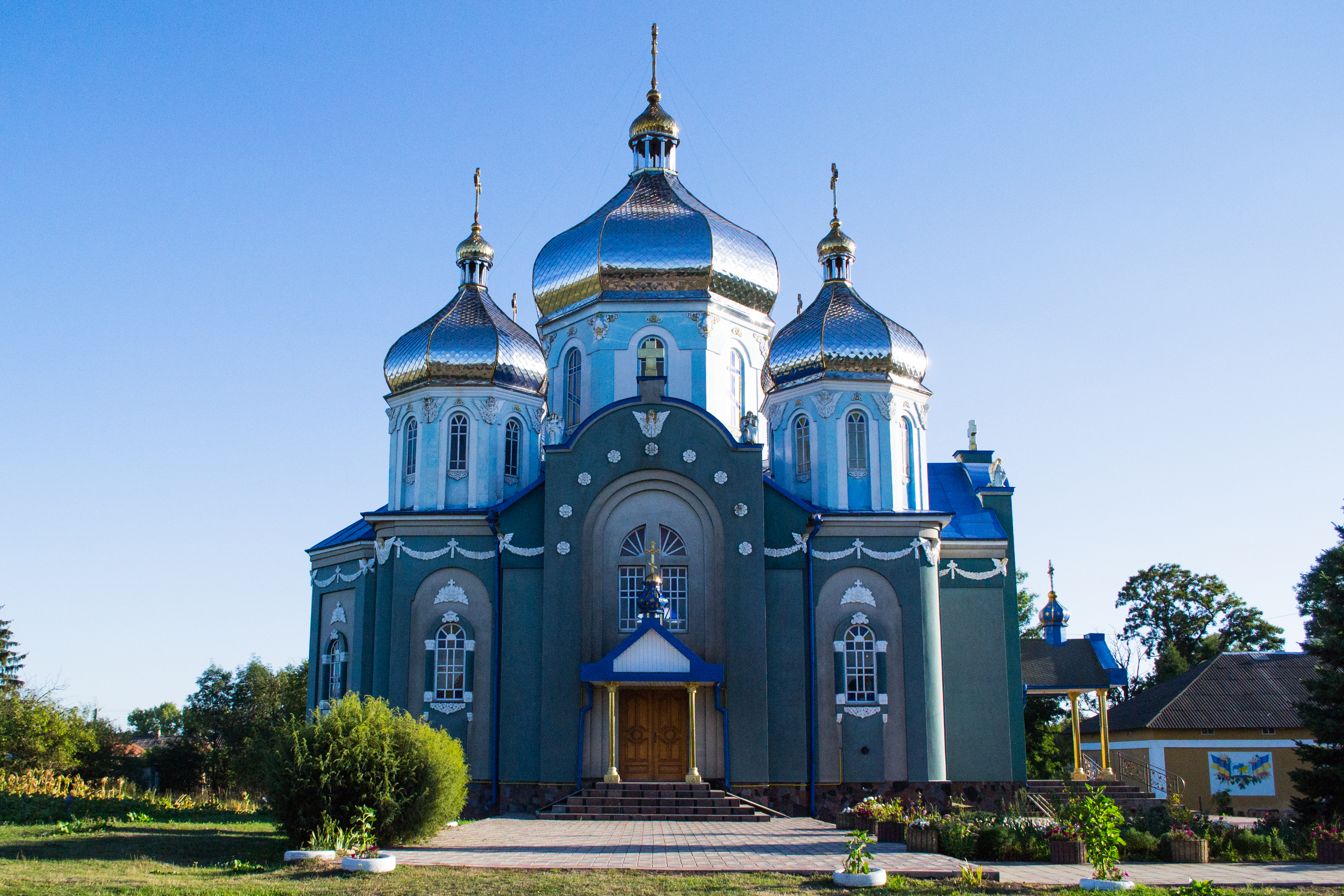
Church of St. John, Tyutkiv

Tiutkiv (Ukrainian: Тютьків; Polish: Tiutków) is a village in Mykulyntsi settlement hromada, Ternopil Raion, Ternopil Oblast, Ukraine.

== History ==
The first written mention of the village was in 1683.

After the liquidation of the Terebovlia Raion on 19 July 2020, the village became part of the Ternopil Raion.

== Religion ==
- Church of the Laying of the Robe of the Blessed Virgin Mary (1998, built by the OCU),
- Church of the Nativity of St. John the Baptist (1991, brick, restored in 1993-1995 from a Roman Catholic church, UGCC).

== Sources ==
- (in Ukrainian) Гуцал П., Сивульська М., Тютьків // Ternopil Encyclopedic Dictionary: in 4 v. / editorial board: H. Yavorskyi and other, Ternopil: "Zbruch", 2008, V. 3: П—Я, S. 480. — ISBN 978-966-528-279-2.
- "Tiutków". Geographical Dictionary of the Kingdom of Poland (in Polish). 12. Warszawa: Kasa im. Józefa Mianowskiego. 1892. p. 343.
