= Ilavche =

Rural locality in Ternopil Oblast, Ukraine

Ilavche Ілавче
- Location in Ternopil Oblast
- Coordinates: 49°21′11″N 25°50′7″E
- Country: Ukraine
- Oblast: Ternopil Oblast
- Raion: Ternopil Raion
- Hromada: Ivanivka rural hromada
- Time zone: UTC+2 (EET)
  - Summer (DST): UTC+3 (EEST)
- Postal code: 48134

Ilavche (Ukrainian: Ілавче) is a village in Ivanivka rural hromada, Ternopil Raion, Ternopil Oblast, Ukraine.

== History ==
The first written mention of the village was in 1410.

After the liquidation of the Terebovlia Raion on 19 July 2020, the village became part of the Ternopil Raion.

== Religion ==
- Saint John the Baptist Church (1873; brick; UGCC).

== Sources ==
- (in Ukrainian) Твердин Д., Уніят В., Ілавче // Ternopil Encyclopedic Dictionary: in 4 v. / editorial board: H. Yavorskyi and other, Ternopil: "Zbruch", 2004, V. 1: А—Й, S. 681. — ISBN 966-528-197-6.
- "Iławcze, pow. trembowelski". Geographical Dictionary of the Kingdom of Poland (in Polish). 3. Warszawa: Kasa im. Józefa Mianowskiego. 1882. p. 265.
