= Verbivtsi, Ternopil Oblast =

Rural locality in Ternopil Oblast, Ukraine

Verbivtsi Вербівці
- Location in Ternopil Oblast
- Coordinates: 49°9′37″N 25°37′49″E
- Country: Ukraine
- Oblast: Ternopil Oblast
- Raion: Ternopil Raion
- Hromada: Terebovlia urban hromada
- Time zone: UTC+2 (EET)
  - Summer (DST): UTC+3 (EEST)
- Postal code: 48155

Verbivtsi (Ukrainian: Вербівці) is a village in Terebovlia urban hromada, Ternopil Raion, Ternopil Oblast, Ukraine.

== History ==
The first written mention of the village was in 1467.

After the liquidation of the Terebovlia Raion on 19 July 2020, the village became part of the Ternopil Raion.

== Religion ==
- Saint Nicholas church (1852, brick, OCU).

== Sources ==
- (in Ukrainian) Уніят В., Вербівці // Ternopil Encyclopedic Dictionary: in 4 v. / editorial board: H. Yavorskyi and other, Ternopil: "Zbruch", 2004, V. 1: А—Й, S. 245. — ISBN 966-528-197-6.
- "Wierzbowiec 1.) al. Wierzbowce, wś, pow. trembowelski". Geographical Dictionary of the Kingdom of Poland (in Polish). 13. Warszawa: Kasa im. Józefa Mianowskiego. 1893. p. 404.
- "Wierzbowiec, wś, pow. trembowelski". Geographical Dictionary of the Kingdom of Poland (in Polish). p. 687.
