= Sushchyn =

Rural locality in Ternopil Oblast, Ukraine

Sushchyn Сущин
- Location in Ternopil Oblast
- Coordinates: 49°22′47″N 25°43′58″E
- Country: Ukraine
- Oblast: Ternopil Oblast
- Raion: Ternopil Raion
- Hromada: Terebovlia urban hromada
- Time zone: UTC+2 (EET)
  - Summer (DST): UTC+3 (EEST)
- Postal code: 48131

Sushchyn (Ukrainian: Сущин) is a village in Terebovlia urban hromada, Ternopil Raion, Ternopil Oblast, Ukraine.

== History ==
The first written mention of the village was in 1512.

After the liquidation of the Terebovlia Raion on 19 July 2020, the village became part of the Ternopil Raion.

== Religion ==
- Two churches of St. George (1863, UGCC; UGCC), and a Roman Catholic church.

== Sources ==
- (in Ukrainian) Бігус М., Ковальков Ю., Сущин // Ternopil Encyclopedic Dictionary: in 4 v. / editorial board: H. Yavorskyi and other, Ternopil: "Zbruch", 2008, V. 3: П—Я, S. 376. — ISBN 978-966-528-279-2.
- "Suszczyn". Geographical Dictionary of the Kingdom of Poland (in Polish). 11. Warszawa: Kasa im. Józefa Mianowskiego. 1890. p. 606.
