= Rizdviany =

Rizdviany is a name of several populated places in Ukraine.

It may refer to:

- Rizdviany, Ivano-Frankivsk Oblast, a village in Burshtyn urban hromada, Ivano-Frankivsk Raion
- Rizdviany, Ternopil Oblast, a village in Mykulyntsi settlement hromada, Ternopil Raion
