= Sorotske =

Rural locality in Ternopil Oblast, Ukraine

Sorotske Сороцьке
- Location in Ternopil Oblast
- Coordinates: 49°22′42″N 25°50′44″E
- Country: Ukraine
- Oblast: Ternopil Oblast
- Raion: Ternopil Raion
- Hromada: Ivanivka rural hromada
- Time zone: UTC+2 (EET)
  - Summer (DST): UTC+3 (EEST)
- Postal code: 47620

Sorotske (Ukrainian: Сороцьке) is a village in Ivanivka rural hromada, Ternopil Raion, Ternopil Oblast, Ukraine.

== History ==
The first written mention of the village was in 1423.

After the liquidation of the Terebovlia Raion on 19 July 2020, the village became part of the Ternopil Raion.

== Religion ==
- Church of the Intercession (1863, brick, UGCC),
- Church of Our Lady of Perpetual Help (1907, architect Michał Kowalczuk, RCC).

== Sources ==
- (in Ukrainian) Хаварівський Б., Сороцьке // Ternopil Encyclopedic Dictionary: in 4 v. / editorial board: H. Yavorskyi and other, Ternopil: "Zbruch", 2008, V. 3: П—Я, S. 317. — ISBN 978-966-528-279-2.
- "Sorocko". Geographical Dictionary of the Kingdom of Poland (in Polish). 11. Warszawa: Kasa im. Józefa Mianowskiego. 1890. p. 81.
