= Mshanets, Terebovlia urban hromada, Ternopil Raion, Ternopil Oblast =

Rural locality in Ternopil Oblast, Ukraine

Mshanets Мшанець
- Location in Ternopil Oblast
- Coordinates: 49°13′46″N 25°46′45″E
- Country: Ukraine
- Oblast: Ternopil Oblast
- Raion: Ternopil Raion
- Hromada: Terebovlia urban hromada
- Time zone: UTC+2 (EET)
  - Summer (DST): UTC+3 (EEST)
- Postal code: 48161

Mshanets (Ukrainian: Мшанець) is a village in Terebovlia urban hromada, Ternopil Raion, Ternopil Oblast, Ukraine.

== History ==
The first written mention of the village was in 1546.

After the liquidation of the Terebovlia Raion on 19 July 2020, the village became part of the Ternopil Raion.

== Religion ==
- Saint Demetrius church (1905, brick, restored in 2012, UGCC).

== Sources ==
- (in Ukrainian) Ковальчук М., Лашта В., Мшанець // Ternopil Encyclopedic Dictionary: in 4 v. / editorial board: H. Yavorskyi and other, Ternopil: "Zbruch", 2005, V. 2: К—О, S. 583. — ISBN 966-528-199-2.
- Сивицький Д. Нариси з історії села Мшанець. — Т.: 2004.
- "Mszaniec, 1.) wś, powiat husiatyński". Geographical Dictionary of the Kingdom of Poland (in Polish). 6. Warszawa: Kasa im. Józefa Mianowskiego. 1885. p. 785.
- "Mszaniec 2.) wś, powiat husiatyński". Geographical Dictionary of the Kingdom of Poland (in Polish). p. 360.
