= Kobylovoloky =

Rural locality in Ternopil Oblast, Ukraine

Kobylovoloky Кобиловолоки
- Location in Ternopil Oblast
- Coordinates: 49°11′21″N 25°46′51″E
- Country: Ukraine
- Oblast: Ternopil Oblast
- Raion: Ternopil Raion
- Hromada: Terebovlia urban hromada
- Time zone: UTC+2 (EET)
  - Summer (DST): UTC+3 (EEST)
- Postal code: 48164

Kobylovoloky (Ukrainian: Кобиловолоки) is a village in Terebovlia urban hromada, Ternopil Raion, Ternopil Oblast, Ukraine.

== History ==
The first written mention of the village was in 1394.

After the liquidation of the Terebovlia Raion on 19 July 2020, the village became part of the Ternopil Raion.

== Religion ==
- Church of the Resurrection (1882, brick, OCU),
- the church is not functioning (1882, RCC).

== Sources ==
- (in Ukrainian) Свідерська Я., Уніят В., Кобиловолоки // Ternopil Encyclopedic Dictionary: in 4 v. / editorial board: H. Yavorskyi and other, Ternopil: "Zbruch", 2005, V. 2: К—О, S. 103. — ISBN 966-528-199-2.
- "Kobyłowłoki". Geographical Dictionary of the Kingdom of Poland (in Polish). 4. Warszawa: Kasa im. Józefa Mianowskiego. 1883. p. 222.
