= Stara Mohylnytsia =

Rural locality in Ternopil Oblast, Ukraine

Stara Mohylnytsia Стара Могильниця
- Location in Ternopil Oblast
- Coordinates: 49°11′35″N 25°37′37″E
- Country: Ukraine
- Oblast: Ternopil Oblast
- Raion: Ternopil Raion
- Hromada: Terebovlia urban hromada
- Time zone: UTC+2 (EET)
  - Summer (DST): UTC+3 (EEST)
- Postal code: 48152

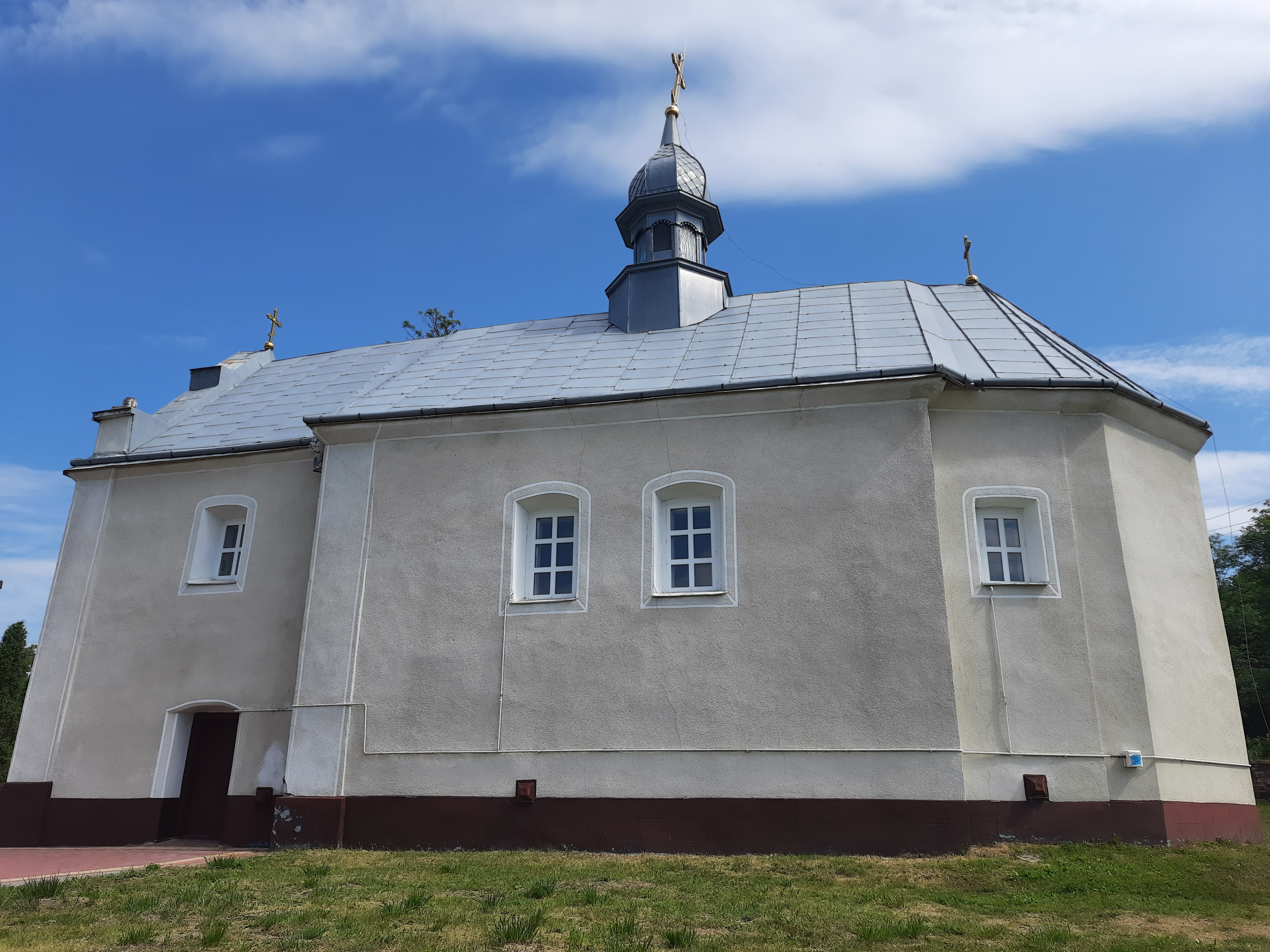
Church of the Holy Trinity, Stara Mohylnytsia village, Ternopil district, Ternopil region

Stara Mohylnytsia (Ukrainian: Стара Могильниця) is a village in Terebovlia urban hromada, Ternopil Raion, Ternopil Oblast, Ukraine.

== History ==
The first written mention of the village was in 1467.

After the liquidation of the Terebovlia Raion on 19 July 2020, the village became part of the Ternopil Raion.

== Religion ==
- Holy Trinity church (1720, built of stone, restored in 2010, OCU).

== Sources ==
- (in Ukrainian) Хаварівський Б., Стара Могильниця // Ternopil Encyclopedic Dictionary: in 4 v. / editorial board: H. Yavorskyi and other, Ternopil: "Zbruch", 2008, V. 3: П—Я, S. 330—331. — ISBN 978-966-528-279-2.
- "Mogilnica, al. Mogielnica, wś, pow. trembowelski". Geographical Dictionary of the Kingdom of Poland (in Polish). 6. Warszawa: Kasa im. Józefa Mianowskiego. 1885. p. 581.
