= Slobidka, Terebovlia urban hromada, Ternopil Raion, Ternopil Oblast =

Rural locality in Ternopil Oblast, Ukraine

Slobidka Слобідка
- Location in Ternopil Oblast
- Coordinates: 49°12′4″N 25°42′6″E
- Country: Ukraine
- Oblast: Ternopil Oblast
- Raion: Ternopil Raion
- Hromada: Terebovlia urban hromada
- Time zone: UTC+2 (EET)
  - Summer (DST): UTC+3 (EEST)
- Postal code: 48163

Slobidka (Ukrainian: Слобідка) is a village in Terebovlia urban hromada, Ternopil Raion, Ternopil Oblast, Ukraine.

== History ==
The first written mention of the village was in 1497.

After the liquidation of the Terebovlia Raion on 19 July 2020, the village became part of the Ternopil Raion.

== Religion ==
- Saints Peter and Paul church (1925, brick, UGCC, reconstructed in 1990 from a Roman Catholic church).

== Sources ==
- (in Ukrainian) Петрів І., Уніят В., Слобідка // Ternopil Encyclopedic Dictionary: in 4 v. / editorial board: H. Yavorskyi and other, Ternopil: "Zbruch", 2008, V. 3: П—Я, S. 290–291. — ISBN 978-966-528-279-2.
- "Słobódka (15)". Geographical Dictionary of the Kingdom of Poland (in Polish). 10. Warszawa: Kasa im. Józefa Mianowskiego. 1889. p. 807.
