= Dvorichchia =

Rural locality in Ternopil Oblast, Ukraine

Dvorichchia Дворіччя
- Location in Ternopil Oblast
- Coordinates: 49°23′12″N 25°31′35″E
- Country: Ukraine
- Oblast: Ternopil Oblast
- Raion: Ternopil Raion
- Hromada: Mykulyntsi settlement hromada
- Time zone: UTC+2 (EET)
  - Summer (DST): UTC+3 (EEST)
- Postal code: 48124

Dvorichchia (Ukrainian: Дворіччя; Polish: Dworiczczia) is a village in Mykulyntsi settlement hromada, Ternopil Raion, Ternopil Oblast, Ukraine.

== History ==
The first written mention of the village was in 1785.

After the liquidation of the Terebovlia Raion on 19 July 2020, the village became part of the Ternopil Raion.

== Religion ==
- Church of Our Lady of Perpetual Help (1905; brick, restored in 1988, UGCC).

== Sources ==
- (in Ukrainian) Уніят В., Дворіччя // Ternopil Encyclopedic Dictionary: in 4 v. / editorial board: H. Yavorskyi and other, Ternopil: "Zbruch", 2004, V. 1: А—Й, S. 469. — ISBN 966-528-197-6.
- "Ludwikówka 5.), pow. tarnopolski". Geographical Dictionary of the Kingdom of Poland (in Polish). 5. Warszawa: Kasa im. Józefa Mianowskiego. 1884. p. 474.
