= Volia, Ternopil Oblast =

Rural locality in Ternopil Oblast, Ukraine

Volia Воля
- Location in Ternopil Oblast
- Coordinates: 49°23′33″N 25°37′48″E
- Country: Ukraine
- Oblast: Ternopil Oblast
- Raion: Ternopil Raion
- Hromada: Mykulyntsi settlement hromada
- Time zone: UTC+2 (EET)
  - Summer (DST): UTC+3 (EEST)
- Postal code: 48171

Volia (Ukrainian: Воля; Polish: Wola Mazowiecka) is a village in Mykulyntsi settlement hromada, Ternopil Raion, Ternopil Oblast, Ukraine.

== History ==
The first written mention of the village was in 1785.

After the liquidation of the Terebovlia Raion on 19 July 2020, the village became part of the Ternopil Raion.

== Religion ==
- St. Nicholas church (1997).

== Sources ==
- (in Ukrainian) Бігус М., Уніят В., Воля // Ternopil Encyclopedic Dictionary: in 4 v. / editorial board: H. Yavorskyi and other, Ternopil: "Zbruch", 2004, V. 1: А—Й, S. 303. — ISBN 966-528-197-6.
- "Mikulińce z Wolą Mazowiecką". Geographical Dictionary of the Kingdom of Poland (in Polish). 6. Warszawa: Kasa im. Józefa Mianowskiego. 1885. p. 412.
