= Derenivka =

Rural locality in Ternopil Oblast, Ukraine

Derenivka Деренівка
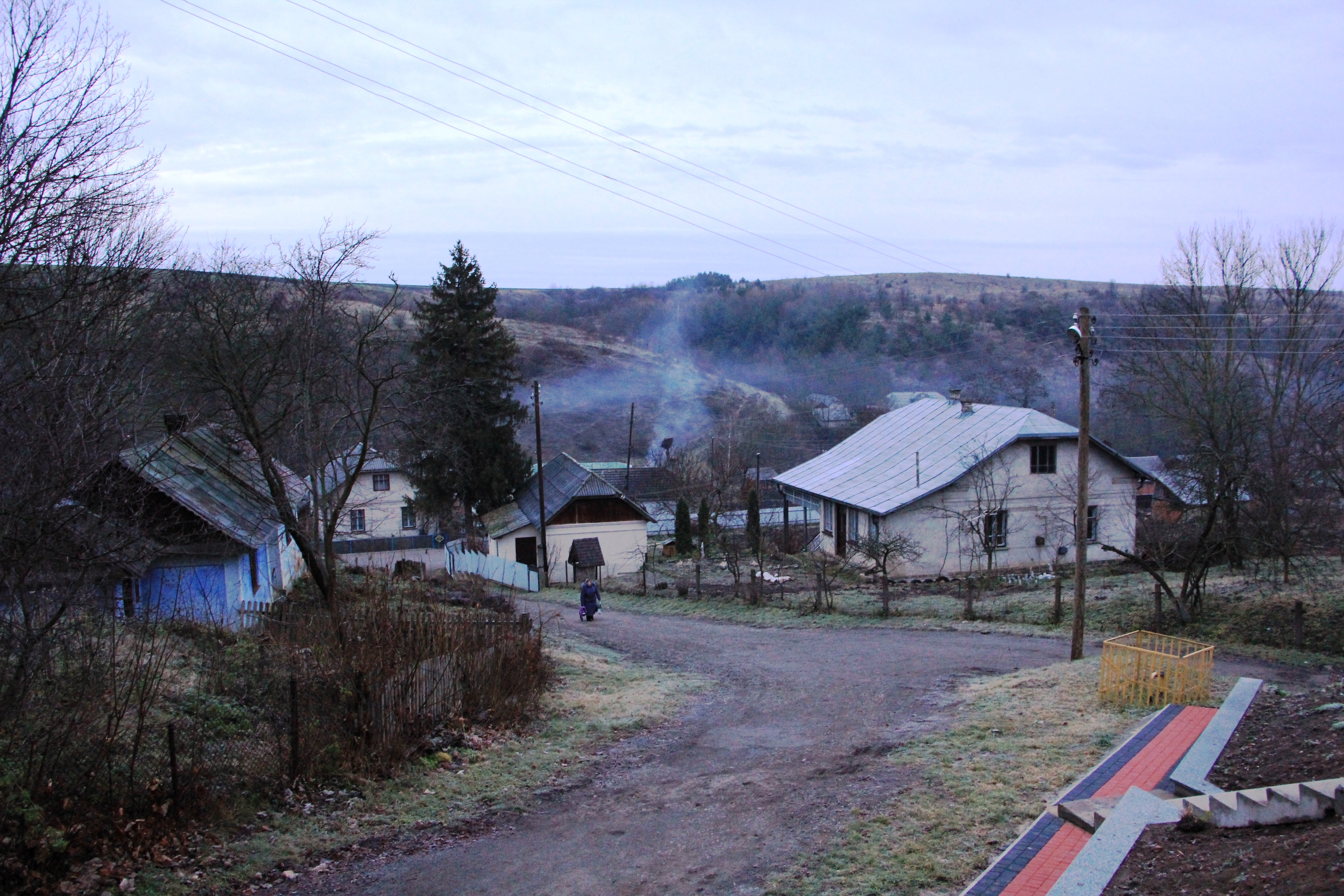
- Derenivka

- Location in Ternopil Oblast
- Coordinates: 49°13′49″N 25°44′51″E
- Country: Ukraine
- Oblast: Ternopil Oblast
- Raion: Ternopil Raion
- Hromada: Terebovlia urban hromada
- Time zone: UTC+2 (EET)
  - Summer (DST): UTC+3 (EEST)
- Postal code: 48173

Derenivka (Ukrainian: Деренівка) is a village in Terebovlia urban hromada, Ternopil Raion, Ternopil Oblast, Ukraine.

== History ==
The first written mention of the village was in 1565.

After the liquidation of the Terebovlia Raion on 19 July 2020, the village became part of the Ternopil Raion.

== Religion ==
- Church of the Intercession (1998, UGCC).

== Sources ==
- "Dereniówka". Geographical Dictionary of the Kingdom of Poland (in Polish). 2. Warszawa: Kasa im. Józefa Mianowskiego. 1881. p. 5.
