= Dovhe, Ternopil Oblast =

Rural locality in Ternopil Oblast, Ukraine

Dovhe Довге
- Location in Ternopil Oblast
- Coordinates: 49°13′13″N 25°43′20″E
- Country: Ukraine
- Oblast: Ternopil Oblast
- Raion: Ternopil Raion
- Hromada: Terebovlia urban hromada
- Time zone: UTC+2 (EET)
  - Summer (DST): UTC+3 (EEST)
- Postal code: 48163

Dovhe (Ukrainian: Довге) is a village in Terebovlia urban hromada, Ternopil Raion, Ternopil Oblast, Ukraine.

== History ==
The village exists from 1555.

After the liquidation of the Terebovlia Raion on 19 July 2020, the village became part of the Ternopil Raion.

== Religion ==
- Two churches of St. John the Baptist (1704, wooden; 2007).

== Sources ==
- (in Ukrainian) Уніят В., Довге // Ternopil Encyclopedic Dictionary: in 4 v. / editorial board: H. Yavorskyi and other, Ternopil: "Zbruch", 2004, V. 1: А—Й, 696 s. — ISBN 966-528-197-6.
- "Dołhe 3.) z Hrycówką, pow. trembowelski". Geographical Dictionary of the Kingdom of Poland (in Polish). 2. Warszawa: Kasa im. Józefa Mianowskiego. 1881. p. 105.
