= Kryvky, Ternopil Oblast =

Rural locality in Ternopil Oblast, Ukraine

Kryvky Кривки
- Location in Ternopil Oblast
- Coordinates: 49°22′33″N 25°36′45″E
- Country: Ukraine
- Oblast: Ternopil Oblast
- Raion: Ternopil Raion
- Hromada: Mykulyntsi settlement hromada
- Time zone: UTC+2 (EET)
  - Summer (DST): UTC+3 (EEST)
- Postal code: 48120

Kryvky (Ukrainian: Кривки; Polish: Krzywki) is a village in Mykulyntsi settlement hromada, Ternopil Raion, Ternopil Oblast, Ukraine.

== History ==
The village has been known from the 16th century.

After the liquidation of the Terebovlia Raion on 19 July 2020, the village became part of the Ternopil Raion.

== Religion ==
- Saint Anthony of the Caves church (1902, UGCC).

== Sources ==
- (in Ukrainian) Уніят В., Кривки // Ternopil Encyclopedic Dictionary: in 4 v. / editorial board: H. Yavorskyi and other, Ternopil: "Zbruch", 2005, V. 2: К—О, S. 236. — ISBN 966-528-199-2.
- "Krzywki". Geographical Dictionary of the Kingdom of Poland (in Polish). 4. Warszawa: Kasa im. Józefa Mianowskiego. 1883. p. 809.
