= Ivanivka, Ivanivka rural hromada, Ternopil Raion, Ternopil Oblast =

Rural locality in Ternopil Oblast, Ukraine

Ivanivka Іванівка
- Location in Ternopil Oblast
- Coordinates: 49°16′28″N 25°49′8″E
- Country: Ukraine
- Oblast: Ternopil Oblast
- Raion: Ternopil Raion
- Hromada: Ivanivka rural hromada
- Time zone: UTC+2 (EET)
  - Summer (DST): UTC+3 (EEST)
- Postal code: 48137

Ivanivka (Ukrainian: Іванівка) is a village in Ivanivka rural hromada, Ternopil Raion, Ternopil Oblast, Ukraine.

== History ==
The first written mention of the village was in 1576.

After the liquidation of the Terebovlia Raion on 19 July 2020, the village became part of the Ternopil Raion.

== Religion ==
- Two brick churches of the Nativity of the Blessed Virgin Mary (1892; 2006, 2012, UGCC; 1997, converted from a Roman Catholic church (1895), all repairs were sponsored by the family of A. Bilyk and the private enterprise "Ivanivske", OCU).

== Sources ==
- (in Ukrainian) Турчин С., Уніят В., Іванівка // Ternopil Encyclopedic Dictionary: in 4 v. / editorial board: H. Yavorskyi and other, Ternopil: "Zbruch", 2004, V. 1: А—Й, S. 666. — ISBN 966-528-197-6.
- "Iwanówka (2), z Budami, pow. trembowelski". Geographical Dictionary of the Kingdom of Poland (in Polish). 3. Warszawa: Kasa im. Józefa Mianowskiego. 1882. p. 320.
