= Krovynka =

Village in Ternopil Oblast, Ukraine

Krovynka Кровинка
- Location in Ternopil Oblast
- Coordinates: 49°20′7″N 25°41′8″E
- Country: Ukraine
- Oblast: Ternopil Oblast
- Raion: Ternopil Raion
- Hromada: Terebovlia Hromada
- Postal code: 48135

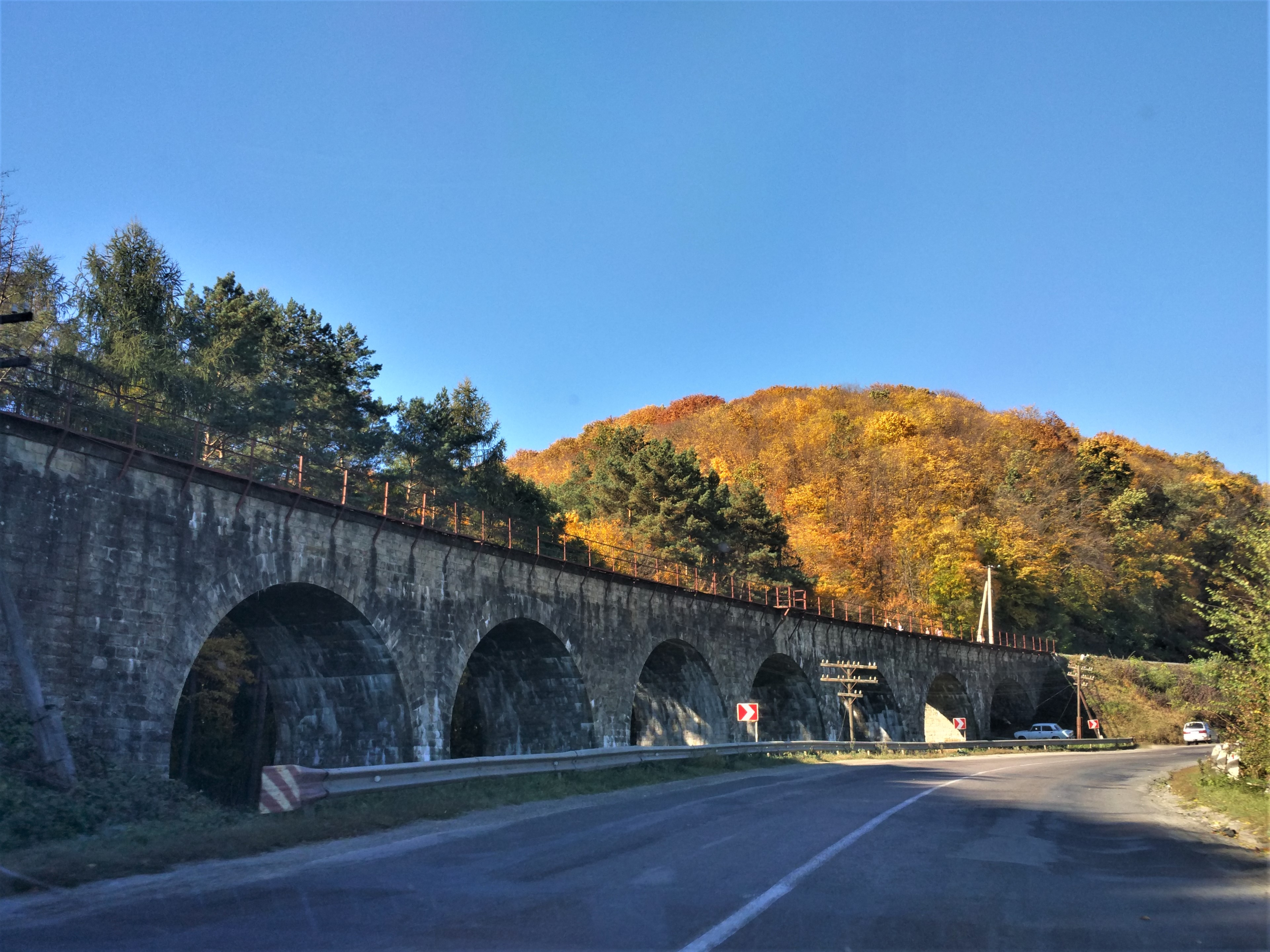
Old viaduct in Krovynka

Krovynka (Ukrainian: Кровинка) is a village in Terebovlia urban hromada, Ternopil Raion, Ternopil Oblast, Ukraine.

== History ==
The settlement is known from 1443.

After the liquidation of the Terebovlia Raion on 19 July 2020, the village became part of the Ternopil Raion.

== Religion ==
- Church of the Intercession (OCU, 1924, brick)

== Sources ==
- "Krowinka". Geographical Dictionary of the Kingdom of Poland (in Polish). 4. Warszawa: Kasa im. Józefa Mianowskiego. 1883. p. 718.
