= Rizdviany, Ternopil Oblast =

Rural locality in Ternopil Oblast, Ukraine

Rizdviany Різдв'яни
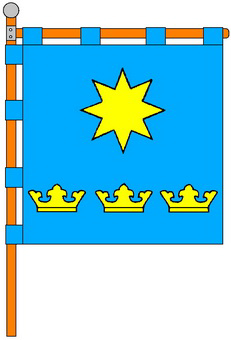
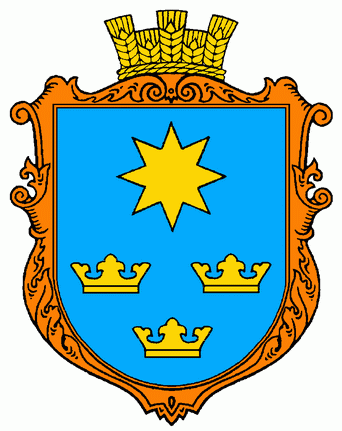
- Flag Coat of arms

- Location in Ternopil Oblast
- Coordinates: 49°19′20″N 25°36′43″E
- Country: Ukraine
- Oblast: Ternopil Oblast
- Raion: Ternopil Raion
- Hromada: Mykulyntsi Hromada
- Time zone: UTC+2 (EET)
  - Summer (DST): UTC+3 (EEST)
- Postal code: 48127

Rizdviany (in 1965–1991 – Svitanok; Ukrainian: Різдвяни; Polish: Ruzdwiany) is a village in Mykulyntsi settlement hromada, Ternopil Raion, Ternopil Oblast, Ukraine.

== History ==
The first written mention is from 1410.

After the liquidation of the Terebovlia Raion on 19 July 2020, the village became part of the Ternopil Raion.

== Religion ==
There are two churches of the Intercession (1887, restored in 2008, OCU; 2010, UGCC)
