= Pidhora Monastery =

Monastery in Pidhora, Ukraine

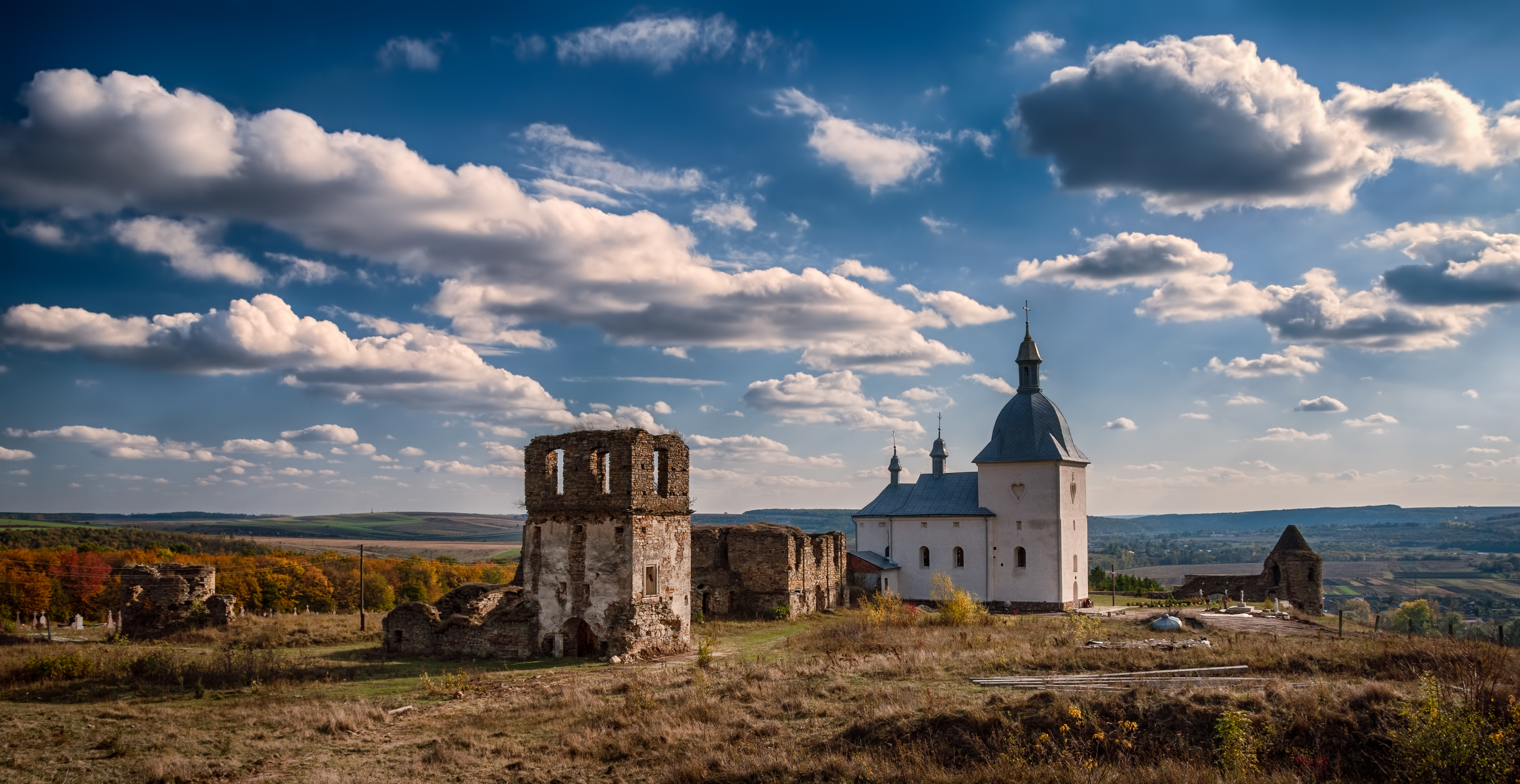
Pidhora Monastery, 2009

The Pidhora Monastery (Ukrainian: Підгорянський монастир) is an architectural monument of national significance, consisting of a complex of religious, residential, and farm buildings where members of the Order of Saint Basil the Great lived. The monastery is located on the high bank of the Seret River near the village of Pidhora in the Ternopil Oblast.

== History and description ==
The first documented mention of the monastery dates back to 1650. However, a letter from King John II Casimir Vasa from 1663 refers to it as "old", which indicates a much earlier origin. Initially, the monastery was wooden and smaller than the present one, fortified with earthen ramparts and surrounded by a palisade. In the mid-17th century, stone buildings were erected on its site.

The monastery complex includes:

- The three-part Church of the Nativity of John the Baptist (24x14 m).
- A massive monastery building (63x10 m), where the first floor housed a kitchen, dining room, and monks' cells, and the second floor had spacious halls.
- The entire complex was surrounded by a trapezoidal defensive wall with four corner towers.

At the beginning of the 18th century, this center was one of the most significant monastic centers in Galicia and Podolia, which also administered monasteries in Zbarazh and Zvyniach (now Chortkiv Raion).

== Educational and cultural role ==
The monastery had a school for young monks, where theological and philosophical courses were taught, and also had a rich library. Interestingly, the northeast tower served not only as a watchtower and alarm tower, but was also used as an astronomical observatory. The origin of the venerated Icon of the Virgin Mary of Terebovlia is associated with this monastery.

== Decline and restoration ==
In 1789, the Austrian authorities closed the monastery. The church was given parish status, and the library books were transferred to University of Lviv and the Buchach Monastery.

During World War I, defensive structures and buildings suffered significant damage, in particular, part of the walls were blown up by Russian troops.

After Ukraine declared independence, parishioners from the villages of Zelenе (Chortkiv Raion) and Pidhora (Ternopil Raion) worked hard to rebuild the monastery church, where services are now held. Unfortunately, the cell building remains in ruins. The complex still has the remains of a defensive wall, entrance gate, and towers, among which the eastern tower is the best preserved, with its original cylindrical ceiling intact.

== Gallery ==
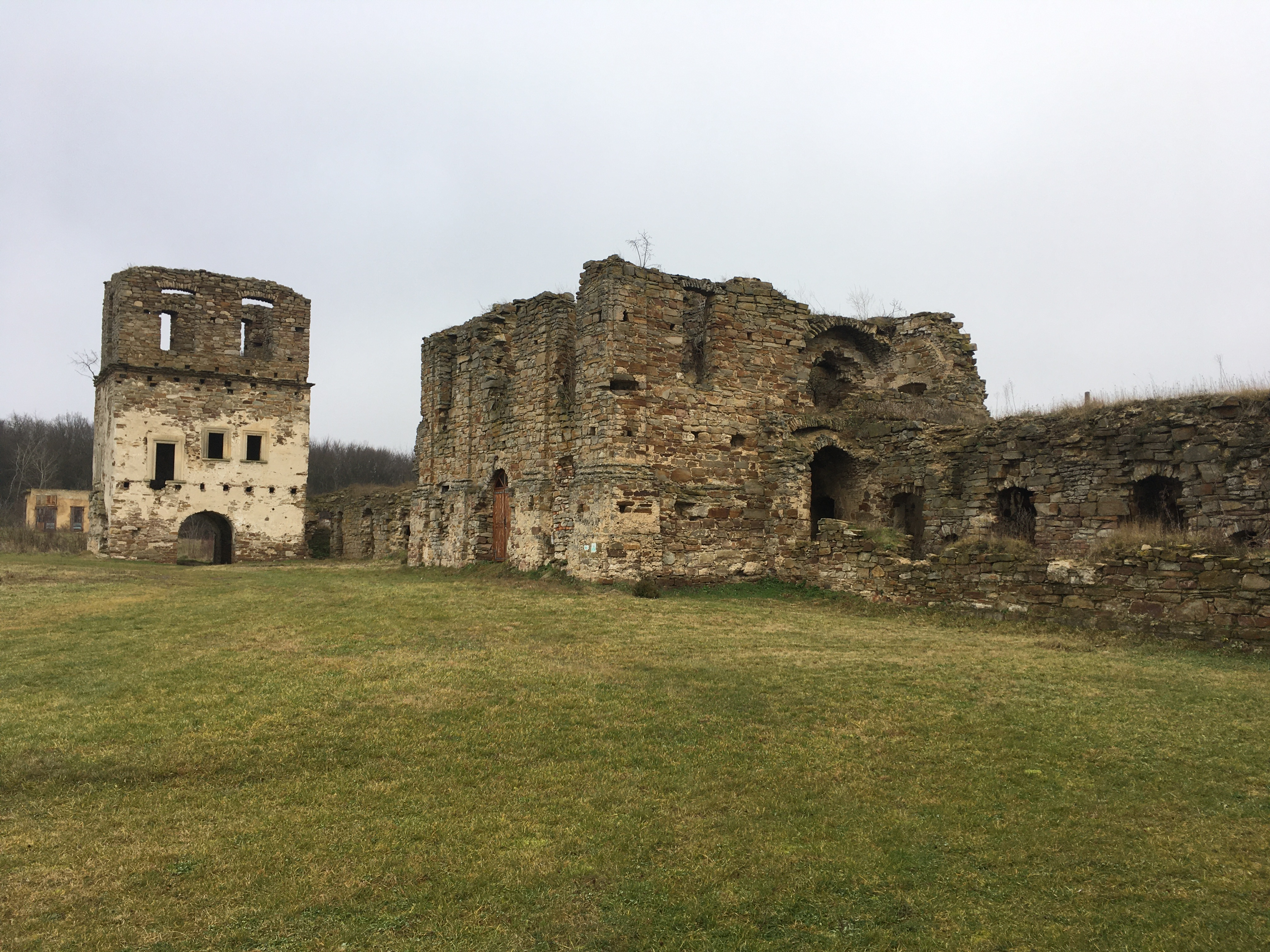
Pidhora Monastery, ruins

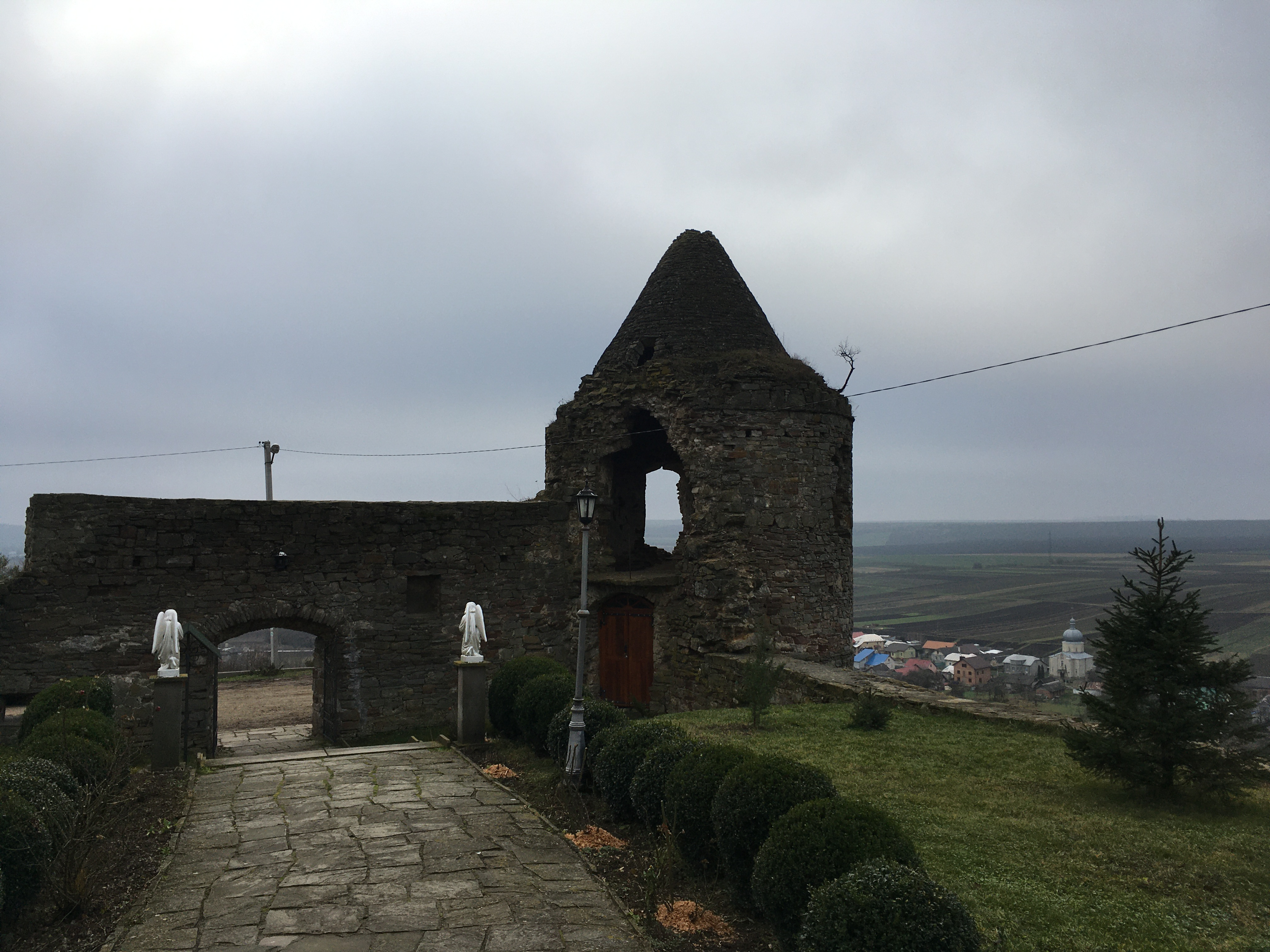
Pidhora Monastery, tower

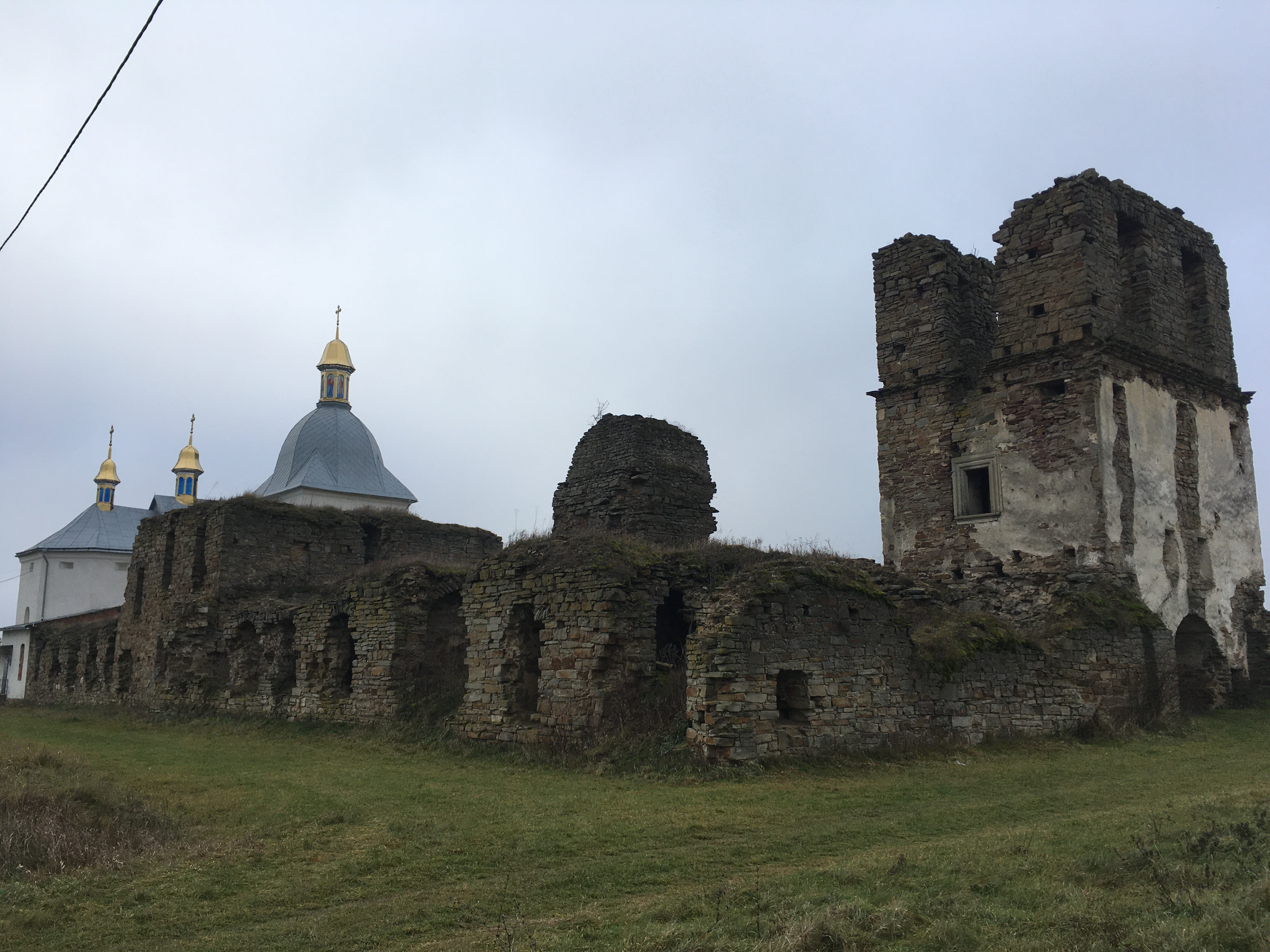
Pidhora Monastery, ruins

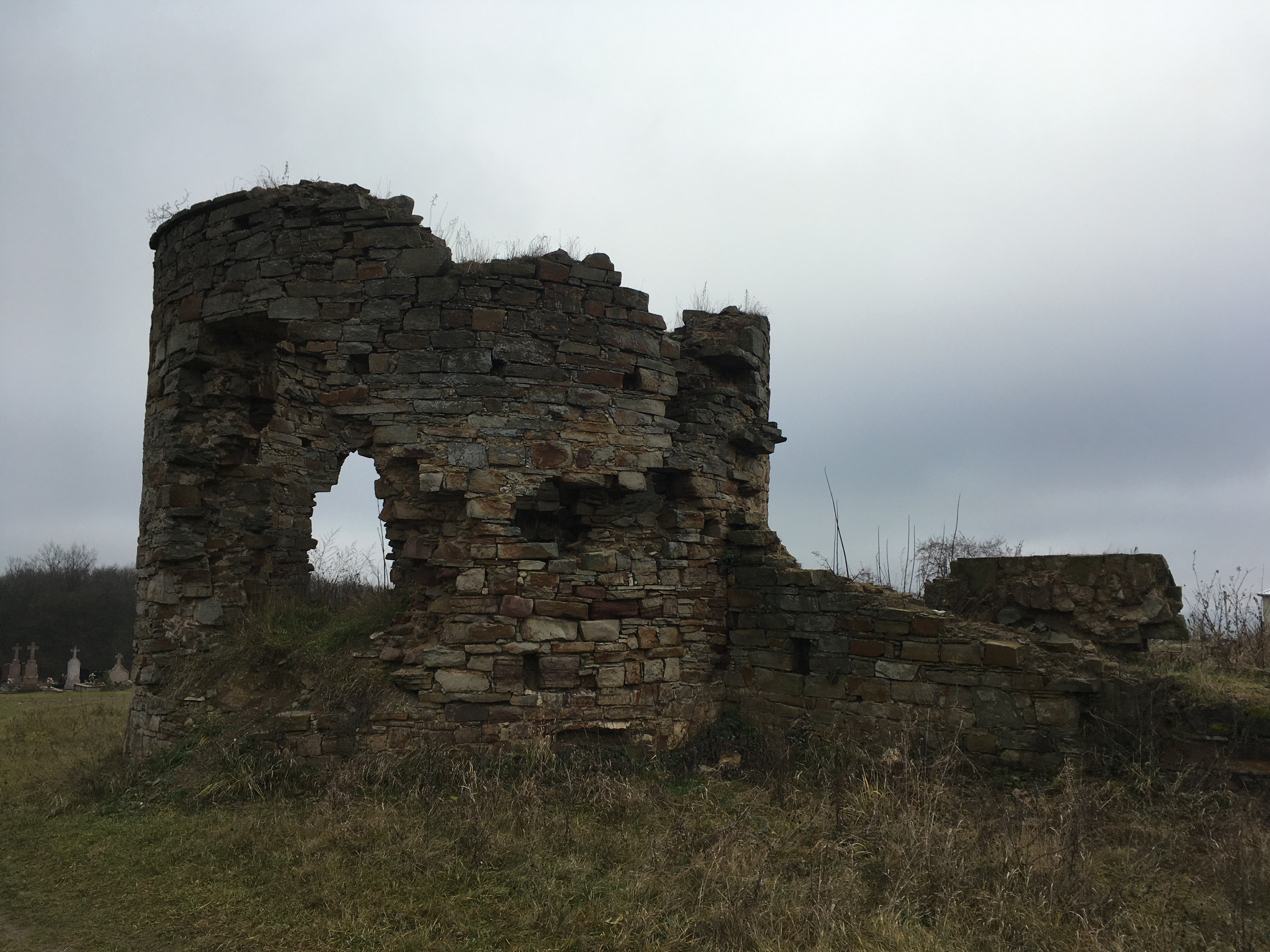
Pidhora Monastery, ruins

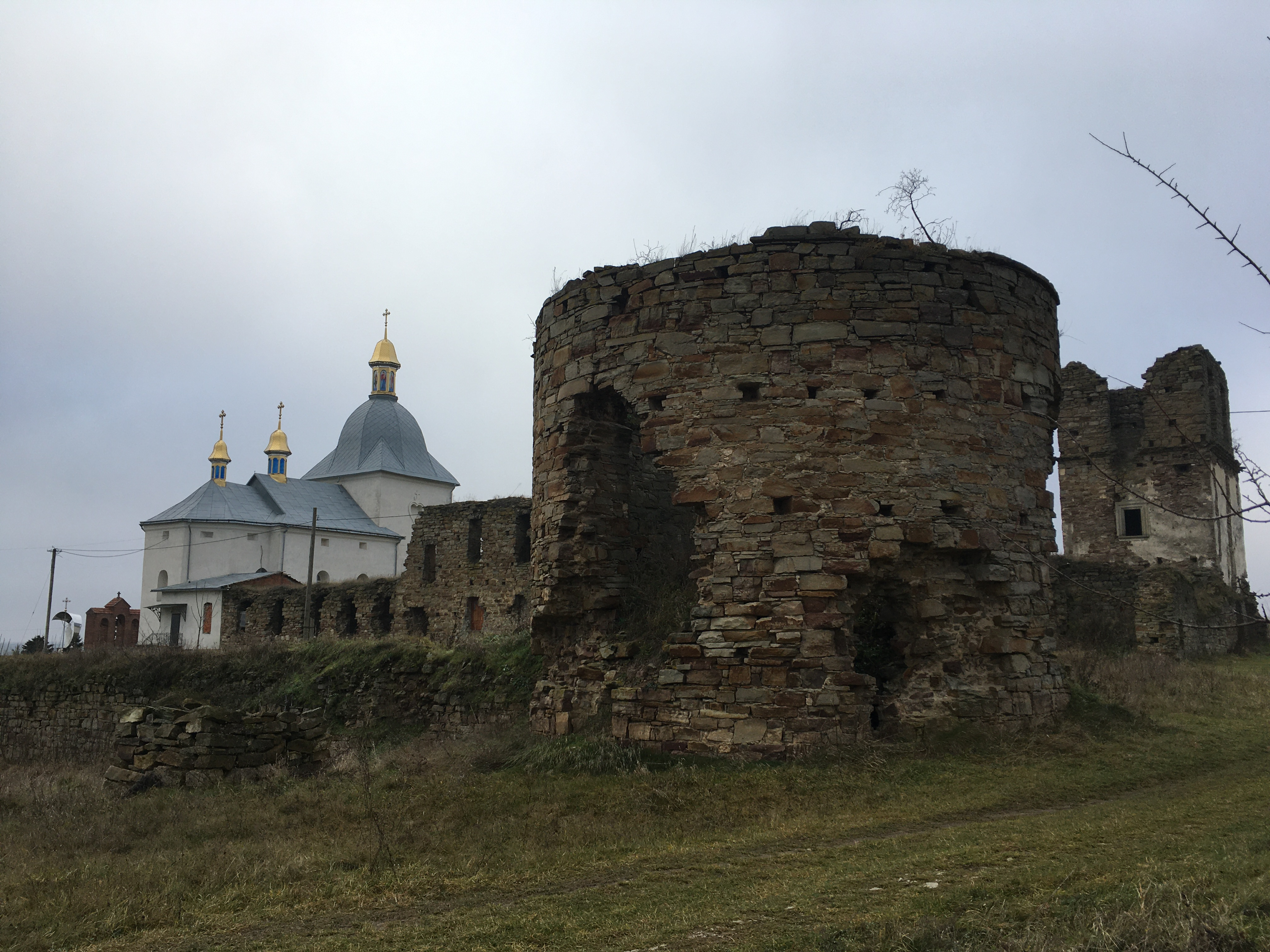
Pidhora Monastery, ruins

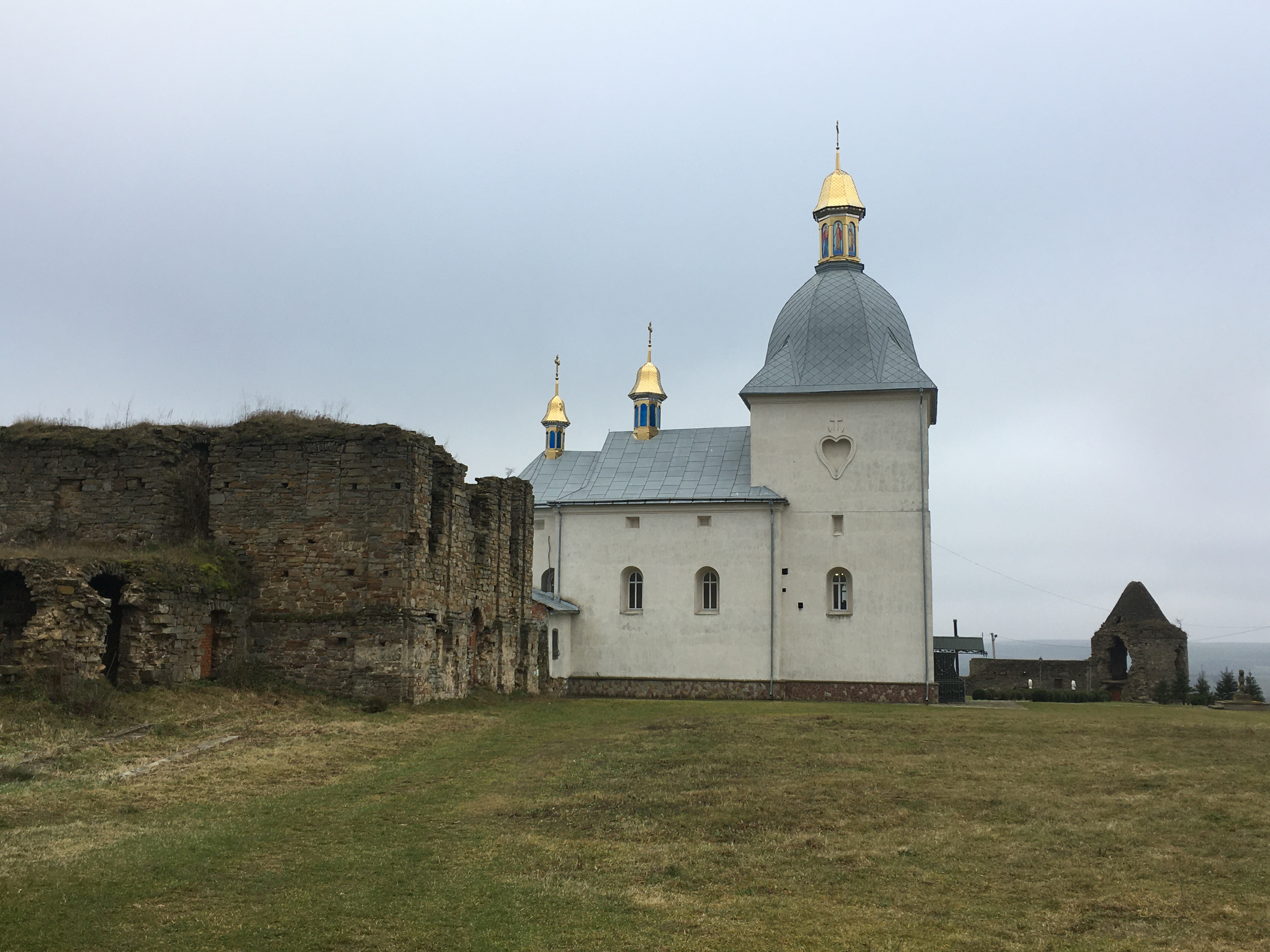
Pidhora Monastery, ruins

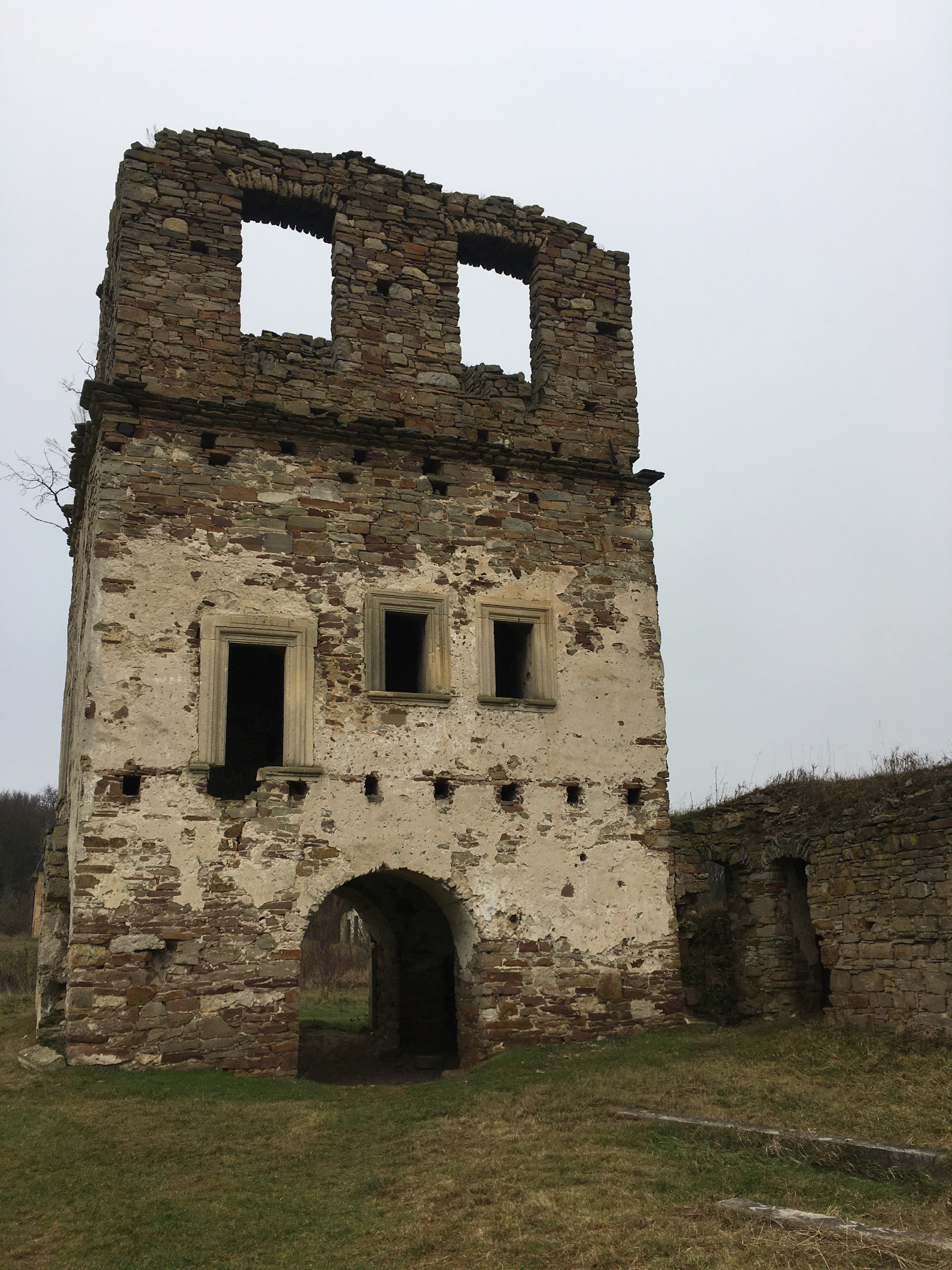
Pidhora Monastery, ruins
