= Pidhaichyky, Terebovlia urban hromada, Ternopil Raion, Ternopil Oblast =

Rural locality in Ternopil Oblast, Ukraine

Pidhaichyky Підгайчики
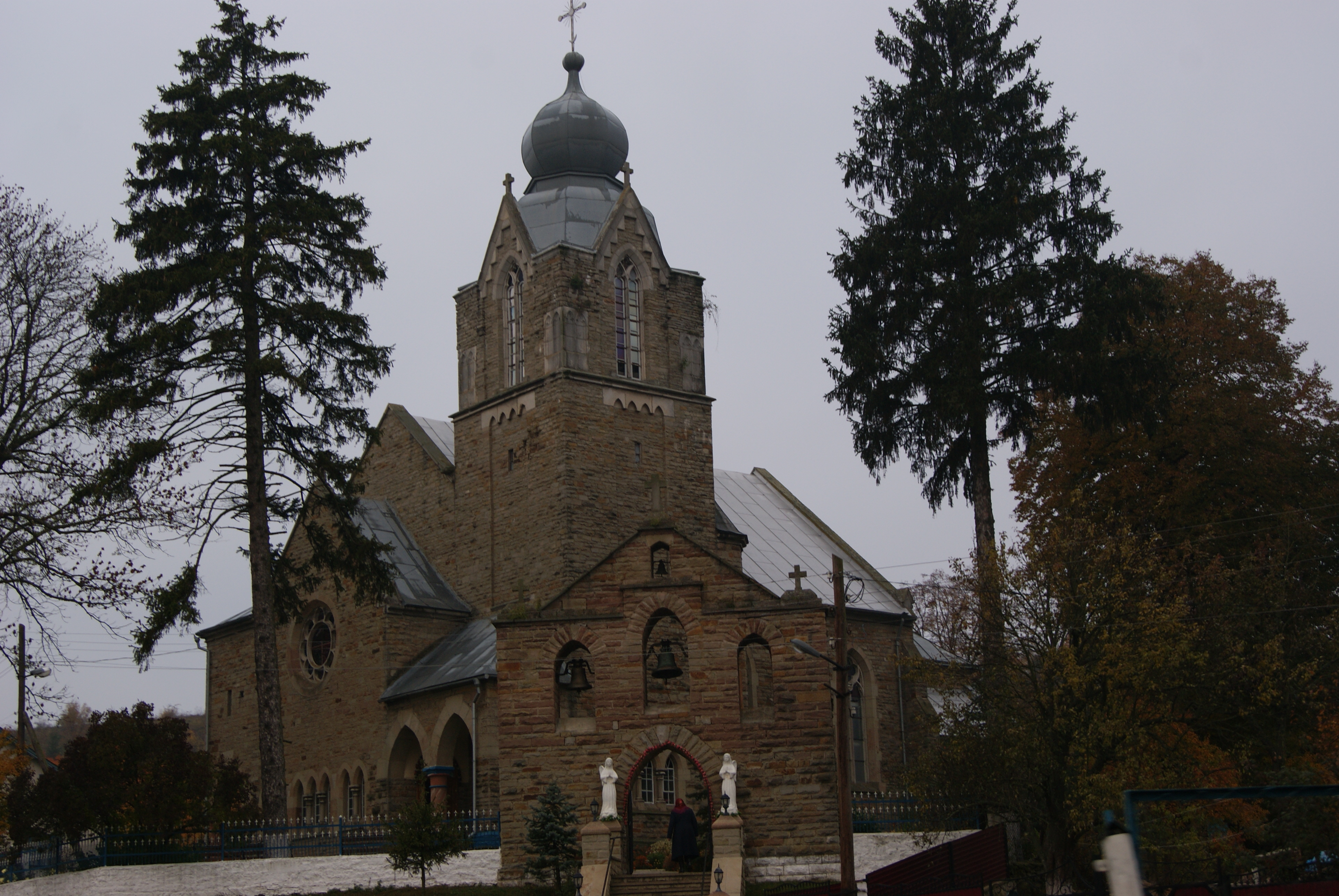
- Church in Pidhaichyky

- Location in Ternopil Oblast
- Coordinates: 49°14′42″N 25°41′21″E
- Country: Ukraine
- Oblast: Ternopil Oblast
- Raion: Ternopil Raion
- Hromada: Terebovlia urban hromada
- Time zone: UTC+2 (EET)
  - Summer (DST): UTC+3 (EEST)
- Postal code: 48150

Pidhaichyky (Ukrainian: Підгайчики) is a village in Terebovlia urban hromada, Ternopil Raion, Ternopil Oblast, Ukraine.

== History ==
The first written mention of the village was in 1469.

After the liquidation of the Terebovlia Raion on 19 July 2020, the village became part of the Ternopil Raion.

== Religion ==
- Church of the Assumption (1911, built of stone, restored and rebuilt from a Roman Catholic church in 1990).

== Monuments ==
- Kozibródski Palace (1887).

== Sources ==
- (in Ukrainian) Пиндус Б., Підгайчики // Ternopil Encyclopedic Dictionary: in 4 v. / editorial board: H. Yavorskyi and other, Ternopil: "Zbruch", 2008, V. 3: П—Я, S. 80. — ISBN 978-966-528-279-2.
- "Podhajczyki 3.) P. z Wybranówką, wś, pow. trembowelski". Geographical Dictionary of the Kingdom of Poland (in Polish). 8. Warszawa: Kasa im. Józefa Mianowskiego. 1887. p. 389.
