= Mykulyntsi settlement hromada =

Hromada in Ternopil Oblast, Ukraine

Mykulyntsi settlement hromada Микулинецька селищна громада
- hromada
- Seal

- Location within Ternopil Oblast Location within Ukraine
- Coordinates: 49°23′17″N 25°37′04″E
- Country: Ukraine
- Oblast: Ternopil Oblast
- Raion: Ternopil Raion
- Administrative center: Mykulyntsi

Government
  - Hromada head: Ivan Slobodian

Area
  - Total: 95.1 km^{2} (36.7 sq mi)

Population (2022)
  - Total: 16,974
- Urban-type settlement: 2
- Villages: 18
- Website: mykulynecka-gromada.gov.ua

Mykulyntsi settlement hromada (Ukrainian: Микулинецька селищна територіальна громада, romanized: Mykulynetska selyshchna terytorialna hromada is a hromada in Ukraine, in Ternopil Raion of Ternopil Oblast. The administrative center is the urban-type settlement of Mykulyntsi. Its population is 16,974 (2022 estimate) Founded on 12 August 2015.

== Settlements ==
The community consists of 2 urban-type settlement (Druzhba and Mykulyntsi) and 18 villages:

- Bernadivka
- Varvaryntsi
- Volia
- Darakhiv
- Dvorichchia
- Zazdrist
- Zubiv
- Kamianka
- Konopkivka
- Kryvky
- Ladychyn
- Naluzhzhia
- Nova Brykulia
- Rizdviany
- Stara Brykulia
- Strusiv
- Tiutkiv
- Khmelivka
