= Ivanivka rural hromada, Ternopil Oblast =

Rural hromada in Ternopil Oblast, Ukraine

Ivanivka rural hromada Іванівська сільська громада
- hromada
- Location within Ternopil Oblast Location within Ukraine
- Coordinates: 49°16′28″N 25°49′8″E
- Country: Ukraine
- Oblast: Ternopil Oblast
- Raion: Ternopil Raion
- Administrative center: Ivanivka

Government
  - Hromada head: Ruslan Shafranovych

Area
  - Total: 109.8 km^{2} (42.4 sq mi)

Population (2022)
  - Total: 4,024
- Villages: 5
- Website: ivanivska-gromada.gov.ua

Ivanivka rural territorial hromada (Ukrainian: Іванівська територіальна громада, romanized: Ivanivska silska terytorialna hromada) is a hromada in Ukraine, in Ternopil Raion of Ternopil Oblast. The administrative center is the village of Ivanivka. Its population is 4,024 (2022 estimate) Established on 17 July 2015.

== Settlements ==
The hromada consists of 5 villages:

- Hleshchava
- Ivanivka
- Ilavche
- Lozivka
- Sorotske
