= Terebovlia urban hromada =

Urban hromada in Ternopil Oblast, Ukraine

Terebovlia urban hromada Теребовлянська міська громада
- hromada
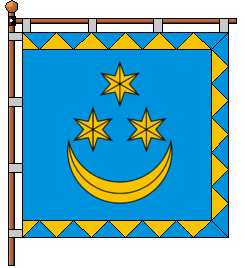
- Flag

- Location within Ternopil Oblast Location within Ukraine
- Coordinates: 49°18′2″N 25°41′58″E
- Country: Ukraine
- Oblast: Ternopil Oblast
- Raion: Ternopil Raion
- Administrative center: Terebovlia

Government
  - Hromada head: Serhii Poperechnyi

Area
  - Total: 444.8 km^{2} (171.7 sq mi)

Population (2022)
  - Total: 30,293
- City: 1
- Villages: 27
- Website: terebotg.in.ua

Terebovlia urban territorial hromada (Ukrainian: Теребовлянська територіальна громада, romanized: Terebovlianska miska terytorialna hromada) is a hromada in Ukraine, in Ternopil Raion of Ternopil Oblast. The administrative center is the city of Terebovlia. Its population is 30,293 (2022 estimate) Founded on 29 July 2015.

== Settlements ==
The hromada consists of 1 city (Terebovlia) and 27 villages:

- Borychivka
- Verbivtsi
- Humnyska
- Derenivka
- Dovhe
- Dolyna
- Zalavie
- Zastinoche
- Zelenche
- Kobylovoloky
- Krovynka
- Laskivtsi
- Loshniv
- Maliv
- Mlynyska
- Mshanets
- Nova Mohylnytsia
- Ostaltsi
- Ostrivets
- Pidhaichyky
- Pidhora
- Plebanivka
- Romanivka
- Semeniv
- Slobidka
- Stara Mohylnytsia
- Sushchyn
