= Terebovlia Raion =

Former subdivision of Ternopil Oblast, Ukraine

Terebovlia Raion Теребовлянський район
- Raion
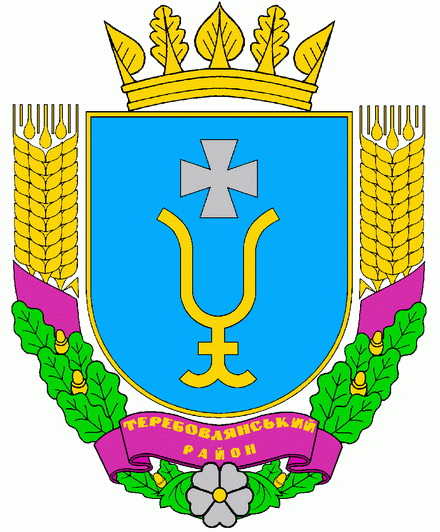
- Flag Coat of arms

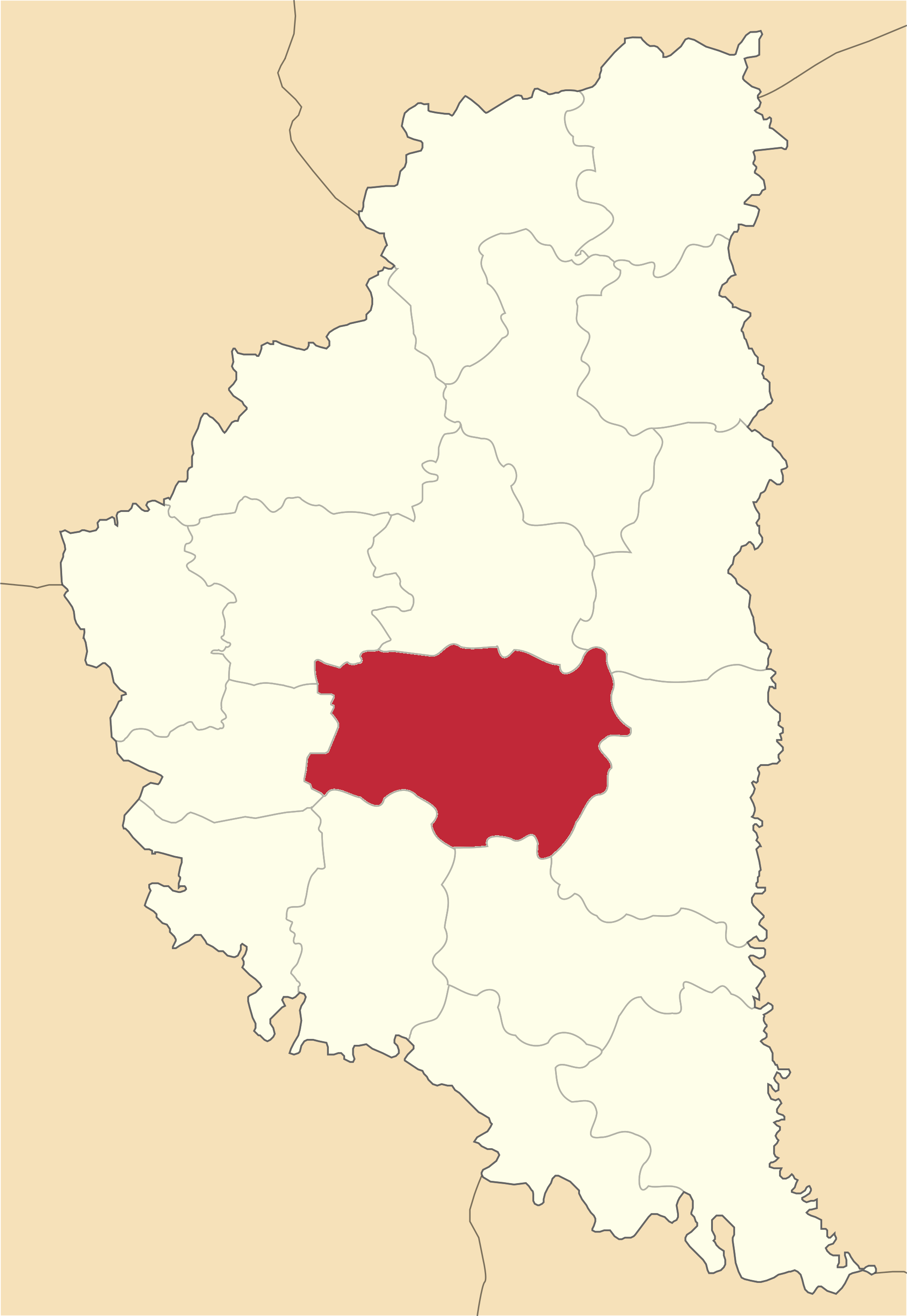
- Coordinates: 49°16′N 25°35′E
- Country: Ukraine
- Oblast: Ternopil Oblast
- Established: 1940
- Disestablished: 18 July 2020
- Admin. center: Terebovlia
- Subdivisions: List: — city councils; — settlement councils; — rural councils; Number of localities: — cities; — urban-type settlements; 75 — villages; — rural settlements

Area
  - Total: 113.000 km^{2} (43.630 sq mi)

Population (2020)
  - Total: 62,962
  - Density: 557.19/km^{2} (1,443.1/sq mi)
- Time zone: UTC+02:00 (EET)
  - Summer (DST): UTC+03:00 (EEST)
- Area code: +380

Terebovlia Raion (Ukrainian: Теребовлянський район) was a raion (district) in Ternopil Oblast in western Ukraine. Its administrative center was the city of Terebovlia. The raion was abolished on 18 July 2020 as part of the administrative reform of Ukraine, which reduced the number of raions of Ternopil Oblast to three. The area of Terebovlia Raion was merged into Ternopil Raion. The last estimate of the raion population was 62,962 (2020 est.).

At the time of disestablishment, the raion consisted of four hromadas:

- Ivanivka rural hromada with the administration in the selo of Ivanivka;
- Mykulyntsi settlement hromada with the administration in the urban-type settlement of Mykulyntsi;
- Terebovlia urban hromada with the administration in Terebovlia;
- Zolotnyky rural hromada with the administration in the selo of Zolotnyky.

== See also ==
- Subdivisions of Ukraine
