= List of villages in Ternopil Oblast =

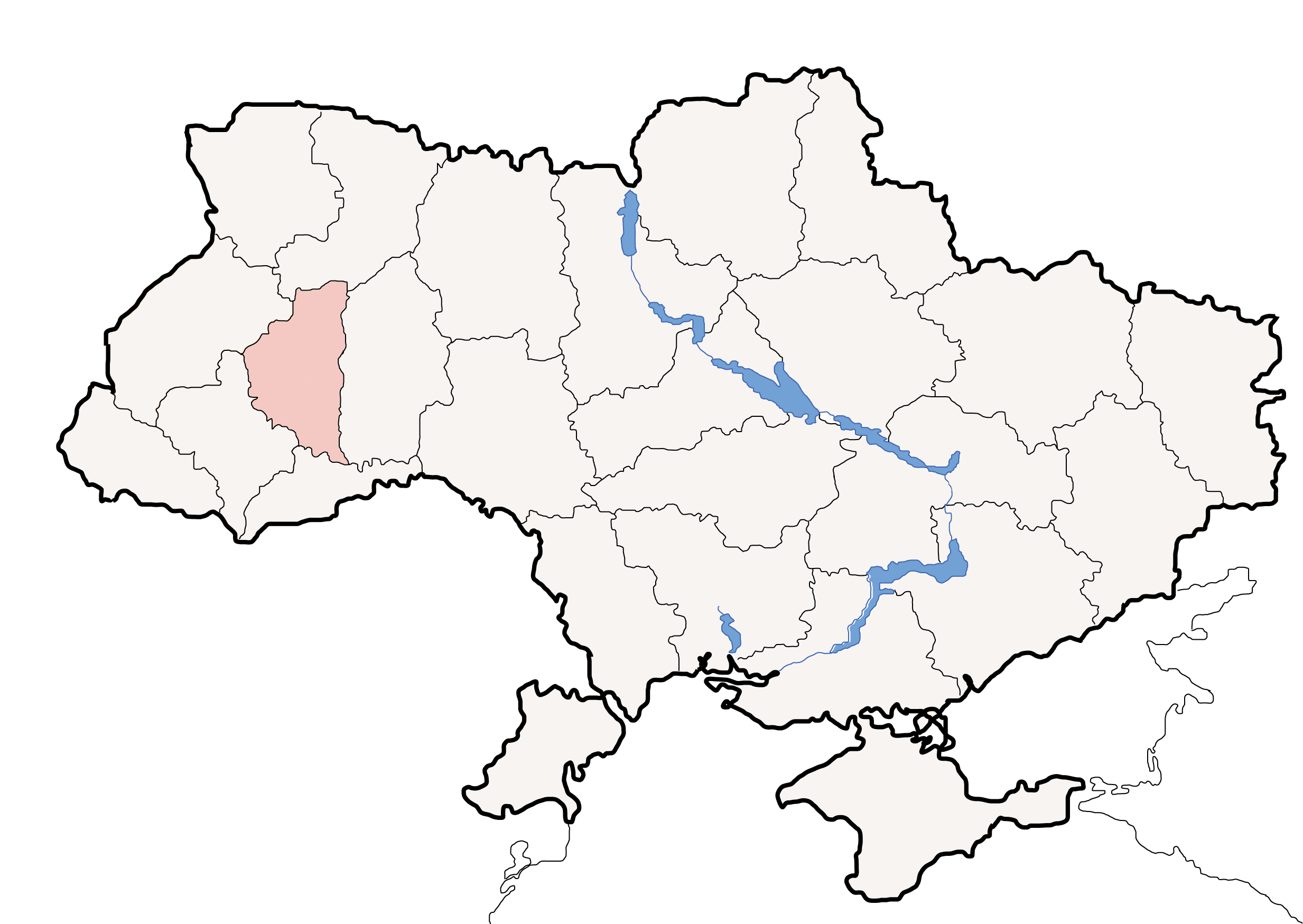
Map of the Ternopil Oblast.

The following is a list of villages in Ternopil Oblast in Ukraine.

== Berezhany Raion ==
- Baranivka
- Baznykivka
- Bishche
- Bozhykiv
- Chervone
- Demnia
- Dibrova
- Duliaby
- Dvirtsi
- Haiok
- Hutysko
- Hynovychi
- Кomarivka
- Кotiv
- Krasnopushcha
- Kuryany
- Кuropatnyky
- Кuty
- Кvitkove
- Lapshyn
- Litiatyn
- Mechyshchiv
- Molokhiv
- Nadorozhniv
- Nadrichne
- Naraiv
- Nova Hreblia
- Pavliv
- Pidlisne
- Pidvysoke
- Plikhiv
- Poruchyn
- Posukhiv
- Potochany
- Potutory
- Pysarivka
- Rekshyn
- Rohachyn
- Rybnyky
- Saranchuky
- Shaibivka
- Shybalyn
- Sloviatyn
- Stryhantsi
- Trostianets
- Urman
- Verbiv
- Vilkhovets
- Voloshchyna
- Volytsia
- Yasne
- Zaluzhzhia
- Zhovnivka
- Zhukiv

== Borshchiv Raion ==
- Babyntsi
- Berezhanka
- Bilche-Zolote
- Bilivtsi
- Boryshkivtsi
- Burdiakivtsi
- Dnistrove
- Dubivka
- Dzvenyhorod
- Dzvyniachka
- Hermakivka
- Hlybochok
- Horoshova
- Hrabivtsi
- Hushtyn
- Hushtynka
- Ivane-Puste
- Ivankiv
- Khudiyivtsi
- Khudykivtsi
- Konstantsiia
- Korolivka
- Kozachchyna
- Kryvche
- Kudryntsi
- Lanivtsi
- Latkivtsi
- Losiach
- Monastyrok
- Mushkariv
- Mushkativka
- Mykhailivka
- Mykhalkiv
- Nyvra
- Okopy
- Oleksyntsi
- Ozeriany
- Panivtsi
- Pidpylypia
- Pylatkivtsi
- Pylypche
- Pyshchatyntsi
- Sapohiv
- Shershenivka
- Shuparka
- Shyshkivtsi
- Skoviatyn
- Slobidka-Mushkativska
- Strilkivtsi
- Triytsia
- Trubchyn
- Tsyhany
- Tulyn
- Turylche
- Urozhaine
- Ustia
- Verbivka
- Verkhniakivtsi
- Vilkhovets
- Vovkivtsi
- Vyhoda
- Vysichka
- Yuriampil
- Zalissia
- Zaluchchia
- Zavallia
- Zbruchanske
- Zbryzh
- Zelene
- Zhylyntsi

== Buchach Raion ==
- Barysh
- Beremiany
- Biliavyntsi
- Bobulyntsi
- Brovari
- Dobropole
- Duliby
- Hubyn
- Kosmyryn
- Kostilnyky
- Kurdybanivka
- Kydaniv
- Lishchantsi
- Martynivka
- Mateushivka
- Medvedivtsi, Ternopil OblastMedvedivtsi
- Mlynky
- Mykolayivka
- Naberezhne
- Novi Petlykivtsi
- Novosilka
- Novostavtsi
- Osivtsi
- Ozeriany
- Peredmistia
- Perevoloka
- Pidlissia
- Pidzamochok
- Pomirtsi
- Porokhova
- Pozhezha
- Pushkari
- Pyliava
- Pyshkivtsi
- Ripyntsi
- Rublyn
- Rukomysh
- Rusyliv
- Skomorokhy
- Snovydiv
- Sokilets
- Sokoliv
- Soroky
- Stari Petlykivtsi
- Stinka
- Trybukhivtsi
- Tsvitova
- Verbiatyn
- Vozyliv
- Yazlovets
- Zalishchyky
- Zaryvyntsi
- Zelena
- Zhnyborody
- Zhyznomyr
- Zubrets
- Zvenyhorod

== Chortkiv Raion ==
- Antoniv
- Bazar
- Bila
- Bilobozhnytsia
- Bilyi Potik
- Bosyry
- Bychkivtsi
- Cherkavshchyna
- Chornokinetska Volia
- Davydkivtsi
- Dolyna
- Dzhuryn
- Dzhurynska Slobidka
- Horishnia Vyhnanka
- Kalynivshchyna
- Kapustyntsi
- Kolyndiany
- Kosiv
- Kotsiubynchyky
- Kryvenke
- Kryvoluka
- Mali Chornokintsi
- Mazurivka
- Mukhavka
- Mylivtsi
- Palashivka
- Pastushe
- Perekhody
- Polivtsi
- Probizhna
- Romashivka
- Rosokhach
- Rydoduby
- Semakivtsi
- Shmankivchyky
- Shmankivtsi
- Shulhanivka
- Shvaikivtsi
- Skomoroshe
- Skorodyntsi
- Sokyryntsi
- Sosulivka
- Stara Yahilnytsia
- Svydova
- Tarnavka
- Tovstenke
- Uhryn
- Ulashkivtsi
- Vasylkiv
- Velyki Chornokintsi
- Yahilnytsia
- Zabolotivka
- Zalissia
- Zelena
- Zvyniach

== Husiatyn Raion ==
- Bilynivka
- Bodnarivka
- Butsyky
- Chabarivka
- Chahari
- Hadynkivtsi
- Hlibiv
- Horodnytsia
- Kalaharivka
- Karashyntsi
- Khlopivka
- Kliuvyntsi
- Kokoshyntsi
- Kotivka
- Kotsiubyntsi
- Kozyna
- Krasne
- Krohulets
- Krutyliv
- Kut
- Lezhanivka
- Lychkivtsi
- Maidan
- Mala Luka
- Mali Birky
- Monastyrykha
- Novosilka
- Nyzhbirok
- Olenivka
- Oryshkivtsi
- Payivka
- Peremyliv
- Piznanka
- Postolivka
- Rashtivtsi
- Rudky
- Sadzhivka
- Samoluskivtsi
- Shydlivtsi
- Soroka
- Staryi Nyzhbirok
- Stavky
- Sukhodil
- Sukhostav
- Sydoriv
- Teklivka
- Tovste
- Trybukhivtsi
- Tseliyiv
- Tudoriv
- Uvysla
- Vasylkivtsi
- Verkhivtsi
- Vikno
- Vilkhivchyk
- Volytsia
- Vyhoda
- Yabluniv
- Yemelivka
- Zelene
- Zhabyntsi

== Kozova Raion ==
- Avhustivka
- Bartoshivka
- Budova
- Budyliv
- Byshky
- Denysiv
- Dmukhivtsi
- Drahomanivka
- Dvoryshche
- Dybshche
- Helenky
- Hlynna
- Horby
- Horodyshche
- Ishkiv
- Kalne
- Khorobriv
- Khorostets
- Koniukhy
- Kozivka
- Kryve
- Kupchyntsi
- Makovysko
- Mala Plavucha
- Medova
- Mlyntsi
- Olesyne
- Ploske
- Plotycha
- Pokropyvna
- Potik
- Rosokhuvatets
- Senkiv
- Shchepaniv
- Slobidka
- Tauriv
- Teofipilka
- Tseniv
- Tsytsory
- Urytva
- Velyka Plavucha
- Velykyi Khodachkiv
- Vesnivka
- Viktorivka
- Vivsia
- Vybudiv
- Vymyslivka
- Yastrubove
- Yosypivka
- Zaberizky
- Zalissia
- Zolochivka
- Zolota Sloboda

== Kremenets Raion ==
- Andruha
- Bakoty
- Bashuky
- Bilokrynytsia
- Bohdanivka
- Bonivka
- Borshchivka
- Budky
- Chuhali
- Dibrova
- Dukhiv
- Dunayiv
- Dvirets
- Hayi
- Horynka
- Hrada
- Ikva
- Ivankivtsi
- Ivannia
- Katerynivka
- Khotivka
- Khotovytsia
- Kimnata
- Kolosova
- Komarivka
- Komaryn
- Krutniv
- Kryzhi
- Kulykiv
- Kushlyn
- Lidykhiv
- Lishnia
- Lopushne
- Losiatyn
- Mala Horianka
- Mali Berezhtsi
- Mlynivtsi
- Novyi Kokoriv
- Novyi Oleksynets
- Ocheretne
- Pidlisne
- Pidlistsi
- Ploske
- Popivtsi
- Raslavka
- Roztoky
- Rudka
- Rybcha
- Rydomyl
- Sapaniv
- Savchytsi
- Shpykolosy
- Staryi Kokoriv
- Staryi Oleksynets
- Staryi Pochayiv
- Staryi Tarazh
- Ustechko
- Valihury
- Velyka Horianka
- Velyki Berezhtsi
- Velyki Mlynivtsi
- Vesela
- Veselivka
- Volytsia
- Zatyshshia
- Zeblozy
- Zholoby

== Lanivtsi Raion ==
- Berezhanka
- Bilozirka
- Borshchivka
- Borsuky
- Buhliv
- Chaichyntsi
- Hrybova
- Hrynky
- Ivankivtsi
- Karnachivka
- Korostova
- Korzhkivtsi
- Kozachky
- Krasnoluka
- Kutyska
- Liulyntsi
- Lopushne
- Mala Bilka
- Mala Karnachivka
- Mala Snihurivka
- Mali Kuskivtsi
- Maneve
- Martyshkivtsi
- Molotkiv
- Moskalivka
- Mykhailivka
- Napadivka
- Ohryzkivtsi
- Oryshkivtsi
- Osnyky
- Pakhynia
- Pechirna
- Peredmirka
- Plyska
- Shushkivtsi
- Shyly
- Snihurivka
- Sokolivka
- Synivtsi
- Tataryntsi
- Vanzhuliv
- Velyka Bilka
- Velyki Kuskivtsi
- Verbovets
- Vereshchaky
- Vlashchyntsi
- Volytsia
- Vyshhorodok
- Yakymivtsi
- Yuskivtsi
- Zahirtsi
- Zhukivtsi

== Monastyryska Raion ==
- Bertnyky
- Bobrivnyky
- Chekhiv
- Dibrova
- Dobromyshl
- Dobrovody
- Dubenka
- Honcharivka
- Horishnia Slobidka
- Horozhanka
- Horyhliady
- Hranitne
- Hryhoriv
- Komarivka
- Korzhova
- Kovalivka
- Krasiyiv
- Krynytsia
- Lazarivka
- Liadske
- Luka
- Markova
- Mezhyhiria
- Nova Huta
- Nyzkolyzy
- Olesha
- Pidlisne
- Ridkolissia
- Sadove
- Sadzhivka
- Savelivka
- Senkiv
- Shveikiv
- Styhla
- Svitle
- Trostiantsi
- Ustia-Zelene
- Velesniv
- Verbka
- Vistria
- Vysoke
- Yarhoriv
- Zadariv
- Zalissia
- Zastavtsi
- Zatyshne
- Zavadivka

== Pidhaitsi Raion ==
- Bilokrynytsia
- Bokiv
- Bronhalivka
- Сherven
- Halych
- Hnylche
- Holendra
- Holhocha
- Lysa
- Lytvyniv
- Mozolivka
- Muzhyliv
- Mykhailivka
- Myrne
- Nosiv
- Novosilka
- Panovychi
- Poplavy
- Rudnyky
- Serednye
- Shumliany
- Siltse
- Soniachne
- Stare Misto
- Staryi Lytvyniv
- Stepove
- Uhryniv
- Vaha
- Verbiv
- Volytsia
- Yablunivka
- Yustynivka
- Zahaitsi
- Zastavche
- Zaturyn
- Zavaliv

== Pidvolochysk Raion ==
- Bohdanivka
- Chernylivka
- Dorofiyivka
- Fashchivka
- Halushchyntsi
- Hnylychky
- Hnylytsi
- Holoshyntsi
- Holotky
- Horodnytsia
- Hushchanky
- Ivanivka
- Kachanivka
- Kamianky
- Khmelyska
- Khoptianka
- Klebanivka
- Klymkivtsi
- Kolodiyivka
- Korshylivka
- Koshliaky
- Koziari
- Kryve
- Lozivka
- Lysychyntsi
- Mahdalivka
- Medyn
- Movchanivka
- Myslova
- Mytnytsia
- Nove Selo
- Novosilka
- Obodivka
- Orikhovets
- Ostapye
- Palchyntsi
- Panasivka
- Penkivtsi
- Podillia
- Polupanivka
- Poplavy
- Prosivtsi
- Rosokhuvatets
- Rozhysk
- Shchasnivka
- Shelpaky
- Shevchenkove
- Skoryky
- Staromishchyna
- Staryi Skalat
- Sukhivtsi
- Supranivka
- Tarnoruda
- Teklivka
- Terpylivka
- Toky
- Turivka
- Vorobiyivka
- Zarubyntsi
- Zherebky

== Shumsk Raion ==
- Andrushivka
- Antonivtsi
- Bashkivtsi
- Birky
- Bolozhivka
- Brykiv
- Bykivtsi
- Hrynkivtsi
- Khodaky
- Konovytsia
- Kordyshiv
- Kruholets
- Kudlayivka
- Kutianka
- Kuty
- Litovyshche
- Liudvyshche
- Mala Ilovytsia
- Mali Dederkaly
- Mali Sadky
- Mali Zahaitsi
- Matviyivtsi
- Miziuryntsi
- Myrove
- Novosilka
- Novostav
- Obych
- Oderadivka
- Onyshkivtsi
- Peremorivka
- Pidhaitsi
- Pishchatyntsi
- Potutoriv
- Radoshivka
- Rokhmaniv
- Ruska Huta
- Sadky
- Shkrobotivka
- Shumbar
- Soshyshche
- Sosnivka
- Stizhok
- Surazh
- Temnohaitsi
- Tetylkivtsi
- Tsetsenivka
- Tury
- Tyliavka
- Uhorsk
- Vaskivtsi
- Velyka Ilovytsia
- Velyki Dederkaly
- Velyki Zahaitsi
- Verbytsia
- Viliia
- Vovkivtsi
- Zabara
- Zalistsi
- Zaluzhzhia
- Zholobky

== Terebovlia Raion ==
- Bahatkivtsi
- Beneva
- Bernadivka
- Borychivka
- Budaniv
- Burkaniv
- Darakhiv
- Derenivka
- Dolyna
- Dovhe
- Dvorichchia
- Haivoronka
- Hleshchava
- Honcharky
- Humnyska
- Hvardiyske
- Ilavche
- Ivanivka
- Kamianka
- Khmelivka
- Kobylovoloky
- Konopkivka
- Kotuziv
- Krovynka
- Kryvky
- Ladychyn
- Laskivtsi
- Loshniv
- Lozivka
- Maliv
- Malovody
- Malyi Hovyliv
- Mlynyska
- Mshanets
- Nadrichne
- Naluzhzhia
- Nova Brykulia
- Nova Mohylnytsia
- Ostaltsi
- Ostrivets
- Pantalykha
- Papirnia
- Pidhaichyky
- Pidhora
- Pidruda
- Plebanivka
- Rakovets
- Rizdviany
- Romanivka
- Sapova
- Semeniv
- Semykivtsi Slobidka
- Sokilnyky
- Sokoliv
- Sorotske
- Sosniv
- Stara Brykulia
- Stara Mohylnytsia
- Strusiv
- Sushchyn
- Tiutkiv
- Varvaryntsi
- Velykyi Hovyliv
- Verbivtsi
- Volia
- Vyshenky
- Vyshnivchyk
- Zalavye
- Zarvanytsia
- Zastinoche
- Zazdrist
- Zelenche
- Zolotnyky
- Zubiv

== Ternopil Raion ==
- Anhelivka Bavoriv
- Baikivtsi
- Bila
- Biloskirka
- Butsniv
- Cherneliv-Ruskyi
- Chystyliv
- Domamorych
- Dovzhanka
- Drahanivka
- Dubivtsi
- Dychkiv
- Hayi-Hrechynski
- Hayi-Shevchenkivski
- Hrabovets
- Ihrovytsia
- Ivachiv Dolishniy
- Ivachiv Horishniy
- Khatky
- Kostiantynivka
- Kozivka
- Krasivka
- Kurnyky
- Kypiachka
- Lozova
- Luchka
- Malyi Khodachkiv
- Marianivka
- Myroliubivka
- Myshkovychi
- Nastasiv
- Ostriv
- Petrykiv
- Pidhorodne
- Plotycha
- Pochapyntsi
- Proshova
- Romanivka
- Seredynky
- Shliakhtyntsi
- Skomorokhy
- Smolianka
- Smykivtsi
- Soborne
- Stehnykivtsi
- Stupky
- Teofilivka
- Tovstoluh
- Velyka Luka
- Velyki Hayi
- Velykyi Hlybochok
- Yosypivka
- Zaboiky
- Zastavye
- Zastinka

== Zalishchyky Raion ==
- Anhelivka
- Bedrykivtsi
- Berestok
- Blyshchanka
- Buriakivka
- Dobrivliany
- Dorohychivka
- Duniv
- Duplyska
- Dzvyniach
- Hlushka
- Holihrady
- Holovchyntsi
- Horodok
- Hynkivtsi
- Ivane-Zolote
- Kasperivtsi
- Khartonivtsi
- Khmeleva
- Kolodribka
- Korolivka
- Koshylivtsi
- Kulakivtsi
- Lysivtsi
- Lysychnyky
- Lytiachi
- Myshkiv
- Nahoriany
- Novosilka
- Nyrkiv
- Pechorna
- Podillia
- Popivtsi
- Rozhanivka
- Sadky
- Shchytivtsi
- Shutromyntsi
- Shypivtsi
- Slobidka
- Solone
- Stavky
- Svershkivtsi
- Synkiv
- Torske
- Uhrynkivtsi
- Ustechko
- Vorvulyntsi
- Vyhoda
- Vyniatyntsi
- Vynohradne
- Yakubivka
- Zelenyi Hai
- Zozulyntsi

== Zbarazh Raion ==
- Bazaryntsi
- Bodaky
- Boliazuby
- Butyn
- Chahari-Zbarazki
- Chernykhivtsi
- Chesnivskyi Rakovets
- Shornyi Lis
- Shumali
- Dibrova (Kokhanivka Rural council)
- Dibrova, Zbarazh urban hromada
- Dobromirka
- Dobrovody
- Dzvyniacha
- Fedkivtsi
- Hlynchuky
- Hnizdychne
- Hnydava
- Hory-Stryyovetski
- Hrytsivtsi
- Ivanchany
- Ivashkivtsi
- Kapustynskyi Lis
- Kapustyntsi
- Khomy
- Kobyllia
- Kokhanivka
- Kolodne
- Kotiuzhyny
- Krasnosiltsi
- Kretivtsi
- Kryvchyky
- Kydantsi
- Kynakhivtsi
- Lisky
- Lozy
- Maksymivka
- Mala Berezovytsia
- Mali Viknyny
- Malyi Hlybochok
- Malyi Kunynets
- Musorivtsi
- Myshkivtsi
- Novyi Rohovets
- Novyky
- Nyzhchi Lubianky
- Okhrymivtsi
- Olyshkivtsi
- Oprilivtsi
- Poliany
- Rakovets
- Reshnivka
- Romanove Selo
- Roznoshyntsi
- Shyly
- Shymkivtsi
- Staryi Vyshnivets
- Staryi Zbarazh
- Stryyivka
- Syniahivka
- Syniava
- Tarasivka
- Travneve
- Velyki Viknyny
- Velykyi Kunynets
- Verniaky
- Vyshchi Lubianky
- Vytkivtsi
- Zahoroddia
- Zalistsi
- Zaluzhzhia
- Zarubyntsi
- Zaruddia
- Zarudechko
- Zashliakhom

== Zboriv Raion ==
- Berymivtsi
- Bilkivtsi
- Biloholovy
- Bilokrynytsia
- Blikh
- Bohdanivka
- Bzovytsia
- Chernykhiv
- Chornyi Lis
- Chystopady
- Danylivtsi
- Ditkivtsi
- Futory
- Harbuziv
- Hayi-Roztotski
- Hayi-za-Rudoiu
- Hliadky
- Hodiv
- Horodyshche
- Hrabkivtsi
- Hukalivtsi
- Ivachiv
- Ivankivtsi
- Kabarivtsi
- Kalne
- Kalynivka
- Khomivka
- Khrabuzna
- Kobzarivka
- Kokutkivtsi
- Korchunok
- Korshyliv
- Krasna
- Kudobyntsi
- Kudynivtsi
- Kurivtsi
- Lavrykivtsi
- Lopushany
- Malashivtsi
- Manayiv
- Meteniv
- Mlynivtsi
- Monylivka
- Mshana
- Mshanets
- Mylne
- Nesterivtsi
- Neterpyntsi
- Nosivtsi
- Nyshche
- Oliyiv
- Ostashivtsi
- Ozerianka
- Ozerna
- Panasivka
- Perepelnyky
- Pidberiztsi
- Pidhaichyky
- Pishchane
- Pleskivtsi
- Plisniany
- Pohribtsi
- Prysivtsi
- Ratyshchi
- Reniv
- Rozhadiv
- Seredyntsi
- Seretets
- Slavna
- Syrovary
- Travotoloky
- Trostianets
- Tsebriv
- Tsetsivka
- Tustoholovy
- Vertelka
- Vilshanka
- Virliv
- Volosivka
- Vorobiyivka
- Vovchkivtsi
- Vysypivtsi
- Yarchivtsi
- Yaroslavychi
- Yatskivtsi
- Yosypivka
- Zahiria
- Zaruddia
- Zhabynia
- Zhukivtsi

== See also ==
- List of Canadian place names of Ukrainian origin
