= Viliia, Ternopil Oblast =

Rural locality in Ternopil Oblast, Ukraine

Viliia Вілія
- Interactive map of Viliia
- Location in Ternopil Oblast Viliia (Ternopil Oblast)
- Coordinates: 50°3′8″N 25°53′10″E
- Country: Ukraine
- Oblast: Ternopil Oblast
- Raion: Kremenets Raion
- Hromada: Shumsk urban hromada

Population (2003)
  - Total: 613
- Time zone: UTC+2 (EET)
  - Summer (DST): UTC+3 (EEST)
- Postal code: 47150

Viliia (Ukrainian: Вілія) is a village in Ukraine, Ternopil Oblast, Kremenets Raion, Shumsk urban hromada. After the abolition of the Shumsk Raion on 19 July 2020, the village became part of the Kremenets Raion.
