= Onyshkivtsi, Ternopil Oblast =

Rural locality in Ternopil Oblast, Ukraine

Onyshkivtsi Онишківці
- Interactive map of Onyshkivtsi
- Location in Ternopil Oblast Onyshkivtsi (Ternopil Oblast)
- Coordinates: 50°07′16″N 26°08′47″E
- Country: Ukraine
- Oblast: Ternopil Oblast
- Raion: Kremenets Raion
- Hromada: Shumsk urban hromada

Population (2016)
  - Total: 625
- Time zone: UTC+2 (EET)
  - Summer (DST): UTC+3 (EEST)
- Postal code: 47174

Onyshkivtsi (Ukrainian: Онишківці) is a village in Ukraine, Ternopil Oblast, Kremenets Raion, Shumsk urban hromada. After the liquidation of the Shumsk Raion on 19 July 2020, the village became part of the Kremenets Raion.

== Bibliography ==
- (in Ukrainian) Мельник В., Уніят В., Онишківці // Ternopil Encyclopedic Dictionary: in 4 v. / editorial board: H. Yavorskyi and other, Ternopil: "Zbruch", 2005, V. 2: К—О, S. 676. — ISBN 966-528-199-2.
- "Onyszkowce, pow. krzemieniecki". Geographical Dictionary of the Kingdom of Poland (in Polish). 7. Warszawa: Kasa im. Józefa Mianowskiego. 1886. p. 537.
