= Rostyslav Hluvko =

Ukrainian artist (1927–1990)

- Ростислав Олександрович Глувко
- Born: 8 May 1927; Surazh, Second Polish Republic (now Ternopil Oblast, Ukraine)
- Died: 4 March 1990 (aged 62); London
- Education: Hammersmith College of Art

Rostyslav Hluvko (Ukrainian: Ростислав Олександрович Глувко; 8 May 1927 – 4 March 1990) was Poland born Ukrainian artist, graphic artist, and public figure. A friend of Volodymyr Lutsiv.

== Biography ==
Rostyslav Hluvko was born on 8 May 1927 in Surazh, Second Polish Republic, (Note: Until 2007, it was believed that he was born in Kremenets) now the Shumsk urban hromada of the Kremenets Raion, Ternopil Oblast, Ukraine. He lived in Kremenets until 1940.

In 1940, he was deported to Kazakhstan with his mother. Later, in 1942, he traveled with Polish troops to Palestine via Iran. In 1947 he emigrated to the United Kingdom. In London, he graduated from Hammersmith College of Art (1951). Hluvko worked as a graphic artist.

Died on 4 March 1990 in London. According to his will, in 1991 he was buried in his father's grave at the Tunytske cemetery in Kremenets.

== Works ==
His artworks are in tempera, oil, acrylic, watercolor, and book graphics. Hluvko illustrated the book A Millennium of Christian Culture in Ukraine (London, 1988). Author of posters, postcards, programs, and commemorative badges.

Personal exhibitions in London (1980, 1982, 1985), Manchester (1981), Toronto (Canada, 1985), Detroit (US, 1980). From 1982, he participated in international exhibitions, in particular, the World Exhibition of Ukrainian Artists at the Canadian-Ukrainian Art Gallery (1982). Posthumous exhibitions were held at the Kremenets Museum of Local Lore (1997), the National Art Museum of Ukraine (2009, Kyiv).

Main works:

- compositions – "Avtoportret" (1950), "I. Mazepa. Fantaziia" (1976), "Kozaky nesut" (1978), "Richmond-park", "Venetsianska lahuna" (both – 1980s), "A v tuiu sviatuiu ta nedilenku rano" (1981), "Pokhoron Panteleimona Kulisha" (1981, 1984), "Hamaliia" (1984), "Marusia Churai" (1989);
- icons – "Spasytel" (1976), "Matir Bozha", "Bohomatir z Isusom", triptych "Vizd do Yerusalymu", "Sv. Pavlo" (all – 1978), "Borys i Hlib" (1979), "Sv. Yurii", "Pantokrator" (both – 1982), "Khreshchennia Ukrainy", "Isus Khrystos" (both – 1986), "Feodosii Pecherskyi" (1988).

== Honoring ==
In 2003, a book of memoirs Memorabilia was published.

In 2010, a room-museum of the artist was opened at the Kremenets Humanitarian and Pedagogical Institute, where the works presented by his daughter Svitlana are kept.
