= Kuty, Kremenets Raion, Ternopil Oblast =

Rural locality in Ternopil Oblast, Ukraine

Kuty Кути
- Interactive map of Kuty
- Location in Ternopil Oblast Kuty (Ternopil Oblast)
- Coordinates: 50°11′50″N 26°3′27″E
- Country: Ukraine
- Oblast: Ternopil Oblast
- Raion: Kremenets Raion
- Hromada: Shumsk urban hromada

Population (2003)
  - Total: 567
- Time zone: UTC+2 (EET)
  - Summer (DST): UTC+3 (EEST)
- Postal code: 47112

Kuty (Ukrainian: Кути) is a village in Ukraine, Ternopil Oblast, Kremenets Raion, Shumsk urban hromada. After the liquidation of the Shumsk Raion on 19 July 2020, the village became part of the Kremenets Raion.

== Bibliography ==
- (in Ukrainian) Уніят В., Кути // Ternopil Encyclopedic Dictionary: in 4 v. / editorial board: H. Yavorskyi and other, Ternopil: "Zbruch", 2005, V. 2: К—О, S. 297. — ISBN 966-528-199-2.
- "Kuty (2), pow. krzemieniecki". Geographical Dictionary of the Kingdom of Poland (in Polish). 5. Warszawa: Kasa im. Józefa Mianowskiego. 1884. p. 6.
- "Kuty, gm. Szumsk". Geographical Dictionary of the Kingdom of Poland (in Polish). p. 204.
