= Birky, Ternopil Oblast =

Rural locality in Ternopil Oblast, Ukraine

Birky Бірки
- Interactive map of Birky
- Location in Ternopil Oblast Birky (Ternopil Oblast)
- Coordinates: 50°4′43″N 26°1′25″E
- Country: Ukraine
- Oblast: Ternopil Oblast
- Raion: Kremenets Raion
- Hromada: Shumsk urban hromada

Population (2016)
  - Total: 411
- Time zone: UTC+2 (EET)
  - Summer (DST): UTC+3 (EEST)
- Postal code: 47133

Birky (Ukrainian: Бірки) is a village in Ukraine, Ternopil Oblast, Kremenets Raion, Shumsk urban hromada. After the liquidation of the Shumsk Raion on 19 July 2020, the village became part of the Kremenets Raion.

== Bibliography ==
- (in Ukrainian) В. Уніят, Б. Хаварівський., Бірки // Ternopil Encyclopedic Dictionary: in 4 v. / editorial board: H. Yavorskyi and other, Ternopil: "Zbruch", 2004, V. 1: А—Й, S. 140. — ISBN 966-528-197-6.
- "Borki 5.) B., al. Borek, wś, pow. krzemieniecki". Geographical Dictionary of the Kingdom of Poland (in Polish). p. 205.
