= Zaluzhzhia, Kremenets Raion, Ternopil Oblast =

Rural locality in Ternopil Oblast, Ukraine

Zaluzhzhia Залужжя
- Interactive map of Zaluzhzhia
- Location in Ternopil Oblast Zaluzhzhia (Ternopil Oblast)
- Coordinates: 50°8′44″N 26°4′12″E
- Country: Ukraine
- Oblast: Ternopil Oblast
- Raion: Kremenets Raion
- Hromada: Shumsk urban hromada

Population (2018)
  - Total: 338
- Time zone: UTC+2 (EET)
  - Summer (DST): UTC+3 (EEST)
- Postal code: 47105

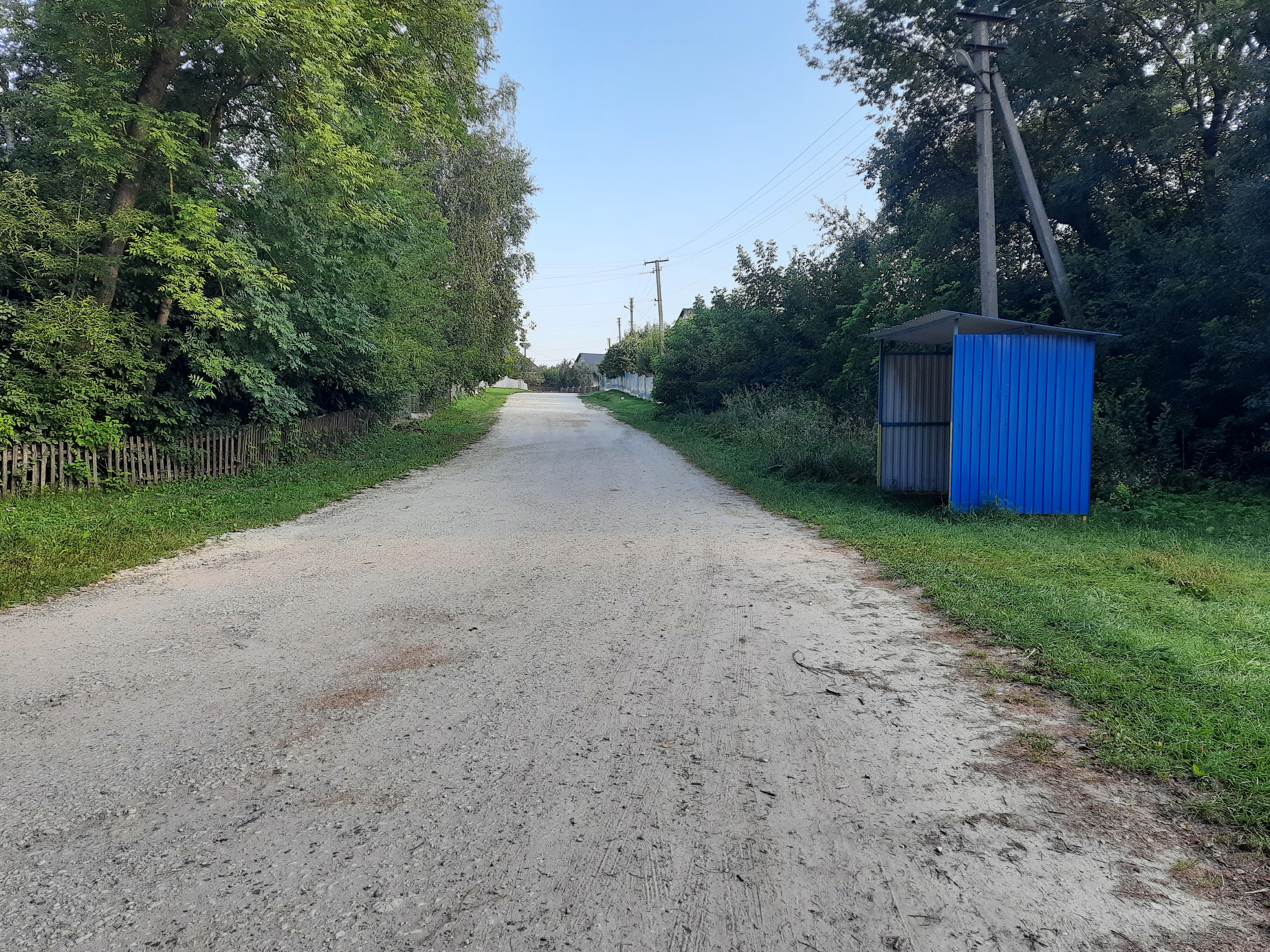
Bus stop for Zaluzhzhya, Kremenetsky district, Ternopil region

Zaluzhzhia (Ukrainian: Залужжя) is a village in Ukraine, Ternopil Oblast, Kremenets Raion, Shumsk urban hromada. After the abolition of the Shumsk Raion on 19 July 2020, the village became part of the Kremenets Raion.

== Bibliography ==
- "Załuże (3)". Geographical Dictionary of the Kingdom of Poland (in Polish). 14. Warszawa: Kasa im. Józefa Mianowskiego. 1895. p. 361.
