= Zalistsi, Shumsk urban hromada, Kremenets Raion, Ternopil Oblast =

Rural locality in Ternopil Oblast, Ukraine

Zalistsi Залісці
- Interactive map of Zalistsi
- Location in Ternopil Oblast Zalistsi (Ternopil Oblast)
- Coordinates: 50°09′27″N 25°59′43″E
- Country: Ukraine
- Oblast: Ternopil Oblast
- Raion: Kremenets Raion
- Hromada: Shumsk urban hromada
- Time zone: UTC+2 (EET)
  - Summer (DST): UTC+3 (EEST)
- Postal code: 47122

Zalistsi (Ukrainian: Залісці) is a village in Ukraine, Ternopil Oblast, Kremenets Raion, Shumsk urban hromada. After the abolition of the Shumsk Raion on 19 July 2020, the village became part of the Kremenets Raion.

== Bibliography ==
- (in Ukrainian) Б. Мельничук, В. Уніят, І. Фарина, І. Федечко., Залісці // Ternopil Oblast. History of cities and villages: in 3 v. / Ternopil: "Terno-graph", 2014, V. 3: М—Ш, S. 557—558. — ISBN 978-966-457-246-7.
- (in Ukrainian) Г. Басюк, Б. Хаварківський, Залісці // Ternopil Encyclopedic Dictionary: in 4 v. / editorial board: H. Yavorskyi and other, Ternopil: "Zbruch", 2004, V. 1: А—Й, S. 607—608. — ISBN 966-528-197-6.
- "Zaleśce 3.) al. Zaliśce Szumskie, wś". Geographical Dictionary of the Kingdom of Poland (in Polish). 14. Warszawa: Kasa im. Józefa Mianowskiego. 1895. p. 329.
