= Vaskivtsi, Ternopil Oblast =

Rural locality in Ternopil Oblast, Ukraine

Vaskivtsi Васьківці
- Interactive map of Vaskivtsi
- Location in Ternopil Oblast Vaskivtsi (Ternopil Oblast)
- Coordinates: 50°9′24″N 26°4′52″E
- Country: Ukraine
- Oblast: Ternopil Oblast
- Raion: Kremenets Raion
- Hromada: Shumsk urban hromada

Population (2003)
  - Total: 835
- Time zone: UTC+2 (EET)
  - Summer (DST): UTC+3 (EEST)
- Postal code: 47113

Vaskivtsi (Ukrainian: Васьківці) is a village in Ukraine, Ternopil Oblast, Kremenets Raion, Shumsk urban hromada. After the liquidation of the Shumsk Raion on 19 July 2020, the village became part of the Kremenets Raion.

== Bibliography ==
- "Waśkowce (pow. krzemieniecki)". Geographical Dictionary of the Kingdom of Poland (in Polish). 13. Warszawa: Kasa im. Józefa Mianowskiego. 1893. p. 133.
