= Litovyshche, Ternopil Oblast =

Rural locality in Ternopil Oblast, Ukraine

Litovyshche Літовище
- Interactive map of Litovyshche
- Location in Ternopil Oblast Litovyshche (Ternopil Oblast)
- Coordinates: 50°11′18″N 26°2′1″E
- Country: Ukraine
- Oblast: Ternopil Oblast
- Raion: Kremenets Raion
- Hromada: Shumsk urban hromada

Population (2016)
  - Total: 361
- Time zone: UTC+2 (EET)
  - Summer (DST): UTC+3 (EEST)
- Postal code: 47112

Litovyshche (Ukrainian: Літовище) is a village in Ukraine, Ternopil Oblast, Kremenets Raion, Shumsk urban hromada. After the liquidation of the Shumsk Raion on 19 July 2020, the village became part of the Kremenets Raion.

== Bibliography ==
- (in Ukrainian) Хаварівський Б., Ханас В., Літовище // Ternopil Encyclopedic Dictionary: in 4 v. / editorial board: H. Yavorskyi and other, Ternopil: "Zbruch", 2005, V. 2: К—О, S. 380. — ISBN 966-528-199-2.
- "Litowiszcze". Geographical Dictionary of the Kingdom of Poland (in Polish). p. 237.
