= Zabara, Ternopil Oblast =

Rural locality in Ternopil Oblast, Ukraine

Zabara Забара
- Interactive map of Zabara
- Location in Ternopil Oblast Zabara (Ternopil Oblast)
- Coordinates: 50°10′3″N 25°57′6″E
- Country: Ukraine
- Oblast: Ternopil Oblast
- Raion: Kremenets Raion
- Hromada: Shumsk urban hromada

Population (2020)
  - Total: 80
- Time zone: UTC+2 (EET)
  - Summer (DST): UTC+3 (EEST)
- Postal code: 47122

Zabara (Ukrainian: Забара) is a village in Ukraine, Ternopil Oblast, Kremenets Raion, Shumsk urban hromada. After the abolition of the Shumsk Raion on 19 July 2020, the village became part of the Kremenets Raion.
