= Velyka Ilovytsia =

Rural locality in Ternopil Oblast, Ukraine

Velyka Ilovytsia Велика Іловиця
- Interactive map of Velyka Ilovytsia
- Location in Ternopil Oblast Velyka Ilovytsia (Ternopil Oblast)
- Coordinates: 50°13′42″N 25°58′28″E
- Country: Ukraine
- Oblast: Ternopil Oblast
- Raion: Kremenets Raion
- Hromada: Shumsk urban hromada

Population (2016)
  - Total: 314
- Time zone: UTC+2 (EET)
  - Summer (DST): UTC+3 (EEST)
- Postal code: 47112

Velyka Ilovytsia (Ukrainian: Велика Іловиця) is a village in Ukraine, Ternopil Oblast, Kremenets Raion, Shumsk urban hromada. After the abolition of the Shumsk Raion on 19 July 2020, the village became part of the Kremenets Raion.

== Bibliography ==
- "Iłowica Duża". Geographical Dictionary of the Kingdom of Poland (in Polish). p. 609.
