= Mali Sadky =

Rural locality in Ternopil Oblast, Ukraine

Mali Sadky Малі Садки
- Interactive map of Mali Sadky
- Location in Ternopil Oblast Mali Sadky (Ternopil Oblast)
- Coordinates: 50°9′58″N 26°6′57″E
- Country: Ukraine
- Oblast: Ternopil Oblast
- Raion: Kremenets Raion
- Hromada: Shumsk urban hromada

Population (2001)
  - Total: 86
- Time zone: UTC+2 (EET)
  - Summer (DST): UTC+3 (EEST)
- Postal code: 47114

Mali Sadky (Ukrainian: Малі Садки) is a village in Ukraine, Ternopil Oblast, Kremenets Raion, Shumsk urban hromada. After the liquidation of the Shumsk Raion on 19 July 2020, the village became part of the Kremenets Raion.

== Bibliography ==
- (in Ukrainian) Хвесюк Е., Малі Садки // Ternopil Encyclopedic Dictionary: in 4 v. / editorial board: H. Yavorskyi and other, Ternopil: "Zbruch", 2005, V. 2: К—О, S. 448. — ISBN 966-528-199-2.
- "Sadeczki Małe, gm. Szumsk". Geographical Dictionary of the Kingdom of Poland (in Polish). p. 569.
