= Shumbar =

Rural locality in Ternopil Oblast, Ukraine

Shumbar Шумбар
- Interactive map of Shumbar
- Location in Ternopil Oblast Shumbar (Ternopil Oblast)
- Coordinates: 50°2′16″N 26°1′20″E
- Country: Ukraine
- Oblast: Ternopil Oblast
- Raion: Kremenets Raion
- Hromada: Shumsk urban hromada

Population (2014)
  - Total: 746
- Time zone: UTC+2 (EET)
  - Summer (DST): UTC+3 (EEST)
- Postal code: 47133

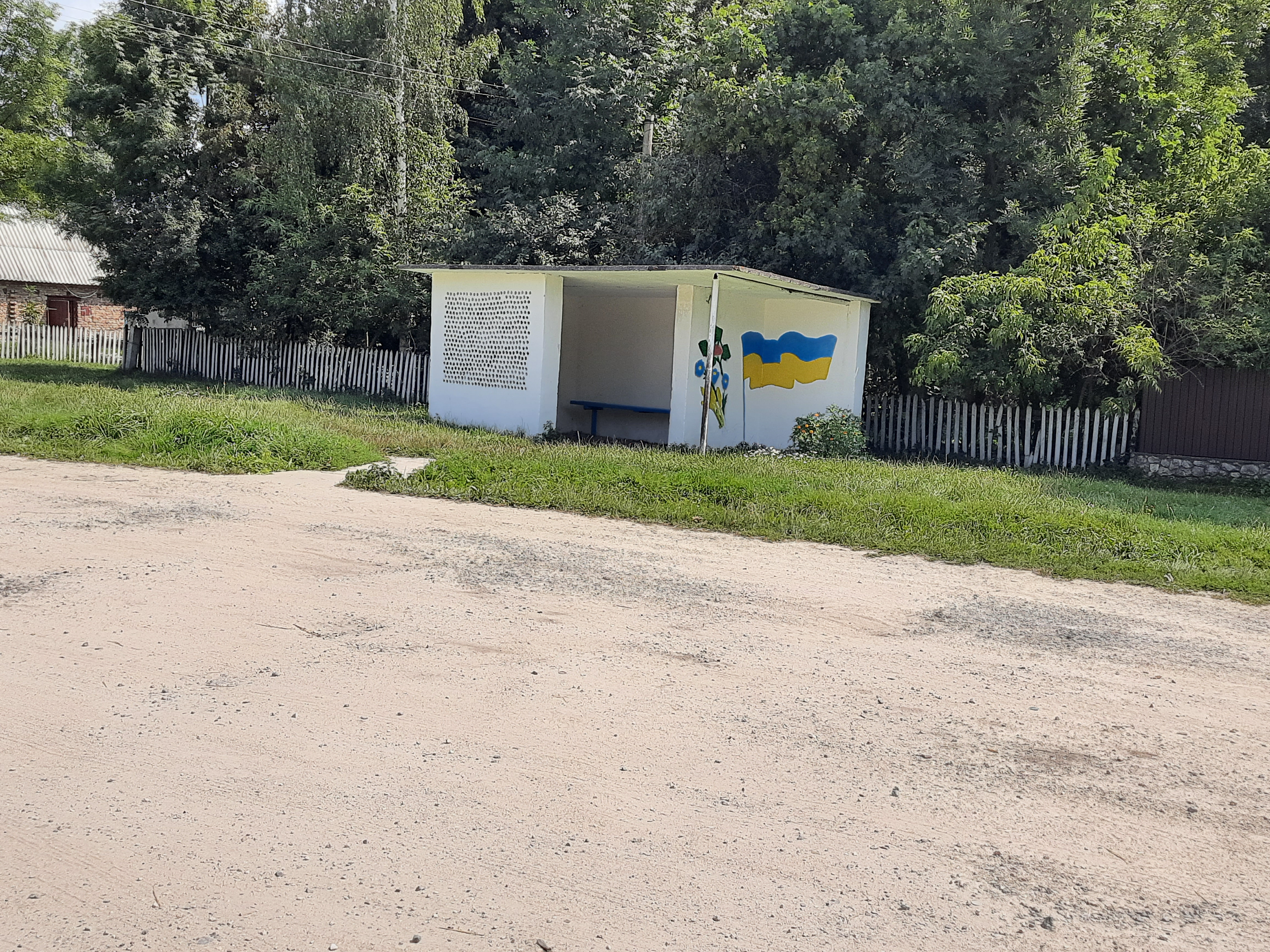
Bus stop Shumbar Kremenetsky district, Ternopil region

Shumbar (Ukrainian: Шумбар) is a village in Ukraine, Ternopil Oblast, Kremenets Raion, Shumsk urban hromada. After the liquidation of the Shumsk Raion on 19 July 2020, the village became part of the Kremenets Raion.

== Bibliography ==
- (in Ukrainian) Бігус М., Хаварівський Б., Шумбар // Ternopil Encyclopedic Dictionary: in 4 v. / editorial board: H. Yavorskyi and other, Ternopil: "Zbruch", 2008, V. 3: П—Я, S. 654—655. — ISBN 978-966-528-279-2.
- "Szumbar". Geographical Dictionary of the Kingdom of Poland (in Polish). 12. Warszawa: Kasa im. Józefa Mianowskiego. 1892. p. 71.
