= Mala Ilovytsia =

Rural locality in Ternopil Oblast, Ukraine

Mala Ilovytsia Мала Іловиця
- Interactive map of Mala Ilovytsia
- Location in Ternopil Oblast Mala Ilovytsia (Ternopil Oblast)
- Coordinates: 50°12′54″N 25°59′27″E
- Country: Ukraine
- Oblast: Ternopil Oblast
- Raion: Kremenets Raion
- Hromada: Shumsk urban hromada

Population (2016)
  - Total: 208
- Time zone: UTC+2 (EET)
  - Summer (DST): UTC+3 (EEST)
- Postal code: 47112

Mala Ilovytsia (Ukrainian: Мала Іловиця) is a village in Ukraine, Ternopil Oblast, Kremenets Raion, Shumsk urban hromada. After the liquidation of the Shumsk Raion on 19 July 2020, the village became part of the Kremenets Raion.

== Bibliography ==
- (in Ukrainian) Петрук Г., Мала Іловиця // Ternopil Encyclopedic Dictionary: in 4 v. / editorial board: H. Yavorskyi and other, Ternopil: "Zbruch", 2005, V. 2: К—О, S. 437. — ISBN 966-528-199-2.
- "Iłowica Mała". Geographical Dictionary of the Kingdom of Poland (in Polish). p. 609.
