= Stizhok =

Rural locality in Ternopil Oblast, Ukraine

Stizhok Стіжок
- Interactive map of Stizhok
- Location in Ternopil Oblast Stizhok (Ternopil Oblast)
- Coordinates: 50°10′47″N 25°51′57″E
- Country: Ukraine
- Oblast: Ternopil Oblast
- Raion: Kremenets Raion
- Hromada: Shumsk urban hromada

Population (2016)
  - Total: 368
- Time zone: UTC+2 (EET)
  - Summer (DST): UTC+3 (EEST)
- Postal code: 47120

Stizhok (Ukrainian: Стіжок) is a village in Ukraine, Ternopil Oblast, Kremenets Raion, Shumsk urban hromada. After the liquidation of the Shumsk Raion on 19 July 2020, the village became part of the Kremenets Raion.

== Bibliography ==
- (in Ukrainian) М. Бесараб, В. Уніят., Стіжок // Ternopil Encyclopedic Dictionary: in 4 v. / editorial board: H. Yavorskyi and other, Ternopil: "Zbruch", 2008, V. 3: П—Я, S. 354–355. — ISBN 978-966-528-279-2.
- "Stożek". Geographical Dictionary of the Kingdom of Poland (in Polish). 11. Warszawa: Kasa im. Józefa Mianowskiego. 1890. p. 378-379.
