= Rokhmaniv =

Rural locality in Ternopil Oblast, Ukraine

Rokhmaniv Рохманів
- Location within Ternopil Oblast
- Coordinates: 50°07′40″N 26°4′25″E
- Country: Ukraine
- Oblast: Ternopil Oblast
- Raion: Kremenets Raion
- First mentioned: 1513 (as Pihasy)

Area
  - Total: 3,001 km^{2} (1,159 sq mi)

Population (2001 census)
  - Total: 769
  - Density: 256.25/km^{2} (663.7/sq mi)
- Time zone: UTC+2 (EET)
  - Summer (DST): UTC+3 (EEST)
- Postal code: 47105
- Area code: +380 3558

Rokhmaniv (Ukrainian: Рохманів, Polish: Rachmanów) is a village in Kremenets Raion (district) of Ternopil Oblast (province) in western Ukraine near Kremenets in historical province of Volhynia. It belongs to Shumsk urban hromada, one of the hromadas of Ukraine.

== History ==
The village is mentioned since 1513 as Pihasy that belonged to Litvin boyar Mykhailo Bohush as most of the today's territory of Shumsk Raion. The descendant of Mykhailo Bohush, Waclaw Bohowityn, married Zofia Michajlowna Czartoryska (Czartoryski) who after the death of her husband became the owner of the settlement. After her death, the settlement was transferred to her brothers Jerzy and Michal Czartoryski. On 10 December 1605 Jerzy Chartoryski gave up his estate to the Prince Michał Wiśniowiecki and his wife Regina Wisniowiecka (née Mohilanka). In 1675-76 the town was completely destroyed by Tatars.

Later Rokhmaniv belonged to Mikołaj Bazyli Potocki and other members of Potocki family.

Until 18 July 2020, Rokhmaniv belonged to Shumsk Raion. The raion was abolished in July 2020 as part of the administrative reform of Ukraine, which reduced the number of raions of Ternopil Oblast to three. The area of Shumsk Raion was merged into Kremenets Raion.
