= Oderadivka =

Rural locality in Ternopil Oblast, Ukraine

Odedarivka Одедарівка
- Interactive map of Odedarivka
- Location in Ternopil Oblast Odedarivka (Ternopil Oblast)
- Coordinates: 50°6′35″N 25°56′24″E
- Country: Ukraine
- Oblast: Ternopil Oblast
- Raion: Kremenets Raion
- Hromada: Shumsk urban hromada

Population (2014)
  - Total: 82
- Time zone: UTC+2 (EET)
  - Summer (DST): UTC+3 (EEST)
- Postal code: 47124

Odedarivka (Ukrainian: Одедарівка) is a village in Ukraine, Ternopil Oblast, Kremenets Raion, Shumsk urban hromada. After the liquidation of the Shumsk Raion on 19 July 2020, the village became part of the Kremenets Raion.

== Bibliography ==
- "Oderadówka". Geographical Dictionary of the Kingdom of Poland (in Polish). p. 400.
