= Tyliavka =

Rural locality in Ternopil Oblast, Ukraine

Tyliavka Тилявка
- Location in Ternopil Oblast
- Coordinates: 50°7′40″N 25°54′36″E
- Country: Ukraine
- Oblast: Ternopil Oblast
- Raion: Kremenets Raion
- Hromada: Shumsk urban hromada
- Time zone: UTC+2 (EET)
  - Summer (DST): UTC+3 (EEST)
- Postal code: 47124

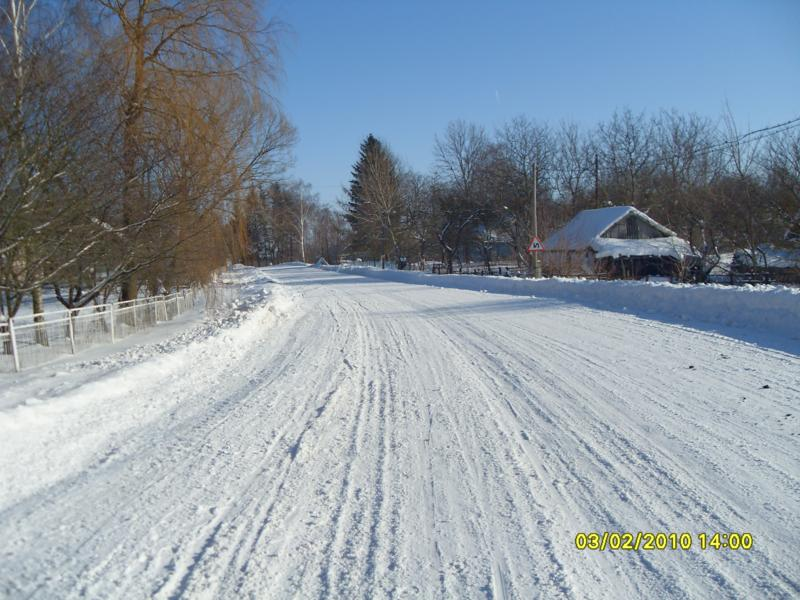

Tyliavka (Ukrainian: Tyliavka) is a village in the Shumsk urban hromada of the Kremenets Raion of Ternopil Oblast in Ukraine.

== History ==
The first written mention of the village was in 1545.

On 19 July 2020, as a result of the administrative-territorial reform and liquidation of the Shumsk Raion, the village became part of the Kremenets Raion.

== Religion ==
- Church of the Exaltation of the Holy Cross (1938, built on the site of the old wooden church of 1793).

== Notable residents ==
The village was home to the Ukrainian writer Ulas Samchuk.

== Sources ==
- (in Ukrainian) Бесараб М., Уніят В., Тилявка // Ternopil Encyclopedic Dictionary: in 4 v. / editorial board: H. Yavorskyi and other, Ternopil: "Zbruch", 2008, V. 3: П—Я, S. 442. — ISBN 978-966-528-279-2.
- "Telawa". Geographical Dictionary of the Kingdom of Poland (in Polish). 12. Warszawa: Kasa im. Józefa Mianowskiego. 1892. p. 282.
- "Tylawka". Geographical Dictionary of the Kingdom of Poland (in Polish). 12. Warszawa: Kasa im. Józefa Mianowskiego. 1892. p. 698.
- "Tylawka". Geographical Dictionary of the Kingdom of Poland (in Polish). p. 670.
