= Potutoriv =

Rural locality in Ternopil Oblast, Ukraine

Potutoriv Потуторів
- Interactive map of Potutoriv
- Location in Ternopil Oblast Potutoriv (Ternopil Oblast)
- Coordinates: 50°4′3″N 26°8′41″E
- Country: Ukraine
- Oblast: Ternopil Oblast
- Raion: Kremenets Raion
- Hromada: Shumsk urban hromada

Population (2001)
  - Total: 513
- Time zone: UTC+2 (EET)
  - Summer (DST): UTC+3 (EEST)
- Postal code: 47142

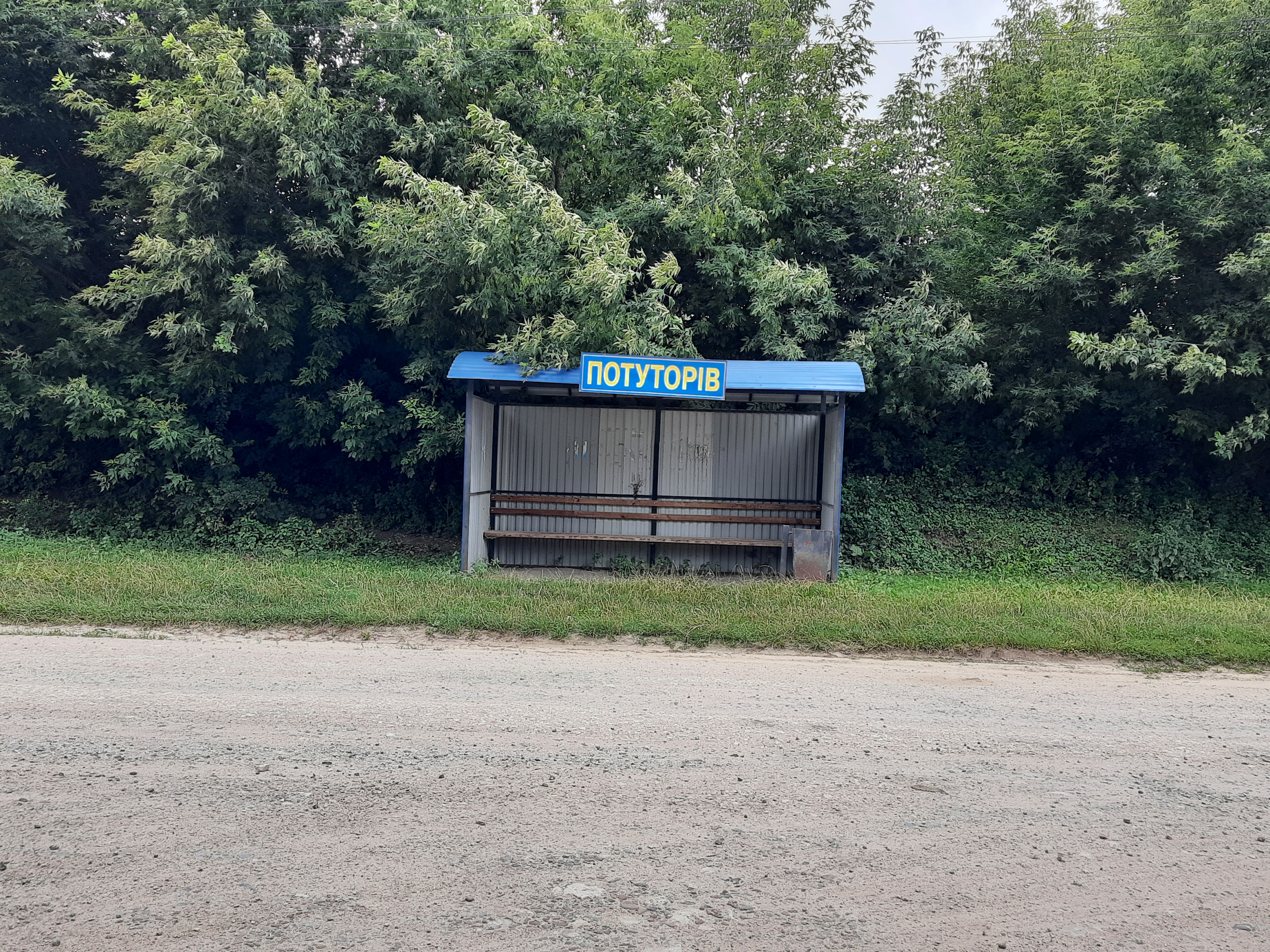
Potutoriv bus stop

Potutoriv (Ukrainian: Потуторів) is a village in Ukraine, Ternopil Oblast, Kremenets Raion, Shumsk urban hromada. After the liquidation of the Shumsk Raion on 19 July 2020, the village became part of the Kremenets Raion.

== Bibliography ==
- "Potuturów, pow. krzemieniecki". Geographical Dictionary of the Kingdom of Poland (in Polish). 8. Warszawa: Kasa im. Józefa Mianowskiego. 1887. p. 877.
