= Uhorsk =

Rural locality in Ternopil Oblast, Ukraine

Uhorsk Угорськ
- Interactive map of Uhorsk
- Location in Ternopil Oblast Uhorsk (Ternopil Oblast)
- Coordinates: 50°9′14″N 25°54′38″E
- Country: Ukraine
- Oblast: Ternopil Oblast
- Raion: Kremenets Raion
- Hromada: Shumsk urban hromada

Population (2016)
  - Total: 597
- Time zone: UTC+2 (EET)
  - Summer (DST): UTC+3 (EEST)
- Postal code: 47121

Uhorsk (Ukrainian: Угорськ) is a village in Ukraine, Ternopil Oblast, Kremenets Raion, Shumsk urban hromada. After the liquidation of the Shumsk Raion on 19 July 2020, the village became part of the Kremenets Raion.

== Bibliography ==
- (in Ukrainian) М. Бесараб, В. Уніят, Угорськ // Ternopil Encyclopedic Dictionary: in 4 v. / editorial board: H. Yavorskyi and other, Ternopil: "Zbruch", 2008, V. 3: П—Я, S. 482. — ISBN 978-966-528-279-2.
