= Obych =

Rural locality in Ternopil Oblast, Ukraine

Obych Обич
- Interactive map of Obych
- Location in Ternopil Oblast Obych (Ternopil Oblast)
- Coordinates: 50°8′29″N 26°1′33″E
- Country: Ukraine
- Oblast: Ternopil Oblast
- Raion: Kremenets Raion
- Hromada: Shumsk urban hromada

Population (2018)
  - Total: 598
- Time zone: UTC+2 (EET)
  - Summer (DST): UTC+3 (EEST)
- Postal code: 47105

Obych (Ukrainian: Обич) is a village in Ukraine, Ternopil Oblast, Kremenets Raion, Shumsk urban hromada. After the liquidation of the Shumsk Raion on 19 July 2020, the village became part of the Kremenets Raion.

== Bibliography ==
- "Obycz". Geographical Dictionary of the Kingdom of Poland (in Polish). 7. Warszawa: Kasa im. Józefa Mianowskiego. 1886. p. 359.
- (in Ukrainian) Бесараб М., Кобернюк В., Обич // Ternopil Encyclopedic Dictionary: in 4 v. / editorial board: H. Yavorskyi and other, Ternopil: "Zbruch", 2005, V. 2: К—О, S. 649. — ISBN 966-528-199-2.
