= Bashkivtsi =

Rural locality in Ternopil Oblast, Ukraine

Bashkivtsi Башківці
- Interactive map of Bashkivtsi
- Location in Ternopil Oblast Bashkivtsi (Ternopil Oblast)
- Coordinates: 50°07′23″N 25°50′55″E
- Country: Ukraine
- Oblast: Ternopil Oblast
- Raion: Kremenets Raion
- Hromada: Shumsk urban hromada

Population (2016)
  - Total: 215
- Time zone: UTC+2 (EET)
  - Summer (DST): UTC+3 (EEST)
- Postal code: 47124

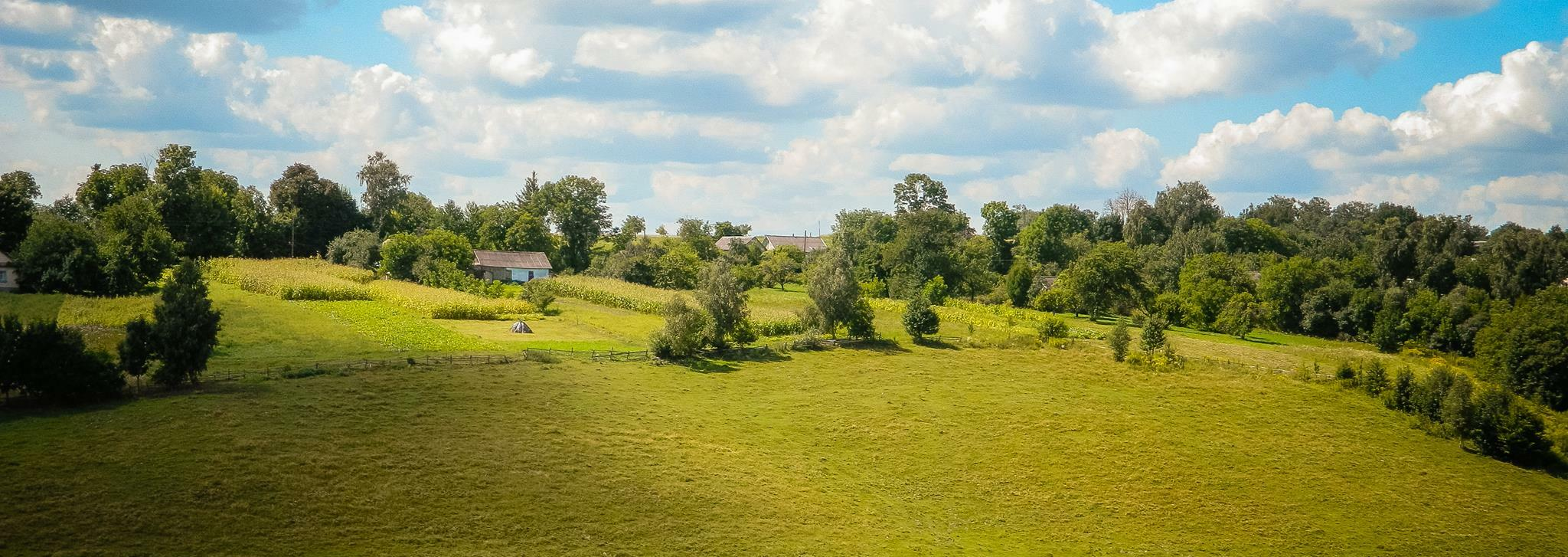
Surroundings of the village of Bashkivtsi, Shumsky district, Ternopil region

Bashkivtsi (Ukrainian: Башківці) is a village in Ukraine, Ternopil Oblast, Kremenets Raion, Shumsk urban hromada. After the liquidation of the Shumsk Raion on 19 July 2020, the village became part of the Kremenets Raion.

== Bibliography ==
- (in Ukrainian) Б. Хаварівський., Башківці // Ternopil Encyclopedic Dictionary: in 4 v. / editorial board: H. Yavorskyi and other, Ternopil: "Zbruch", 2004, V. 1: А—Й, S. 93. — ISBN 966-528-197-6.
- "Baszkowce". Geographical Dictionary of the Kingdom of Poland (in Polish). p. 91.
