= Kordyshiv =

Rural locality in Ternopil Oblast, Ukraine

Kordyshiv Кордишів
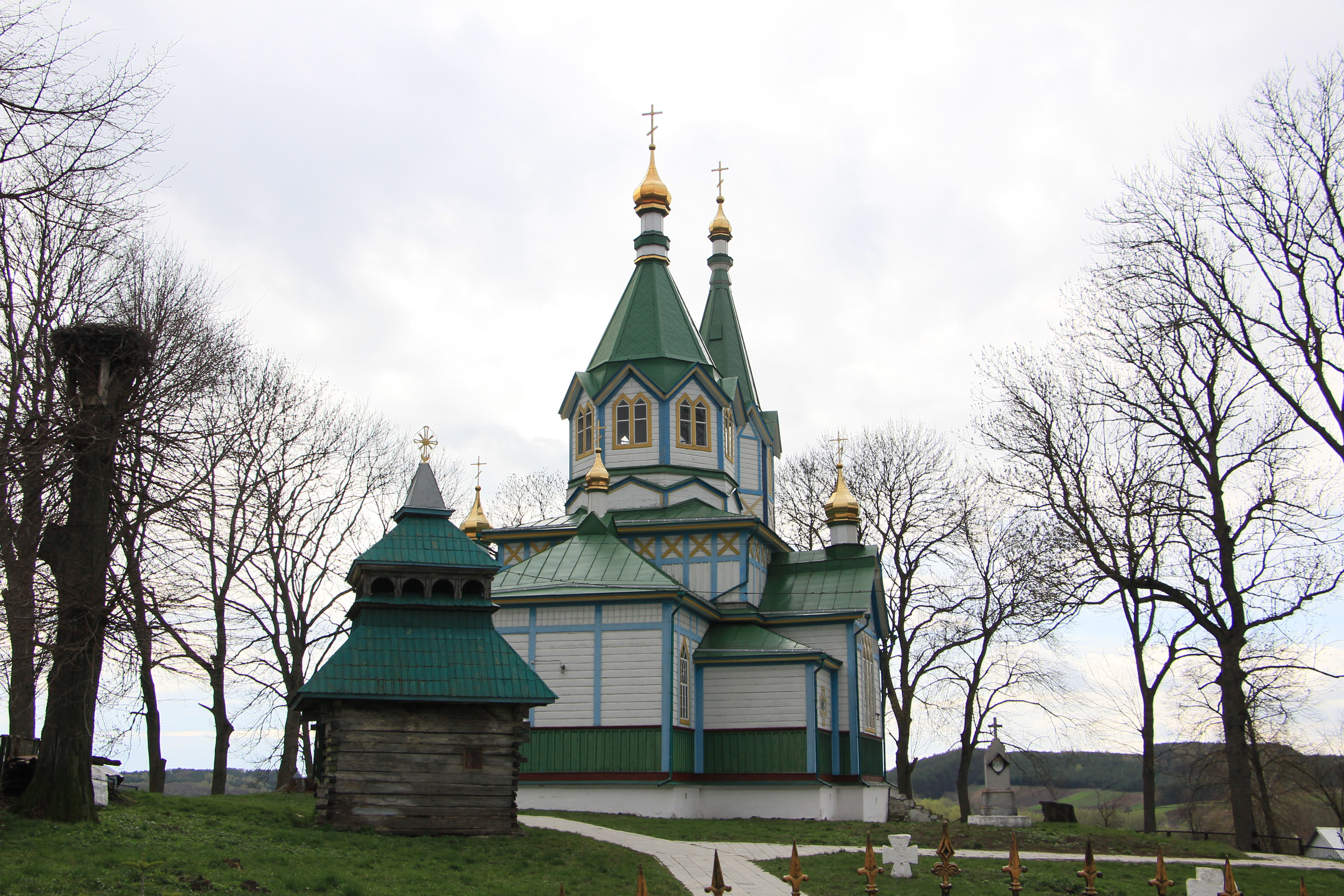
- Interactive map of Kordyshiv
- Location in Ternopil Oblast Kordyshiv (Ternopil Oblast)
- Coordinates: 50°5′27″N 26°3′26″E
- Country: Ukraine
- Oblast: Ternopil Oblast
- Raion: Kremenets Raion
- Hromada: Shumsk urban hromada

Population (2016)
  - Total: 485
- Time zone: UTC+2 (EET)
  - Summer (DST): UTC+3 (EEST)
- Postal code: 47131

Kordyshiv (Ukrainian: Кордишів) is a village in Ukraine, Ternopil Oblast, Kremenets Raion, Shumsk urban hromada. After the abolition of the Shumsk Raion on 19 July 2020, the village became part of the Kremenets Raion.

== Bibliography ==
- (in Ukrainian) В. Гончаренко, В. Уніят., Кордишів // Ternopil Encyclopedic Dictionary: in 4 v. / editorial board: H. Yavorskyi and other, Ternopil: "Zbruch", 2005, V. 2: К—О, S. 170–171. — ISBN 966-528-199-2.
- (in Ukrainian) І. Фарина, І. Федечко., Кордишів // Ternopil Oblast. History of cities and villages: in 3 v. / Ternopil: "Terno-graph", 2014, V. 3: М—Ш, S. 559—560. — ISBN 978-966-457-246-7.
- "Kordyszów, wś niedaleko Szumbaru". Geographical Dictionary of the Kingdom of Poland (in Polish). 4. Warszawa: Kasa im. Józefa Mianowskiego. 1883. p. 400.
- "Kordyszów, gm. Szumsk". Geographical Dictionary of the Kingdom of Poland (in Polish). p. 124.
