= Zholobky =

Rural locality in Ternopil Oblast, Ukraine

Zholobky Жолобки
- Interactive map of Zholobky
- Location in Ternopil Oblast Zholobky (Ternopil Oblast)
- Coordinates: 50°7′31″N 25°58′37″E
- Country: Ukraine
- Oblast: Ternopil Oblast
- Raion: Kremenets Raion
- Hromada: Shumsk urban hromada

Population (2016)
  - Total: 452
- Time zone: UTC+2 (EET)
  - Summer (DST): UTC+3 (EEST)
- Postal code: 47125

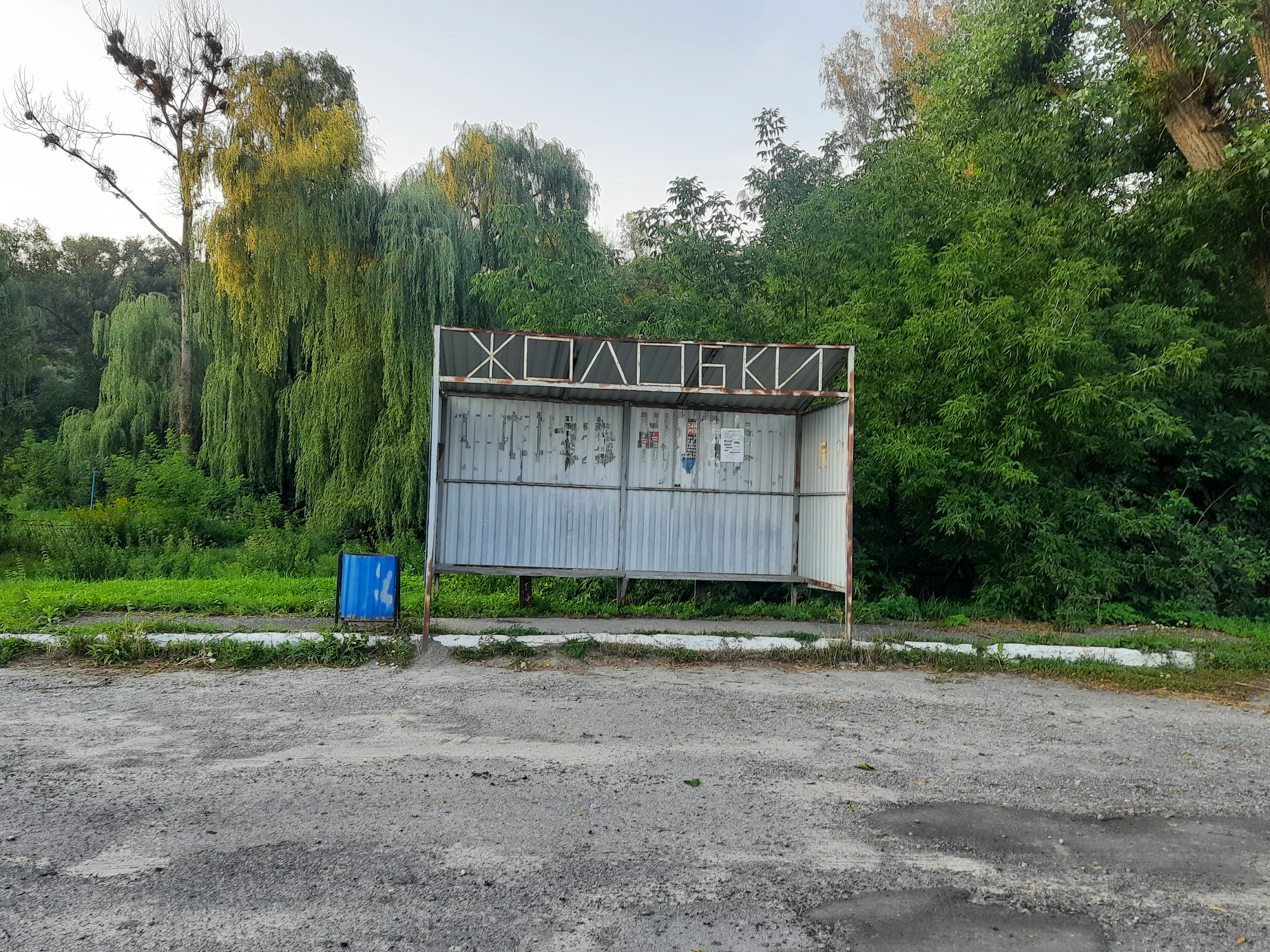
Bus stop village Zholobky Kremenetsky district, Ternopil region

Zholobky (Ukrainian: Жолобки) is a village in Ukraine, Ternopil Oblast, Kremenets Raion, Shumsk urban hromada. After the abolition of the Shumsk Raion on 19 July 2020, the village became part of the Kremenets Raion.

== Bibliography ==
- "Żołobki". Geographical Dictionary of the Kingdom of Poland (in Polish). 14. Warszawa: Kasa im. Józefa Mianowskiego. 1895. p. 824.
- "Żołobki". Geographical Dictionary of the Kingdom of Poland (in Polish). p. 726.
