= Surazh (village) =

Rural locality in Ternopil Oblast, Ukraine

Surazh Сураж
- Location in Ternopil Oblast
- Coordinates: 50°8′48″N 26°10′59″E
- Country: Ukraine
- Oblast: Ternopil Oblast
- Raion: Kremenets Raion
- Hromada: Shumsk urban hromada
- Time zone: UTC+2 (EET)
  - Summer (DST): UTC+3 (EEST)
- Postal code: 47114

Surazh (Ukrainian: Сураж) is a village in the Shumsk urban hromada of the Kremenets Raion of Ternopil Oblast in Ukraine.

== History ==
The first written mention of the village was in 1390.

After the liquidation of the Shumsk Raion on 19 July 2020, the village became part of the Kremenets Raion.

== Religion ==
- Church of the Nativity of the Blessed Virgin Mary (1730, brick).

== Notable residents ==
- Rostyslav Hluvko (1927–1990), Ukrainian artist, graphic artist, and public figure

== Sources ==
- (in Ukrainian) Клименко О., Ніколюк М., Сураж // Ternopil Encyclopedic Dictionary: in 4 v. / editorial board: H. Yavorskyi and other, Ternopil: "Zbruch", 2008, V. 3: П—Я, S. 371–372. — ISBN 978-966-528-279-2.
- "Suraż nad Wilią". Geographical Dictionary of the Kingdom of Poland (in Polish). 11. Warszawa: Kasa im. Józefa Mianowskiego. 1890. p. 595.
