= Myrove (village) =

Rural locality in Ternopil Oblast, Ukraine

Myrove Мирове
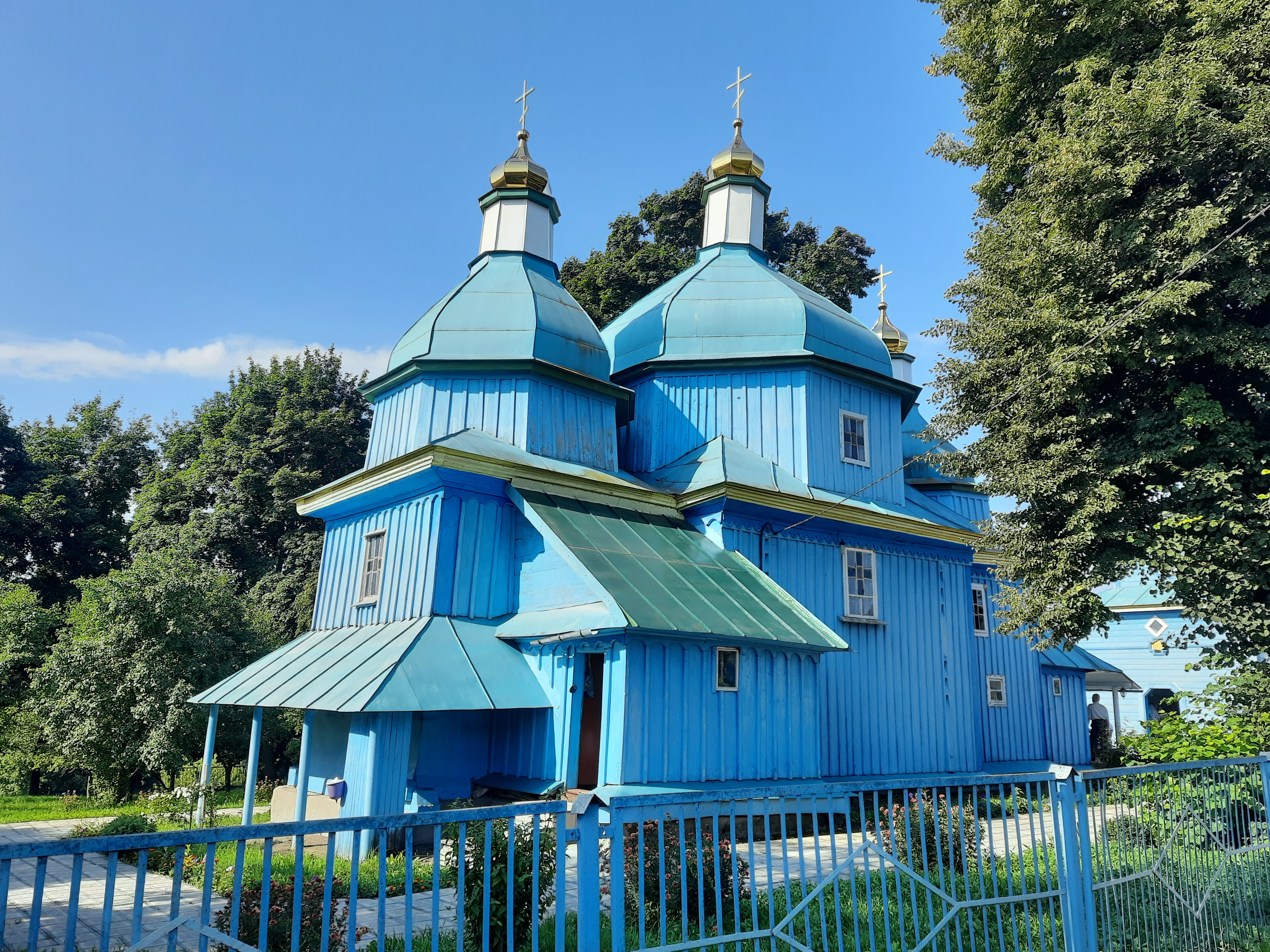
- Saint Michael church
- Interactive map of Myrove
- Location in Ternopil Oblast Myrove (Ternopil Oblast)
- Coordinates: 50°6′14″N 26°4′31″E
- Country: Ukraine
- Oblast: Ternopil Oblast
- Raion: Kremenets Raion
- Hromada: Shumsk urban hromada

Population (2016)
  - Total: 427
- Time zone: UTC+2 (EET)
  - Summer (DST): UTC+3 (EEST)
- Postal code: 47131

Myrove (Ukrainian: Мирове) is a village in Ukraine, Ternopil Oblast, Kremenets Raion, Shumsk urban hromada. After the liquidation of the Shumsk Raion on 19 July 2020, the village became part of the Kremenets Raion.

== Bibliography ==
- (in Ukrainian) Задачина С., Мирове // Ternopil Encyclopedic Dictionary: in 4 v. / editorial board: H. Yavorskyi and other, Ternopil: "Zbruch", 2005, V. 2: К—О, S. 516. — ISBN 966-528-199-2.
- "Hołybisy, wś, powiat krzemieniecki, gm. Szumsk". Geographical Dictionary of the Kingdom of Poland (in Polish). p. 572.
