= Velyki Dederkaly =

Village in Ternopil Oblast, Ukraine

Velyki Dederkaly Великі Дедеркали
- Village
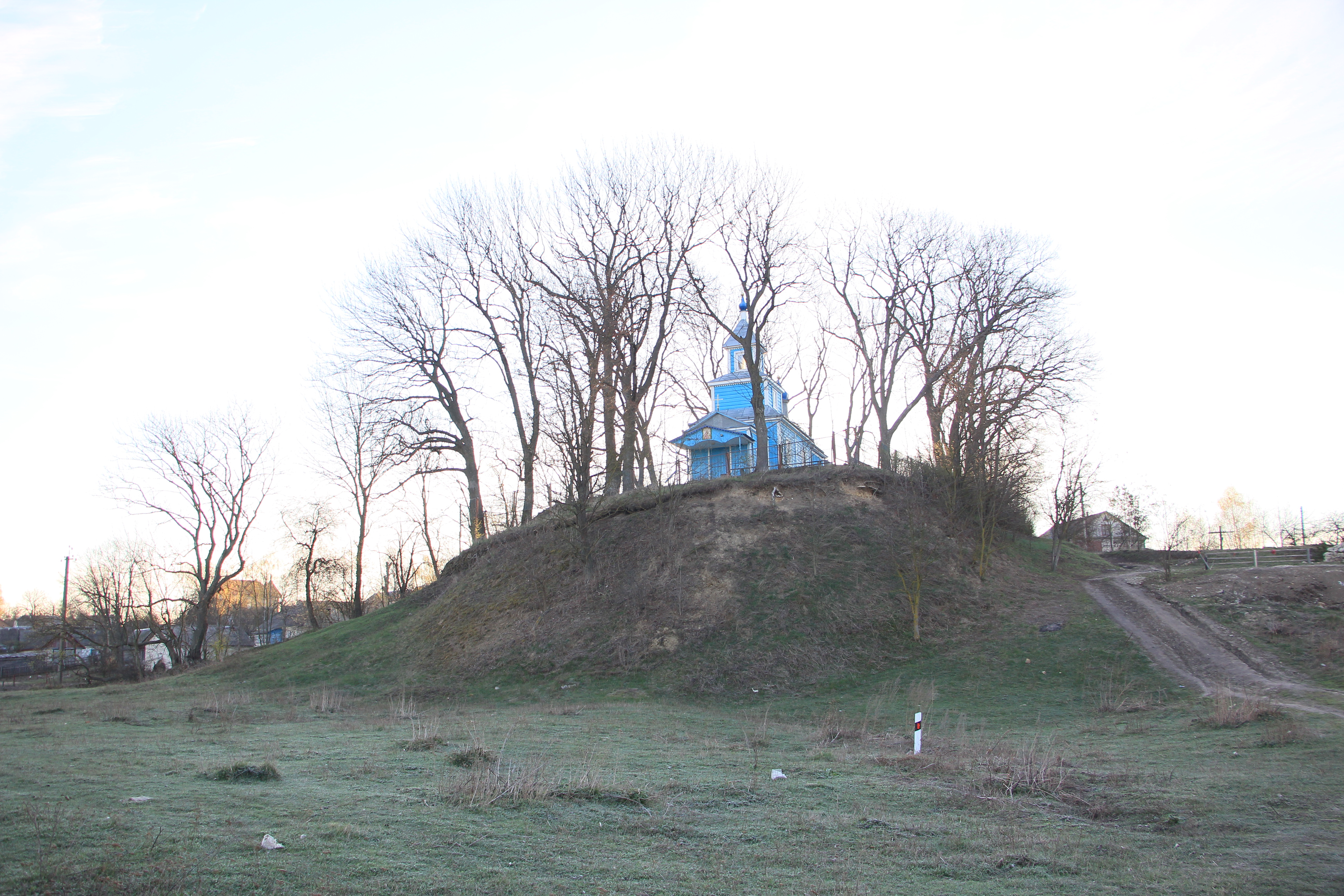

- Location within Ternopil Oblast Location within Ukraine
- Coordinates: 50°1′30″N 26°7′0″E
- Country: Ukraine
- Oblast: Ternopil Oblast
- District: Kremenets Raion

Population (2001)
  - Total: 1,207
  - Estimate (2025): 923
- Time zone: UTC+2 (EET)
  - Summer (DST): UTC+3 (EEST)

Velyki Dederkaly (Ukrainian: Великі Дедеркали, Polish: Dederkały Wielkie) is a village in Kremenets Raion, Ternopil Oblast, Ukraine. It hosts the administration of Velyki Dederkaly rural hromada, one of the hromadas of Ukraine.

Until 18 July 2020, Velyki Dederkaly was located in Shumsk Raion. The raion was abolished in July 2020 as part of the administrative reform of Ukraine, which reduced the number of raions of Ternopil Oblast to three. The area of Shumsk Raion was merged into Kremenets Raion.
