= Horishnia Vyhnanka =

Horishnia Vyhnanka Горішня Вигнанка
- Village
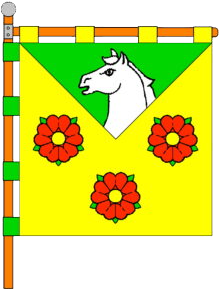
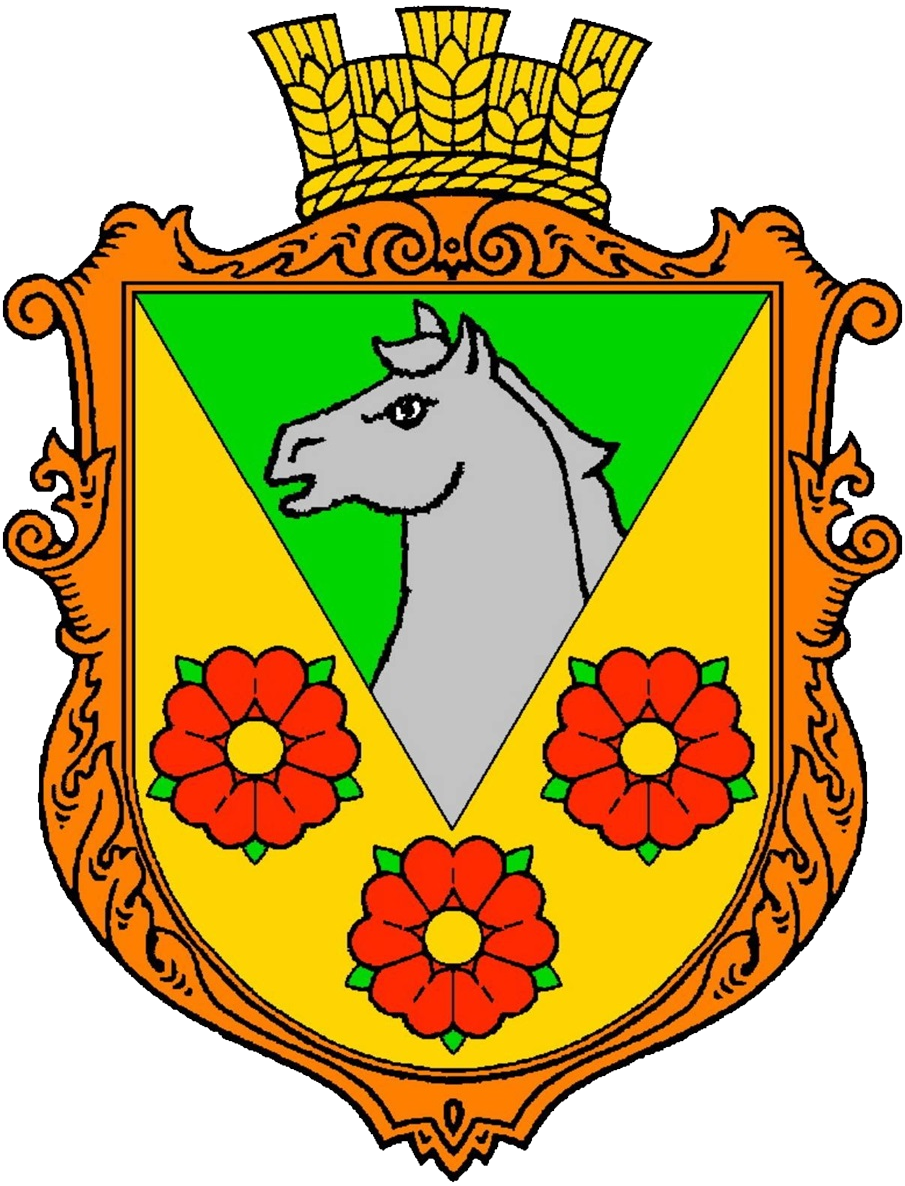
- Flag Coat of arms

- Location within Ternopil Oblast
- Coordinates: 49°01′36″N 25°48′24″E
- Country: Ukraine
- Oblast: Ternopil Oblast
- Raion: Chortkiv Raion
- Hromada: Chortkiv urban hromada
- Established: 1518

Area
  - Total: 16.53 km^{2} (6.38 sq mi)
- Elevation /(average value of): 314 m (1,030 ft)

Population
  - Total: 1,008
  - Density: 616.41/km^{2} (1,596.5/sq mi)
- Time zone: UTC+2 (EET)
  - Summer (DST): UTC+3 (EEST)
- Postal code: 48515
- Area code: +380 3552
- Website: село Горішня Вигнанка^{(Ukrainian)}

Horishnia Vyhnanka (Ukrainian: Горішня Вигнанка; Polish: Wygnanka Górna) is a village located in Chortkiv Raion (district) of Ternopil Oblast (province of Western Ukraine). It belongs to Chortkiv urban hromada, one of the hromadas of Ukraine. The population of the village is 1008 people and covers an area of 16.53 km^{2}

Local government was administered by Horishnia Vyhnanka Village Council before its abolishment during the 2020 administrative reform. The village of Perekhody also belonged to the village council.

== Geography ==
The village is situated on the high left bank of the Seret River. That is located at a distance of 5 kilometres (3.1 mi) from the district center of Chortkiv and 74 kilometres (46 mi) from the regional center Ternopil.

== History ==
The remains of settlements Tripoli culture discovered in the village (3rd millennium BC) but the first record of the village dates back to 1518.
From 11th century to 1144 the village was part of the Principality of Terebovlia, then the Principality of Galicia–Volhynia, and in 1387 came under the power of feudal Poland.
