= Zadariv =

Coordinates: 49°03′19″N 25°02′12″E

Zadariv (Ukrainian: Зада́рів) is a village in Ukraine located in the Chortkiv Raion of Ternopil Oblast. Zadariv is situated in a valley on the river Zolota Lypa (Ukrainian: Золота Липа, Polish: Złota Lipa) in Western Ukraine.

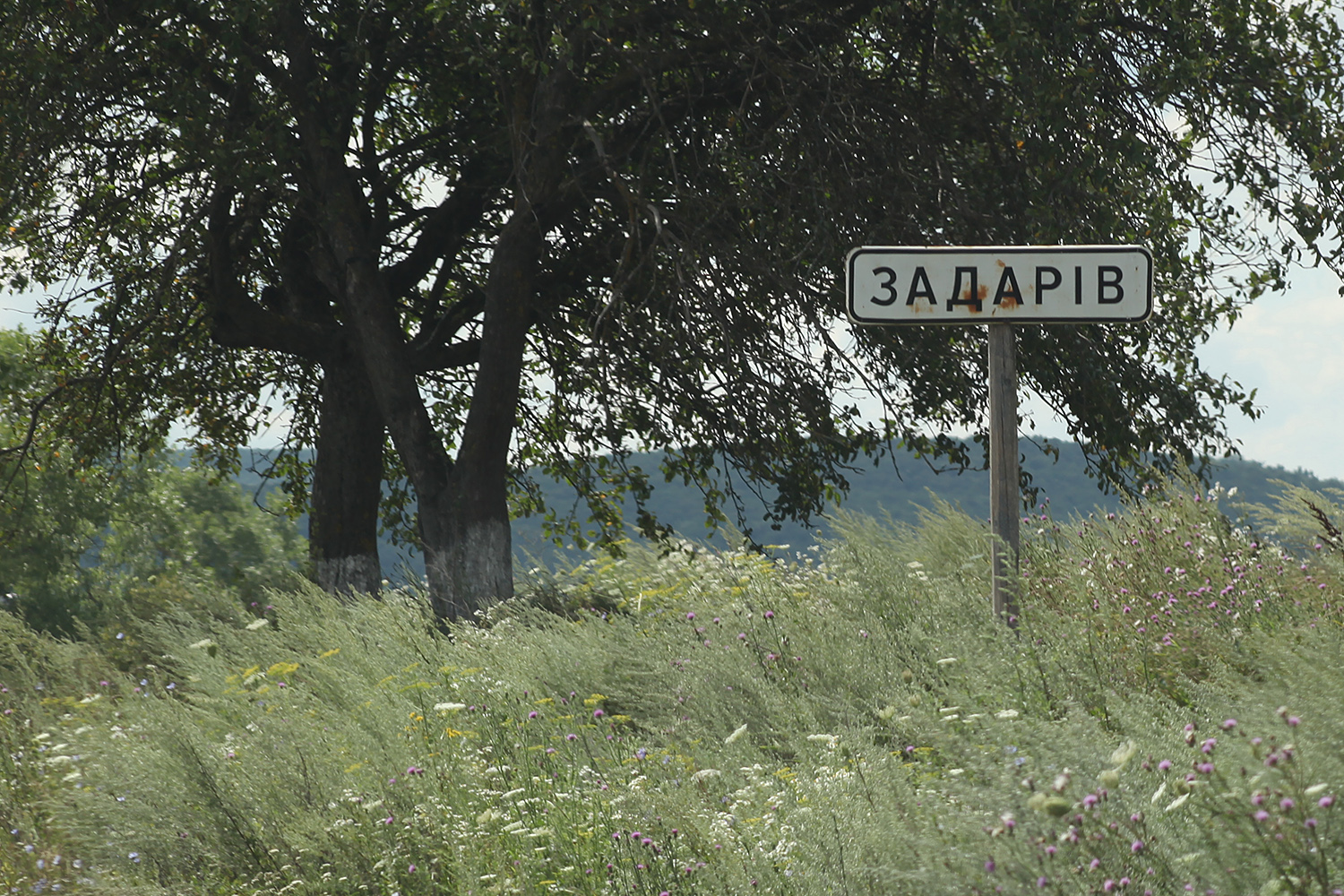
Boundary sign upon entry to Zadariv

In 2014, Zadariv had a population of 950 inhabitants.

== History ==
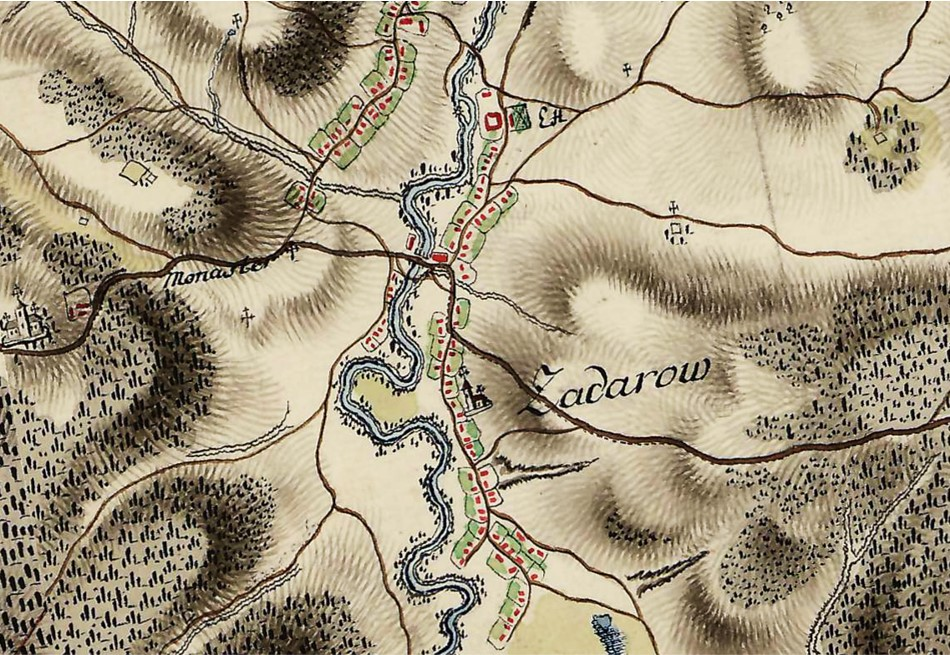
Early Zadariv depicted in the Topographic map of Galicia (1779–1783) held at the Vienna War Archives

The first mentions of the village date back to 1392, the year of the recorded death of the Polish nobleman Michał Mużyło Buczacki, thought to be the owner or occupier of Zadariv.

The first written record of the settlement is in 1473.

Archaeological monuments of the Late Paleolithic, Trypillia, Trzciniec, Gáva-Holigrady and Chernyakhiv cultures, and Roman coins of the first centuries AD were discovered near Zadariv.
