= Perekhody =

Perekhody Переходи
- Village
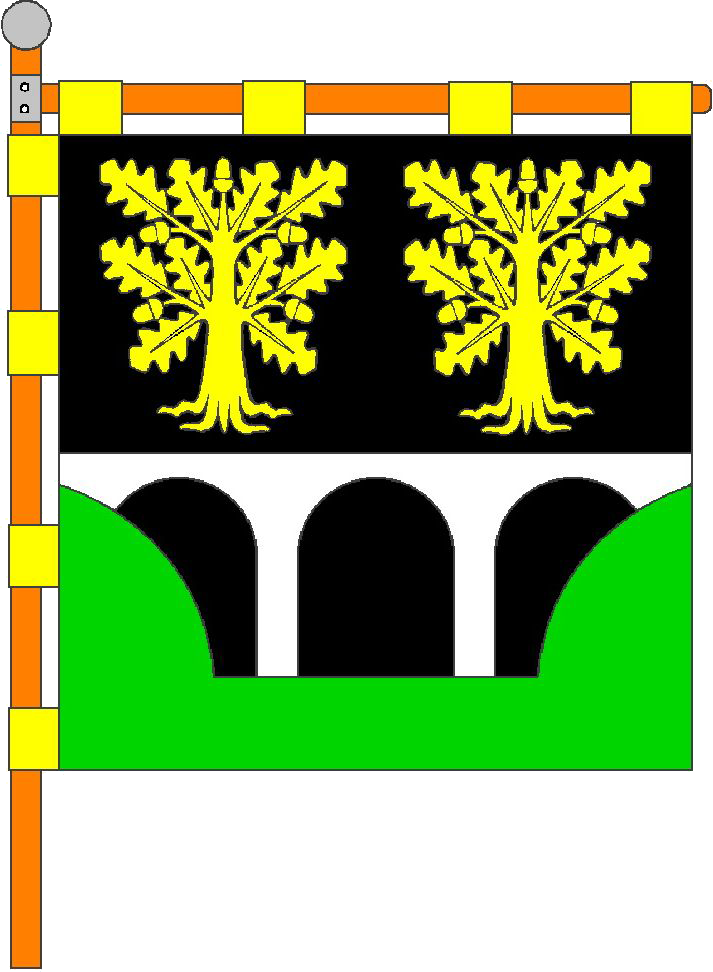
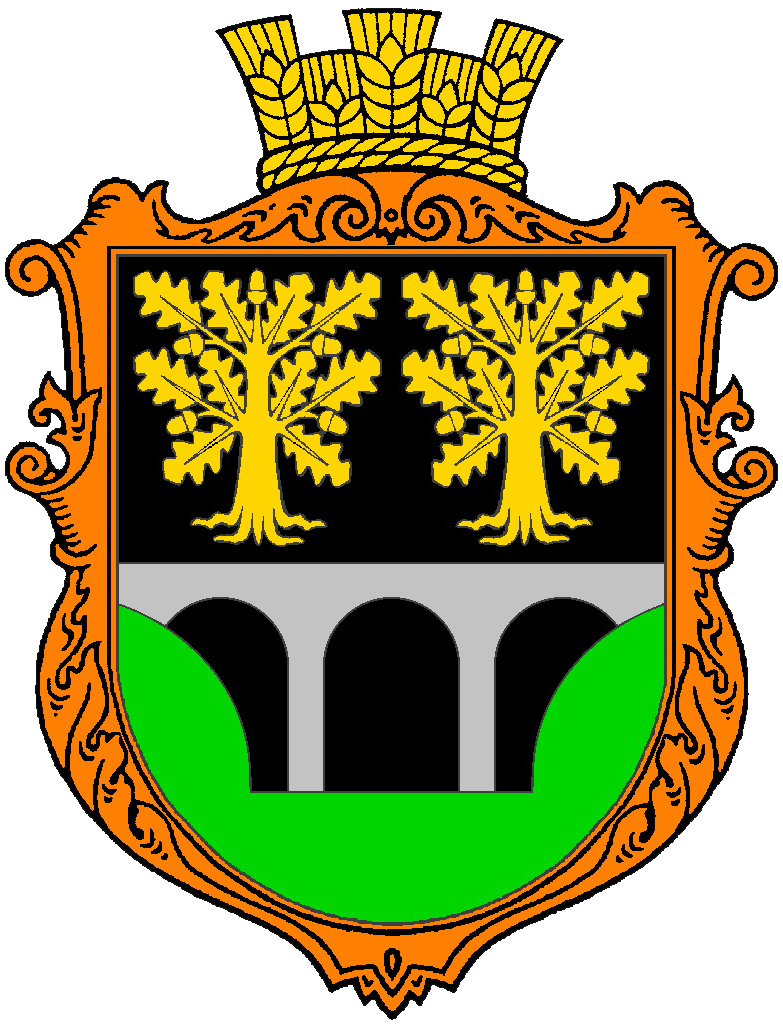
- Flag Coat of arms

- Location within Ternopil Oblast
- Coordinates: 49°2′32″N 25°48′54″E
- Country: Ukraine
- Oblast: Ternopil Oblast
- District: Chortkiv Raion
- Area: 2,424 km^{2} (936 sq mi)
- Elevation: 259 m (850 ft)
- Population: 758
  - Density: 312/km^{2} (810/sq mi)
- Website: село Переходи ^{(Ukrainian)}

Perekhody (Ukrainian: Перехо́ди) is a village located at the Seret River in Chortkiv Raion (district) of Ternopil Oblast (province in western Ukraine). It belongs to Chortkiv urban hromada, one of the hromadas of Ukraine. The village belongs to Horishnovyhnanska village council, which is located in the Horishnya Vyhnanka village. The population of the village is 758 people.

First mentioned in 1603 the village belonged to the Kamieniec (Kamyanets-Podilskyi) in the 16th century and was known as the part of the town Chortkiv. There is a Catholic chapel here of St. John Nepomucene.
