= Shumsk urban hromada =

Urban hromada in Ternopil Oblast, Ukraine

Shumsk urban hromada Шумська міська громада
- hromada
- Location within Ternopil Oblast Location within Ukraine
- Coordinates: 50°06′51″N 26°06′52″E
- Country: Ukraine
- Oblast: Ternopil Oblast
- Raion: Kremenets Raion
- Administrative center: Shumsk

Government
  - Hromada head: Vadym Boiarskyi

Area
  - Total: 499.5 km^{2} (192.9 sq mi)

Population (2022)
  - Total: 24,466
- City: 1
- Villages: 43
- Website: shumska-gromada.gov.ua

Shumsk urban territorial hromada (Ukrainian: Шумська територіальна громада, romanized: Shumska miska terytorialna hromada) is a hromada in Ukraine, in Kremenets Raion of Ternopil Oblast. The administrative center is the city of Shumsk. Its population is 24,466 (2022 estimate) It was formed on 24 July 2015.

== Settlements ==
The hromada consists of 1 city (Shumsk) and 43 villages:

- Andrushivka
- Antonivtsi
- Bashkivtsi
- Bykivtsi
- Birky
- Bolozhivka
- Brykiv
- Vaskivtsi
- Velyka Ilovytsia
- Viliia
- Zholobky
- Zabara
- Zalistsi
- Zaluzhzhia
- Konovytsia
- Kordyshiv
- Kruholets
- Kuty
- Kutianka
- Litovyshche
- Liudvyshche
- Mala Ilovytsia
- Mali Sadky
- Myrove
- Novosilka
- Novostav
- Obych
- Oderadivka
- Onyshkivtsi
- Peremorivka
- Potutoriv
- Rokhmaniv
- Ruska Huta
- Sosnivka
- Soshyshche
- Stizhok
- Surazh
- Tetylkivtsi
- Tyliavka
- Uhorsk
- Khodaky
- Tsetsenivka
- Shumbar
