= Shumsk Raion =

Former subdivision of Ternopil Oblast, Ukraine

Shumsk Raion Шумський район
- Raion
- Flag Coat of arms

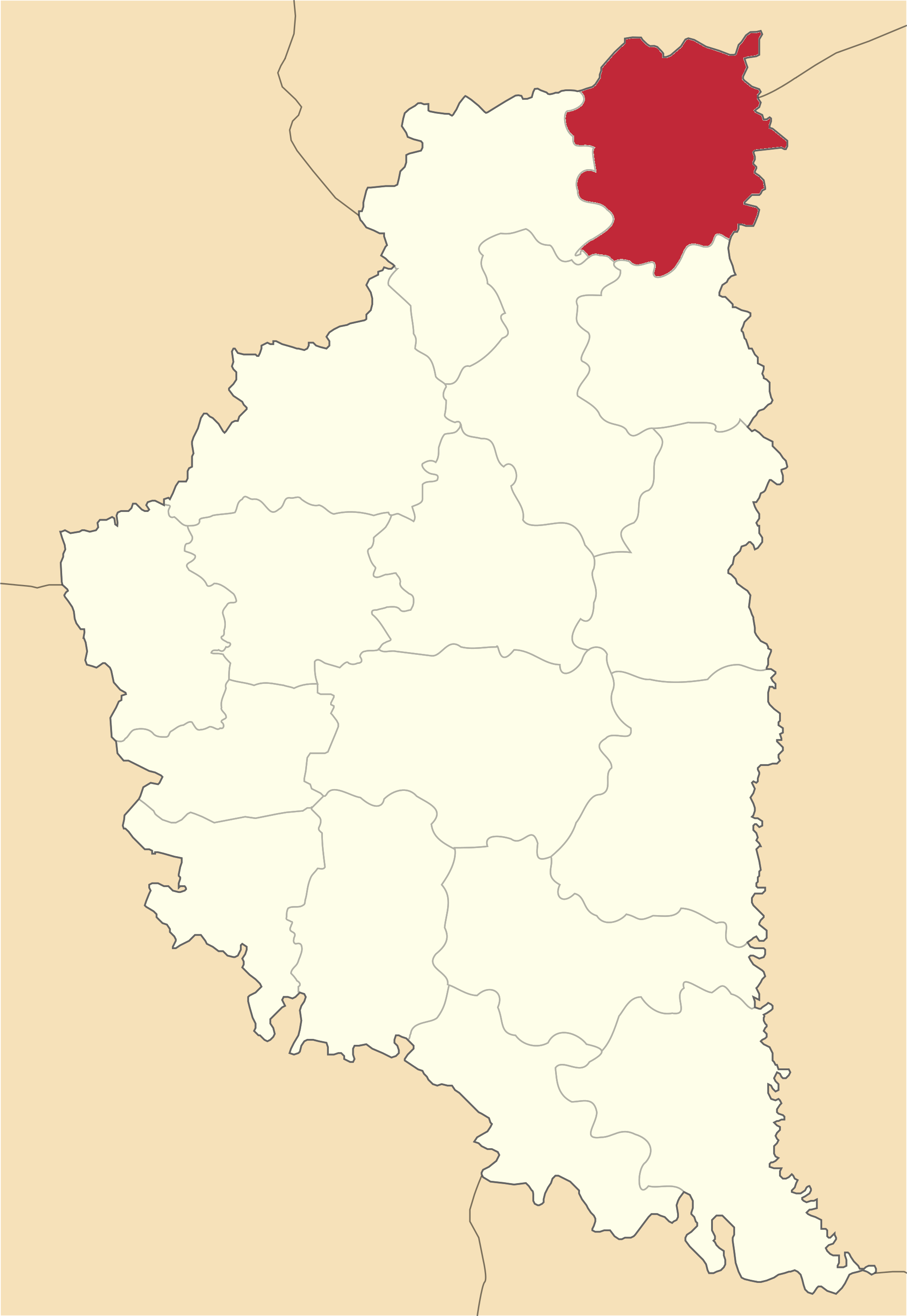
- Coordinates: 50°06′N 26°01′E
- Country: Ukraine
- Oblast: Ternopil Oblast
- Established: 1940
- Disestablished: 18 July 2020
- Admin. center: Shumsk

Area
  - Total: 0,838 km^{2} (324 sq mi)

Population (2020)
  - Total: 32,625
  - Density: 38.9/km^{2} (101/sq mi)
- Time zone: UTC+02:00 (EET)
  - Summer (DST): UTC+03:00 (EEST)
- Area code: 380-3558
- Website: http://www.shumsk.org.ua/ Shumsk Raion

Shumsk Raion (Ukrainian: Шумський район) was a former raion (district) in Ternopil Oblast in western Ukraine. Its administrative center was Shumsk. The raion was abolished on 18 July 2020 as part of the administrative reform of Ukraine, which reduced the number of raions of Ternopil Oblast to three. The area of Shumsk Raion was merged into Kremenets Raion. The last estimate of the raion population was 32,625 (2020 est.).

At the time of disestablishment, the raion consisted of two hromadas:

- Shumsk urban hromada with the administration in Shumsk;
- Velyki Dederkaly rural hromada with the administration in the selo of Velyki Dederkaly.

== See also ==
- Subdivisions of Ukraine
