= Kremenets Raion =

Subdivision of Ternopil Oblast, Ukraine

Kremenets Raion Кременецький район
- Raion
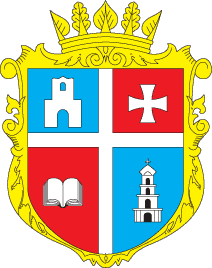
- Flag Coat of arms

- Interactive map of Kremenets Raion
- Coordinates: 50.08°N 25.75°E
- Country: Ukraine
- Oblast: Ternopil Oblast
- Established: 1939
- Admin. center: Kremenets
- Subdivisions: 8 hromadas

Area
  - Total: 2,650.7 km^{2} (1,023.4 sq mi)

Population (2022)
  - Total: 140,063
  - Density: 52.840/km^{2} (136.85/sq mi)
- Time zone: UTC+02:00 (EET)
  - Summer (DST): UTC+03:00 (EEST)
- Postal index: 47000
- Area code: 380-3546
- Website: rairada-kremenets.gov.ua

Kremenets Raion (Ukrainian: Кременецький район) is a raion (district) in Ternopil Oblast of western Ukraine. The administrative center is the city of Kremenets. Population: 140,063 (2022 estimate).

On 18 July 2020, as part of the administrative reform of Ukraine, the number of raions of Ternopil Oblast was reduced to three, and the area of Kremenets Raion was significantly expanded. Two abolished raions, Lanivtsi and Shumsk Raions, as well as a part of one more abolished raion, Zbarazh Raion, and the city of Kremenets, which was previously incorporated as a city of oblast significance and did not belong to the raion, were merged into Kremenets Raion. The January 2020 estimate of the raion population was 45,884 (2020 est.).

== Subdivisions ==
=== Current ===
After the reform in July 2020, the raion consisted of 8 hromadas:

- Borsuky rural hromada with the administration in the selo of Borsuky, transferred from Lanivtsi Raion;
- Kremenets urban hromada with the administration in the city of Kremenets, retained from Kremenets Raion and transferred from the city of oblast significance of Kremenets;
- Lanivtsi urban hromada with the administration in the city of Lanivtsi, transferred from Lanivtsi Raion;
- Lopushne rural hromada with the administration in the selo of Lopushne, retained from Kremenets Raion;
- Pochaiv urban hromada with the administration in the city of Pochaiv, retained from Kremenets Raion;
- Shumsk urban hromada with the administration in the city of Shumsk, transferred from Shumsk Raion;
- Velyki Dederkaly rural hromada with the administration in the selo of Velyki Dederkaly, transferred from Shumsk Raion;
- Vyshnivets settlement hromada with the administration in the rural settlement of Vyshnivets, transferred from Zbarazh Raion.

=== Before 2020 ===
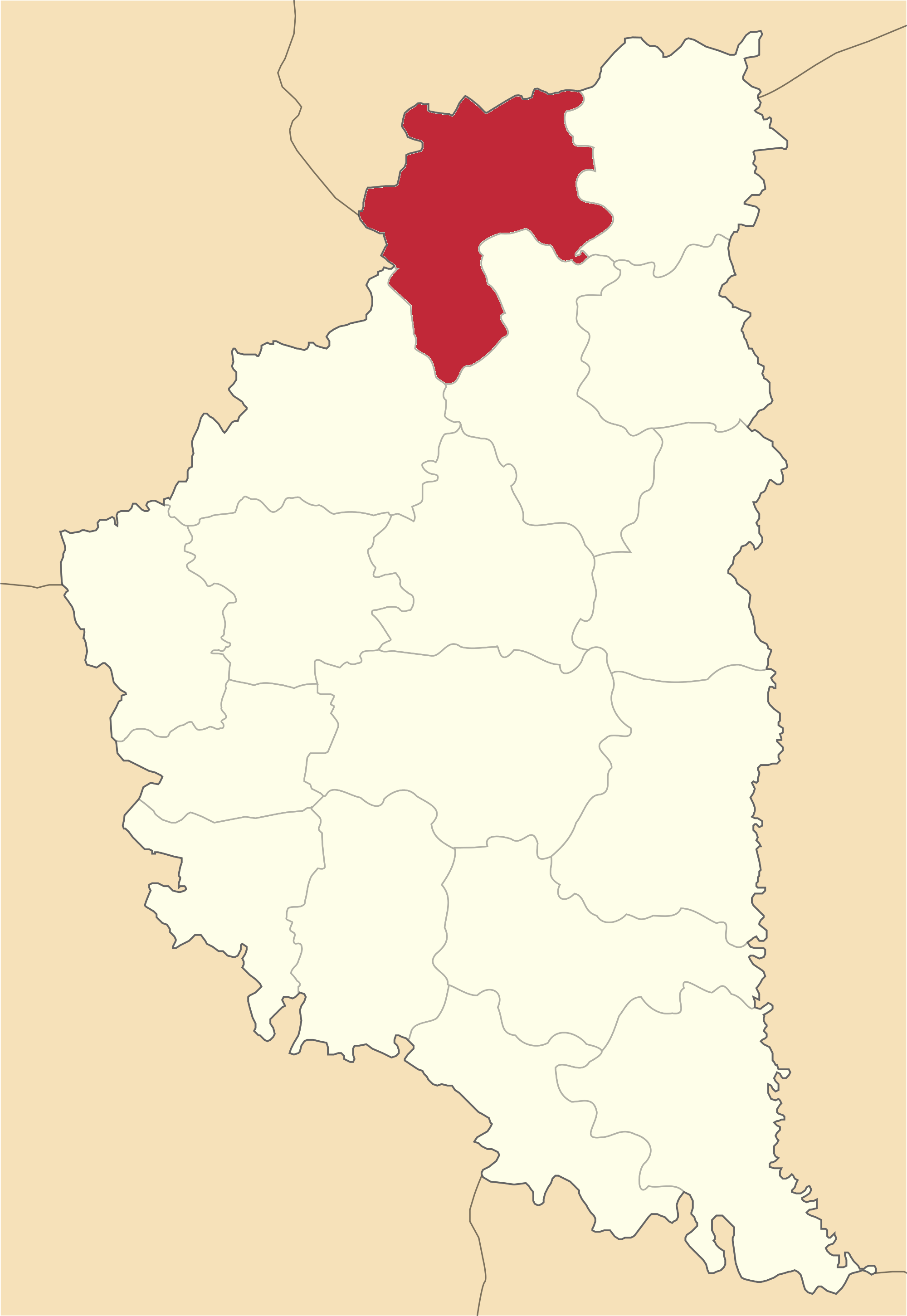
Kremenets Raion in Ternopil Oblast (1966-2020)

Before the 2020 reform, the raion consisted of three hromadas:

- Kremenets urban hromada with the administration in Kremenets, also included the city of Kremenets;
- Lopushne rural hromada with the administration in Lopushne;
- Pochaiv urban hromada with the administration in Pochaiv.

== History ==
The area was known as the Kremenets Uyezd when it was part of the Russian Empire. It was part of Volhynian Governorate.
