= Krasnopillia =

Krasnopillia (Ukrainian: Краснопілля) may refer to several populated places in Ukraine:

- Krasnopillia, Kramatorsk Raion, Donetsk Oblast, a village
- Krasnopillia, Mykolaiv Oblast, a village
- Krasnopillia, Sumy Oblast, an urban-type settlement
- a neighborhood (village) in the southern part of Dnipro city
