= Church of the Holy Trinity, Shliakhtyntsi =

Greek Catholic church in Shliakhtyntsi, Ukraine

Church of the Holy Trinity Церква Пресвятої Трійці
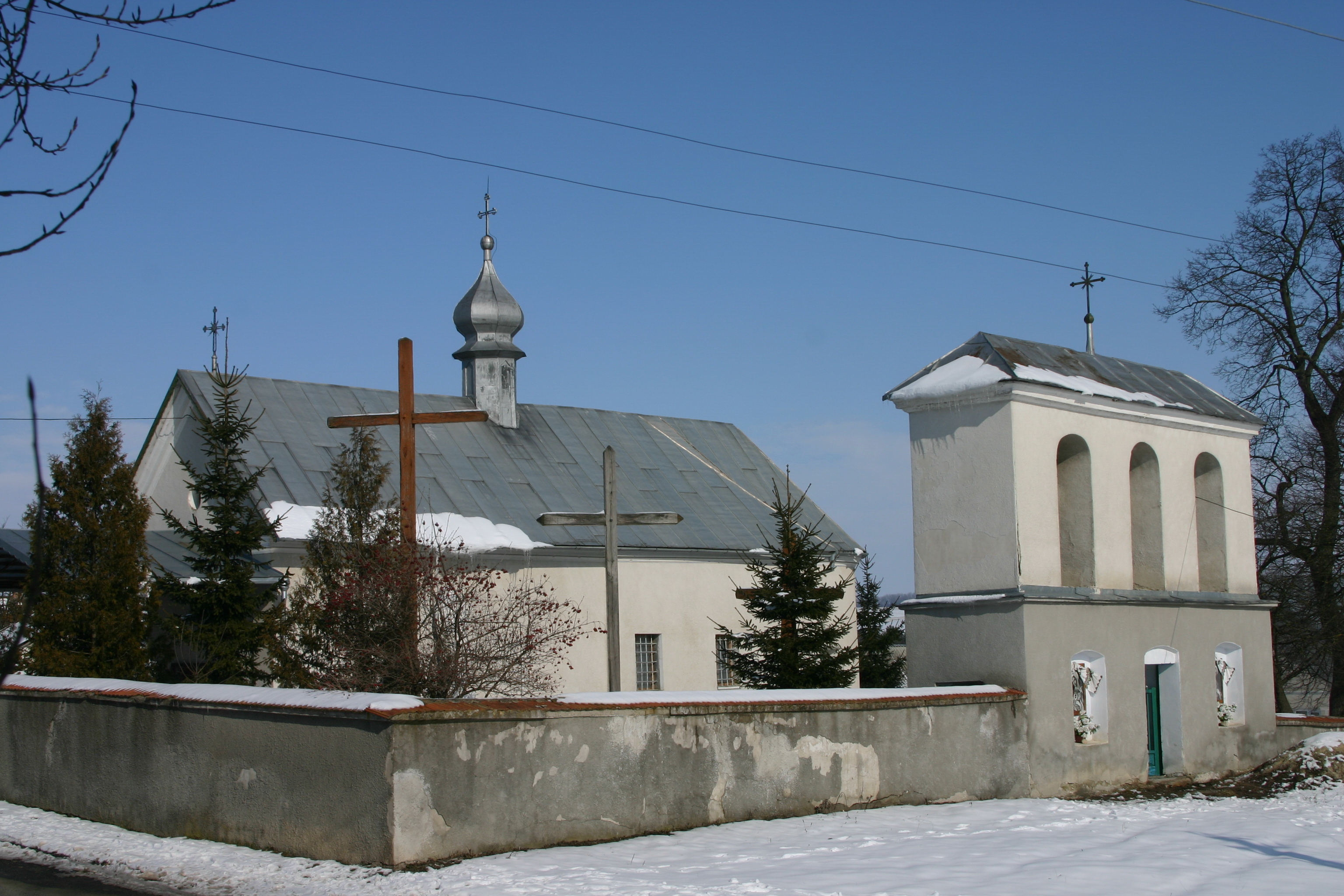

- Location within Ternopil Oblast

Religion
- Affiliation: Ukrainian Greek Catholic Church

Location
- Location: Shliakhtyntsi, Baikivtsi rural hromada, Ternopil Raion, Ternopil Oblast, Ukraine
- Interactive map of Church of the Holy Trinity; Церква Пресвятої Трійці
- Coordinates: 49°35′21.7″N 25°40′04.6″E

Architecture
- Completed: 1674

Church of the Holy Trinity (Ukrainian: Церква Пресвятої Трійці) is a Greek Catholic parish church (UGCC) in Shliakhtyntsi of the Baikivtsi rural hromada of the Ternopil Raion of the Ternopil Oblast, the church and bell tower are an architectural monument of loсal importance.

== History ==
The church was built in 1674. It was consecrated on the feast of the Holy Trinity. It is known from historical sources that Bohdan Khmelnytsky visited the church when a prayer service was held for the successful campaign of his army, which took place in Zbarazh. As a gift, Bohdan Khmelnytsky left the Holy Scriptures, which have not been preserved.

The parish and the church belonged to the UGCC until 1946, from 1947 to 1990 – to the Russian Orthodox Church, since 1990 – again in the bosom of the UGCC.

In June 2007, the renovated church was consecrated by Bishop Vasyl Semeniuk.

The parish is home to the Brotherhood of the Mother of God of Perpetual Help, the Sodality of Our Lady (since May 2004), the Mothers in Prayer community (since June 2004), and the Association of the Living Rosary (since March 2008).

The pride of the parish is the church choir under the direction of Stepan Matkovskyi. In 2008, the choir celebrated its 20th anniversary, and in 2010 it was awarded the title of folk amateur choir.

The community, with the active organizational work of the church committee members and at. Myron, a chapel in honor of the Blessed Virgin Mary was built in 2011.

== Priests ==
- at. Hryhorii Postryhachevskyi (there is only a mention that he died in 1759)
- at. Teodor Pasevych (1760–1808)
- at. Yakiv Zarudskyi (1808–1814)
- at. Petro Zarydskyi (1814–1820)
- at. Andrii Voronovych (1820–1831)
- at. Hryhorii Barvinskyi (1831–1880)
- at. Hryhorii Chubatyi (1880–1881)
- at. Severyn Navrotskyi (1881–1901)
- at. Antin Zarykhta (1901–1920)
- at. Yevhen Matseliukh (1920)
- at. Oleksandr Malytskyi (1921–1953)
- at. Omelian Drapinskyi (1959–1973)
- at. Lubomyr Melnyk (1973)
- at. Bohdan Mykhalchuk (1980)
- at. Mykhailo Pavko (1990–1999)
- at. Myron Sachyk (since 30 December 1999)
