= Shachko =

Shachko is a Ukrainian surname.

- Oksana Shachko
- Pavlo Shachko
