= Kurnyky, Ternopil Oblast =

Rural locality in Ternopil Oblast, Ukraine

Kurnyky Курники
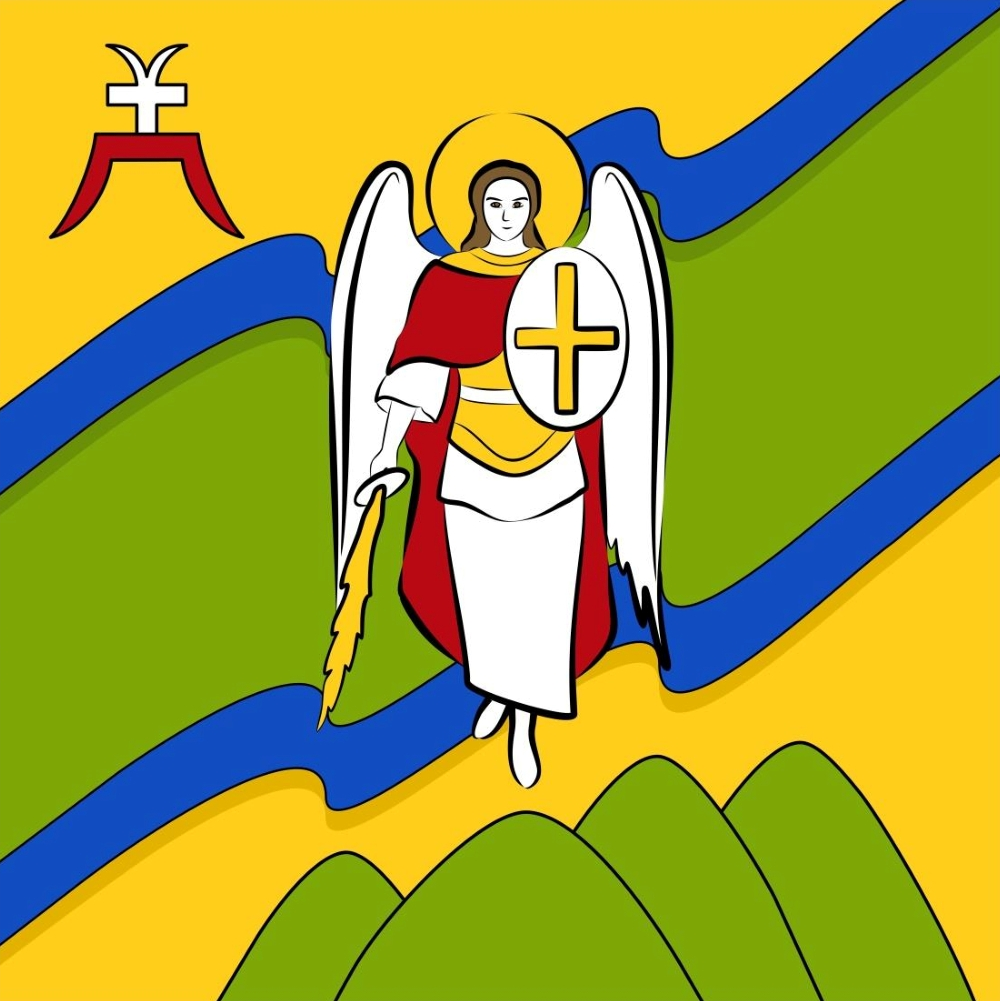
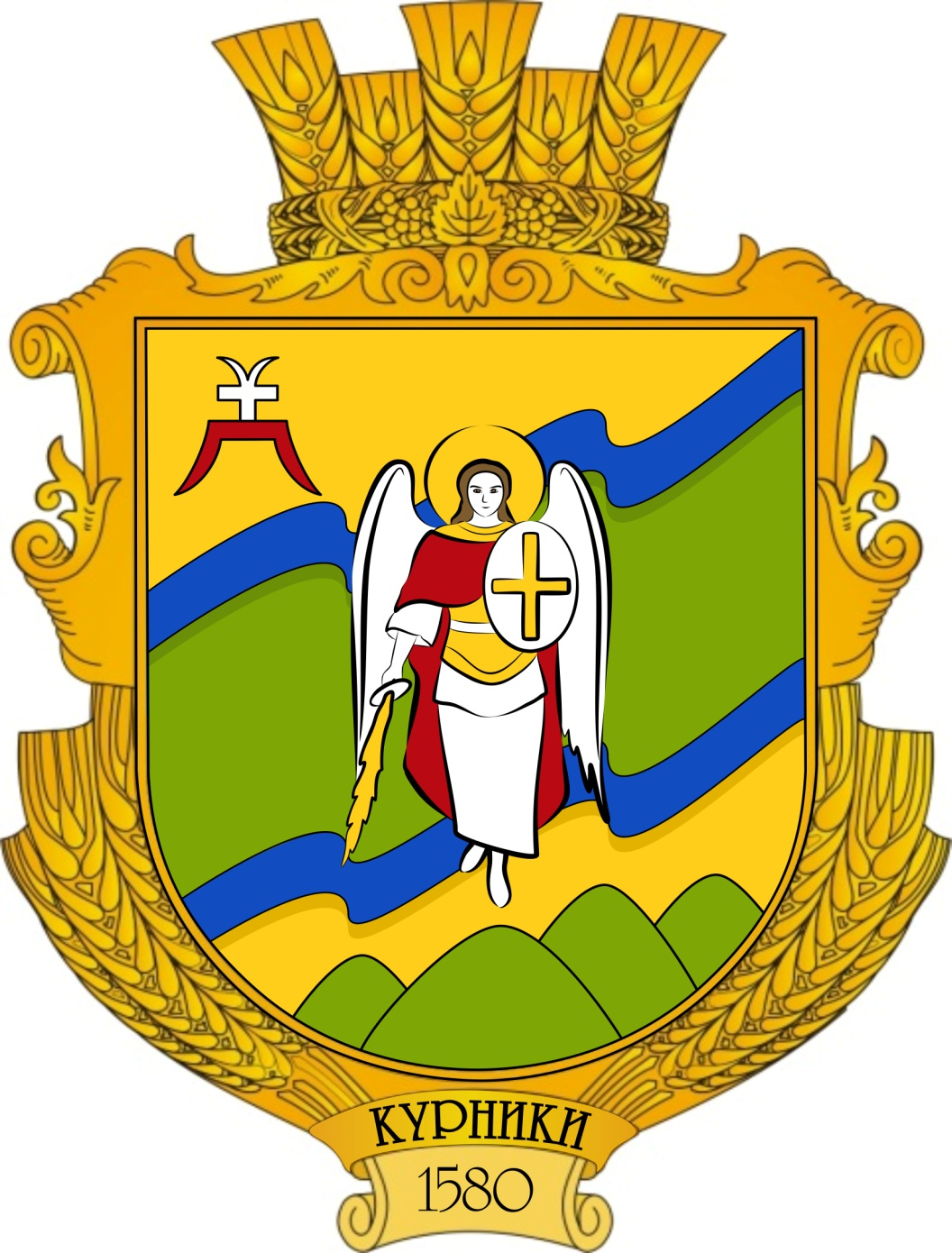
- Flag Coat of arms

- Location in Ternopil Oblast
- Coordinates: 49°37′28″N 25°39′24″E
- Country: Ukraine
- Oblast: Ternopil Oblast
- Raion: Ternopil Raion
- Hromada: Baikivtsi rural hromada
- Time zone: UTC+2 (EET)
  - Summer (DST): UTC+3 (EEST)
- Postal code: 47710

Kurnyky (Ukrainian: Курники) is a village in Baikivtsi rural hromada, Ternopil Raion, Ternopil Oblast, Ukraine.

== History ==
The first written mention of the village was in 1580.

== Religion ==
- St. Michael's church (UGCC, 1922, brick).

== Sources ==
- (in Ukrainian) О. Гаврилюк, В. Уніят., Курники // Ternopil Encyclopedic Dictionary: in 4 v. / editorial board: H. Yavorskyi and other, Ternopil: "Zbruch", 2005, V. 2: К—О, S. 292–293. — ISBN 966-528-199-2.
- "Kurniki". Geographical Dictionary of the Kingdom of Poland (in Polish). p. 199.
