= Hai-Hrechynski =

Rural locality in Ternopil Oblast, Ukraine

Hai-Hrechynski Гаї-Гречинські
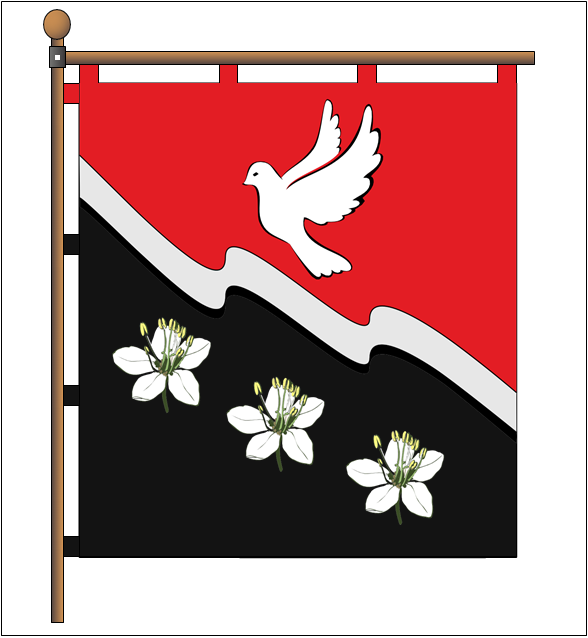
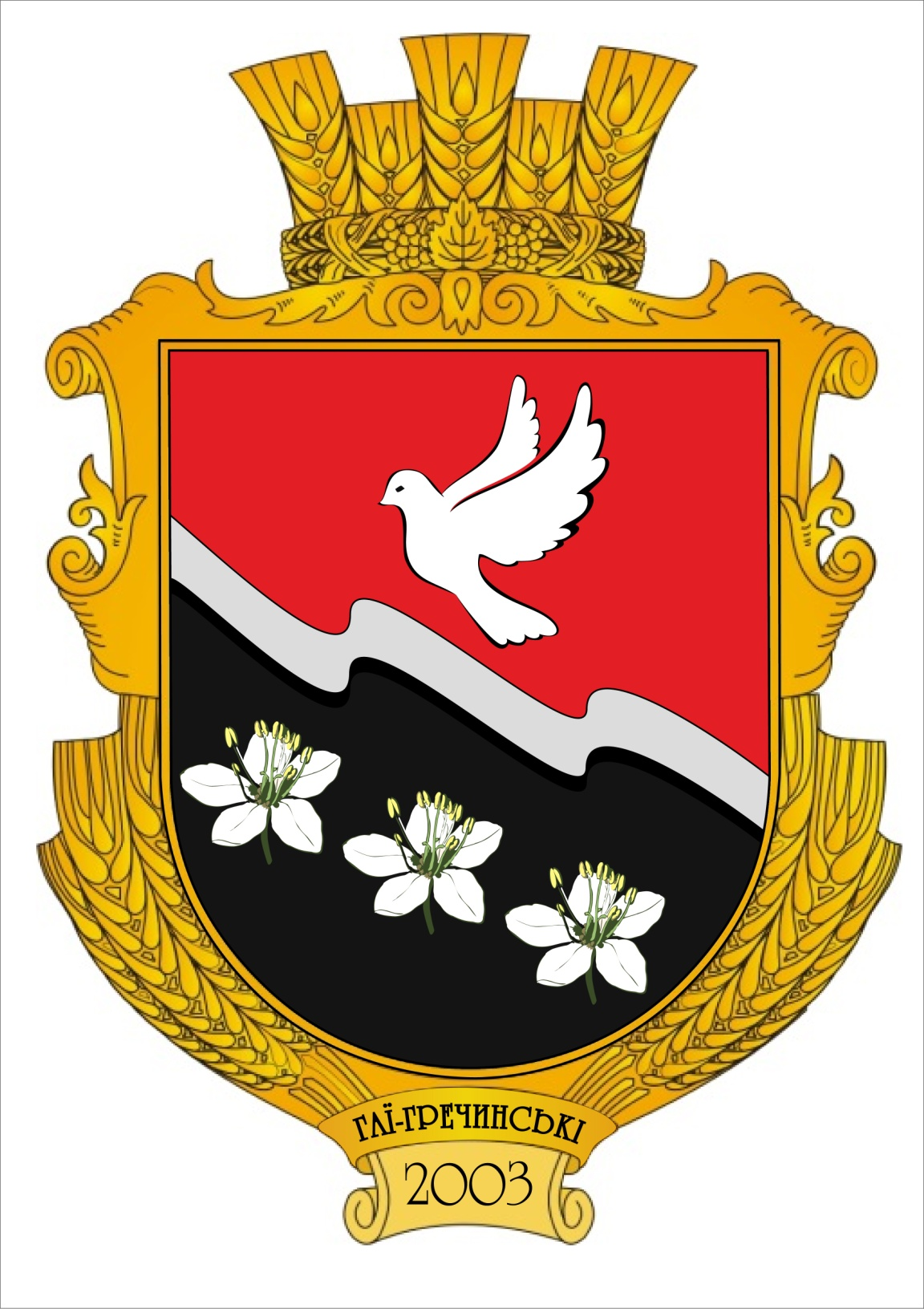
- Flag Coat of arms

- Location in Ternopil Oblast
- Coordinates: 49°34′33″N 25°39′19″E
- Country: Ukraine
- Oblast: Ternopil Oblast
- Raion: Ternopil Raion
- Hromada: Baikivtsi rural hromada
- Time zone: UTC+2 (EET)
  - Summer (DST): UTC+3 (EEST)
- Postal code: 47710

Hai-Hrechynski (Ukrainian: Гаї-Гречинські) is a village in Baikivtsi rural hromada, Ternopil Raion, Ternopil Oblast, Ukraine.

== History ==
The khutir Hai-Hrechynski has been known from the late 19th century.

The status of a village was granted according to the Resolution of the Verkhovna Rada of Ukraine of 9 July 2003. Hai Hrechynski was registered as a village according to the decision of the Ternopil Oblast Council of 12 September 2003.

== Religion ==
- Church of the Immaculate Conception of the Blessed Virgin Mary (UGCC, 2008, brick),
- Holy Spirit church (2016).

== Sources ==
- (in Ukrainian) Ониськів М., Уніят В., Гаї-Гречинські // Ternopil Encyclopedic Dictionary: in 4 v. / editorial board: H. Yavorskyi and other, Ternopil: "Zbruch", 2004, V. 1: А—Й, S. 321. — ISBN 966-528-197-6.
