= Anhelivka, Ternopil Raion, Ternopil Oblast =

Rural locality in Ternopil Oblast, Ukraine

Anhelivka Ангелівка
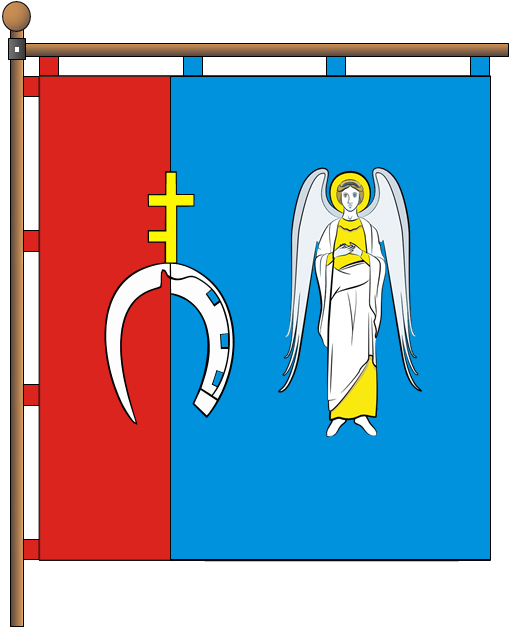
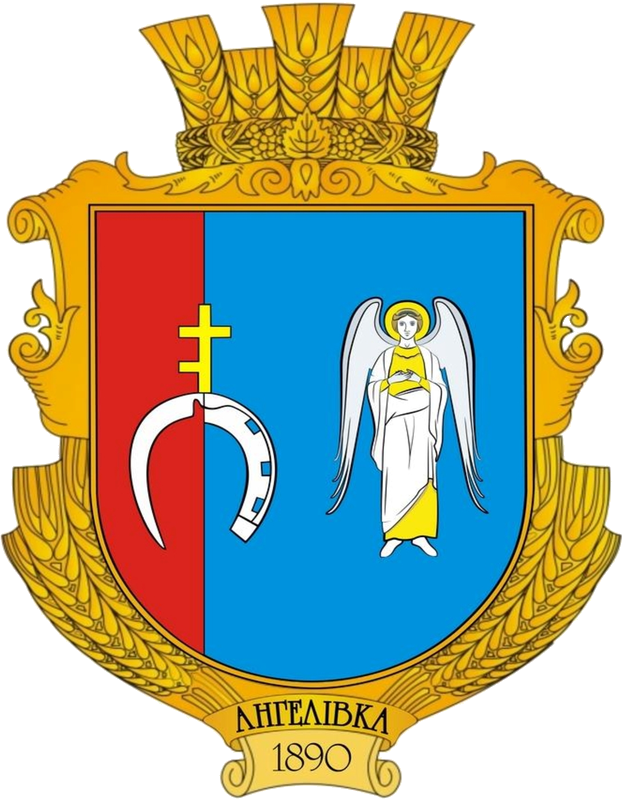
- Flag Coat of arms

- Location in Ternopil Oblast
- Coordinates: 49°32′58″N 25°49′30″E
- Country: Ukraine
- Oblast: Ternopil Oblast
- Raion: Ternopil Raion
- Hromada: Baikivtsi rural hromada
- Time zone: UTC+2 (EET)
  - Summer (DST): UTC+3 (EEST)
- Postal code: 47715

Anhelivka (Ukrainian: Ангелівка; in 1985–1991, Piharieve) is a village in Baikivtsi rural hromada, Ternopil Raion, Ternopil Oblast, Ukraine.

== History ==
It has been known from the late 18th century.

== Religion ==
- Church of the Intercession (1994, brick; consecrated in 2004, UGCC).

== Sources ==
- (in Ukrainian) Уніят В., Ангелівка // Ternopil Encyclopedic Dictionary: in 4 v. / editorial board: H. Yavorskyi and other, Ternopil: "Zbruch", 2004, V. 1: А—Й, S. 36. — ISBN 966-528-197-6.
