= Okhrymivtsi =

Rural locality in Ternopil Oblast, Ukraine

Okhrymivtsi Охримівці
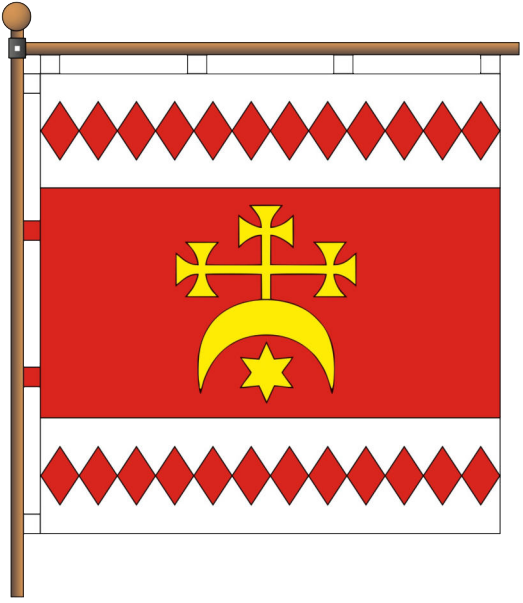
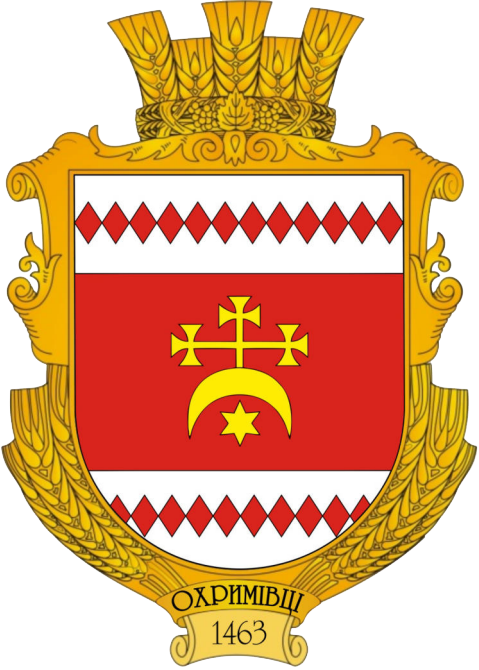
- Flag Coat of arms

- Location in Ternopil Oblast
- Coordinates: 49°35′23″N 25°45′9″E
- Country: Ukraine
- Oblast: Ternopil Oblast
- Raion: Ternopil Raion
- Hromada: Baikivtsi rural hromada
- Time zone: UTC+2 (EET)
  - Summer (DST): UTC+3 (EEST)
- Postal code: 47370

Okhrymivtsi (Ukrainian: Охримівці) is a village in Baikivtsi rural hromada, Ternopil Raion, Ternopil Oblast, Ukraine.

== History ==
The first written mention of the village was in 1463.

== Religion ==
- Saint Nicholas church (1893, brick, UGCC),
- the defunct Saint Sophia church (1919, RCC).

== Sources ==
- (in Ukrainian) Карпович В., Ковальков Ю., Охримівці // Ternopil Encyclopedic Dictionary: in 4 v. / editorial board: H. Yavorskyi and other, Ternopil: "Zbruch", 2005, V. 2: К—О, S. 702. — ISBN 966-528-199-2.
- "Ochrymowce". Geographical Dictionary of the Kingdom of Poland (in Polish). 7. Warszawa: Kasa im. Józefa Mianowskiego. 1886. p. 368.
