= Krasnopillia, Mykolaiv Oblast =

Rural locality in Mykolaiv Oblast, Ukraine

Krasnopillia Краснопілля
- Village
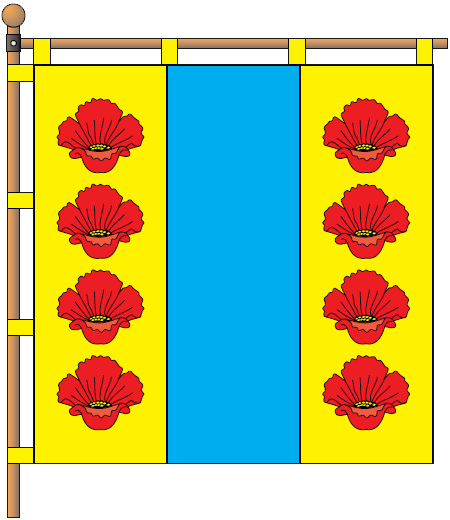
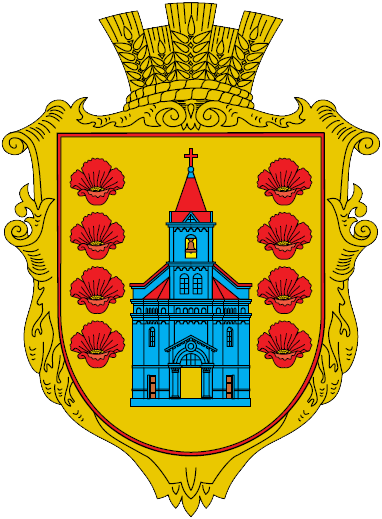
- Flag Coat of arms

- Location of Krasnopillia within Mykolaiv Oblast#Location of Krasnopillia within Ukraine Krasnopillia (Ukraine)
- Coordinates: 46°51′49″N 31°14′49″E
- Country: Ukraine
- Oblast: Mykolaiv Oblast
- District: Mykolaiv Raion
- Founded: 1862
- Elevation: 36 m (118 ft)

Population (2001)
  - Total: 1,083
- Time zone: UTC+2 (EET)
  - Summer (DST): UTC+3 (EEST)
- Postal code: 57434
- Area code: +380 5153

Krasnopillia (Ukrainian: Краснопілля) is a village in Mykolaiv Raion (district) in Mykolaiv Oblast of southern Ukraine.

Until 18 July 2020, Komisarivka was located in Berezanka Raion. The raion was abolished in July 2020 as part of the administrative reform of Ukraine, which reduced the number of raions of Mykolaiv Oblast to four. The area of Berezanka Raion was merged into Mykolaiv Raion.

The Ukrainian graphic artist and master of decorative art Mykola Dmitrukh (born 1954) was born in the village.
