= Hai-Shevchenkivski =

Rural locality in Ternopil Oblast, Ukraine

Hai-Shevchenkivski Гаї-Шевченківські
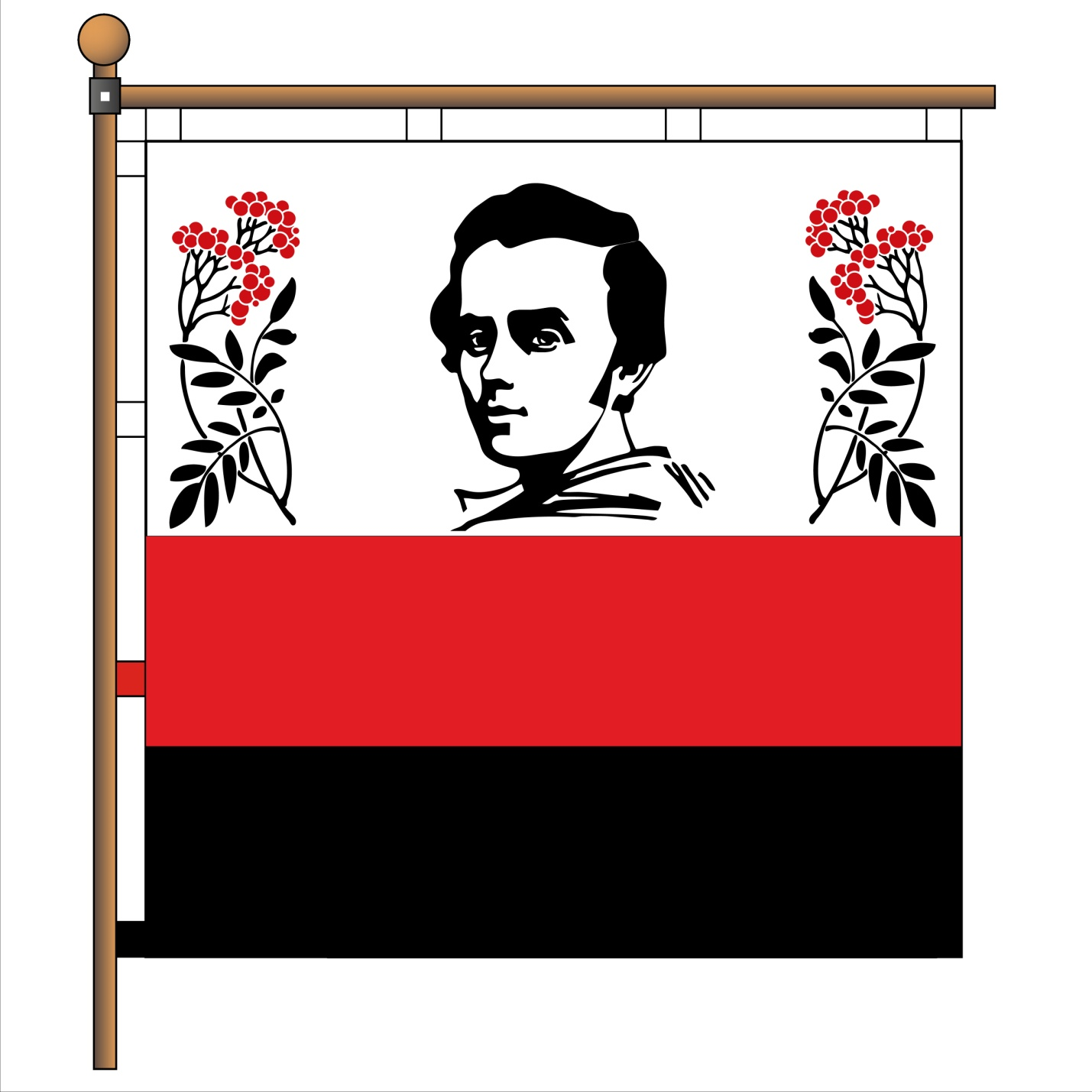
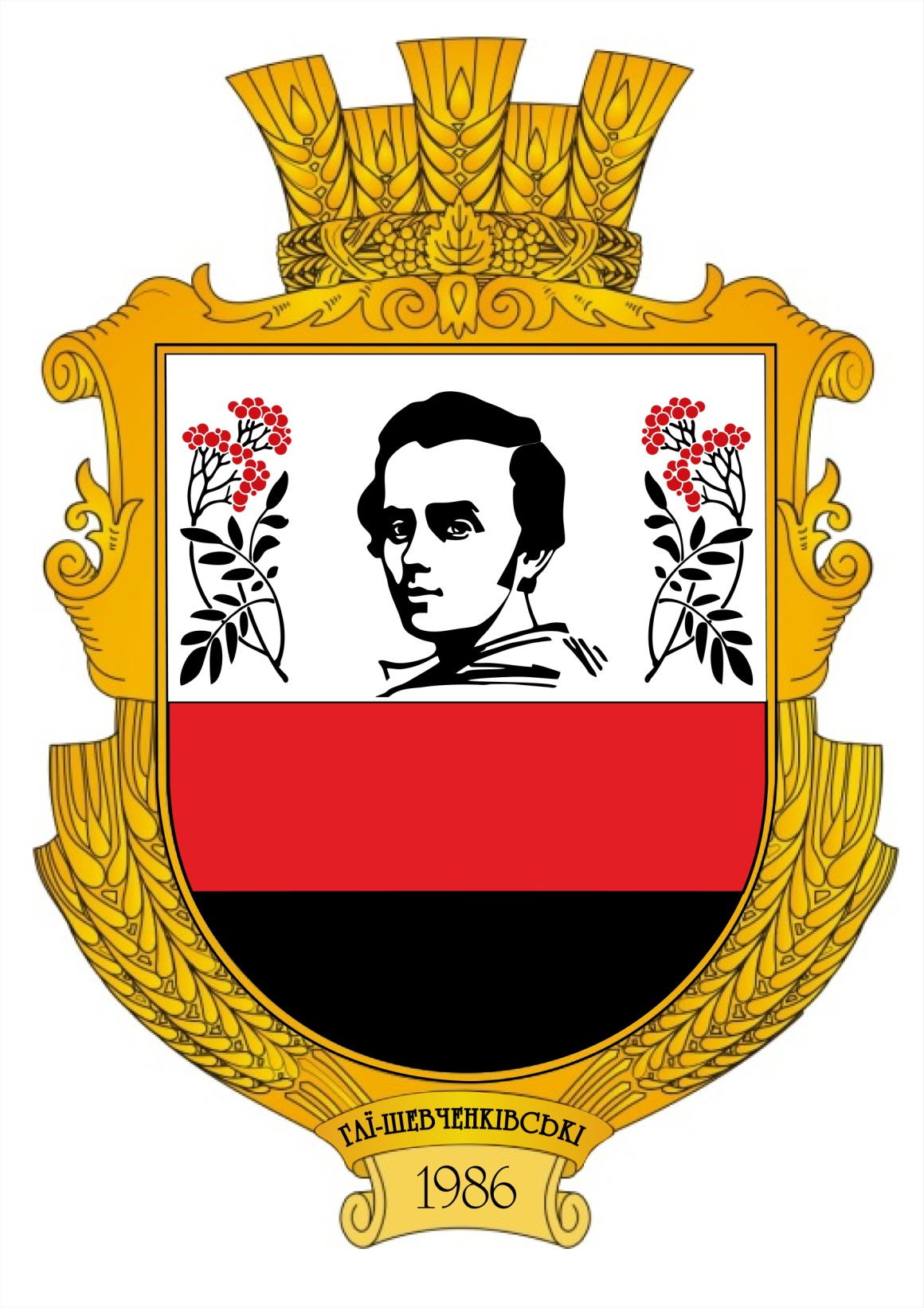
- Flag Coat of arms

- Location in Ternopil Oblast
- Coordinates: 49°36′5″N 25°37′48″E
- Country: Ukraine
- Oblast: Ternopil Oblast
- Raion: Ternopil Raion
- Hromada: Baikivtsi rural hromada
- Time zone: UTC+2 (EET)
  - Summer (DST): UTC+3 (EEST)
- Postal code: 47716

Hai-Shevchenkivski (Ukrainian: Гаї-Шевченківські) is a village in Baikivtsi rural hromada, Ternopil Raion, Ternopil Oblast, Ukraine.

== History ==
It has been known from 1863 as the Hai Shliakhtynetski.

Until 1990 it was a khutir that belonged to the Shliakhtyntsi rural council.

== Religion ==
- Two churches of the Assumption (2008, UGCC; 2016, OCU).

== Notable residents ==
- Pavlo Shachko (born 2002), Ukrainian painter, iconographer

== Sources ==
- (in Ukrainian) Лютинець С., Уніят В., Гаї-Шевченківські // Ternopil Encyclopedic Dictionary: in 4 v. / editorial board: H. Yavorskyi and other, Ternopil: "Zbruch", 2004, V. 1: А—Й, S. 321. — ISBN 966-528-197-6.
