= Stupky, Ternopil Oblast =

Rural locality in Ternopil Oblast, Ukraine

Stupky Ступки
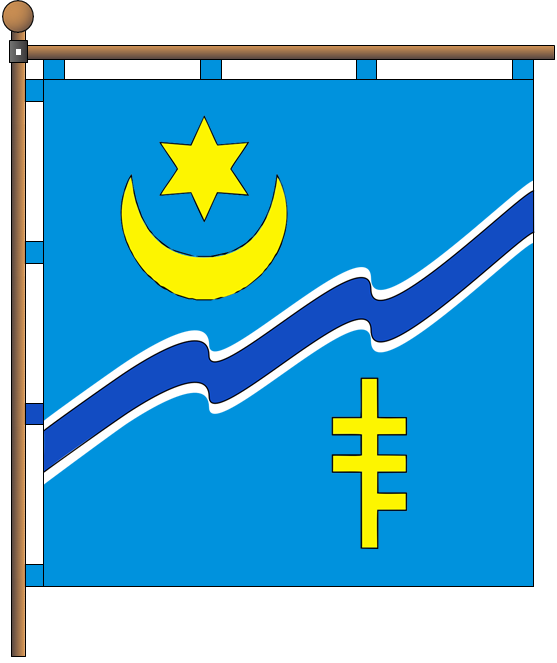
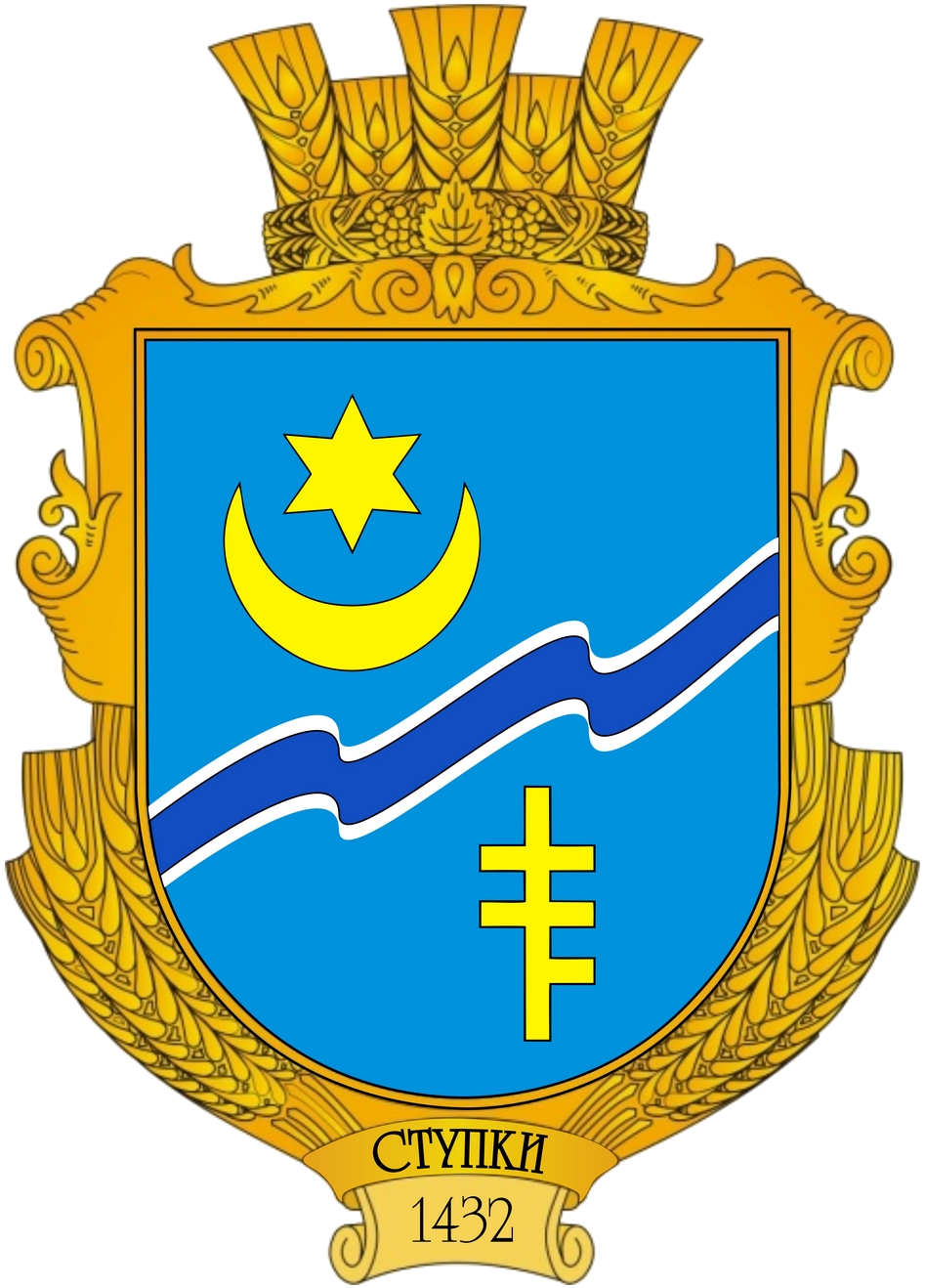
- Flag Coat of arms

- Location in Ternopil Oblast
- Coordinates: 49°32′17″N 25°45′10″E
- Country: Ukraine
- Oblast: Ternopil Oblast
- Raion: Ternopil Raion
- Hromada: Baikivtsi rural hromada
- Time zone: UTC+2 (EET)
  - Summer (DST): UTC+3 (EEST)
- Postal code: 47710

Stupky (Ukrainian: Ступки) is a village in Baikivtsi rural hromada, Ternopil Raion, Ternopil Oblast, Ukraine.

== History ==
The first written mention of the village was in 1432.

== Religion ==
- Church of the Nativity of the Blessed Virgin Mary (1899, brick).

== Sources ==
- (in Ukrainian) Куць П. Уніят В., Ступки // Ternopil Encyclopedic Dictionary: in 4 v. / editorial board: H. Yavorskyi and other, Ternopil: "Zbruch", 2008, V. 3: П—Я, S. 368–369. — ISBN 978-966-528-279-2.
- "Stupki". Geographical Dictionary of the Kingdom of Poland (in Polish). 11. Warszawa: Kasa im. Józefa Mianowskiego. 1890. p. 510.
