= Romanove Selo =

Rural locality in Ternopil Oblast, Ukraine

Romanove Selo Романове Село
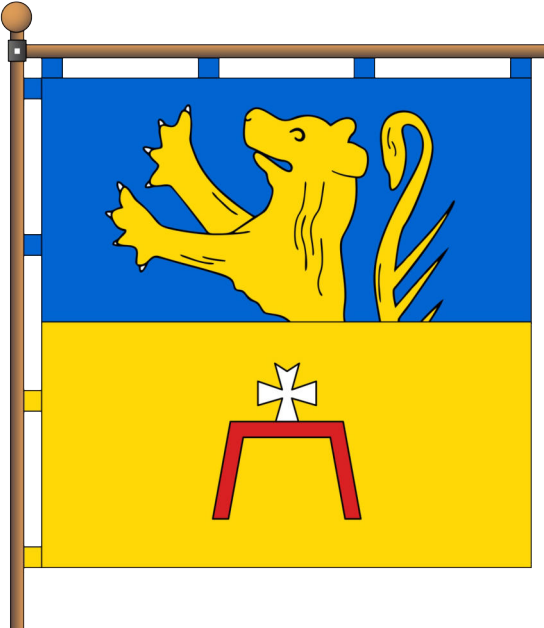
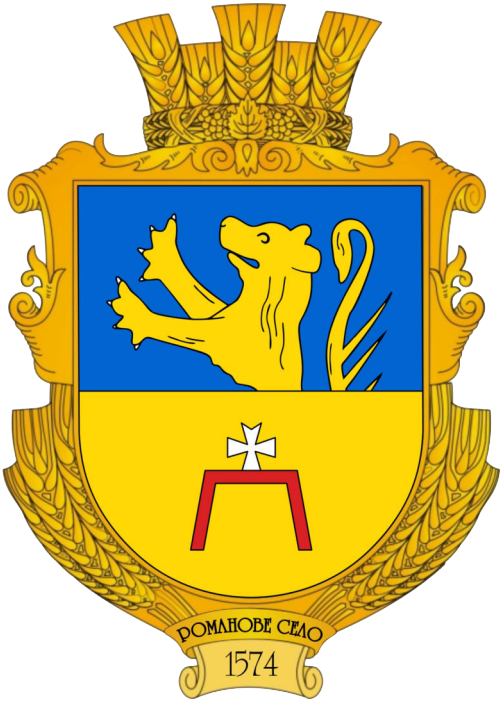
- Flag Coat of arms

- Location in Ternopil Oblast
- Coordinates: 49°32′58″N 25°53′8″E
- Country: Ukraine
- Oblast: Ternopil Oblast
- Raion: Ternopil Raion
- Hromada: Baikivtsi rural hromada
- Time zone: UTC+2 (EET)
  - Summer (DST): UTC+3 (EEST)
- Postal code: 47375

Romanove Selo (Ukrainian: Романове Село) is a village in Baikivtsi rural hromada, Ternopil Raion, Ternopil Oblast, Ukraine.

== History ==
The first written mention of the village was in 1574.

== Religion ==
- Church of the Intercession (1927, brick, restored in 1991),
- Church of the Ascension (1996, brick),
- remains of the Roman Catholic church (1931).

== Sources ==
- (in Ukrainian) Гуцал П., Уніят В., Романове Село // Ternopil Encyclopedic Dictionary: in 4 v. / editorial board: H. Yavorskyi and other, Ternopil: "Zbruch", 2008, V. 3: П—Я, S. 193. — ISBN 978-966-528-279-2.
- "Romanowe sioło". Geographical Dictionary of the Kingdom of Poland (in Polish). 9. Warszawa: Kasa im. Józefa Mianowskiego. 1888. p. 723.
