= Soborne, Ternopil Oblast =

Rural locality in Ternopil Oblast, Ukraine

Soborne Соборне
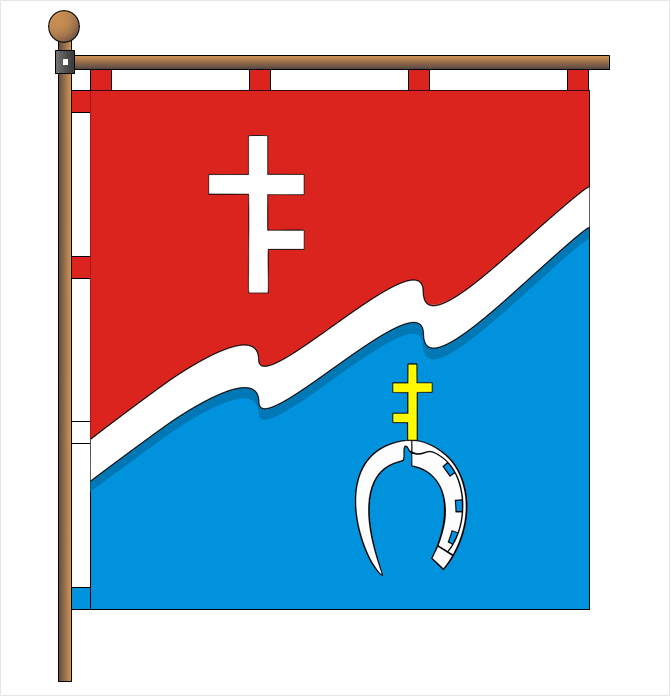
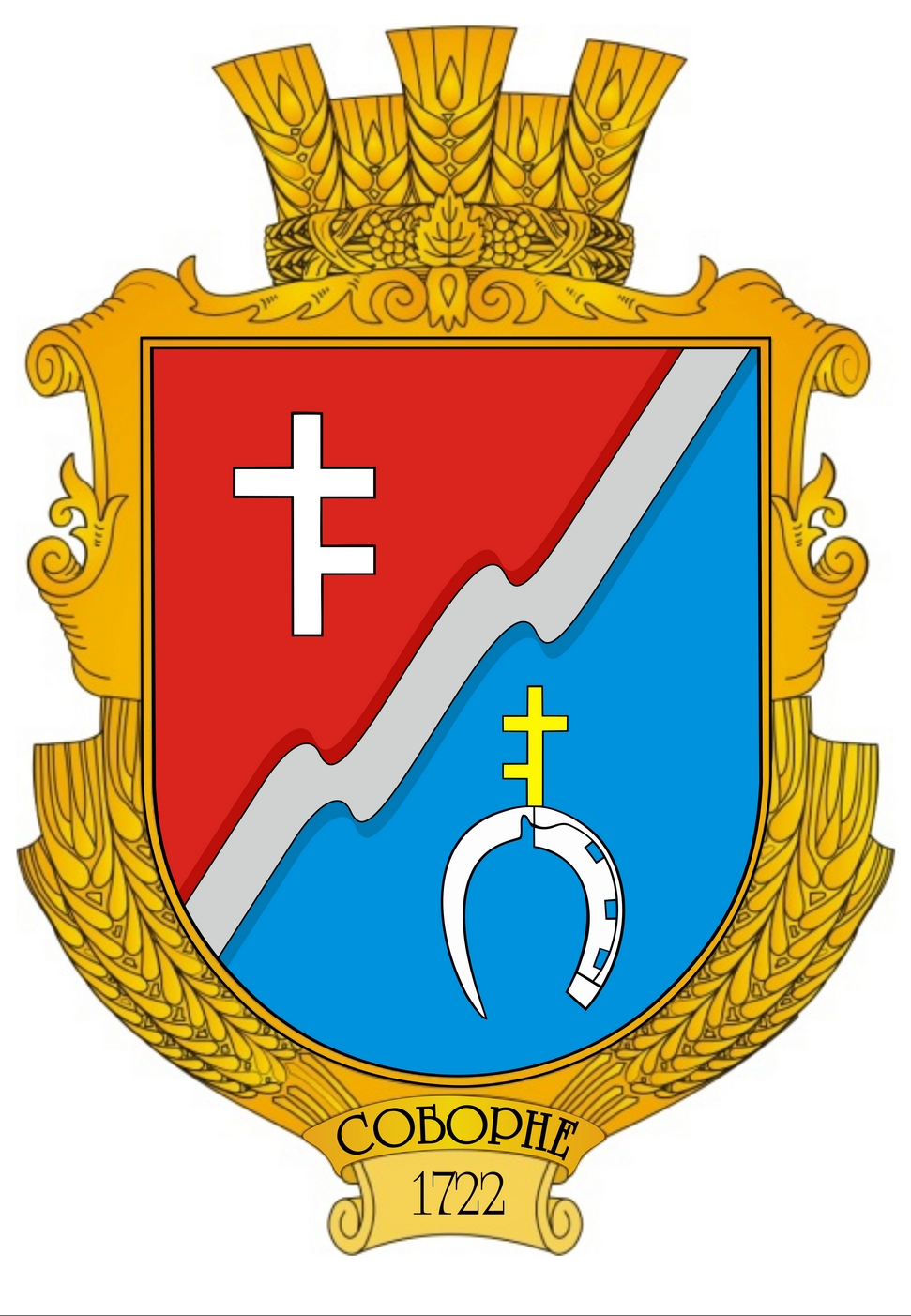
- Flag Coat of arms

- Location in Ternopil Oblast
- Coordinates: 49°33′38″N 25°46′2″E
- Country: Ukraine
- Oblast: Ternopil Oblast
- Raion: Ternopil Raion
- Hromada: Baikivtsi rural hromada
- Time zone: UTC+2 (EET)
  - Summer (DST): UTC+3 (EEST)
- Postal code: 47713

Soborne (Ukrainian: Соборне) is a village in Baikivtsi rural hromada, Ternopil Raion, Ternopil Oblast, Ukraine.

== History ==
Known from the late 17th century.

Names: Cherneliv-Mazovetskyi (until 1946), Zhukove (1946–1957), Zhovtneve (1957–2016), from 2016 – Soborne.

== Religion ==
- Holy Trinity church (UGCC, 1818, rebuilt in 1990 from a Roman Catholic church).

== Bibliography ==
- (in Ukrainian) Куречка І., Уніят В., Жовтневе // Ternopil Encyclopedic Dictionary: in 4 v. / editorial board: H. Yavorskyi and other, Ternopil: "Zbruch", 2004, V. 1: А—Й, S. 579. — ISBN 966-528-197-6.
- "Czernielów Mazowiecki". Geographical Dictionary of the Kingdom of Poland (in Polish). 1. Warszawa: Kasa im. Józefa Mianowskiego. 1880. p. 825.
