= Romanivka, Baikivtsi rural hromada, Ternopil Raion, Ternopil Oblast =

Rural locality in Ternopil Oblast, Ukraine

Romanivka Романівка
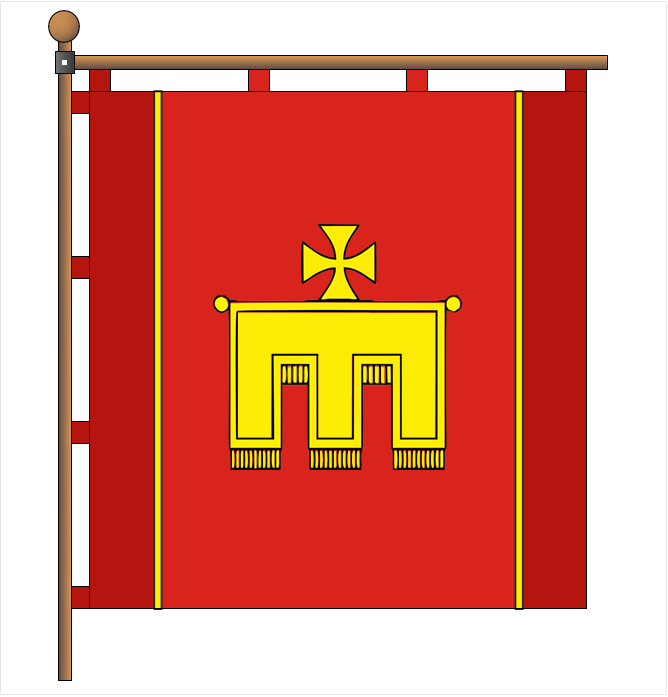
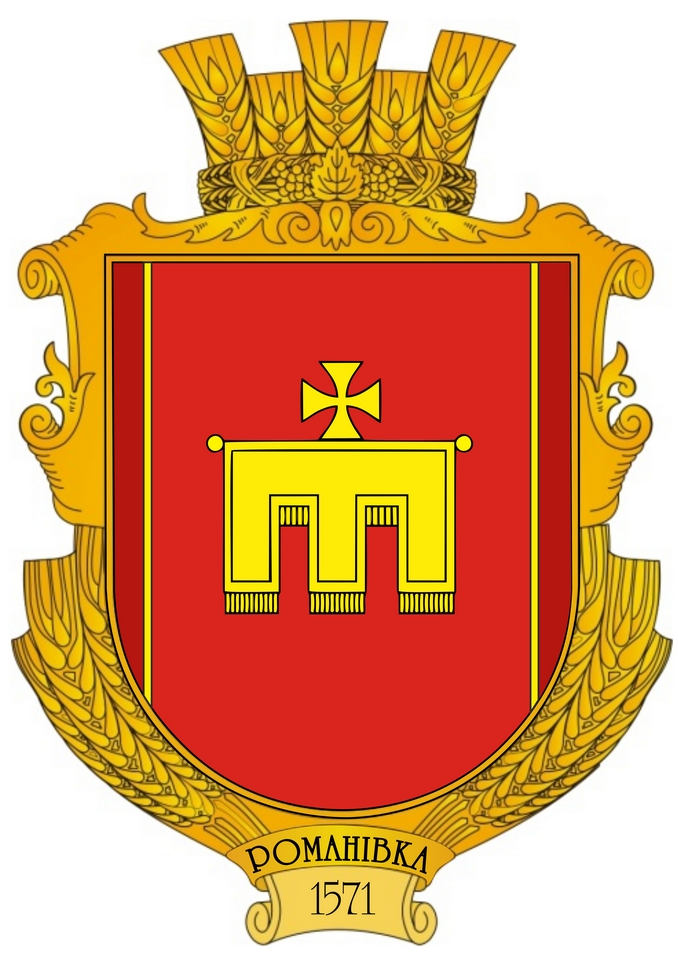
- Flag Coat of arms

- Location in Ternopil Oblast
- Coordinates: 49°32′0″N 25°49′0″E
- Country: Ukraine
- Oblast: Ternopil Oblast
- Raion: Ternopil Raion
- Hromada: Baikivtsi rural hromada
- Time zone: UTC+2 (EET)
  - Summer (DST): UTC+3 (EEST)
- Postal code: 47715

Romanivka (Ukrainian: Романівка) is a village in Baikivtsi rural hromada, Ternopil Raion, Ternopil Oblast, Ukraine.

== History ==
The first written mention of the village was in 1571.

== Religion ==
- Saint Nicholas church (1929).

== Sources ==
- (in Ukrainian) Мельничук В., Уніят В., Романівка // Ternopil Encyclopedic Dictionary: in 4 v. / editorial board: H. Yavorskyi and other, Ternopil: "Zbruch", 2008, V. 3: П—Я, S. 193. — ISBN 978-966-528-279-2.
- "Romanówka (1)". Geographical Dictionary of the Kingdom of Poland (in Polish). 9. Warszawa: Kasa im. Józefa Mianowskiego. 1888. p. 729–730.
