= Berezanka =

Rural locality in Mykolaiv Oblast, Ukraine

Berezanka Березанка
- Rural settlement
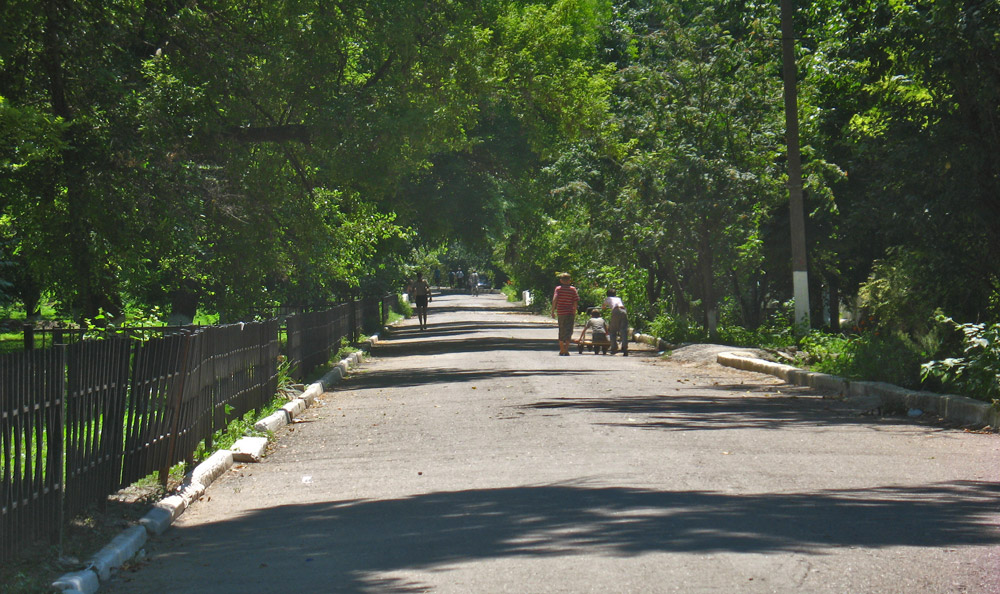

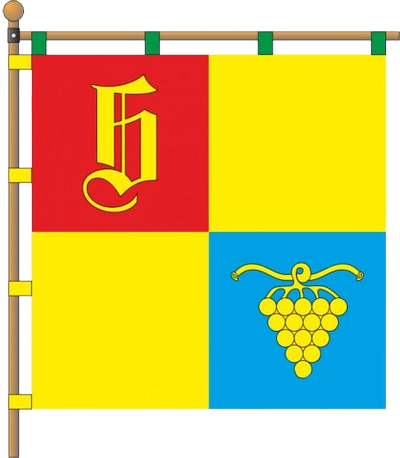
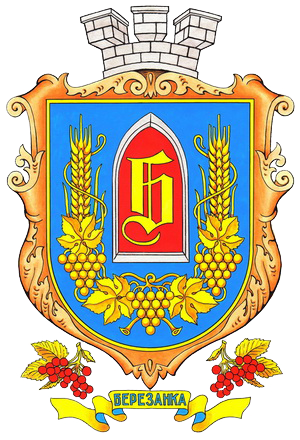
- Flag Coat of arms

- Location of Berezanka Berezanka (Mykolaiv Oblast)
- Coordinates: 46°51′18″N 31°23′15″E
- Country: Ukraine
- Oblast: Mykolaiv Oblast
- Raion: Mykolaiv Raion

Population (2022)
  - Total: 4,000
- Time zone: UTC+2 (EET)
  - Summer (DST): UTC+3 (EEST)

Berezanka (Ukrainian: Березанка, Russian: Береза́нка) is a Rural settlement in Mykolaiv Raion in the south of Mykolaiv Oblast, Ukraine. It hosts the administration of Berezanka settlement hromada, one of the hromadas of Ukraine. Population: 4,000 (2022 estimate).

Berezanka is located on the banks of the Sasik, a tributary of the Black Sea.

== History ==
The settlement was founded in 1866 by German settlers as Alexanderfeld. It belonged to Odessky Uyezd of Kherson Governorate and was the administrative center of Aleksandrfeldskaya Volost. In 1914, after the start of World War I, it was renamed Suvorovo, to commemorate Alexander Suvorov, in a wave of eliminating German names. On 16 April 1920, Odesa Governorate split off, and Odessky Uyezd was moved to Odesa Governorate. In 1923, uyezds in Ukrainian Soviet Socialist Republic were abolished, and the governorates were divided into okruhas. In 1923, Suvorovo was renamed Tylihulo-Berezanka, and in 1966 Berezanka.

In 1923, Tylihulo-Berezanka became part of Anatolivka Raion of Odesa Okruha, with the administrative center in Anatolivka. In the same year, the center of the raion was moved to Tylihulo-Berezanka, and later raion was renamed Tylihulo-Berezanka. In 1925, the governorates were abolished, and okruhas were directly subordinated to Ukrainian SSR. In 1926, Tylihulo-Berezanka was renamed Berezanka. In 1930, okruhas were abolished, and on 27 February 1932, Odesa Oblast was established, and Tylihulo-Berezanka Raion was included into Odesa Oblast. On 22 September 1937, Mykolaiv Oblast split off Odesa Oblast, and Tylihulo-Berezanka Raion became part of newly created Mykolaiv Oblast. In January 1963, during the abortive Khrushchyov administrative reform, Tylihulo-Berezanka Raion was abolished, and Berezanka was included into Mykolaiv Raion. In 1966, Berezanka Raion was re-established in the area previously occupied by Tylihulo-Berezanka Raion. Simultaneously, Berezanka was granted urban-type settlement status.

On 18 July 2020, Berezanka Raion was abolished as part of the administrative reform of Ukraine, which reduced the number of raions of Mykolaiv Oblast to four. The area of Berezanka Raion was merged into Mykolaiv Raion. On 26 January 2024, a new law entered into force which abolished the status of urban-type settlement status, and Berezanka became a rural settlement.

== Demographics ==
As of the census in 2001, Berezanka had a population of 4,163 people. The linguistic composition of the population as of the census was as follows:

Native languages in Berezanka
	percent
Ukrainian	93.4%
Russian	5.3%
Romanian	0.5%
Armenian	0.1%
Polish	0.1%
Belarusian	0.1%
Gagauz	0.1%
others	0.4%

== Economy ==
=== Transportation ===
The M14 highway, which connects Odesa and Mykolaiv, runs immediately south of Berezanka. This stretch of the highway coincides with the European route E58.

== People from Berezanka ==
- Valeriy Pustovoitenko (born 1947), Ukrainian Prime Minister 1997–1999

== Gallery ==
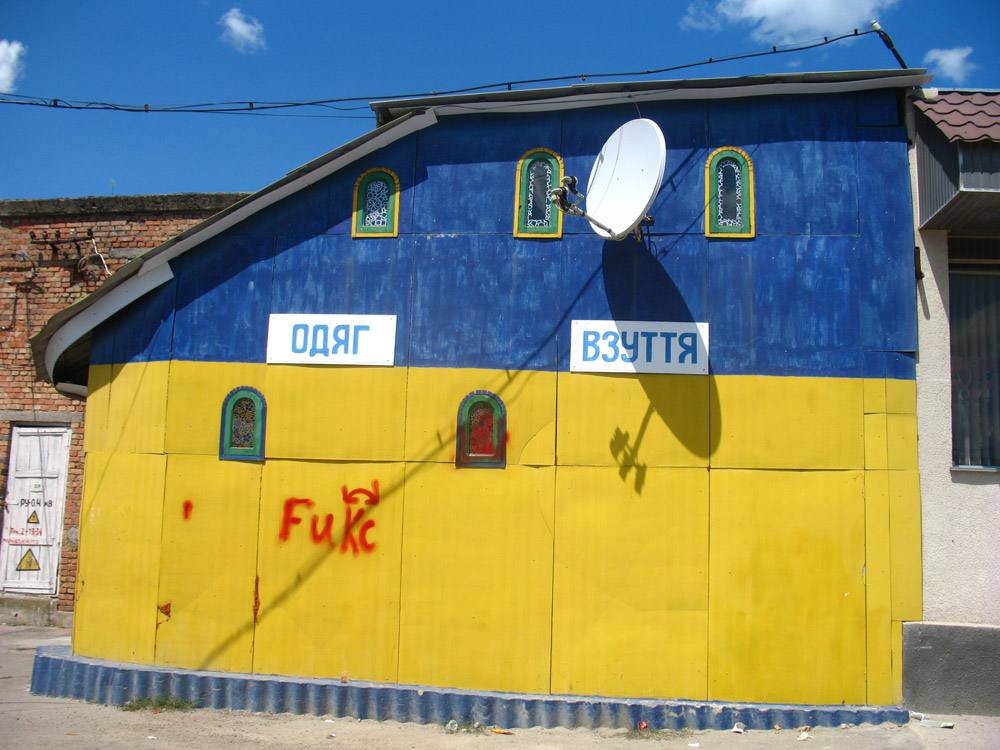

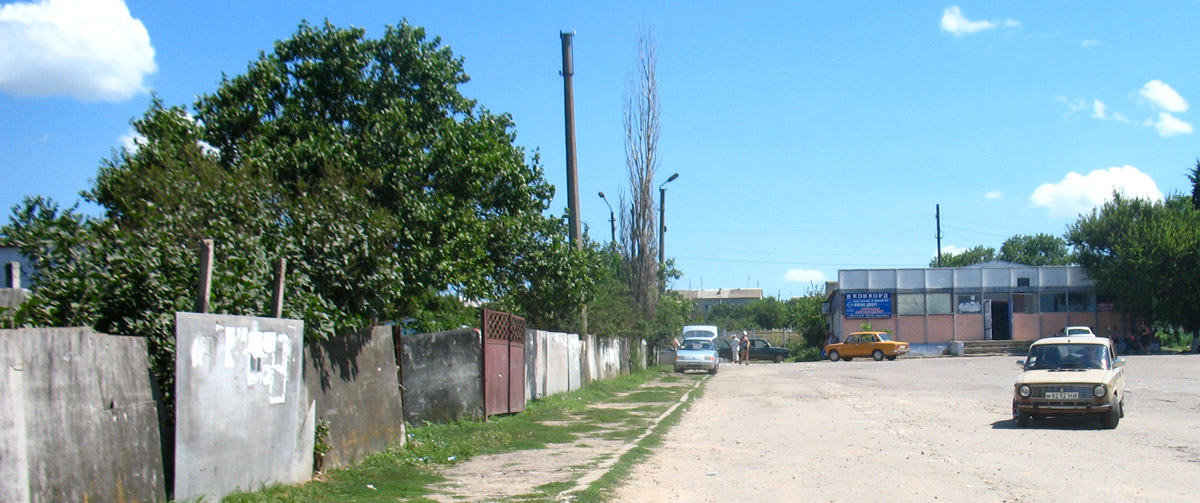

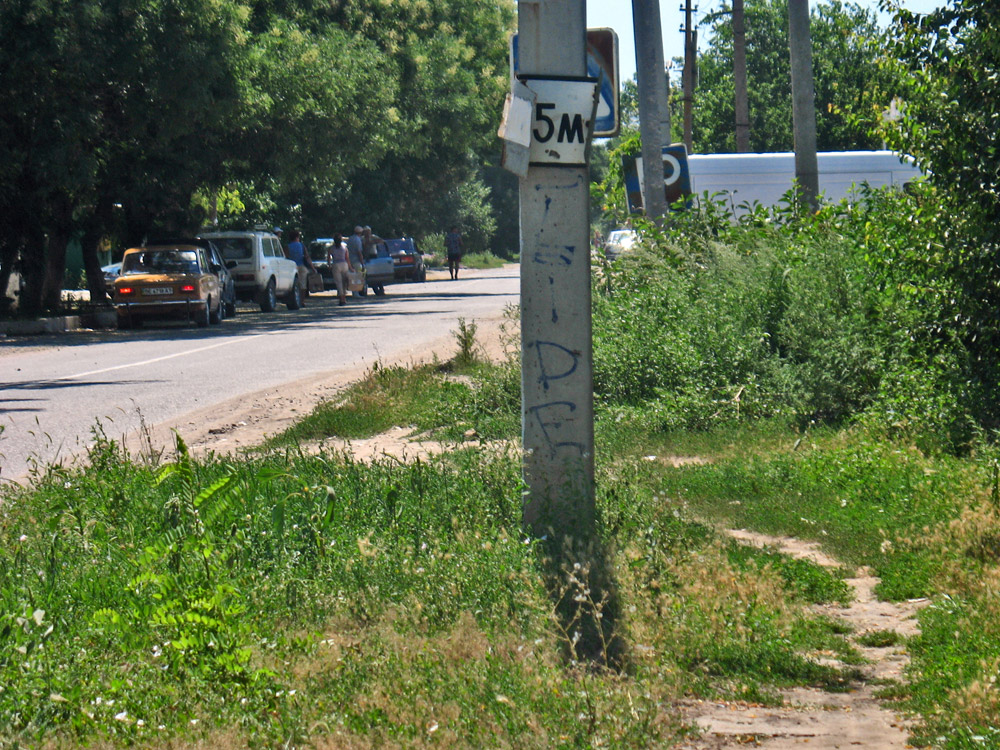

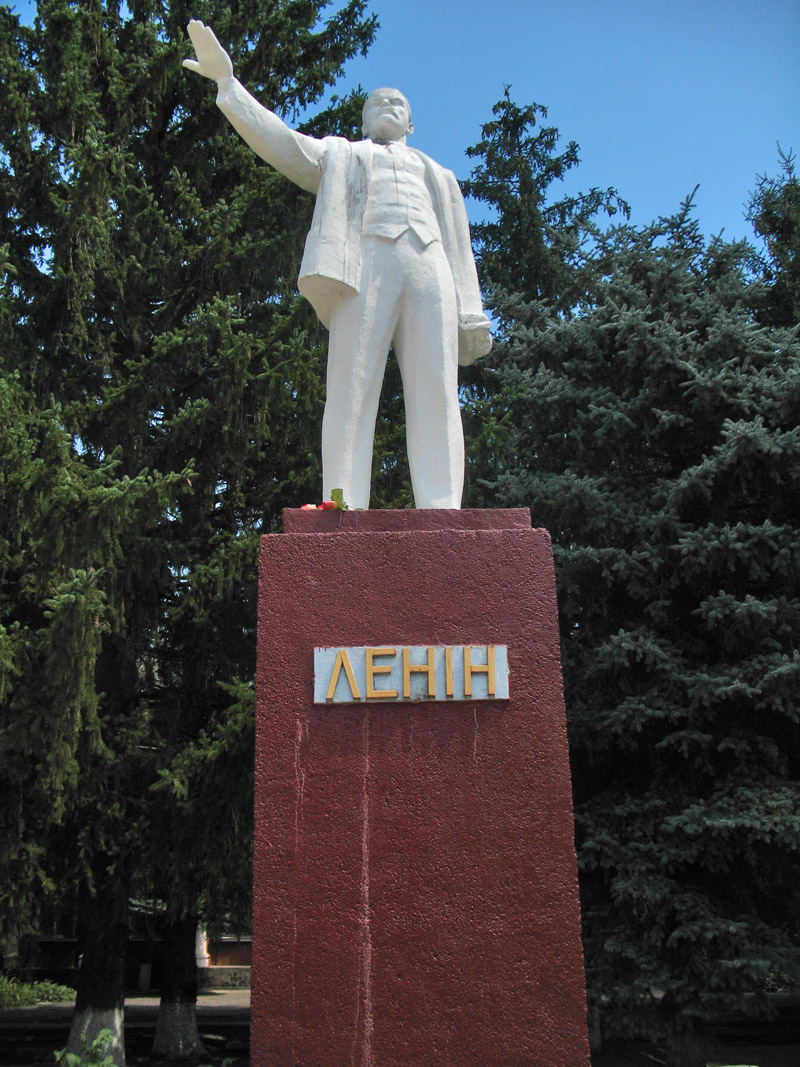

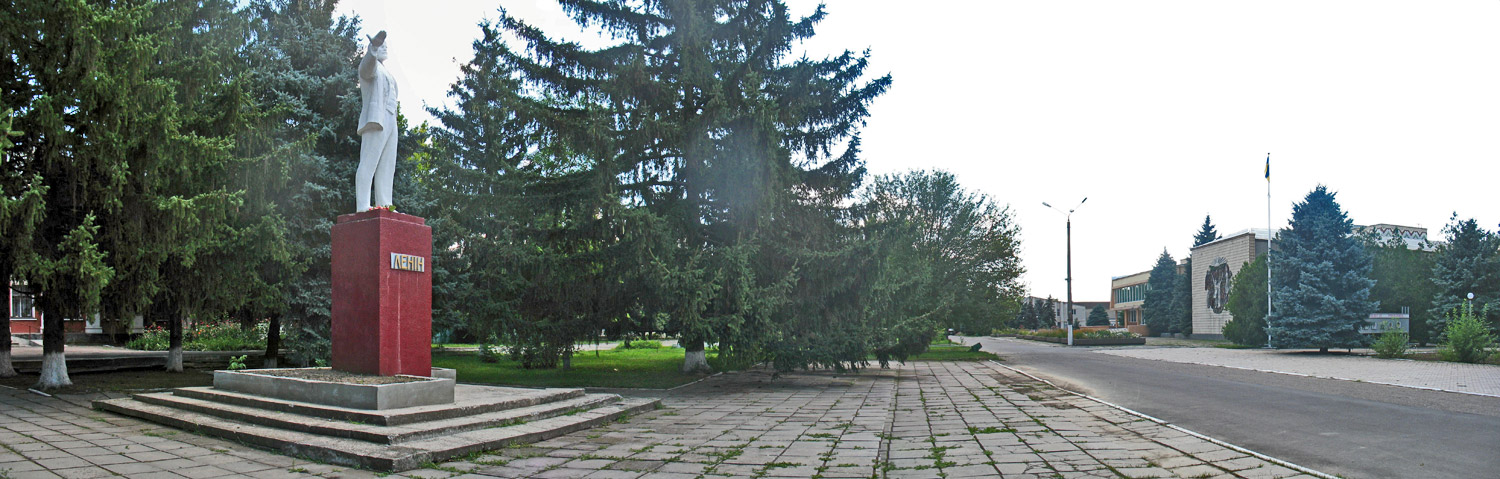

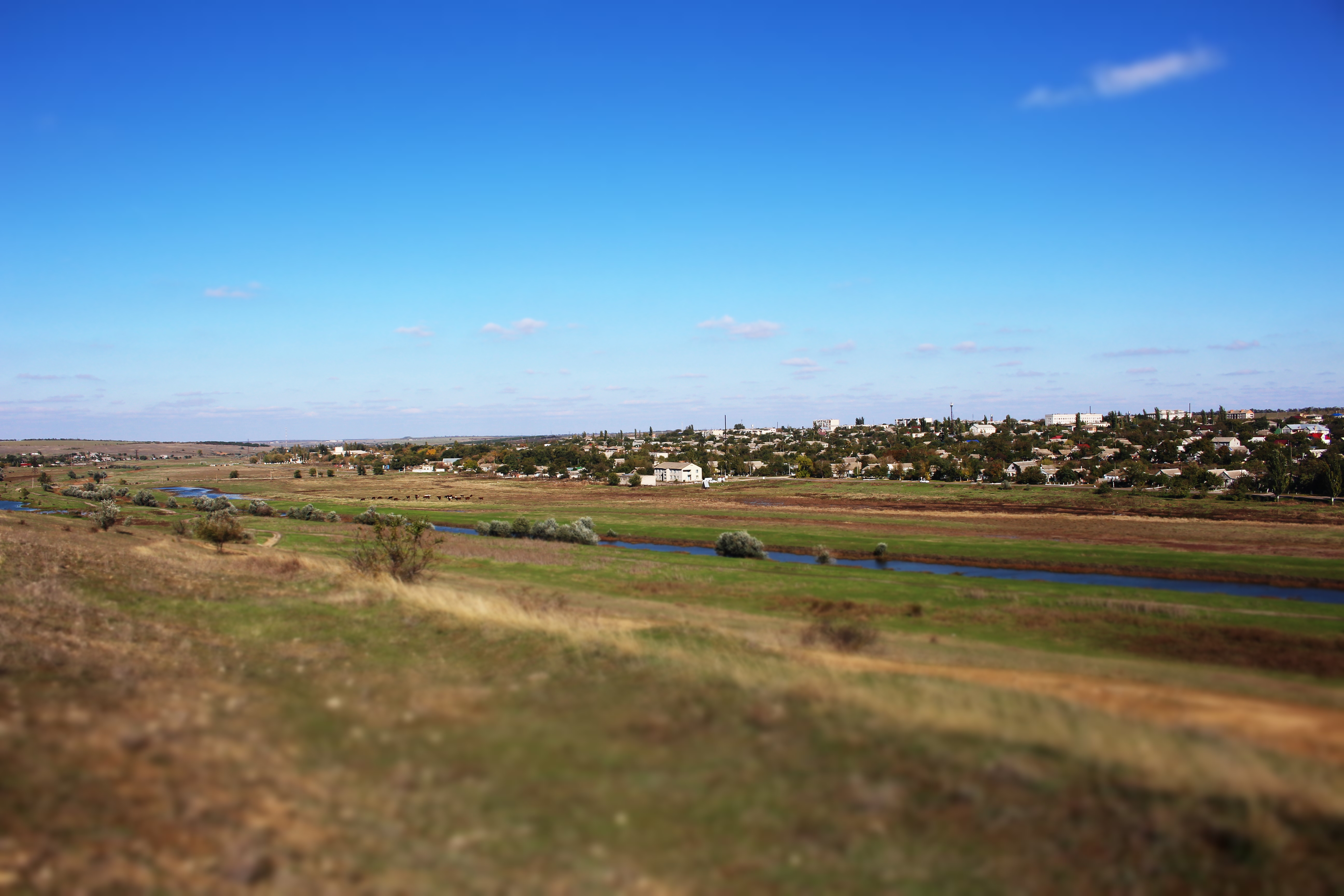

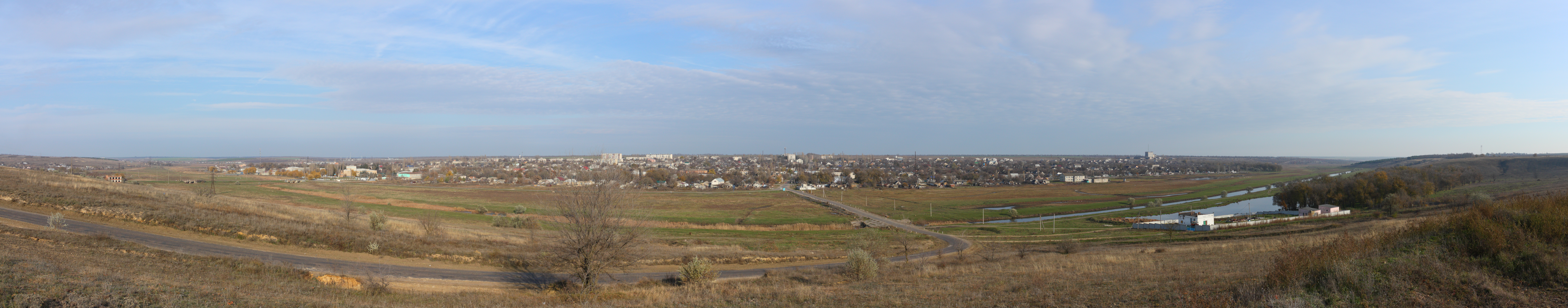
