= Lozova, Ternopil Oblast =

Rural locality in Ternopil Oblast, Ukraine

Lozova Лозова
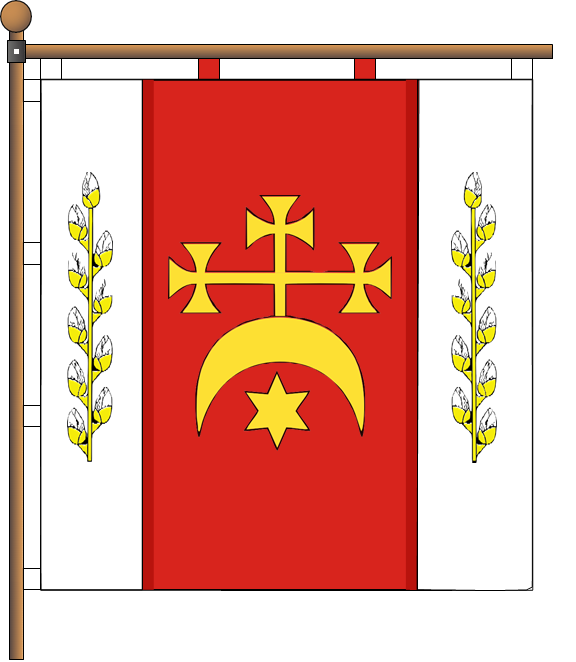
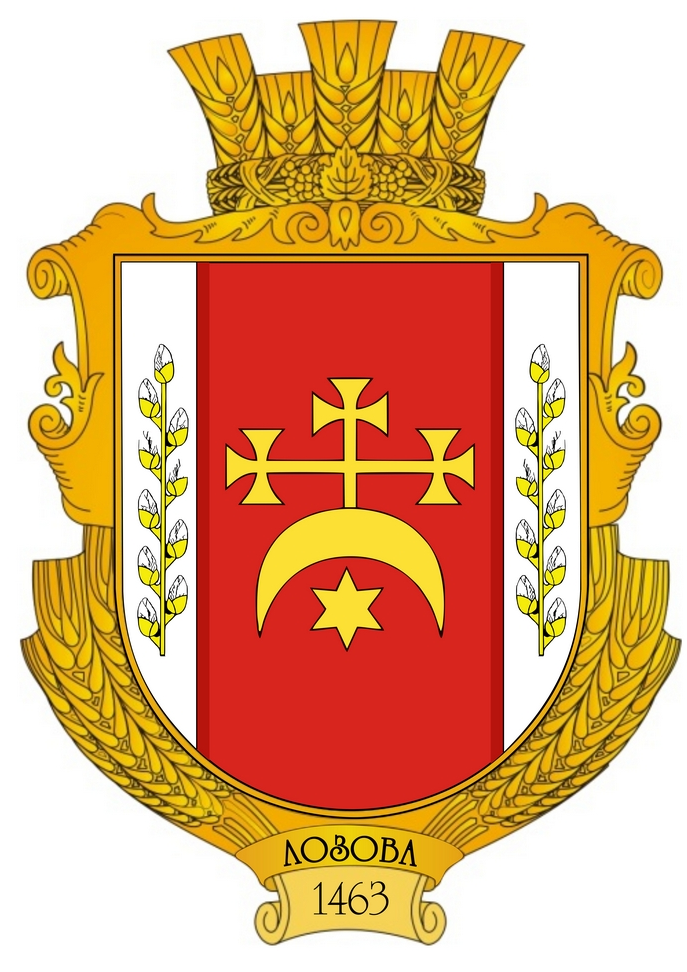
- Flag Coat of arms

- Location in Ternopil Oblast
- Coordinates: 49°36′39″N 25°40′13″E
- Country: Ukraine
- Oblast: Ternopil Oblast
- Raion: Ternopil Raion
- Hromada: Baikivtsi rural hromada
- Time zone: UTC+2 (EET)
  - Summer (DST): UTC+3 (EEST)
- Postal code: 47710

Lozova (Ukrainian: Лозова) is a village in Baikivtsi rural hromada, Ternopil Raion, Ternopil Oblast, Ukraine.

== History ==
The first written mention of the village was in 1463.

== Religion ==
- Saints Peter and Paul church (UGCC, 1999, brick).

== Sources ==
- (in Ukrainian) Бігус М., Мельничук Б., Лозова // Ternopil Encyclopedic Dictionary: in 4 v. / editorial board: H. Yavorskyi and other, Ternopil: "Zbruch", 2005, V. 2: К—О, S. 386—387. — ISBN 966-528-199-2.
- "Łozowa (1)". Geographical Dictionary of the Kingdom of Poland (in Polish). 5. Warszawa: Kasa im. Józefa Mianowskiego. 1884. p. 765.
