= Baikivtsi, Ternopil Oblast =

Rural locality in Ternopil Oblast, Ukraine

Baikivtsi Байківці
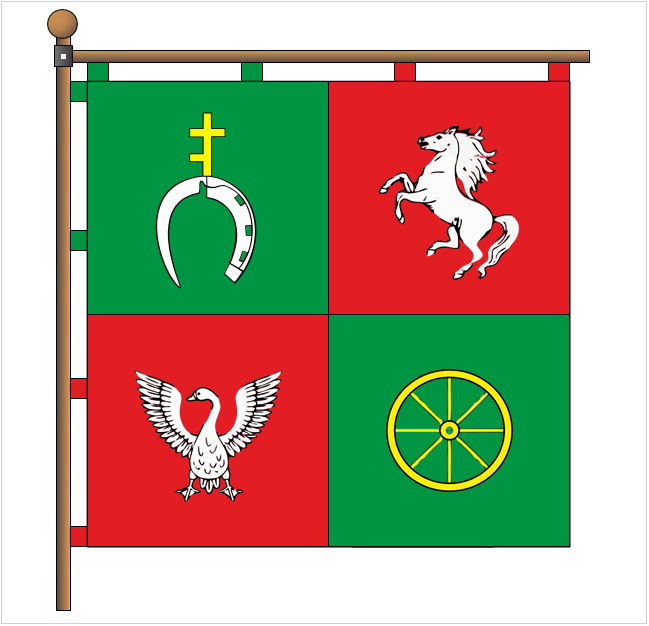
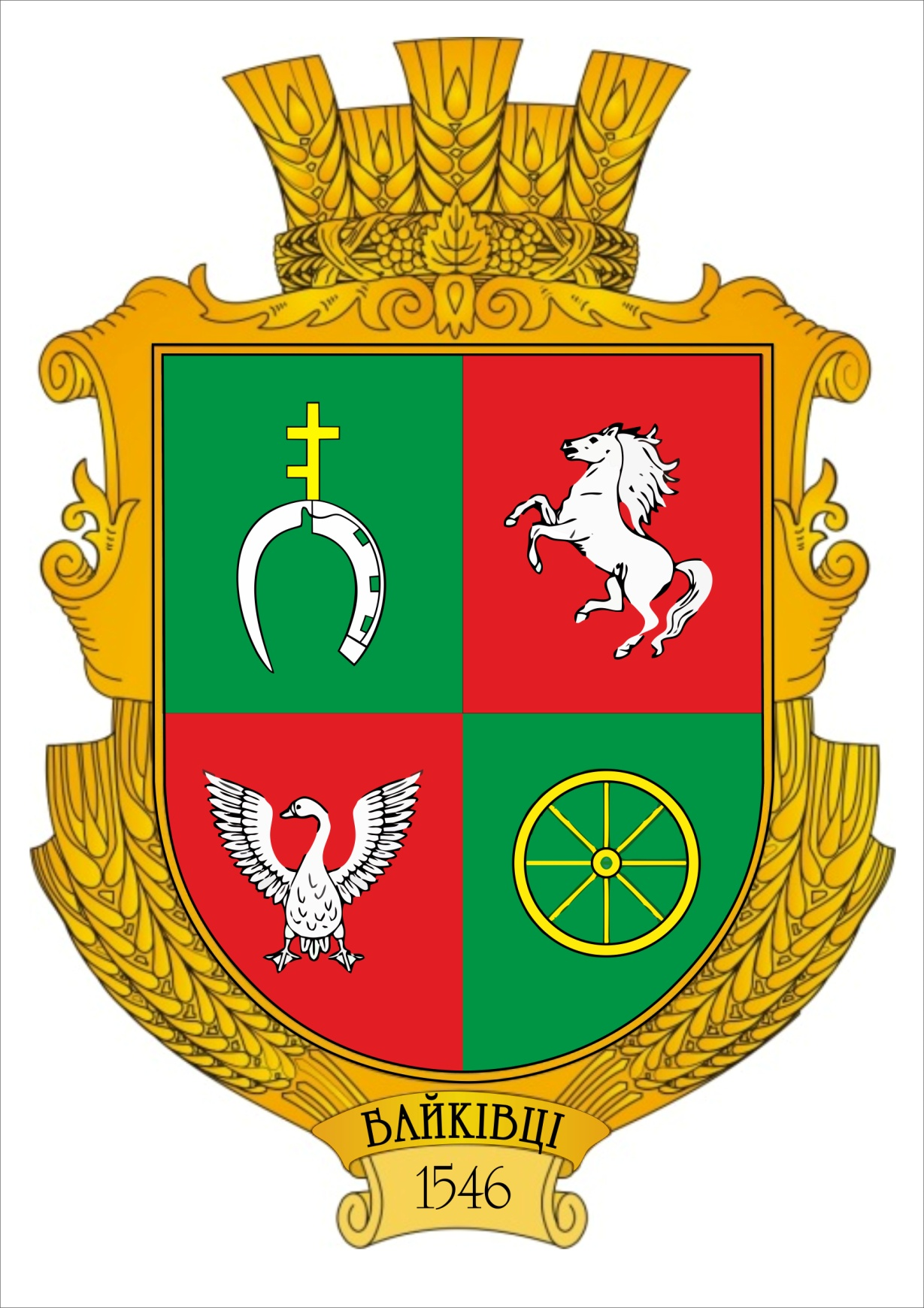
- Flag Coat of arms

- Location in Ternopil Oblast
- Coordinates: 49°33′37″N 25°41′14″E
- Country: Ukraine
- Oblast: Ternopil Oblast
- Raion: Ternopil Raion
- Hromada: Baikivtsi Hromada
- Time zone: UTC+2 (EET)
  - Summer (DST): UTC+3 (EEST)
- Postal code: 47711

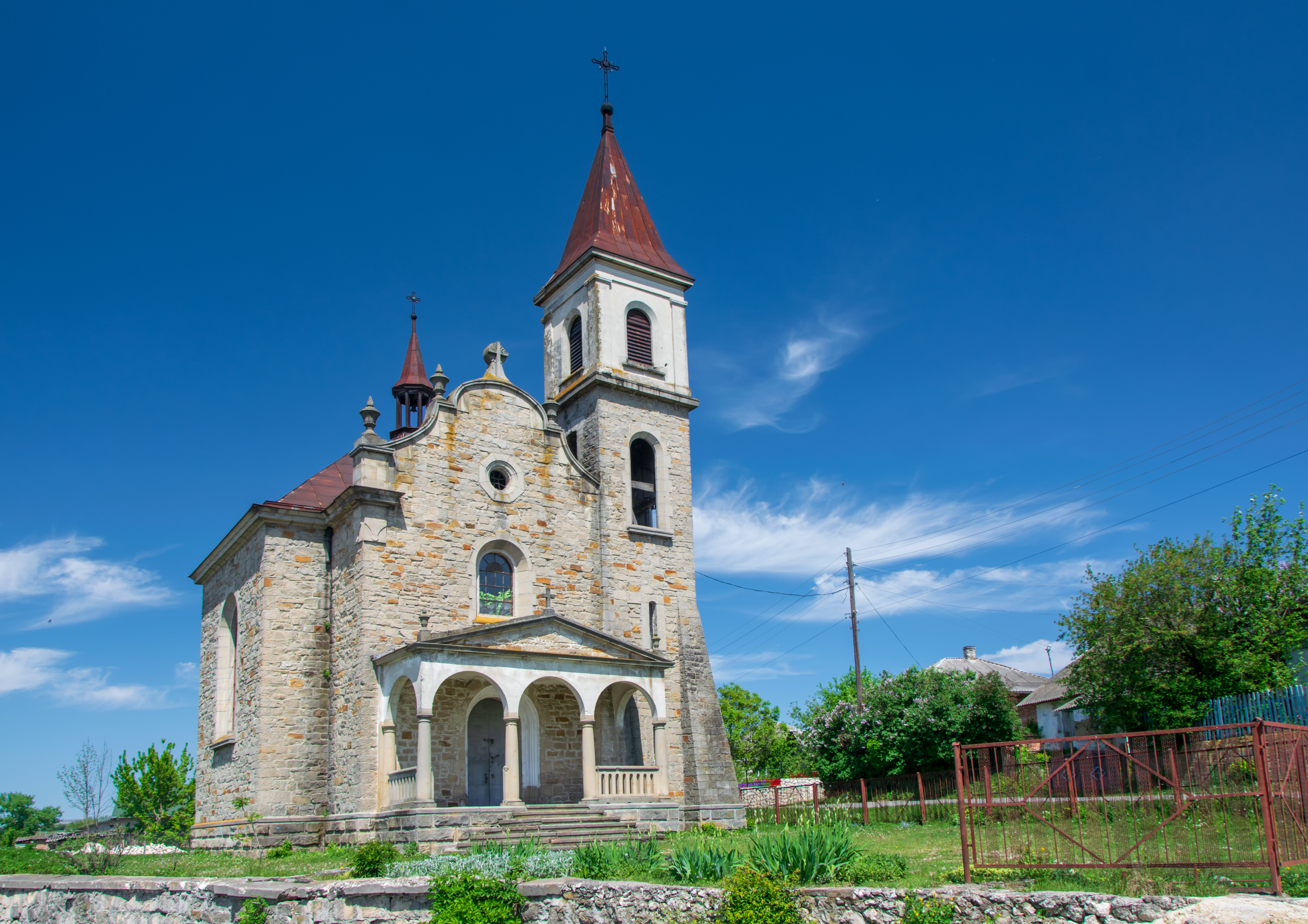
Baikivtsi

Baikivtsi (Ukrainian: Байківці) is a village in Baikivtsi rural hromada, Ternopil Raion, Ternopil Oblast, Ukraine.

== History ==
The first written mention is from 1546.

== Religion ==
- Saint Paraskeva Ternovska Church (1900, brick)
- church (1901, rebuilt in 1936, brick, consecrated in 1937, RCC)
