= Shliakhtyntsi =

Rural locality in Ternopil Oblast, Ukraine

Shliakhtyntsi Шляхтинці
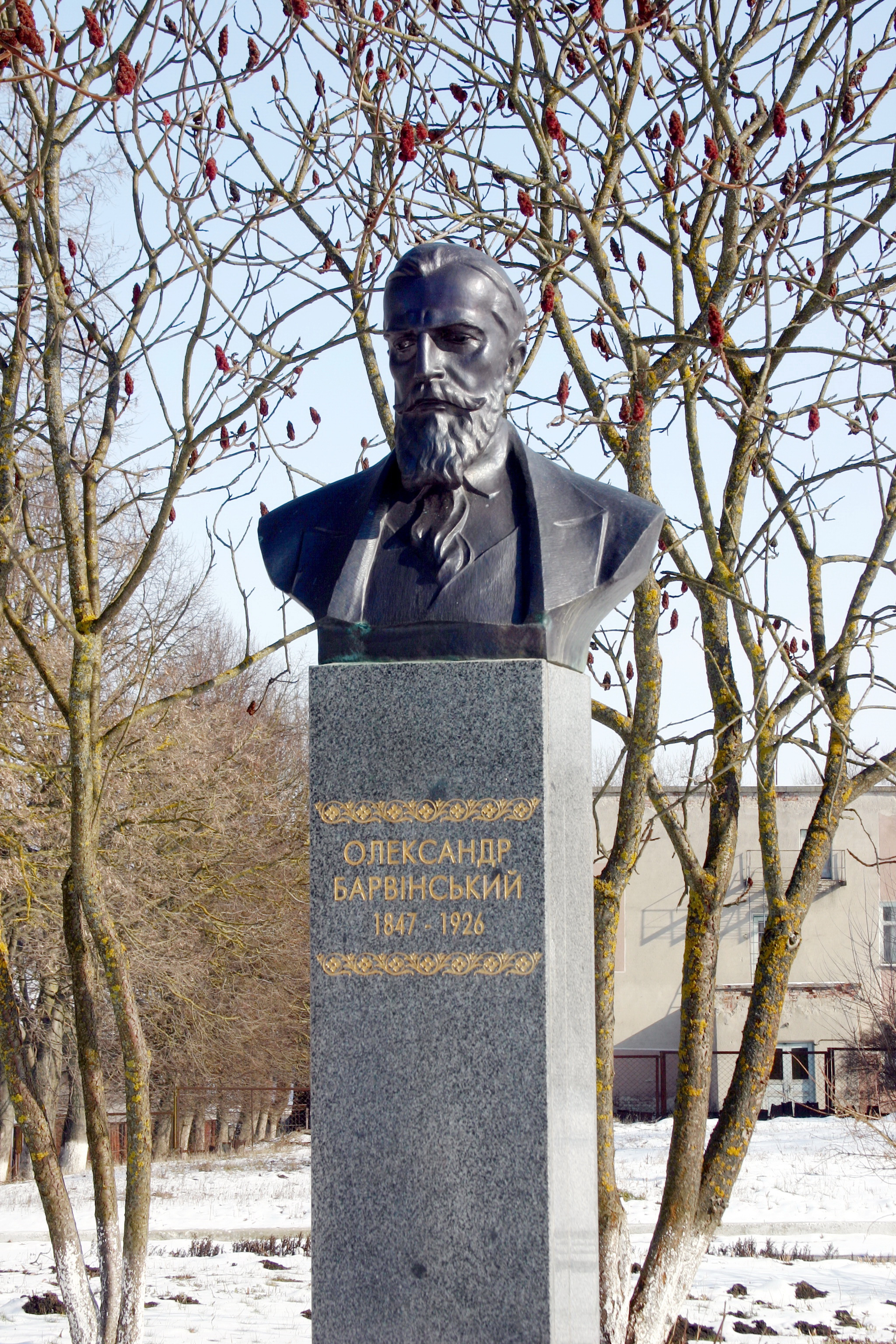
- Bust of Oleksandr Barvinskyj in Shliakhtyntsi

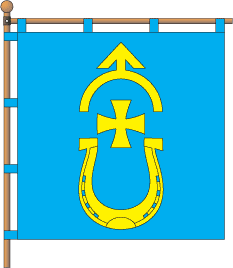
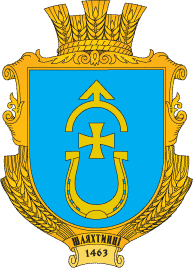
- Flag Coat of arms

- Location in Ternopil Oblast
- Coordinates: 49°35′2″N 25°39′55″E
- Country: Ukraine
- Oblast: Ternopil Oblast
- Raion: Ternopil Raion
- Hromada: Baikivtsi Hromada
- Time zone: UTC+2 (EET)
  - Summer (DST): UTC+3 (EEST)
- Postal code: 47710

Shliakhtyntsi (Ukrainian: Шляхтинці) is a village in Ukraine, in the Baikivtsi rural community of Ternopil Raion, Ternopil Oblast. It is located on the Hnizdechna River in the center of the district. Until March 1991, it was called Gnizdychka.

== History ==
Archeological monuments from the Late Paleolithic, and Mesolithic have been found near Shliakhtyntsi.

== Population ==
According to the 2001 census of Ukraine, 847 people lived in the village. 100% of the population indicated Ukrainian as their native language.

== People ==
- Oleksander Barvinsky (1847–1926), important western Ukrainian cultural figure and politician, a founder of the Christian Social Party was born in Shliakhtyntsi.

== Landmarks ==
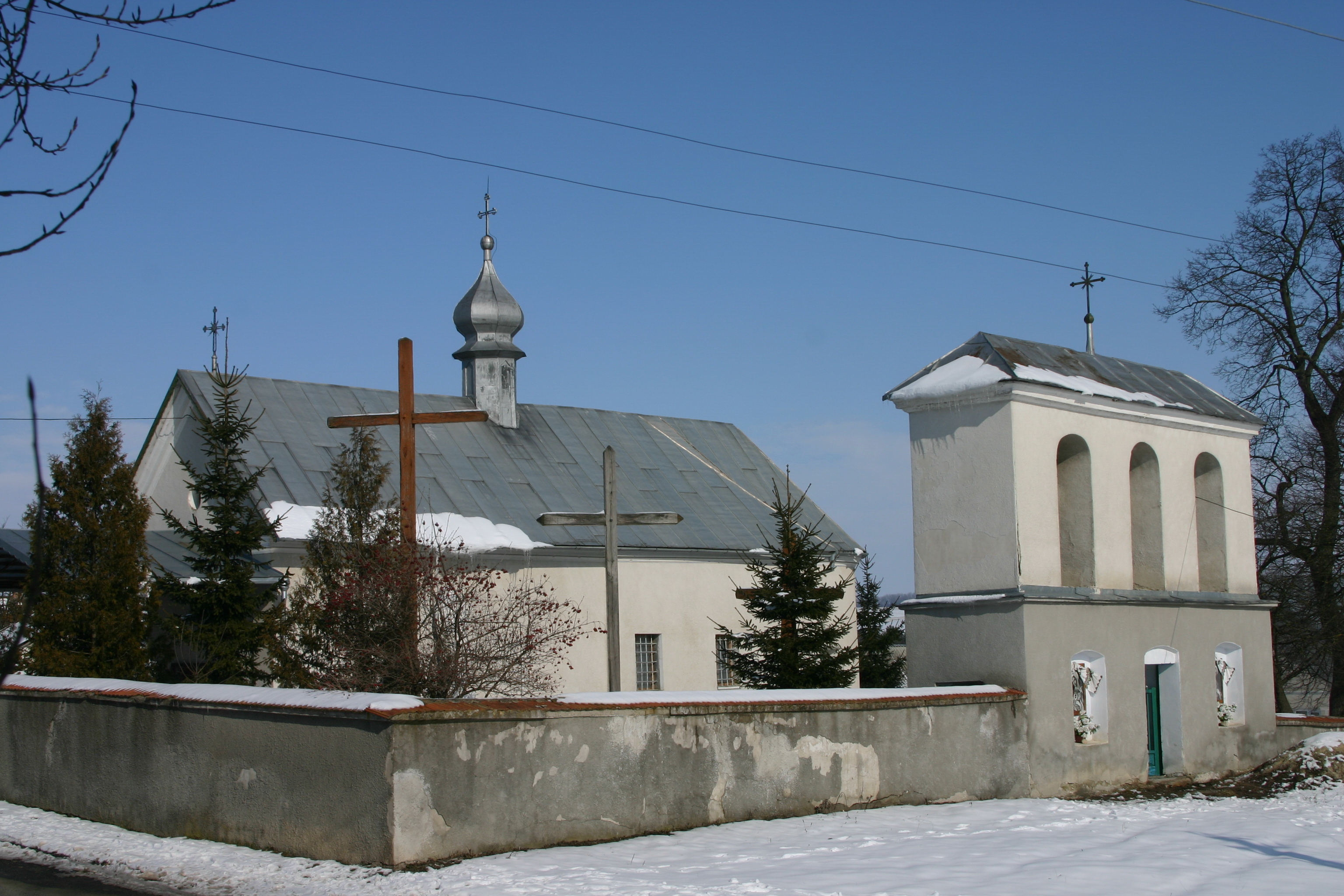
Church of the Holy Trinity

- Church of the Holy Trinity (1674, brick) is a Greek Orthodox church that has been declared an architectural monument of local significance.
- Monuments have been built to Shliakhtyntsi soldiers who died in the World War II and a monument to Oleksander Barvinsky.
