= Mykola Dmitrukh =

Ukrainian graphic artist and master of decorative art (born 1954)

- Микола Антонович Дмітрух
- Born: 20 June 1954 (age 72); Krasnopillia, Mykolaiv Oblast (now Ukraine)
- Education: Vyzhnytsia School of Applied Arts
- Occupations: Graphic artist and master of decorative art
- Awards: Merited Painter of Ukraine

Mykola Dmitrukh (Ukrainian: Микола Антонович Дмітрух; born 20 June 1954) is a Ukrainian graphic artist and master of decorative art. Member of the National Union of Artists of Ukraine from 1990 and the Association of Cartoonists of the All-Ukrainian Union of Caricaturists from 2007.

== Biography ==
Mykola Dmitrukh was born on 20 June 1954, in Krasnopillia, now part of the Berezanka Hromada in the Mykolaiv Raion of Mykolaiv Oblast, Ukraine.

In 1979, he graduated from the Vyzhnytsia School of Applied Arts, where his teachers included S. Varkhola, V. Zhavoronkov, and V. Kurov. From then, he has been active at the Ternopil Art and Production Combine, and from 1993, he has been a teacher at the Ternopil Children's Art School No. 1.

== Creativity ==
He began participating in all-Ukrainian and international exhibitions in 1979. His solo exhibitions have been held in Ternopil (2001), Jarosław (2002), Lubaczów (2002, 2004–2005), and Rzeszów (2005).

He works in the fields of easel and book graphics, including illustrations, posters, ex-libris, caricatures, drawings, and cartoons. His works are held in the collections of the Ternopil Museum of Local Lore, art museums in Ternopil, Mykolaiv, and Taiwan, the Lviv Palace of Arts, the Museum in Lubaczów, the House of Satire and Humor in Gabrovo (Bulgaria), the Museum of Caricature in Istanbul, the International Ex-Libris Center in Sint-Niklaas (Belgium), the Piranha Satire Gallery (Jarosław, Poland), the Ex-Libris Association (China), and private collections in Ukraine and abroad.

In his works, lines and forms are concise, and the compositions are conventional and associative. He masterfully combines the abstract with the real, while color and texture create a sense of grandeur and monumentality. In his graphic art, he maintains this concise style, but with a gentle and soft humor.

In 2004, M. Dmitrukh set a world record for drawing cartoons at the International Art Plein Air "Morka" (Poland). His students include Pavlo Shachko.

Among his important works are:

- The series of satirical drawings "Bez nazvy" (1979–1985); "Vesna 33-ho roku", "Bilyi svit" (both 1989), "Nad richkoiu v chistim poli", "Pam'iat" (both 1990), "Sicha" (1991), "Ternopilskyi zamok" (1995), "Ternopil. Tserkva Rizdva Khrystovoho" (1998), "Seredyna lita" (2002), "Melodiia stepu" (2003), "Pryborkanyi step" (2004), "Skifiia" (2006);
- The series: "Lehendy Ternopilshchyny" (1992–1995), "Skifiia" (1995–1999), "Kostely Polshchi" (1995–2000).
- Book design for "Krapelyny" and "Krapelyny-2" by B. Bastiuk and B. Melnychuk (1999).

== Awards ==
- Second Prize, All-Ukrainian Ex-Libris Competition (Ternopil, 1995)
- Second Prize, Lviv International Autumn Salon "Vysoky Zamok — 2000"
- Diploma in the "Best Drawing" category at the 11th International Biennial of Drawing and Graphic Arts (2003, Taiwan)
- Merited Painter of Ukraine (2017)
- Mykhailo Boichuk Prize (2020)

== Bibliography ==
- (in Ukrainian) Удіна Т., Дмітрух Микола Антонович // Ternopil Encyclopedic Dictionary: in 4 v. / editorial board: H. Yavorskyi and other, Ternopil: "Zbruch", 2004, V. 1: А—Й, S. 543. — ISBN 966-528-197-6.
- Дмітрух М. Обличчя Тернополя. — Т. : Колір Прінт, 2008. — 34 с.
- Сагаль О. Микола Дмітрух: «Карикатура — це візія світу » // Нова Тернопільська газета. — 2008. — 9 квіт. — С. 6.
- Дудка А. Микола Дмітрух — рекордсмен з шаржів // Нова ера. — 2008. — 21-27 трав. — С. 9.
- Погоріла,І. На яких людей найлегше малювати шаржі, розповідає тернополянин Микола Дмітрух // 20 хвилин. — 2009. — 26 серпня.
- Кущ Д. Історія в шаржах // Тернопільський оглядач. — 2008. — № 36 (10 жовт.). — С. 46—47.
- Сорока П. Світлий і людяний талант // Золота пектораль. — 2009. — № 1/2. — С. 143—144.
- Дмітрух. — Т.: Джура, 2014. — 2 с.
- Романів А. У «Короля дружніх шаржів» — ювілей // Свобода. — 2014. — № 54 (4 лип.). — С. 4.
- Сорока П. Микола Дмітрух: грані осяйного таланту // Літературний Тернопіль. — 2014. — № 3. — С. 77-83.
- Творець колоритних емоцій [Текст] / В. Миськів // Сільський господар плюс Тернопільщина. — 2024. — № 28 (10 лип.). — С. 6 : фот. — (Миколу Дмітруху - 70).
- Мистці Тернопільщини. Частина 1. Образотворче мистецтво: бібліографічний покажчик / департамент культури, релігій та національностей Тернопільської облдержадміністарації, Тернопільська обласна університецька наукова бібліотека; укладач Миськів В.; вступна стаття І. Дуда; керівник проєкту та науковий редактор Вітенко В.; редактор Жовтко Г. — Тернопіль : Підручники і посібники, 2015. — С. 117—123. — ISBN 978-966-07-2936-0.
- Снітовський О. Сміх — справа серйозна // Укрінформ. — 2015. — 1 квітня.
- Золотнюк А. Звуки та кольори степу // Вільне життя плюс. — 2015. — № 55 (10 лип.). — С. 6.
- Тимчук Л. Микола Дмітрух з Тернопілля — «король дружнього шаржу» // Погляд. — 2019. — 24 червня.
