= Baikivtsi rural hromada =

Rural hromada in Ternopil Oblast, Ukraine

Baikivtsi rural hromada Байковецька сільська громада
- hromada
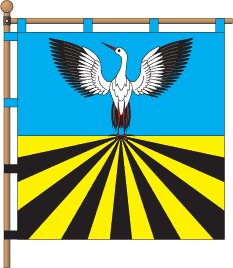
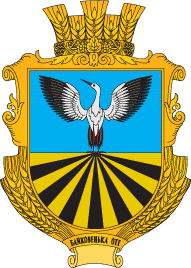
- Flag Coat of arms

- Location within Ternopil Oblast Location within Ukraine
- Coordinates: 49°33′37″N 25°41′14″E
- Country: Ukraine
- Oblast: Ternopil Oblast
- Raion: Ternopil Raion
- Administrative center: Baikivtsi

Government
  - Hromada head: Anatolii Kulyk

Area
  - Total: 86.2 km^{2} (33.3 sq mi)

Population (2022)
  - Total: 12,054
- Villages: 15
- Website: bsr1653.gov.ua

Baikivtsi rural territorial hromada (Ukrainian: Байковецька територіальна громада, romanized: Baikovetska silska terytorialna hromada) is a hromada in Ukraine, in Ternopil Raion of Ternopil Oblast. The administrative center is the village of Baikivtsi. Its population is 12,054 (2022 estimate)

== History ==
It was formed on 21 August 2015 by the combination of the Baikivtsi, Dubivtsi, Lozova, Stehnykivtsi, and Shliakhtyntsi rural councils of the Ternopil Raion.

== Settlements ==
The hromada consists of 15 villages:

- Anhelivka
- Baikivtsi
- Hai-Hrechynski
- Hai-Shevchenkivski
- Dubivtsi
- Kurnyky
- Lozova
- Okhrymivtsi
- Romanivka
- Romanove Selo
- Soborne
- Stehnykivtsi
- Stupky
- Cherneliv-Ruskyi
- Shliakhtyntsi
