= Pavlo Shachko =

Ukrainian painter, iconographer (born 2002)

- Павло Петрович Шачко
- Born: 20 September 2002 (age 23); Ternopil, Ukraine
- Education: Lviv National Academy of Arts
- Occupations: Painter, iconographer

Pavlo Shachko (Ukrainian: Павло Петрович Шачко; born 20 September 2002) is a Ukrainian painter, iconographer. Laureate of national and international competitions.

== Biography ==
Pavlo Shachko was born on 20 September 2002 in Ternopil.

He studied at Ternopil Specialized School No. 29, Ternopil School of Folk Crafts, Mykhailo Boichuk Ternopil Art School (2016, teacher Mykola Dmitrukh), Lviv National Academy of Arts (2024).

He lives and works in the village of Hai-Shevchenkivski, Ternopil Raion. He is fond of football.

== Creativity ==
In kindergarten, Pavlo showed a talent for drawing. He works in the fields of painting and iconography. He has created over 100 paintings, mostly depicting his native land and other subjects.

In August 2018, in 46 minutes and 20 seconds, he set a record in Ternopil by painting an avant-garde painting "Angel of Peace", which he dedicated to the Independence Day of Ukraine.

In 2024, Pavlo Shachko, together with Vladyslav Pechak, created a mosaic panel "The Virgin Orans" for the Church of the Assumption in the village of Hai-Shevchenkivski, Ternopil Raion.

== Exhibitions ==
Participant of collective exhibitions. Personal exhibitions in Ternopil (2014, 2015, 2018), Lviv (2018, 2021).

In Kyiv, the Leonid Kuchma Presidential Foundation "Ukraine" organized five solo exhibitions for the young artist. In particular, in 2016, at the Museum of Outstanding Figures of Ukrainian Culture of Lesia Ukrainka, Mykola Lysenko, Panas Saksahanskyi, and Mykhailo Starytskyi, and later that year, at the Taras Shevchenko National Museum, together with his teacher Mykola Dmitrukh, he presented a joint vernissage "From Teacher to Student". In 2020, a joint exhibition "Tricks of the Creative Spirit" was organized in the halls of the Taras Shevchenko National Museum, where Pavlo Shachko presented his works with Ivan Marchuk's "Shevchenkiana". One of them was also exhibited at the Literary Memorial House-Museum of Taras Shevchenko.

== Awards ==
- winner of the children's national competition "I am of the Cossack family" (Kyiv, 2012),
- second place at the Free Art Festival (Ternopil),
- winner of the All-Ukrainian contest "Miracle Child" in the nomination "The Most Creative Child of Ukraine" (Kyiv, 2015),
- winner of the All-Ukrainian competition "Child of the Year" (Kyiv, 2015),
- first prize of the All-Ukrainian Children's Drawing Competition "Happy Ukrainian Children on Horseback",
- Ivan Marchuk Prize (2016),
- Grand Prix of the international competition "I will create the best for God" (Ivano-Frankivsk, 2017),
- Diploma of the youngest participant of the 8th Repin painting plein air (Chuhuiv),
- gold medal at the International Children's Drawing Competition "Golden Easel" (Lviv, 2018).

== Bibliography ==
- Дмітрух М. Дар, отриманий від Бога // Дзвін. — 2017. — No. 3. — p. 240—243.
- Сорока П. Естетичне одкровення Павла Шачка // Дзвін. — 2017. — No. 3. — p. 244—248.
- Талановиті діти Тернопілля // Свобода. — 2015. — 2 груд. — p. 5.
- Павло Шачко [Текст] : [буклет]. — Тернопіль : [б. в.], 2015. — 5 pp.
