= Berezanka Raion =

Former subdivision of Mykolaiv Oblast, Ukraine

Berezanka Raion Березанський район
- Raion
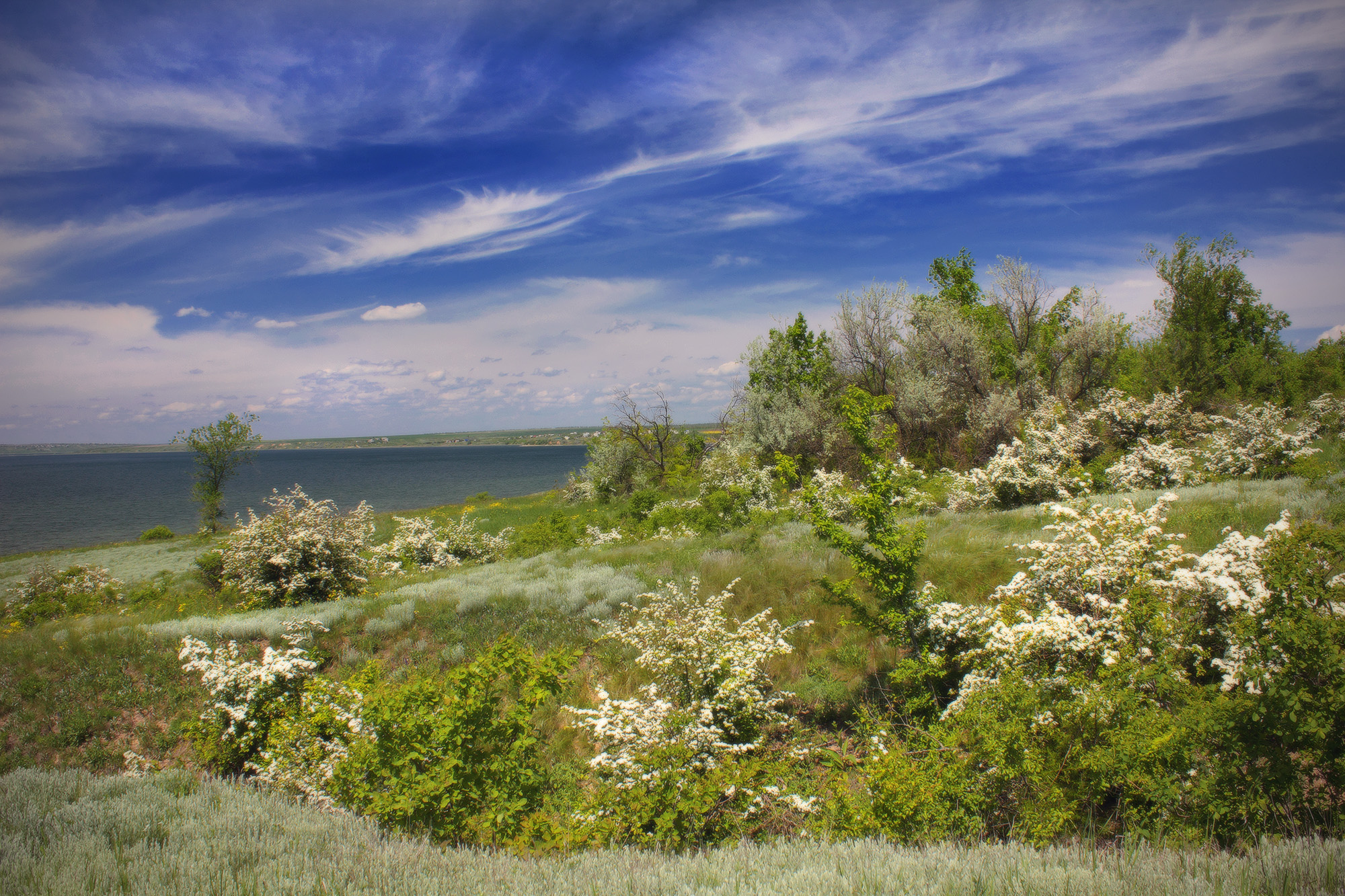
- Tylihul Estuary Landscape Park

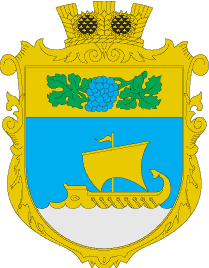
- Flag Coat of arms

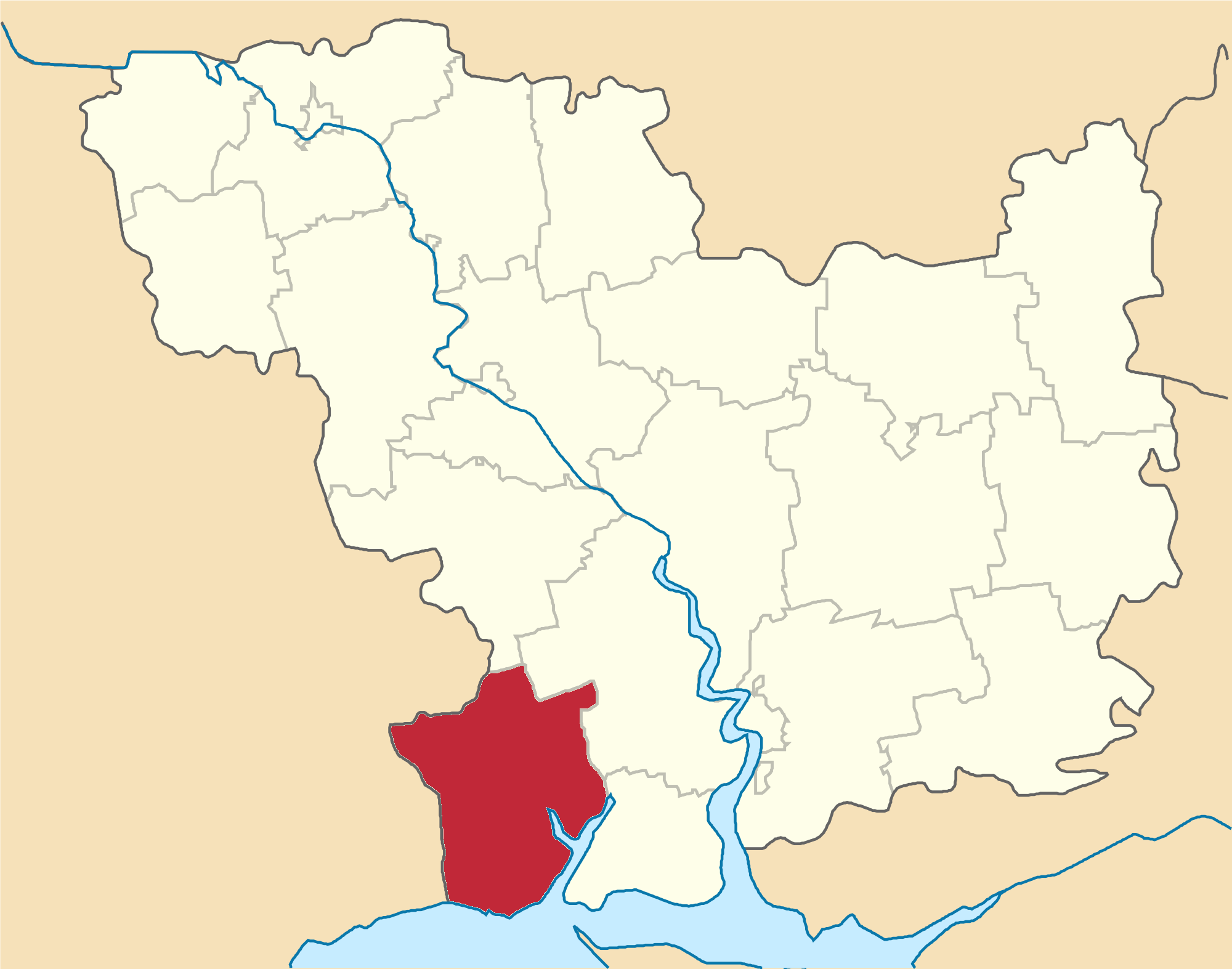
- Coordinates: 46°46′46″N 31°19′18″E
- Country: Ukraine
- Oblast: Mykolaiv Oblast
- Established: 1923
- Disestablished: 18 July 2020
- Admin. center: Berezanka
- Subdivisions: List: 0 — city councils; 1 — settlement councils; 16 — rural councils; Number of localities: 0 — cities; 1 — urban-type settlements; 45 — villages; 4 — rural settlements

Government
  - Governor: Sergiy Korchevskiy

Area
  - Total: 1,378 km^{2} (532 sq mi)

Population (2020)
  - Total: 22,422 ▼
  - Density: 16.27/km^{2} (42.14/sq mi)
- Time zone: UTC+02:00 (EET)
  - Summer (DST): UTC+03:00 (EEST)
- Postal index: 57400—57464
- Area code: +380 5153

Berezanka Raion (Ukrainian: Березанський район) was a subdivision of Mykolaiv Oblast of Ukraine. Its administrative center was the urban-type settlement of Berezanka. The raion was abolished on 18 July 2020 as part of the administrative reform of Ukraine, which reduced the number of raions of Mykolaiv Oblast to four. The area of Berezanka Raion was merged into Mykolaiv Raion. The last estimate of the raion population was 22,422 (2020 est.)

== History ==
In the 19th century, the area belonged to Odessky Uyezd of Kherson Governorate. On 16 April 1920, Odessa Governorate split off, and Odessky Uyezd was moved to Odessa Governorate. In 1923, uyezds in Ukrainian Soviet Socialist Republic were abolished, and the governorates were divided into okruhas. In 1923, Anatolivka Raion of Odessa Okruha, with the administrative center in Anatolivka, was established. In the same year, the center of the raion was moved to Tylihulo-Berezanka, and later raion was renamed Tylihulo-Berezanka. In 1925, the governorates were abolished, and okruhas were directly subordinated to Ukrainian SSR. In 1926, Tylihulo-Berezanka was renamed Berezanka. In 1930, okruhas were abolished, and on 27 February 1932, Odessa Oblast was established, and Tylihulo-Berezanka Raion was included into Odessa Oblast. On 22 September 1937, Mykolaiv Oblast split off Odessa Oblast, and Tylihulo-Berezanka Raion became part of newly created Mykolaiv Oblast. In January 1963, during the abortive Khrushchyov administrative reform, Tylihulo-Berezanka Raion was abolished and split between Mykolaiv and Ochakiv Raions. In 1966, Berezanka Raion was re-established in the area previously occupied by Tylihulo-Berezanka Raion.

== Subdivisions ==
At the time of disestablishment, the raion consisted of two hromadas,

- Berezanka settlement hromada with the administration in Berezanka;
- Kobleve rural hromada with the administration in the selo of Kobleve.
