= Ihor Khorosh =

Ukrainian breeder (born 1967)

- Ігор Ярославович Хорош
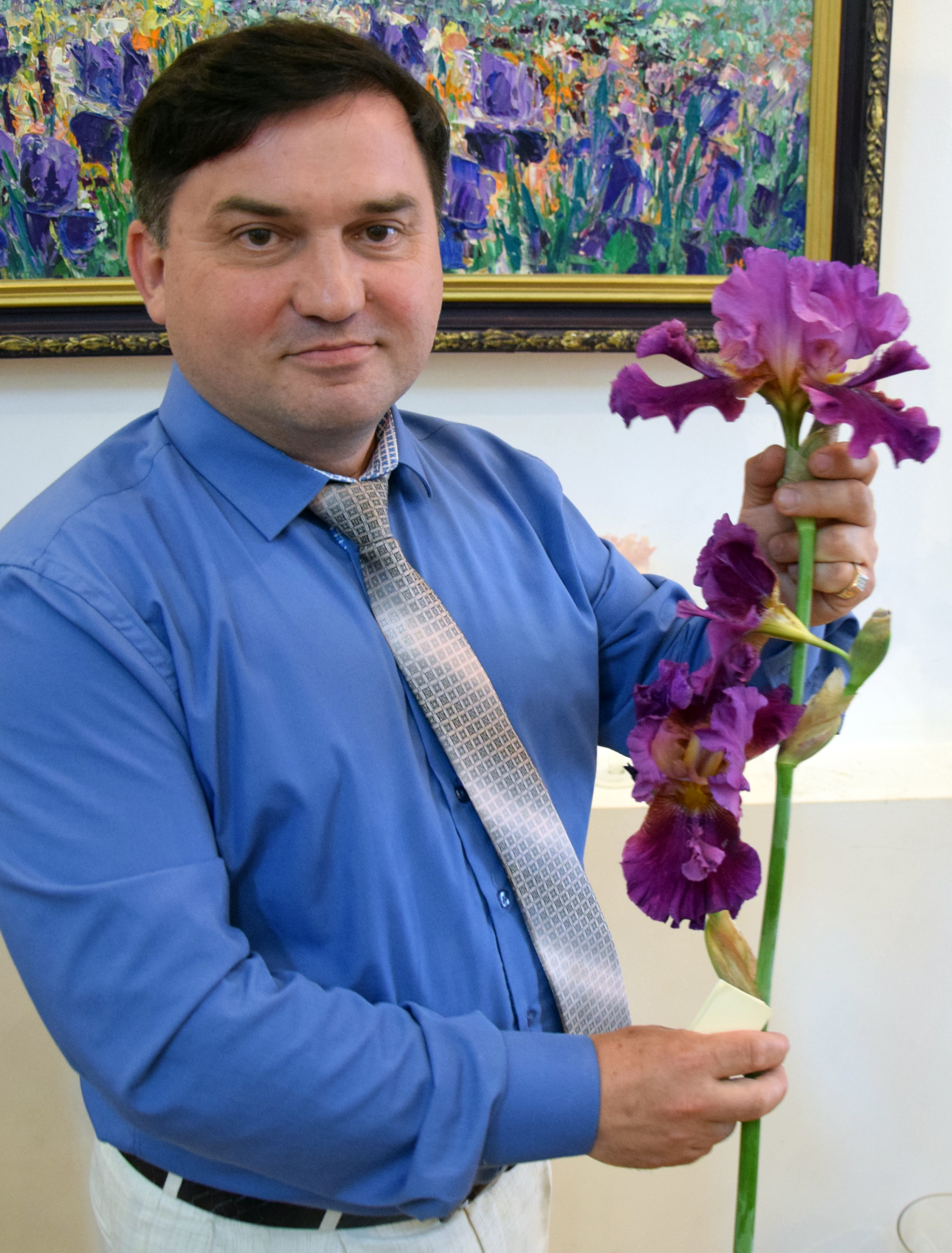
- Born: 19 March 1967 (age 59); Chernykhiv, Ternopil Oblast
- Education: Chortkiv Medical School, Ternopil Medical Institute

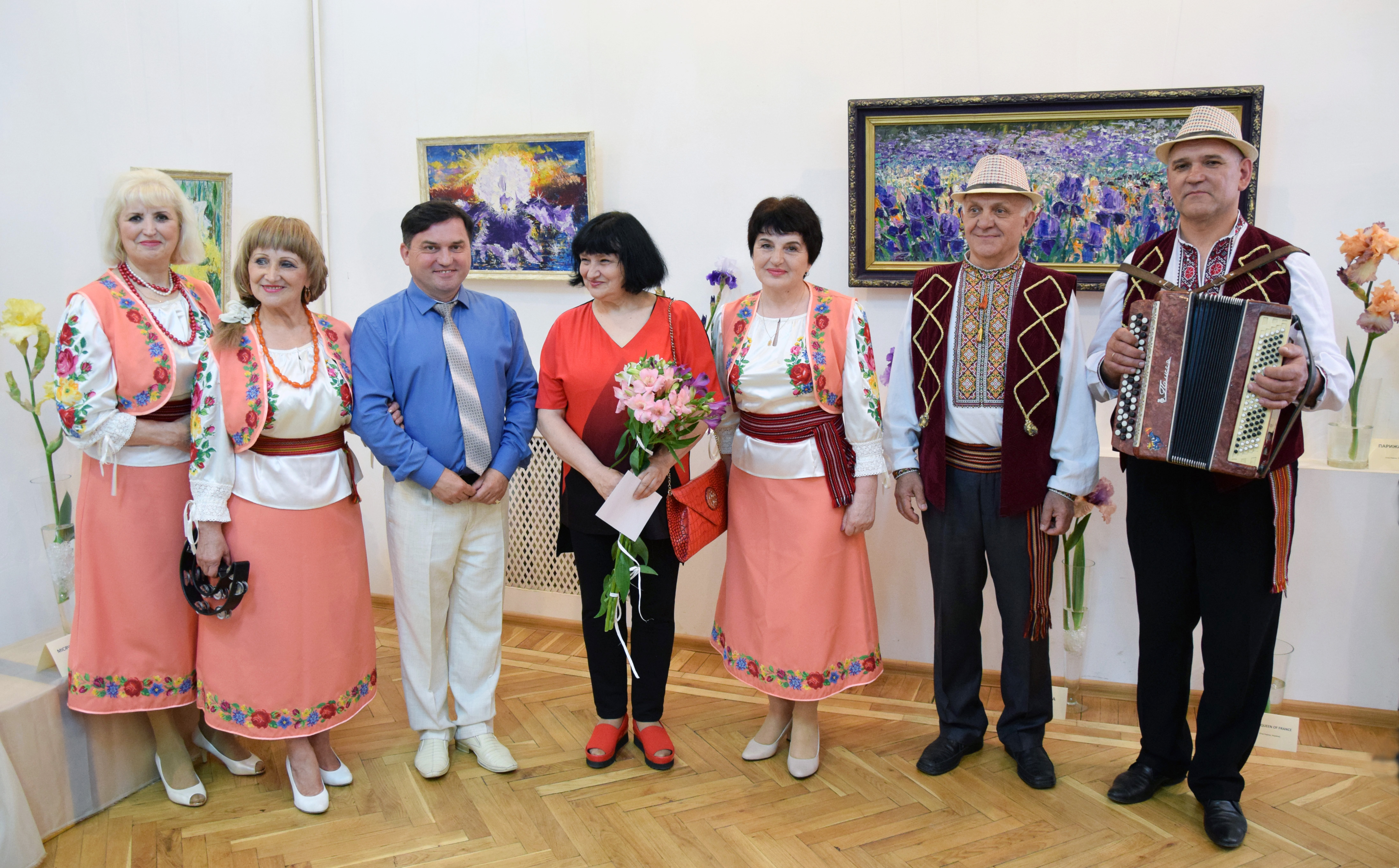
Ukrainian breeder Ihor Khorosh with Ternopil artist Natalia Basarab and members of the Pshenychne Pereveslo band.

Ihor Khorosh (Ukrainian: Ігор Ярославович Хорош; born 19 March 1967) is a Ukrainian entrepreneur, florist, breeder. Chairman of the judging panel of the Ukrainian Iris Society. Member of the Ukrainian, American, Italian, Central European, and honorary member of the French iris societies. Laureate of international and national iris competitions.

== Biography ==
Ihor Khorosh was born on 19 March 1967, in Chernykhiv, now the Ternopil Hromada, Ternopil Raion, Ternopil Oblast, Ukraine.

Graduated from Chortkiv Medical School and Ternopil Medical Institute. He worked as a paramedic and a doctor at the Ternopil Center for Emergency Ambulance and Disaster Medicine.

== Breeding ==
From 1989, he has been working on new varieties of iris (over 120), gladiolus (over 15), syringas (one of them is named after Liubov Izotova), and tree peonies. Founder and owner of the private enterprise "Ihor" (1992).

Most cockerel varieties are named after famous Ukrainian artists: Nazarii Yaremchuk, Lina Kostenko, Volodymyr Ivasiuk, Oksana Bilozir, Ivan Marchuk, Ostap Vyshnia, Vasyl Slipak, Nina Miroshnichenko, Natalia Basarab. Among the foreign stars are Anna German and Barbara Brylska. He dedicated varieties for his mother, Myroslava, Myroslava Khorosh, and his father, Yaroslav Khorosh. All are registered with the American Iris Society.

From 1999 – a participant of the personal exhibition "Irida" (Ternopil). His flowers can be found in the Hryshko National Botanical Garden, the Botanical Garden of Lviv University, the Radomysl Castle Landscape Park, in the Iris Valley of Ternopil and in the private collections of Lina Kostenko, Sofia Rotaru, and Barbara Brylska.

== Awards ==
- top 10 best varieties in the world at the international iris competition in Florence – for the variety Dolphin and Mermaid
- Nina Miroshnichenko Medal (2016) – for the variety Dolphin and Mermaid
