= Pleskivtsi =

Rural locality in Ternopil Oblast, Ukraine

Pleskivtsi Плесківці
- Location in Ternopil Oblast
- Coordinates: 49°41′58″N 25°26′13″E
- Country: Ukraine
- Oblast: Ternopil Oblast
- Raion: Ternopil Raion
- Established: 1583

Population (2014)
  - Total: 140
- Time zone: UTC+2 (EET)
  - Summer (DST): UTC+3 (EEST)
- Postal code: 47251
- Area code: +380 3540

Pleskivtsi (Ukrainian: Плесківці) is a village in Ternopil Raion, Ternopil Oblast (province) of western Ukraine. It belongs to Ternopil urban hromada, one of the hromadas of Ukraine.

== History ==
The first written mention is in 1583.

Ternopil Oblast Council by a decision of September 8, 2006 in Zboriv Raion restored the village of Pleskivtsi, previously united with the village of Chernykhiv.

There is a church of St. Dymytriy of the UGCC (1991).

Until 18 July 2020, Pleskivtsi belonged to Zboriv Raion. The raion was abolished in July 2020 as part of the administrative reform of Ukraine, which reduced the number of raions of Ternopil Oblast to three. The area of Zboriv Raion was merged into Ternopil Raion.

== Population ==
- Population in 1890: 510 inhabitants.
- Population in 1931: 560 inhabitants with over 116 houses.
- Population in 2007: 156 inhabitants.
- Population in 2014: 140 inhabitants with over 80 houses.

They were born in Pleskivtsi:

- teacher Maria Artemiak (b. 1961),
- leader of the group "Homin nad Seretom" Yuriy Artemiak (b. 1961),
- OUN member, public and political figure in Denmark Petro Balytskyi-Kuzma (b. 1923),
- dentist Semen Kochiy (1897–1990),
- Honored Worker of Culture of Ukraine Oksana Kochiy (b. 1941),
- teacher Iryna Lanovyk (Yarema; b. 1935),
- lawyer Yosyp Stotskyi (1907-1942),
- doctor Vasyl Snihur (born in 1934),
- teacher Bohdan Tataryn (b. 1943),
- teacher Olha Teshlia (b. 1965),
- public figure, local historian, writer Havrylo Chernykhivskyi (1936–2011),
- historian Dmytro Chernykhivskyi (b. 1929),
- musician Andriy Shelikhevych (b. 1954).
