= Nosivtsi =

Rural locality in Ternopil Oblast, Ukraine

Nosivtsi Носівці
- Location in Ternopil Oblast
- Coordinates: 49°43′43″N 25°23′09″E
- Country: Ukraine
- Oblast: Ternopil Oblast
- Raion: Ternopil Raion
- Established: 1546

Population (2014)
  - Total: 97
- Time zone: UTC+2 (EET)
  - Summer (DST): UTC+3 (EEST)
- Postal code: 47250
- Area code: +380 3540

Nosivtsi (Ukrainian: Носівці) is a village in Ternopil Raion, Ternopil Oblast (province) of western Ukraine. It belongs to Ternopil urban hromada, one of the hromadas of Ukraine.

Until 18 July 2020, Nosivtsi belonged to Zboriv Raion. The raion was abolished in July 2020 as part of the administrative reform of Ukraine, which reduced the number of raions of Ternopil Oblast to three. The area of Zboriv Raion was merged into Ternopil Raion.

== History ==
The first written mention is in 1546.

There is the Church of the Exaltation of the Holy Cross (1879, wooden).

== Population ==
- Population in 1890: 366 inhabitants.
- Population in 1910: 458 inhabitants.
- Population in 1931: 515 inhabitants with over 97 houses.
- Population in 2003: 124 inhabitants.
- Population in 2014: 97 inhabitants with over 80 houses.
