= Hliadky, Ternopil Oblast =

Rural locality in Ternopil Oblast, Ukraine

Hliadky Глядки
- Location in Ternopil Oblast
- Coordinates: 49°40′02″N 25°28′23″E
- Country: Ukraine
- Oblast: Ternopil Oblast
- Raion: Ternopil Raion

Population (2014)
  - Total: 213
- Time zone: UTC+2 (EET)
  - Summer (DST): UTC+3 (EEST)
- Postal code: 47251
- Area code: +380 3540

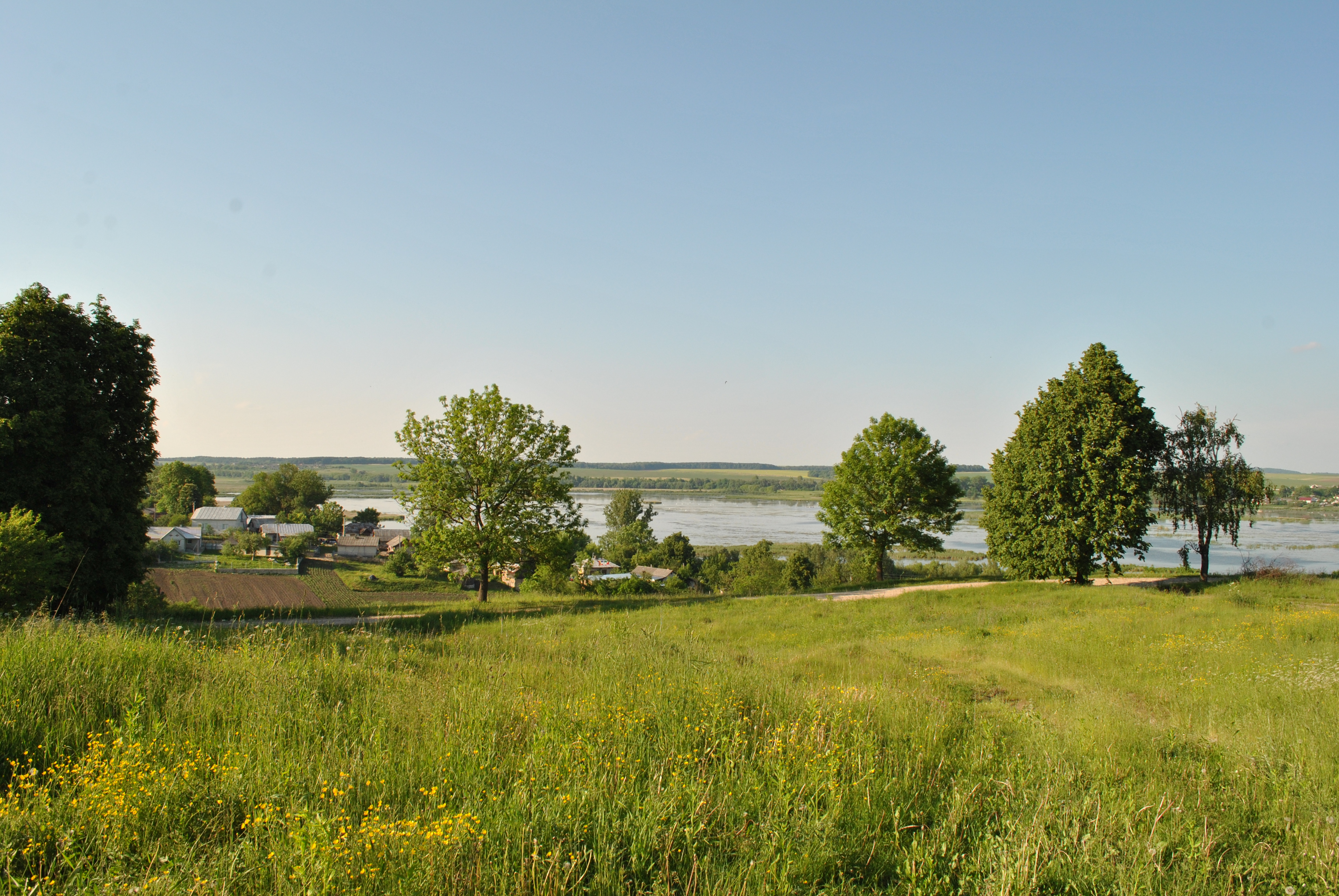
Hliadky

Hliadky (Ukrainian: Глядки) is a village in Ternopil Raion, Ternopil Oblast (province) of western Ukraine. It belongs to Ternopil urban hromada, one of the hromadas of Ukraine.

Until 18 July 2020, Hliadky belonged to Zboriv Raion. The raion was abolished in July 2020 as part of the administrative reform of Ukraine, which reduced the number of raions of Ternopil Oblast to three. The area of Zboriv Raion was merged into Ternopil Raion.

== Population ==
- Population in 1832: 386 inhabitants.
- Population in 1880: 486 inhabitants.
- Population in 1880: 714 inhabitants.
- Population in 1910: 797 inhabitants.
- Population in 1931: 692 inhabitants.
- Population in 2001: 272 inhabitants.
- Population in 2014: 213 inhabitants with over 127 houses.

They were born in Hliadky:

- doctor, public figure Lukiyan Karachko (b. 1900; according to other sources, born in 1899)
