= Malashivtsi =

Rural locality in Ternopil Oblast, Ukraine

Malashivtsi Малашівці
- Location in Ternopil Oblast
- Coordinates: 49°40′19″N 25°29′35″E
- Country: Ukraine
- Oblast: Ternopil Oblast
- Raion: Ternopil Raion

Area
  - Total: 1.38 km^{2} (0.53 sq mi)

Population (2014)
  - Total: 214
- Time zone: UTC+2 (EET)
  - Summer (DST): UTC+3 (EEST)
- Postal code: 47251
- Area code: +380 3540

Malashivtsi (Ukrainian: Малашівці) is a village in Ternopil Raion, Ternopil Oblast (province) of western Ukraine. It belongs to Ternopil urban hromada, one of the hromadas of Ukraine.

Until 18 July 2020, Malashivtsi belonged to Zboriv Raion. The raion was abolished in July 2020 as part of the administrative reform of Ukraine, which reduced the number of raions of Ternopil Oblast to three. The area of Zboriv Raion was merged into Ternopil Raion.

== Population ==
- Population in 1880: 680 inhabitants.
- Population in 1921: 821 inhabitants with over 148 houses.
- Population in 1972: 4476 inhabitants with over 159 houses.
- Population in 2014: 246 inhabitants with over 145 houses.

== Gallery ==
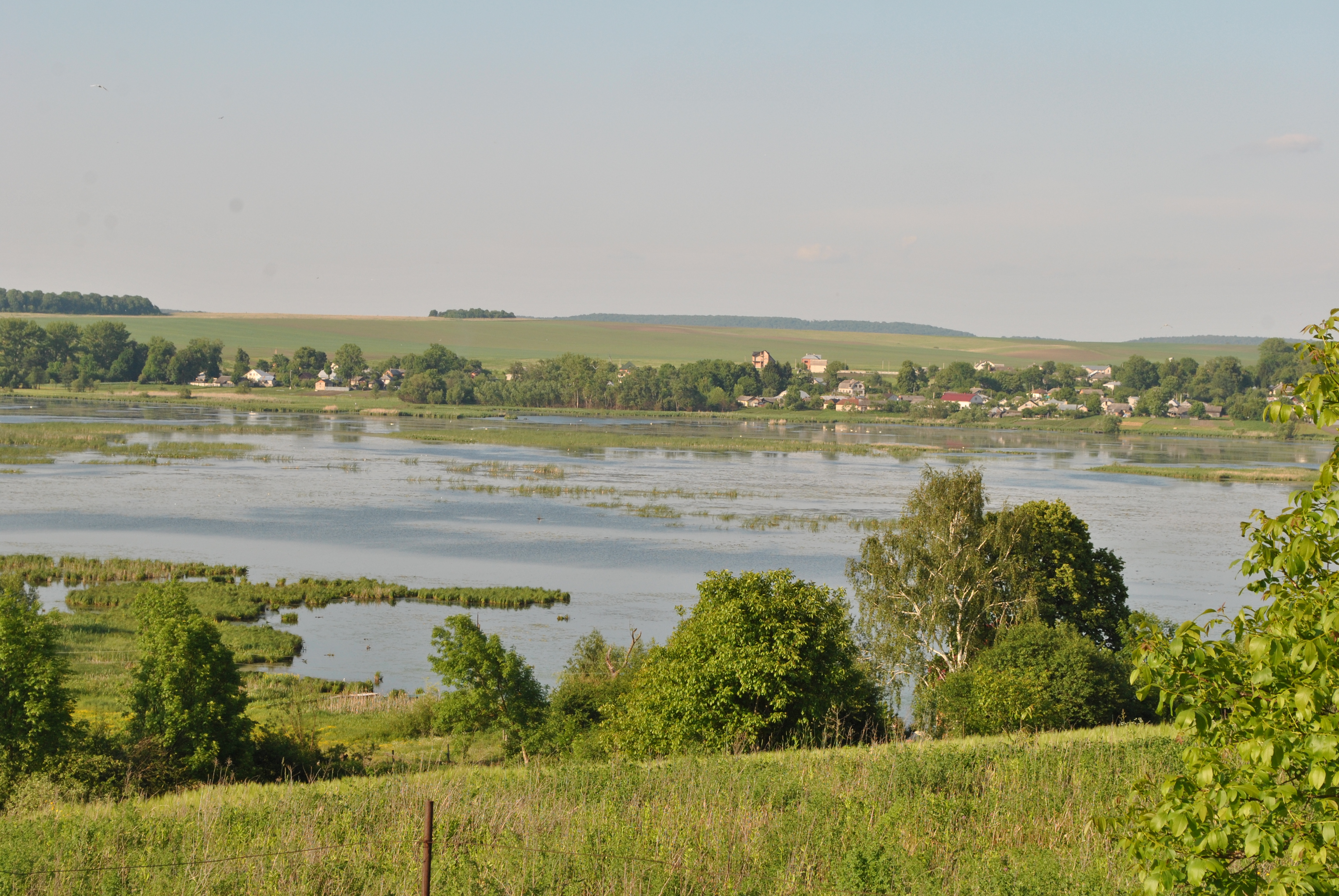
View on Malashivtsi

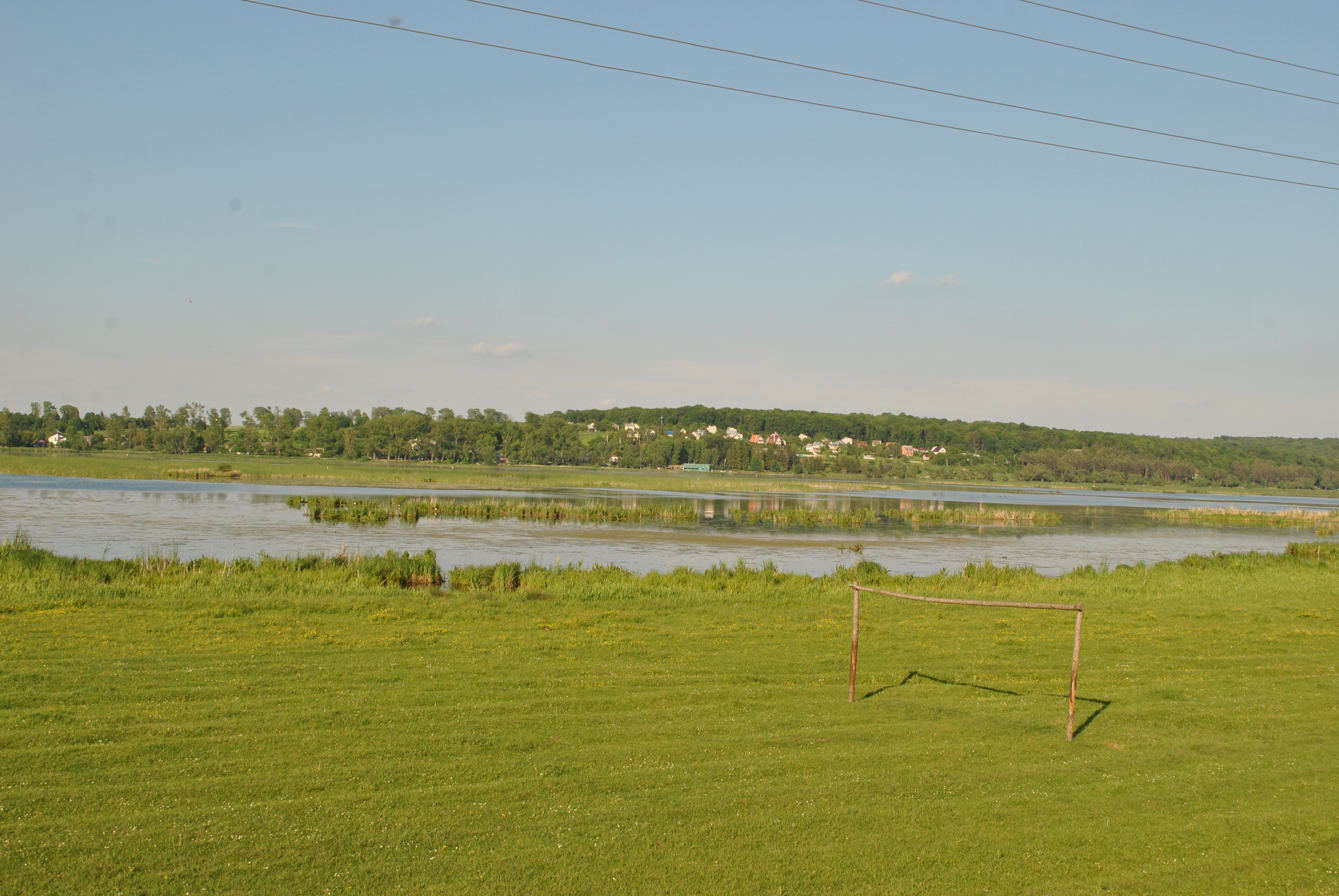
View on Malashivtsi

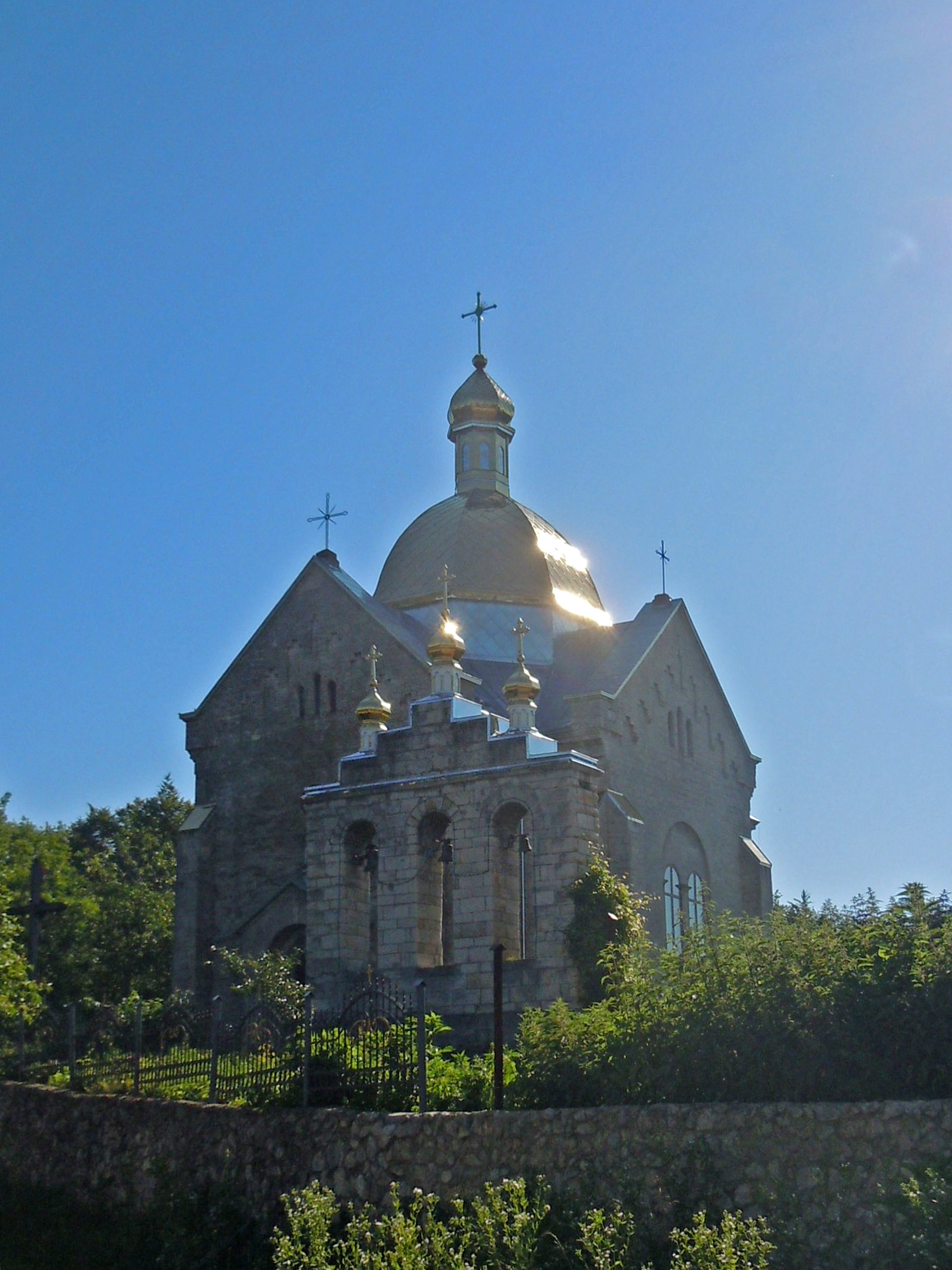
Holy Trinity Church

== Sources ==
- (in Ukrainian) М. Бігус, П. Медведик, Малашівці // Ternopil Encyclopedic Dictionary: in 4 v. / editorial board: H. Yavorskyi and other, Ternopil: "Zbruch", 2005, V. 2: К—О, S. 441. — ISBN 966-528-199-2.
- (in Ukrainian) У. Коропецька. Б. Мельничук, С. Юрик, Малашівці // Ternopil Oblast. History of cities and villages: in 3 v. / Ternopil: "Terno-graph", 2014, V. 2: Г—Л, S. 365-366. — ISBN 978-966-457-228-3.
