= Kobzarivka =

Rural locality in Ternopil Oblast, Ukraine

Kobzarivka Кобзарівка
- Location in Ternopil Oblast
- Coordinates: 49°43′16″N 25°27′40″E
- Country: Ukraine
- Oblast: Ternopil Oblast
- Raion: Ternopil Raion
- Established: 1463

Population (2014)
  - Total: 324
- Time zone: UTC+2 (EET)
  - Summer (DST): UTC+3 (EEST)
- Postal code: 47250
- Area code: +380 3540

Kobzarivka (Ukrainian: Кобзарівка) is a village in Ternopil Raion, Ternopil Oblast (province) of western Ukraine. It was formerly known as Zaruddia. Kobzarivka belongs to Ternopil urban hromada, one of the hromadas of Ukraine.

== History ==
The first written mention is in 1463.

In 1963 the villages of Zaruddia and Obaryntsi were united under the name of Kobzarivka - in honor of Taras Shevchenko.

There is a church of St. Apostle John the Theologian (1906, brick; reconstructed in 2003). The church has been preserved (1910, destroyed during the First World War; rebuilt in 1919).

Near the village there is a botanical natural heritage site Kobzarivska Zozulyntseva area.

Until 18 July 2020, Kobzarivka belonged to Zboriv Raion. The raion was abolished in July 2020 as part of the administrative reform of Ukraine, which reduced the number of raions of Ternopil Oblast to three. The area of Zboriv Raion was merged into Ternopil Raion.

== Population ==
- Population in 2003: 405 inhabitants.
- Population in 2014: 324 inhabitants with over 167 houses.

They were born in Kobzarivka:

- doctor Ihor Dziubanovskyi (b. 1947),
- General Director of ternopil radio plant "Orion", scientist Yaroslav Karpyk (b. 1951).

Studied at Kobzarivka school:

- poet and scientist Oleh Herman (b. 1948),
- local historian, literary critic Havrylo Chernykhivskyi (1936–2011)
