= Ivankivtsi, Ternopil Raion, Ternopil Oblast =

Rural locality in Ternopil Oblast, Ukraine

Ivankivtsi Іванківці
- Location in Ternopil Oblast
- Coordinates: 49°41′56″N 25°28′17″E
- Country: Ukraine
- Oblast: Ternopil Oblast
- Raion: Ternopil Raion
- Established: 1536

Area
  - Total: 1.450 km^{2} (0.560 sq mi)

Population (2014)
  - Total: 321
- Time zone: UTC+2 (EET)
  - Summer (DST): UTC+3 (EEST)
- Postal code: 47251
- Area code: +380 3540

Ivankivtsi (Ukrainian: Іванківці) is a village in Ternopil Raion, Ternopil Oblast (province) of western Ukraine. It belongs to Ternopil urban hromada, one of the hromadas of Ukraine.

Until 18 July 2020, Ivankivtsi belonged to Zboriv Raion. The raion was abolished in July 2020 as part of the administrative reform of Ukraine, which reduced the number of raions of Ternopil Oblast to three. The area of Zboriv Raion was merged into Ternopil Raion.

== Population ==
- Population in 1880: 641 inhabitants.
- Population in 1921: 1119 inhabitants with over 165 houses.
- Population in 2001: 410 inhabitants.
- Population in 2014: 321 inhabitants with over 161 houses.

They were born in Ivankivtsi:

- artist Natalia Basarab (born 1954),
- geologist Butsura (1900–1937),
- military colonels Yevhen Dziubanovskyi and Petro Karpyk,
- Candidate of Technical Sciences, teacher Petro Kryvyi (born in 1943),
- Candidate of Historical Sciences, Professor Bohdan Lanovyk (b. 1936), and his father, public and cooperative figure Dmytro Lanovyk (1900–1983).
