= Kurivtsi =

Rural locality in Ternopil Oblast, Ukraine

Kurivtsi Курівці
- Location in Ternopil Oblast
- Coordinates: 49°38′03″N 25°28′32″E
- Country: Ukraine
- Oblast: Ternopil Oblast
- Raion: Ternopil Raion

Population (2014)
  - Total: 670
- Time zone: UTC+2 (EET)
  - Summer (DST): UTC+3 (EEST)
- Postal code: 47281
- Area code: +380 3540

Kurivtsi (Ukrainian: Курівці) is a village in Ternopil Raion, Ternopil Oblast (province) of western Ukraine. It belongs to Ternopil urban hromada, one of the hromadas of Ukraine.

Until 18 July 2020, Kurivtsi belonged to Zboriv Raion. The raion was abolished in July 2020 as part of the administrative reform of Ukraine, which reduced the number of raions of Ternopil Oblast to three. The area of Zboriv Raion was merged into Ternopil Raion.

== Population ==
- Population in 2014: 670 inhabitants with over 245 houses.

They were born in Kurivtsi:

- actor Mykola Bentsal (b. 1891)
- scientist-epidemiologist Yaroslav Alekseyevych (b. 1935),
- public figures Semen Zahrebelnyi (1900–1963),
- Sofia Nalukova (Kinakh; 1888–1984),
- priest Serhiy Semchyshyn (b. 1974).

== Gallery ==
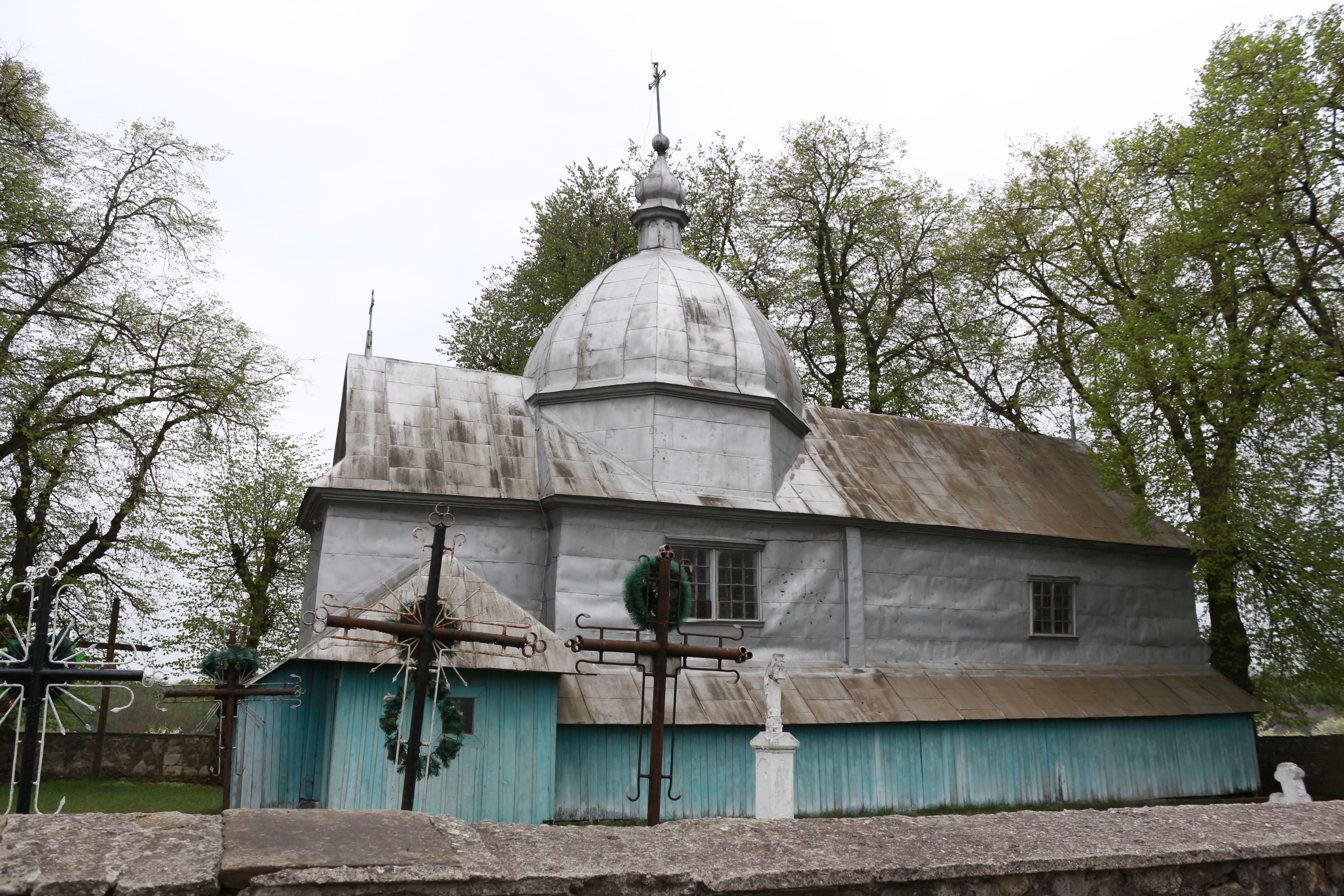
Church of the Ascension

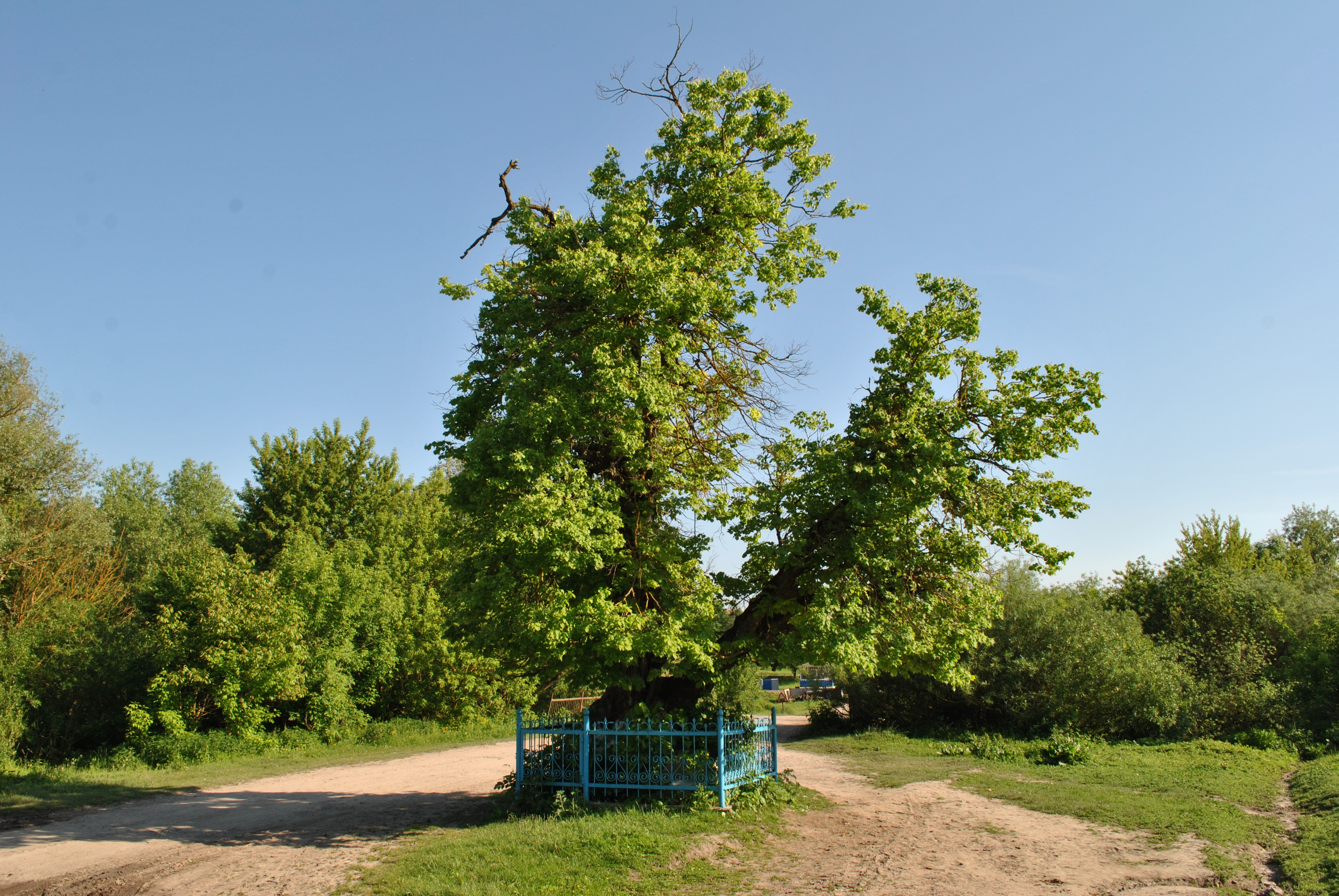
Tilia cordata of Ivan Franko
