= Natalia Basarab =

Ukrainian artist (born 1954)

- Наталя Басараб
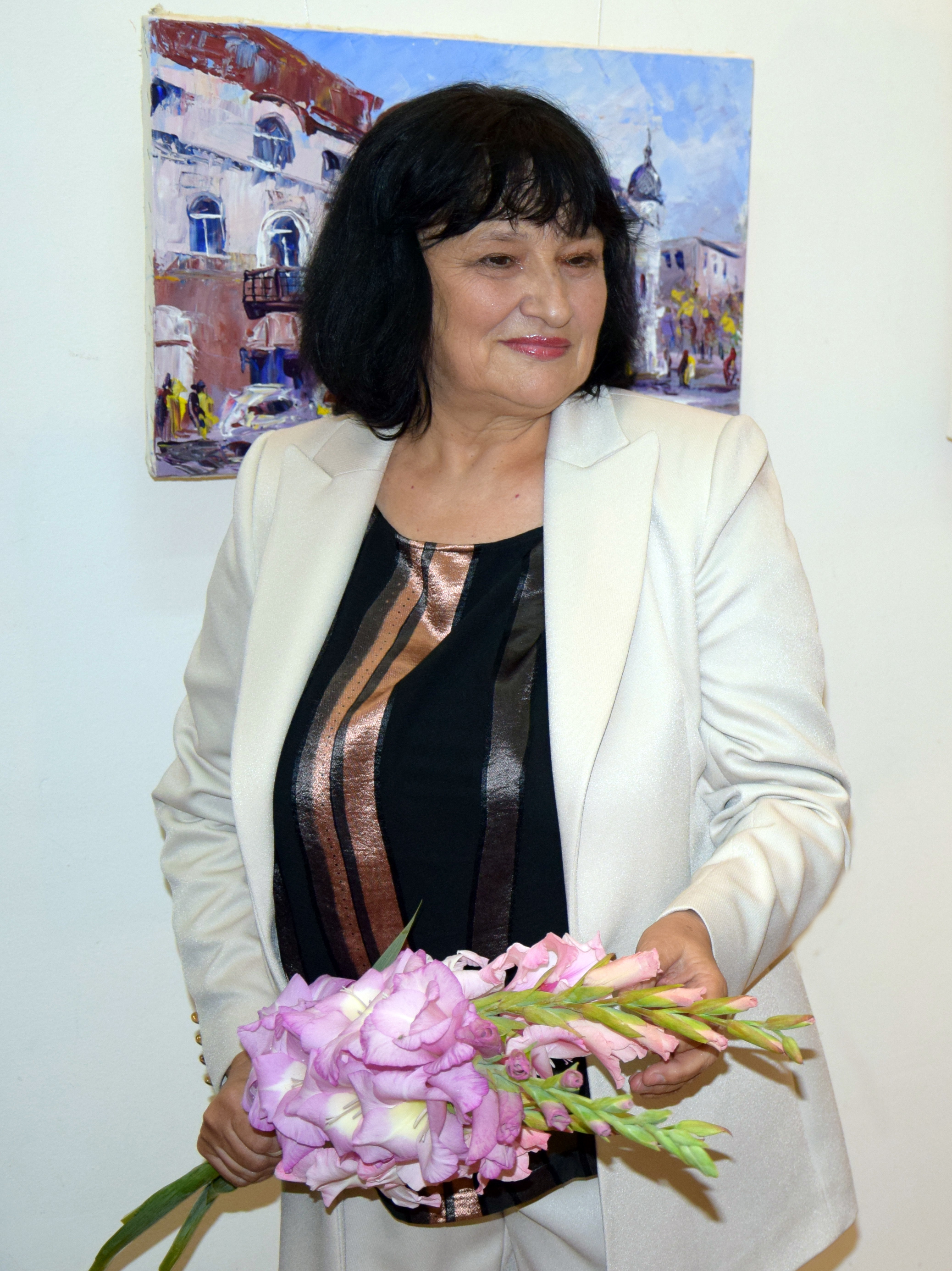
- Born: Natalia Kazymyrivna Basarab; 23 April 1954 (age 72); Ivankivtsi, Ternopil Oblast
- Education: Ternopil Cooperative College

Natalia Kazymyrivna Basarab (Ukrainian: Наталя Казимирівна Басараб; born 23 April 1954 in Ivankivtsi, Ternopil Oblast) is a Ukrainian artist.

== Biography ==
Natalia Basarab was born on 23 April 1954 in Ivankivtsi, now Ternopil Hromada, Ternopil Raion, Ternopil Oblast, Ukraine.

She graduated from the decorative and artistic department of the Ternopil Cooperative College (1975); a significant role in the formation of the artist was played by the lectures of Ihor Duda. She worked as an artist-decorator in the Ternopil Central Department Store (1975–1993), an artist at the Ternopil Secondary School No. 6 (1993).

== Creativity ==
To create her paintings, she uses oil paints, bird feathers, glass and silk painting, and applique; from 1999, she has been making dolls. In 2022, she painted a series of female portraits called "Ukrainian women" (20 paintings).

Participant of art exhibitions from 1975; personal exhibitions in Ternopil (eight from 1994), Kyiv (1998); in France (2001, 2004) and others. In 2013, the artist opened an art salon in her studio apartment.

The works are kept in the Ternopil Regional Museum of Local Lore and Art, private collections in Ukraine, Germany, Poland, Russia, the US, and France.

== Legacy ==
On the occasion of the artist's 70th birthday, a postal envelope with a postage stamp depicting the painting "Molytva" was issued.

== Sources ==
- Микола Шот (2022-06-16). "Малює радість і красу". Uryadovy Kuryer.
