= Vertelka =

Rural locality in Ternopil Oblast, Ukraine

Vertelka Вертелка
- Location in Ternopil Oblast
- Coordinates: 49°44′47″N 25°26′24″E
- Country: Ukraine
- Oblast: Ternopil Oblast
- Raion: Ternopil Hromada
- Established: 1546

Population (2014)
  - Total: 344
- Time zone: UTC+2 (EET)
  - Summer (DST): UTC+3 (EEST)
- Postal code: 47250
- Area code: +380 3540

Vertelka (Ukrainian: Вертелка) is a village in Ternopil Raion in Ternopil Oblast (province) of western Ukraine. It belongs to Ternopil urban hromada, one of the hromadas of Ukraine.

The khutors of Dubyna, Zaboloto and Zahrebellia belong to the village. Located on the left bank of the Seret.

== History ==
The first written mention is in 1546, later mentioned in 1724.

There is a church of St. Great Martyr Yuriy (1920; reconstructed in 1992), cross in honor of the abolition of serfdom (restored in 1991).

Until 18 July 2020, Vertelka belonged to Zboriv Raion. The raion was abolished in July 2020 as part of the administrative reform of Ukraine, which reduced the number of raions of Ternopil Oblast to three. The area of Zboriv Raion was merged into Ternopil Raion.

== Population ==
- Population in 2003: 377 inhabitants.
- Population in 2014: 344 inhabitants with over 110 houses.

== Gallery ==
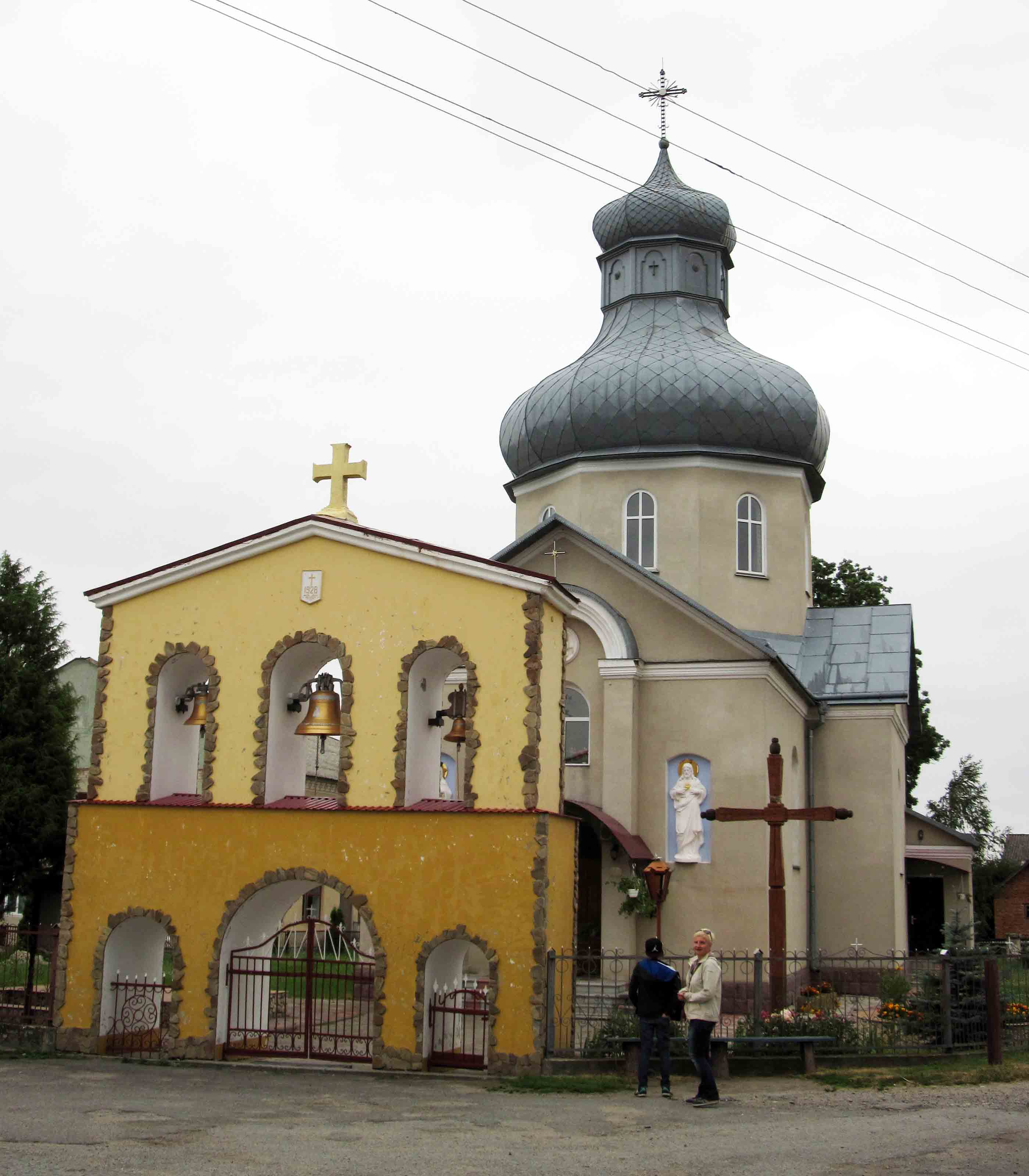
Church of St. Great Martyr Yuriy

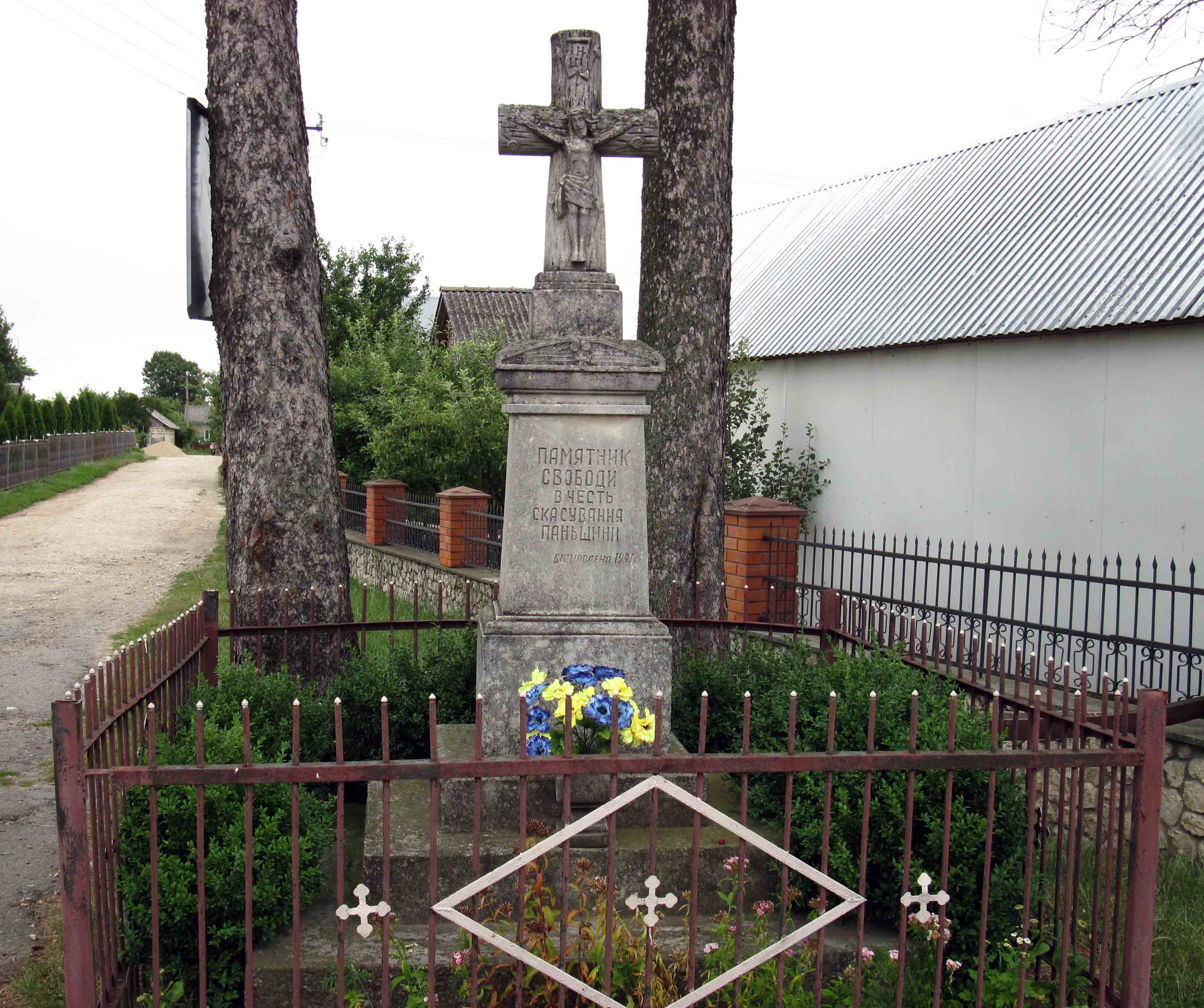
Cross in honor of the abolition of serfdom
