= Horodyshche, Ternopil urban hromada, Ternopil Raion, Ternopil Oblast =

Rural locality in Ternopil Oblast, Ukraine

Horodyshche Городище
- Location in Ternopil Oblast Horodyshche (Ternopil Oblast)
- Coordinates: 49°43′52″N 25°25′27″E
- Country: Ukraine
- Oblast: Ternopil Oblast
- Raion: Ternopil Raion
- Established: 1564

Population (2014)
  - Total: 112
- Time zone: UTC+2 (EET)
  - Summer (DST): UTC+3 (EEST)
- Postal code: 47237
- Area code: +380 3540

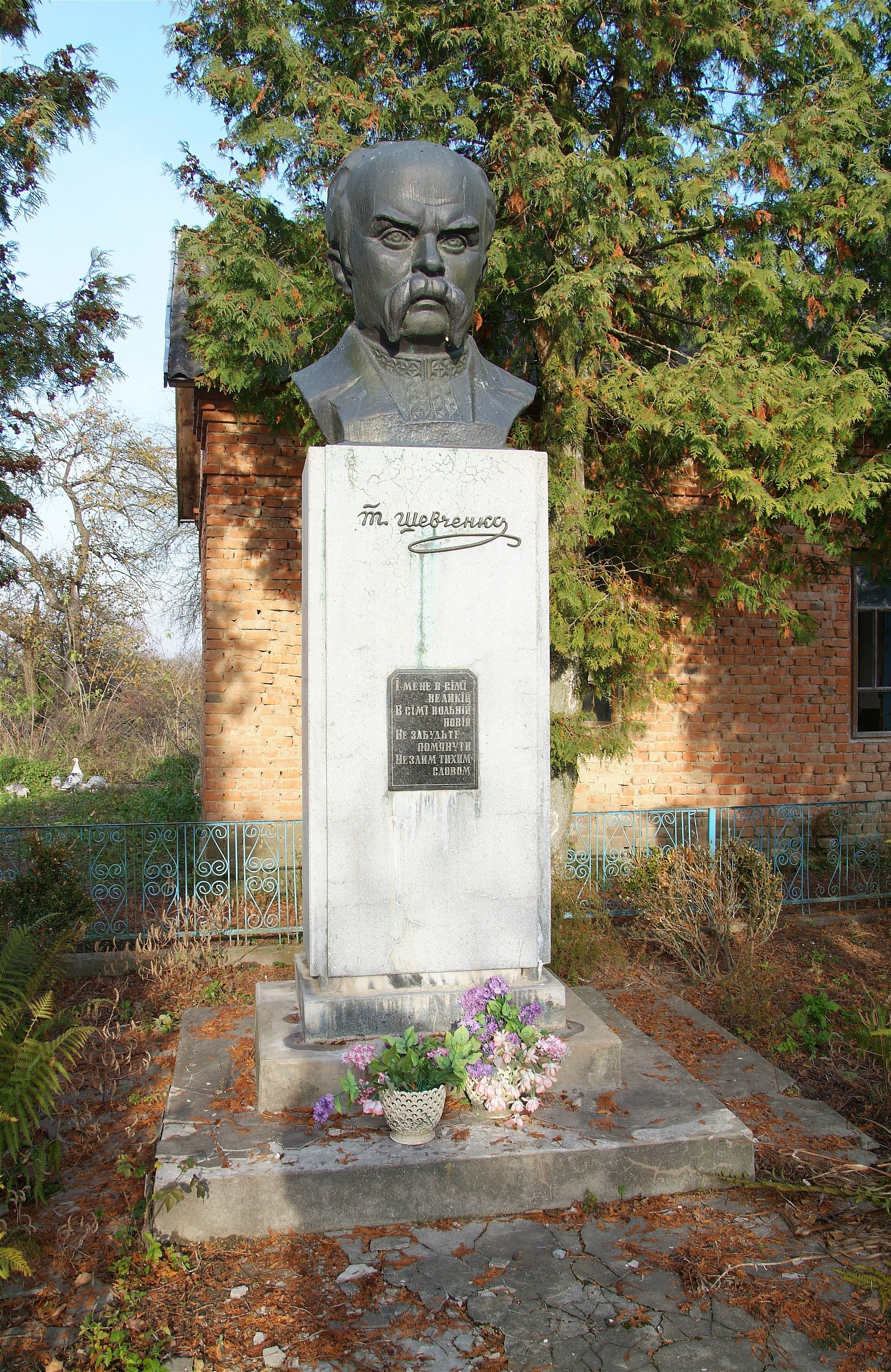
Monument to Taras Shevchenko

Horodyshche (Ukrainian: Городище) is a village in Ternopil Raion, Ternopil Oblast (province) of western Ukraine. It belongs to Ternopil urban hromada, one of the hromadas of Ukraine.

== History ==
The village church dates back to 1906, and the Parish is named the Assumption of Mary.

During 1939–1962, the village was administratively located in Velykyi Hlybochok Raion, and during 1963–2018, it was in Zboriv Raion, and also designated Center of the Horodyshche Rural Council.

As part of the 2020 administrative reform of Ukraine, the number of raions in Ternopil Oblast was reduced to just three. As a result, on 18 July 2020, Zboriv Raion was abolished, and its territory merged in with Ternopil Raion.

== Population ==
- Population in 1880: 510 inhabitants.
- Population in 1910: 656 inhabitants.
- Population in 1931: 536 inhabitants.
- Population in 1970: 336 inhabitants with over 115 houses.
- Population in 2003: 129 inhabitants.
- Population in 2014: 112 inhabitants with over 89 houses.

They were born in Horodyshche:

- painter Yevstakhiy Biliavskyi (d. 1804),
- UGA officer Mykola Mazurevych (1895–1937),
- teacher Bohdan Shyliha (b. 1946),
- mechanical engineer of the food industry, teacher Maria Shynkaryk (b. 1954),
- engineer-geologist Petro Shynkaryk (1929–1995),
- ex-head of the main department of agro-industrial development of Ternopil Oblast State Administration Andrii Khoma (b. 1951).

Lived the priest, writer Tymofiy Borduliak (1863–1936).
