= Chernykhiv, Ternopil Oblast =

Rural locality in Ternopil Oblast, Ukraine

Chernykhiv Чернихів
- Location in Ternopil Oblast Chernykhiv (Ukraine)
- Coordinates: 49°41′42″N 25°26′47″E
- Country: Ukraine
- Oblast: Ternopil Oblast
- Raion: Ternopil Raion

Population (2014)
  - Total: 390
- Time zone: UTC+2 (EET)
  - Summer (DST): UTC+3 (EEST)
- Postal code: 47251
- Area code: +380 3540

Chernykhiv (Ukrainian: Чернихів) is a village in Ternopil Raion, Ternopil Oblast (province) of western Ukraine. It belongs to Ternopil urban hromada, one of the hromadas of Ukraine.

Until 18 July 2020, Chernykhiv belonged to Zboriv Raion. The raion was abolished in July 2020 as part of the administrative reform of Ukraine, which reduced the number of raions of Ternopil Oblast to three. The area of Zboriv Raion was merged into Ternopil Raion.

== History ==
The village was first mentioned in written sources in 1213 as Cherneche (Ukrainian: Чернече). According to the encyclopedia "Ternopil Region: History of Cities and Villages", the name of the village most likely comes from the word chernets (Ukrainian: чернець), meaning monk, and was named after a monk from Great Ukraine who lived in a cave near the village.

By 1672, 25 families lived in Chernykhiv, and by 1700 that number had increased to 30.

On 25 May 1908, the village was the site of the so-called "Chernykhiv tragedy". At the time, peasants were forbidden from fishing or using the water of the Seret River for any purpose. After the arrest of a woman who had been washing clothes in the river, peasants armed with hoes and clubs gathered at the mayor's house. Five villagers were killed and seven wounded.

Branches of the organizations Prosvita, Sich, Luh, Sokil, Ukrainian Women's Union, and Ridna Shkola were active in the village.

Residents of the village who served in the Ukrainian Galician Army included Vasyl Baran, Dmytro Borovych, Dmytro Herman, Hryhorii Kmet, Yakiv Kosovskyi, Stepan Kukharskyi, Luka Prokopiv, Dmytro Tataryn, Illia Tymochko, Luka Tymochko, Vasyl Shagadyn, and Mykhailo Shagadyn.

22 residents of the village died while serving in World War II, and 15 went missing.

== Population ==
- Population in 2007: 416 inhabitants.
- Population in 2014: 390 inhabitants with over 221 houses.

They were born in the village

- priest, folklorist, historian Petro Bilynskyi (b. 1846),
- writer, scientist, public figure Oleh Herman (b. 1948),
- public figure of the Ukrainian diaspora in the United States Petro Hlynskyi (b. 1917),
- poets Ivan Holub (1917–2001), Vasyl Karachok (b. 1870),
- entrepreneur, florist, breeder Ihor Khorosh (b. 1967),
- painter, sculptor Volodymyr Kosovskyi (b. 1929),
- teacher, writer, ethnographer Yakiv Kosovskyi (1899-1975);
- architect and public and cultural figure of the Ukrainian diaspora in Australia Roman Pavlyshyn (b. 1922),
- literary critic Liubomyr Senyk (b. 1930),
- public and political figure, teacher Bohdan Tymochko (b. 1926),
- scientist in the field of physics and mathematics, teacher, public figure Oleh Shabliy (b. 1935).
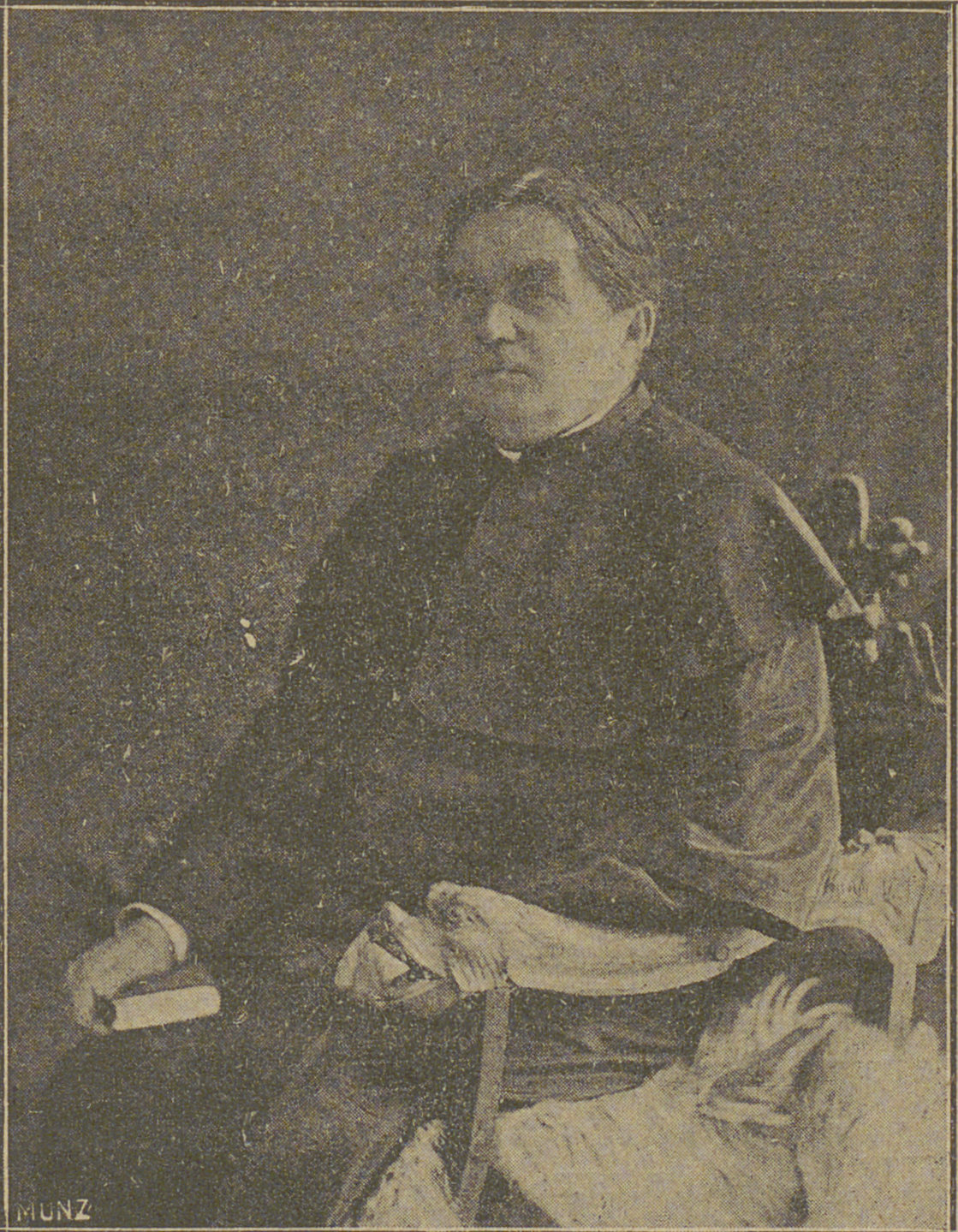
Petro Bilynskyi

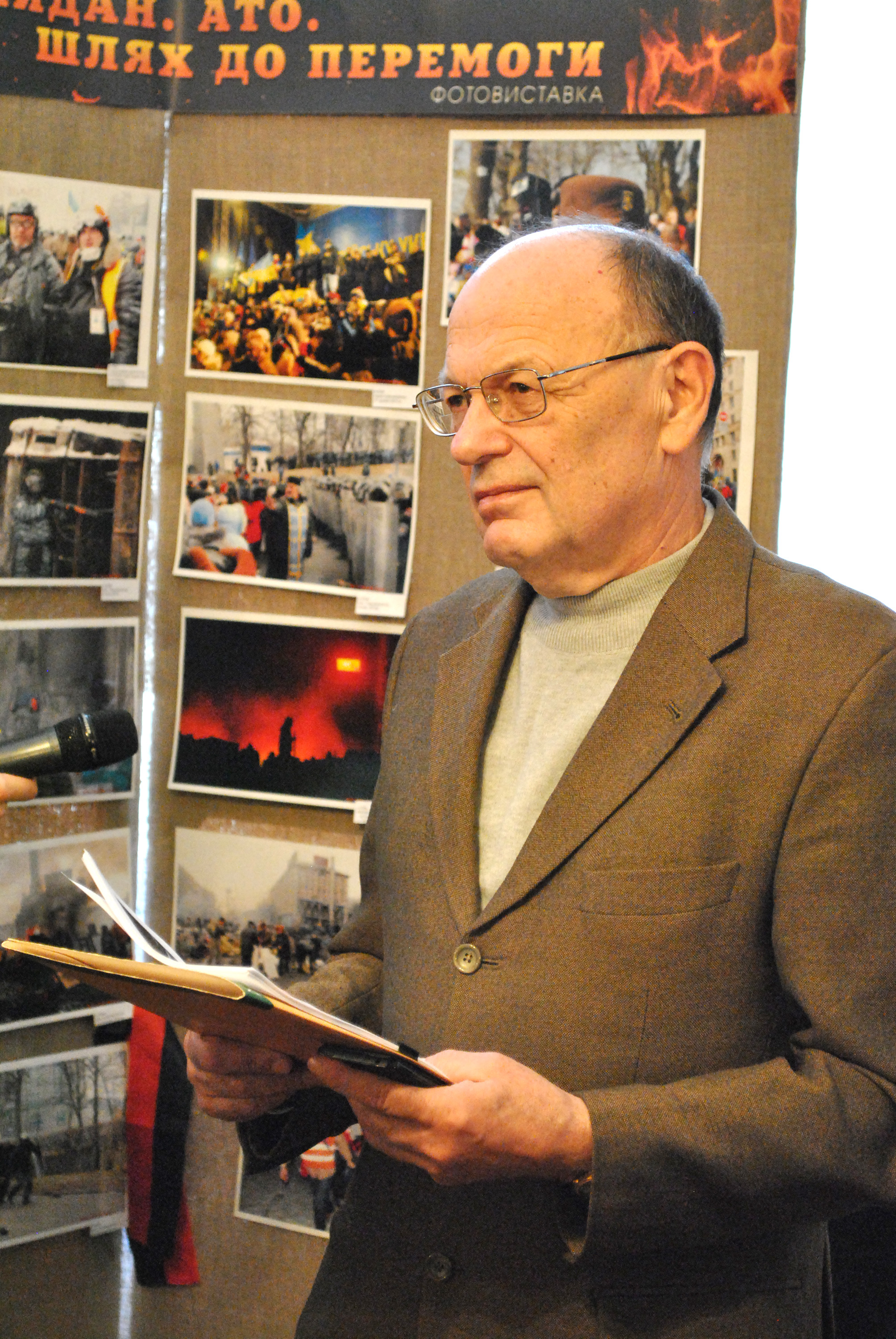
Oleh Herman
