= Ternopil urban hromada =

Hromada in Ternopil Oblast, Ukraine

Ternopil urban hromada Тернопільська міська громада
- hromada
- Seal

- Location within Ternopil Oblast Location within Ukraine
- Coordinates: 49°34′N 25°36′E
- Country: Ukraine
- Oblast (province): Ternopil
- Raion (district): Ternopil
- Administrative center: Ternopil

Government
  - Hromada head: Serhiy Nadal

Area
  - Total: 167.9 km^{2} (64.8 sq mi)

Population (2022)
  - Total: 227,619
- Cities: 1
- Villages: 10
- Website: ternopilcity.gov.ua

Ternopil urban hromada (Ukrainian: Тернопільська міська громада, romanized: Ternopilska miska hromada) is a hromada of Ukraine, in Ternopil Raion of Ternopil Oblast. Its administrative center is Ternopil. Population: 227,619 (2022 estimate)

== History ==
The amalgamated hromada was created 14 November 2018 by uniting 5 rural councils — Kobzarivka (villages Kobzarivka, Vertelka), Kurivtsi (village Kurivtsi), Malashivtsi (villages Malashivtsi, Ivankivtsi) and Chernykhiv (villages Chernykhiv, Hliadky, Pleskivtsi) of Zboriv Raion with Ternopil city council (city of regional significance).

On 7 February 2020, by the decision of the session of the Ternopil City Council, another community of Zboriv Raion was added to the Ternopil Hromada — Horodyshche Rural Council (v. Horodyshche and Nosivtsi).

Ternopil became first among all regional (oblast) administrative centers that created amalgamated hromada. Until 18 July 2020, Ternopil was designated as a city of oblast significance. As part of the administrative reform of Ukraine, which reduced the number of raions of Ternopil Oblast to three, the city and the hromada were merged into Ternopil Raion.

== Settlements ==
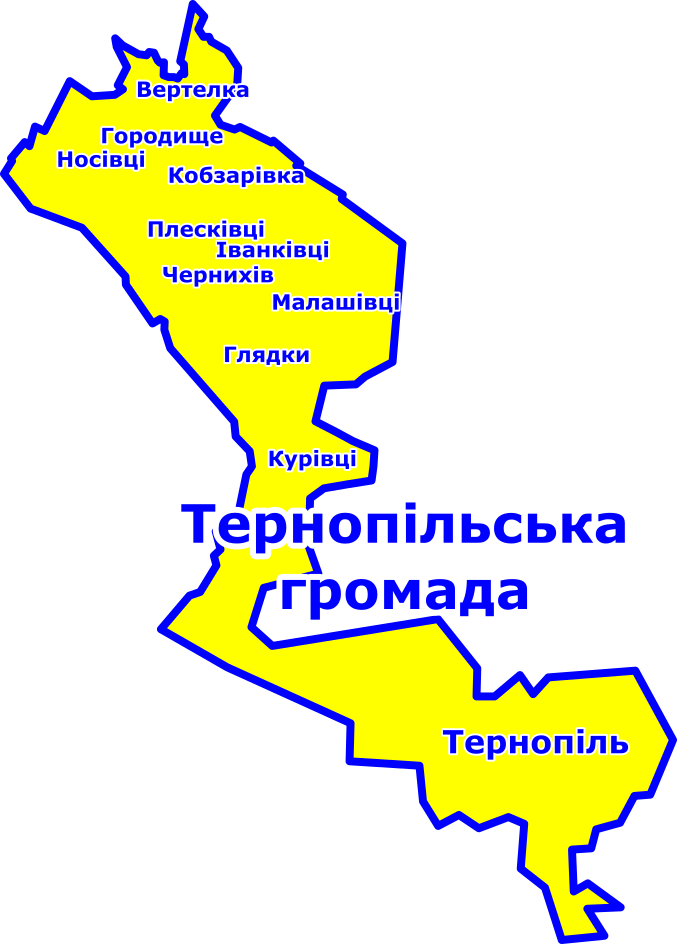
Map of Ternopil Hromada

In addition to one city (Ternopil), the hromada is home to the following 10 villages:

- Chernykhiv
- Hliadky
- Horodyshche
- Ivankivtsi
- Kobzarivka
- Kurivtsi
- Malashivtsi
- Pleskivtsi
- Nosivtsi
- Vertelka

== Leader ==
- Serhiy Nadal — the mayor of Ternopil, the head of the hromada
