= Battle of Ustechko =

1694 battle

- Part of Great Turkish War and Polish–Ottoman War
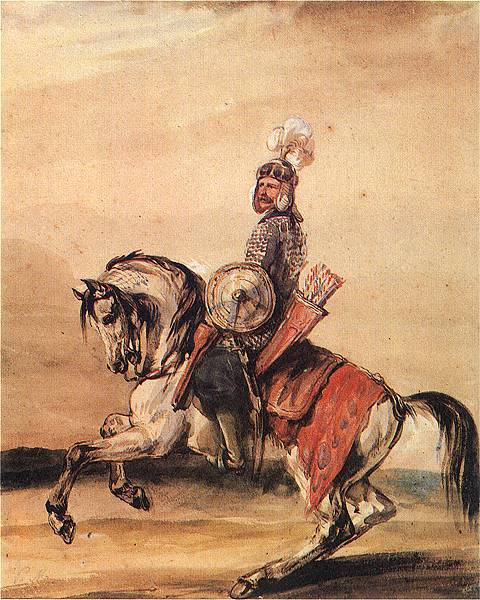
- Stanisław Jan Jabłonowski
Date	October 6, 1694
Location	Ustechko, (today Ukraine)
Result	Polish–Lithuanian victory

Belligerents
Polish–Lithuanian Commonwealth	Khanate of Crimea; Ottoman Empire

Commanders and leaders
Stanisław Jan Jabłonowski; Kazimierz Jan Sapieha	Şehbaz Giray

Strength
2,000–3,000; 12 guns	8,000–10,000 Tatars; 2,000 Turks

Casualties and losses
Unknown	Unknown

The Battle of Ustechko (Polish: Uścieczko, Turkish: Yuvaniça) (October 6, 1694) was fought during the Polish–Ottoman War (1683–1699), between the armies of the Polish–Lithuanian Commonwealth on the one hand and of Khanate of Crimea and Ottoman Empire on the other. Polish–Lithuanian Commonwealth forces under the command of Stanisław Jan Jabłonowski defeated the Tatars and Ottomans forces commanded by Şehbaz Giray.
