= Zina Kushniruk =

Ukrainian journalist (born 1962)

- Зіна Антонівна Кушнірук
- Born: 5 January 1962 (age 64); Velyki Viknyny, now Vyshnivets settlement hromada, Kremenets Raion, Ternopil Oblast, Ukraine
- Education: Ternopil Pedagogical Institute
- Awards: Honored Journalist of Ukraine

Zina Antonovna Kushniruk (Ukrainian: Зіна Антонівна Кушнірук; born 5 January 1962 in Velyki Viknyny, Ternopil Oblast) is a Ukrainian journalist and editor. Honored Journalist of Ukraine (2003).

== Biography ==
She graduated from the Faculty of Philology of the Ternopil Pedagogical Institute (1983).

In 1984–1995, in the editorial office of the regional newspaper "Vilne zhyttia". Since 1995 – columnist, head of the editorial department of the newspaper "Svoboda", the leading page of the "Hnizdechko". In September 2007 – 2013 – editor of the newspaper "Svoboda". Since 2013, he has been the editor-in-chief of the "Nash Den" newspaper.

Own correspondent of the medical newspaper of Ukraine, "Vashe Zdorovia". Author of numerous publications in all-Ukrainian publications.

== Sources ==
- (in Ukrainian) Григорій Грещук, Кушнірук Зіна Антонівна // Ternopil Encyclopedic Dictionary: in 4 v. / editorial board: H. Yavorskyi and other, Ternopil: "Zbruch", 2005, V. 2: К—О, S. 307–308. — ISBN 966-528-199-2.
