= Bodaky =

Rural locality in Ternopil Oblast, Ukraine

Bodaky Бодаки
- Location in Ternopil Oblast
- Coordinates: 49°53′36″N 25°48′25″E
- Country: Ukraine
- Oblast: Ternopil Oblast
- Raion: Kremenets Raion
- Hromada: Vyshnivets settlement hromada
- Time zone: UTC+2 (EET)
  - Summer (DST): UTC+3 (EEST)
- Postal code: 47323

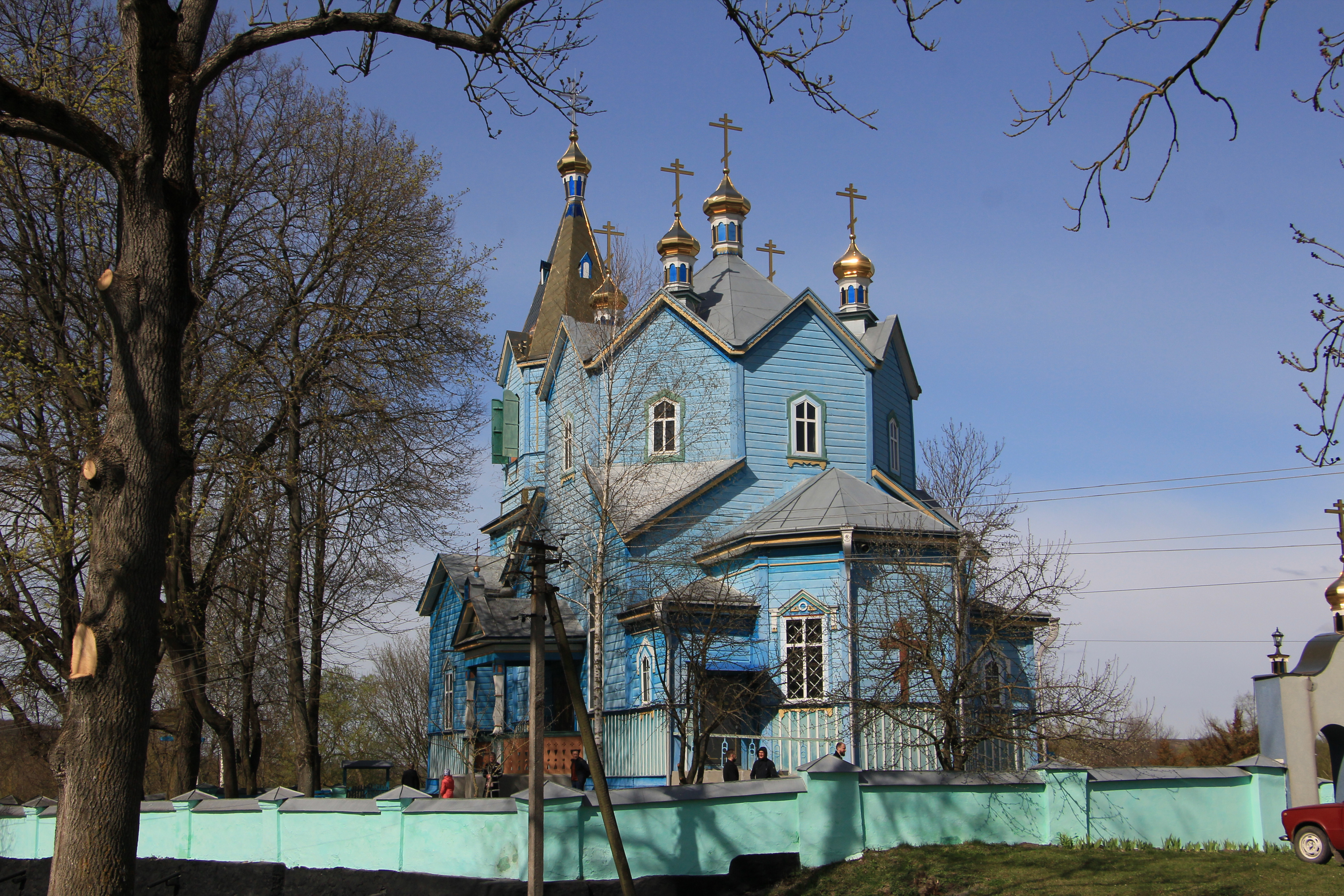
Wooden church in the village of Bodaki, Zbarazh district, Ternopil region

Bodaky (Ukrainian: Бодаки) is a village in the Vyshnivets settlement hromada of the Kremenets Raion of Ternopil Oblast in Ukraine. After the liquidation of the Zbarazh Raion on 19 July 2020, the village became part of the Kremenets Raion.

== Bibliography ==
- "Bodaki (2)". Geographical Dictionary of the Kingdom of Poland (in Polish). p. 176.
