= Kokhanivka, Ternopil Oblast =

Rural locality in Ternopil Oblast, Ukraine

Kokhanivka Коханівка
- Location in Ternopil Oblast
- Coordinates: 49°49′50″N 25°49′46″E
- Country: Ukraine
- Oblast: Ternopil Oblast
- Raion: Kremenets Raion
- Hromada: Vyshnivets settlement hromada
- Time zone: UTC+2 (EET)
  - Summer (DST): UTC+3 (EEST)
- Postal code: 47331

Kokhanivka (Ukrainian: Коханівка) is a village in the Vyshnivets settlement hromada of the Kremenets Raion of Ternopil Oblast in Ukraine.

== History ==
The first written mention of the village was in 1482.

After the liquidation of the Zbarazh Raion on 19 July 2020, the village became part of the Kremenets Raion.

== Religion ==
- Church of the Intercession (2011, brick).

== Sources ==
- (in Ukrainian) Онищук Г., Ханас В., Коханівка // Ternopil Encyclopedic Dictionary: in 4 v. / editorial board: H. Yavorskyi and other, Ternopil: "Zbruch", 2005, V. 2: К—О, S. 204. — ISBN 966-528-199-2.
- "Kochanówka (4)". Geographical Dictionary of the Kingdom of Poland (in Polish). p. 97.
