= Zalistsi, Vyshnivets settlement hromada, Kremenets Raion, Ternopil Oblast =

Rural locality in Ternopil Oblast, Ukraine

Zalistsi Залісці
- Location in Ternopil Oblast
- Coordinates: 49°57′57″N 25°38′57″E
- Country: Ukraine
- Oblast: Ternopil Oblast
- Raion: Kremenets Raion
- Hromada: Vyshnivets settlement hromada
- Time zone: UTC+2 (EET)
  - Summer (DST): UTC+3 (EEST)
- Postal code: 47310

Zalistsi (Ukrainian: Залісці) is a village in the Vyshnivets settlement hromada of the Kremenets Raion of Ternopil Oblast in Ukraine. After the liquidation of the Zbarazh Raion on 19 July 2020, the village became part of the Kremenets Raion.

== Bibliography ==
- "Zaleśce 4.) Wiśniowieckie". Geographical Dictionary of the Kingdom of Poland (in Polish). 14. Warszawa: Kasa im. Józefa Mianowskiego. 1895. p. 329.
