= Dibrova, Vyshnivets settlement hromada, Kremenets Raion, Ternopil Oblast =

Rural locality in Ternopil Oblast, Ukraine

Dibrova Діброва
- Location in Ternopil Oblast
- Coordinates: 49°49′8″N 25°47′38″E
- Country: Ukraine
- Oblast: Ternopil Oblast
- Raion: Kremenets Raion
- Hromada: Vyshnivets settlement hromada
- Time zone: UTC+2 (EET)
  - Summer (DST): UTC+3 (EEST)
- Postal code: 47331

Dibrova (Ukrainian: Діброва) is a village in the Vyshnivets settlement hromada of the Kremenets Raion of Ternopil Oblast in Ukraine. After the liquidation of the Zbarazh Raion on 19 July 2020, the village became part of the Kremenets Raion.

== Bibliography ==
- (in Ukrainian) Онищук Г., Діброва // Ternopil Encyclopedic Dictionary: in 4 v. / editorial board: H. Yavorskyi and other, Ternopil: "Zbruch", 2004, V. 1: А—Й, S. 498. — ISBN 966-528-197-6.
