= Velykyi Kunynets =

Rural locality in Ternopil Oblast, Ukraine

Velykyi Kunynets Великий Кунинець
- Location in Ternopil Oblast
- Coordinates: 49°57′22″N 25°44′37″E
- Country: Ukraine
- Oblast: Ternopil Oblast
- Raion: Kremenets Raion
- Hromada: Vyshnivets settlement hromada
- Time zone: UTC+2 (EET)
  - Summer (DST): UTC+3 (EEST)
- Postal code: 47311

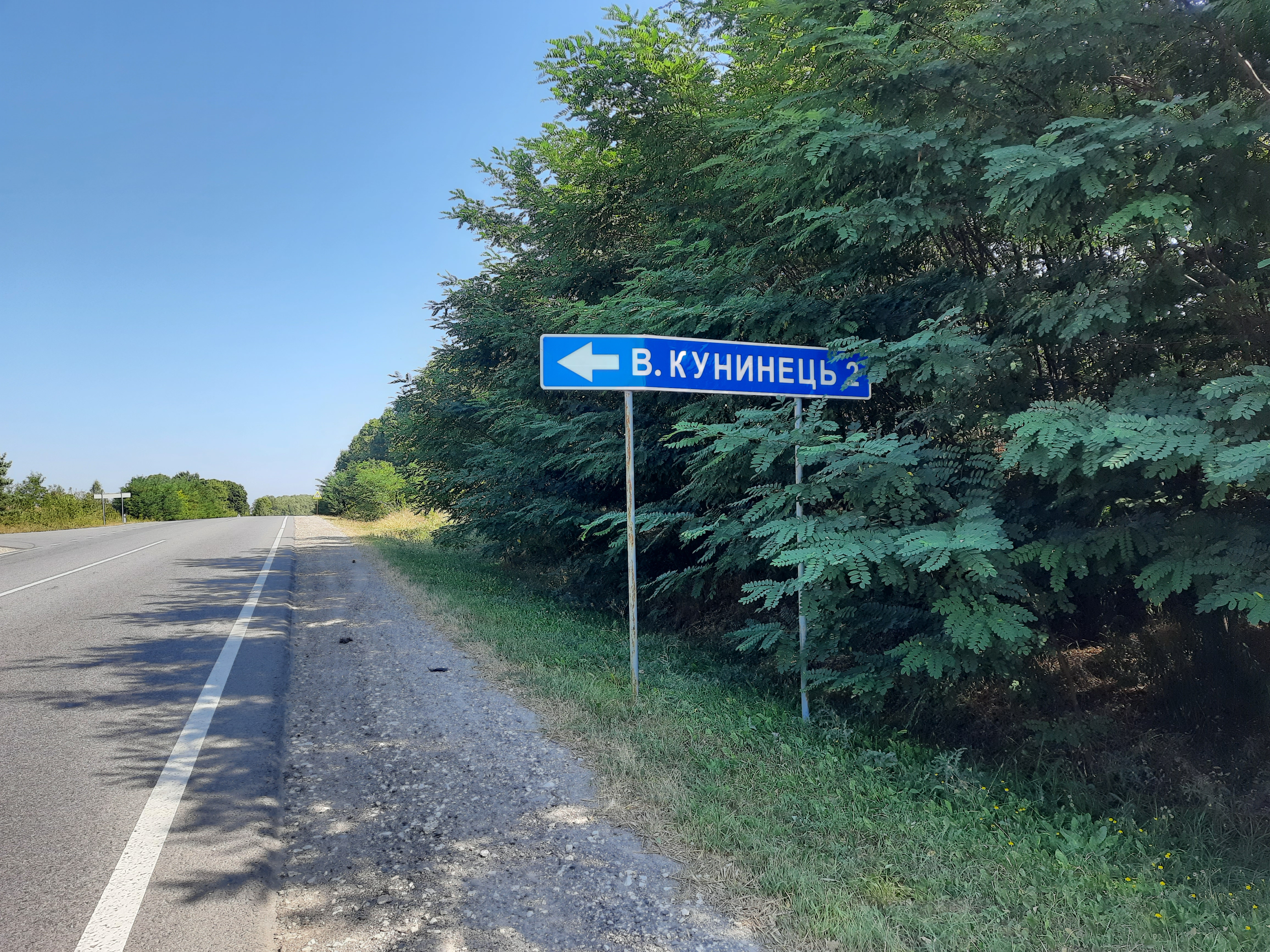
Road sign at the turn to the village of Velykyi Kunynets

Velykyi Kunynets (Ukrainian: Великий Кунинець) is a village in the Vyshnivets settlement hromada of the Kremenets Raion of Ternopil Oblast in Ukraine. After the liquidation of the Zbarazh Raion on 19 July 2020, the village became part of the Kremenets Raion.

== Bibliography ==
- "Kuniniec". Geographical Dictionary of the Kingdom of Poland (in Polish). p. 195.
