= Kryvchyky =

Rural locality in Ternopil Oblast, Ukraine

Kryvchyky Кривчики
- Location in Ternopil Oblast
- Coordinates: 49°55′22″N 25°47′57″E
- Country: Ukraine
- Oblast: Ternopil Oblast
- Raion: Kremenets Raion
- Hromada: Vyshnivets settlement hromada
- Time zone: UTC+2 (EET)
  - Summer (DST): UTC+3 (EEST)
- Postal code: 47315

Kryvchyky (Ukrainian: Кривчики) is a village in the Vyshnivets settlement hromada of the Kremenets Raion of Ternopil Oblast in Ukraine.

== History ==
The first written mention of the village was in 1525.

After the liquidation of the Zbarazh Raion on 19 July 2020, the village became part of the Kremenets Raion.

== Religion ==
- Saints Peter and Paul church

== Bibliography ==
- "Krzywczyki (1)". Geographical Dictionary of the Kingdom of Poland (in Polish). p. 182.
