= Butyn, Ukraine =

Rural locality in Ternopil Oblast, Ukraine

Butyn
- Village
- Location within Ternopil Oblast Location within Ukraine
- Country: Ukraine
- Oblast: Ternopil Oblast
- Raion: Kremenets Raion
- Population (2001 census): 608

Butyn (Ukrainian: Бутин) is a Ukrainian village in Kremenets Raion (district) of Ternopil Oblast (province). It belongs to Vyshnivets settlement hromada, one of the hromadas of Ukraine.

Until 18 July 2020, Butyn belonged to Zbarazh Raion. The raion was abolished in July 2020 as part of the administrative reform of Ukraine, which reduced the number of raions of Ternopil Oblast to three. The area of Zbarazh Raion was split between Kremenets and Ternopil Raions, with Butyn being transferred to Kremenets Raion.
