= Poliany, Ternopil Oblast =

Rural locality in Ternopil Oblast, Ukraine

Poliany Поляни
- Location in Ternopil Oblast
- Coordinates: 49°52′14″N 25°39′59″E
- Country: Ukraine
- Oblast: Ternopil Oblast
- Raion: Kremenets Raion
- Hromada: Vyshnivets settlement hromada
- Time zone: UTC+2 (EET)
  - Summer (DST): UTC+3 (EEST)
- Postal code: 47315

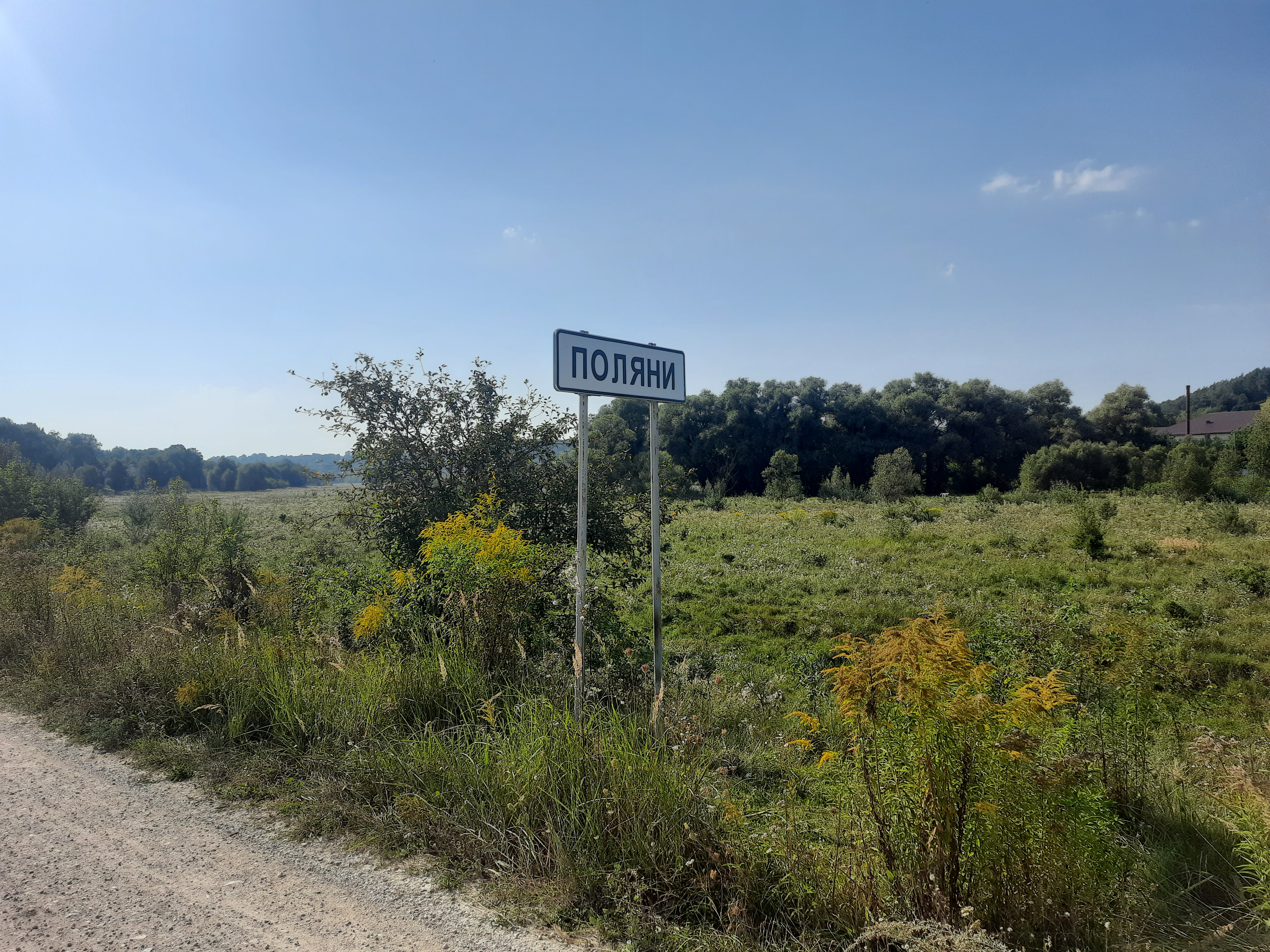
Road sign at the entrance to the village of Polyany Kremenetsk district, Ternopil region

Poliany (Ukrainian: Поляни) is a village in the Vyshnivets settlement hromada of the Kremenets Raion of Ternopil Oblast in Ukraine. After the liquidation of the Zbarazh Raion on 19 July 2020, the village became part of the Kremenets Raion.

== Bibliography ==
- (in Ukrainian) Головатюк В., Поляни // Ternopil Encyclopedic Dictionary: in 4 v. / editorial board: H. Yavorskyi and other, Ternopil: "Zbruch", 2008, V. 3: П—Я, S. 114. — ISBN 978-966-528-279-2.
- (in Ukrainian) Уніят В., Поляни // Ternopil Oblast. History of cities and villages: in 3 v. / Ternopil: "Terno-graph", 2014, V. 2: Г—Л, S. 293. — ISBN 978-966-457-228-3.
