= Kynakhivtsi =

Rural locality in Ternopil Oblast, Ukraine

Kynakhivtsi Кинахівці
- Location in Ternopil Oblast
- Coordinates: 49°52′18″N 25°41′54″E
- Country: Ukraine
- Oblast: Ternopil Oblast
- Raion: Kremenets Raion
- Hromada: Vyshnivets settlement hromada
- Time zone: UTC+2 (EET)
  - Summer (DST): UTC+3 (EEST)
- Postal code: 47315

Kynakhivtsi (Ukrainian: Кинахівці) is a village in the Vyshnivets settlement hromada of the Kremenets Raion of Ternopil Oblast in Ukraine. After the liquidation of the Zbarazh Raion on 19 July 2020, the village became part of the Kremenets Raion.

== Bibliography ==
- "Knichowce". Geographical Dictionary of the Kingdom of Poland (in Polish). p. 93.
