= Malyi Kunynets =

Rural locality in Ternopil Oblast, Ukraine

Malyi Kunynets Малий Кунинець
- Location in Ternopil Oblast
- Coordinates: 49°58′16″N 25°41′54″E
- Country: Ukraine
- Oblast: Ternopil Oblast
- Raion: Kremenets Raion
- Hromada: Vyshnivets settlement hromada
- Time zone: UTC+2 (EET)
  - Summer (DST): UTC+3 (EEST)
- Postal code: 47311

Malyi Kunynets (Ukrainian: Малий Кунинець) is a village in the Vyshnivets settlement hromada of the Kremenets Raion of Ternopil Oblast in Ukraine.

== History ==
The first written mention of the village was in 1545.

After the liquidation of the Zbarazh Raion on 19 July 2020, the village became part of the Kremenets Raion.
