= Khotovytsia =

Rural locality in Ternopil Oblast, Ukraine

Khotovytsia Хотовиця
- Location in Ternopil Oblast
- Coordinates: 49°52′49″N 25°37′26″E
- Country: Ukraine
- Oblast: Ternopil Oblast
- Raion: Kremenets Raion
- Hromada: Vyshnivets settlement hromada
- Time zone: UTC+2 (EET)
  - Summer (DST): UTC+3 (EEST)
- Postal code: 47061

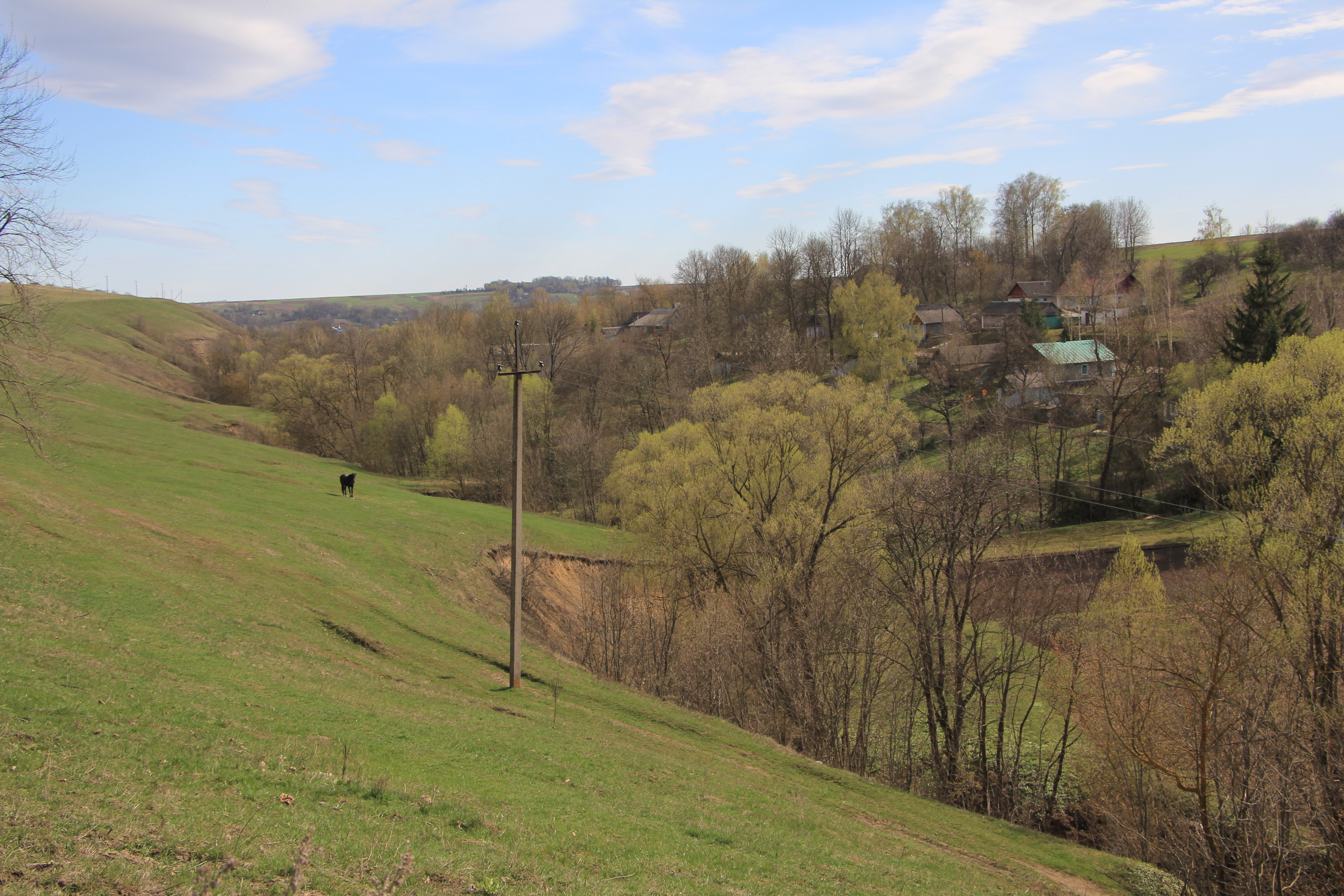
View of the village of Khotovytsia from the church yard

Khotovytsia (Ukrainian: Хотовиця) is a village in the Vyshnivets settlement hromada of the Kremenets Raion of Ternopil Oblast in Ukraine. After the liquidation of the Zbarazh Raion on 19 July 2020, the village became part of the Kremenets Raion.

== Bibliography ==
- (in Ukrainian) Хаварівський Б., Хотовиця // Ternopil Encyclopedic Dictionary: in 4 v. / editorial board: H. Yavorskyi and other, Ternopil: "Zbruch", 2008, V. 3: П—Я, S. 562. — ISBN 978-966-528-279-2.
- "Chotowica". Geographical Dictionary of the Kingdom of Poland (in Polish). p. 325.
