= Ustechko =

Ustechko (Ukrainian: Устечко) is a name of several populated places in Ukraine:

- Ustechko, Chortkiv Raion, Ternopil Oblast
- Ustechko, Kremenets Raion, Ternopil Oblast
