= Ocheretne =

Rural locality in Ternopil Oblast, Ukraine

Ocheretne Очеретне
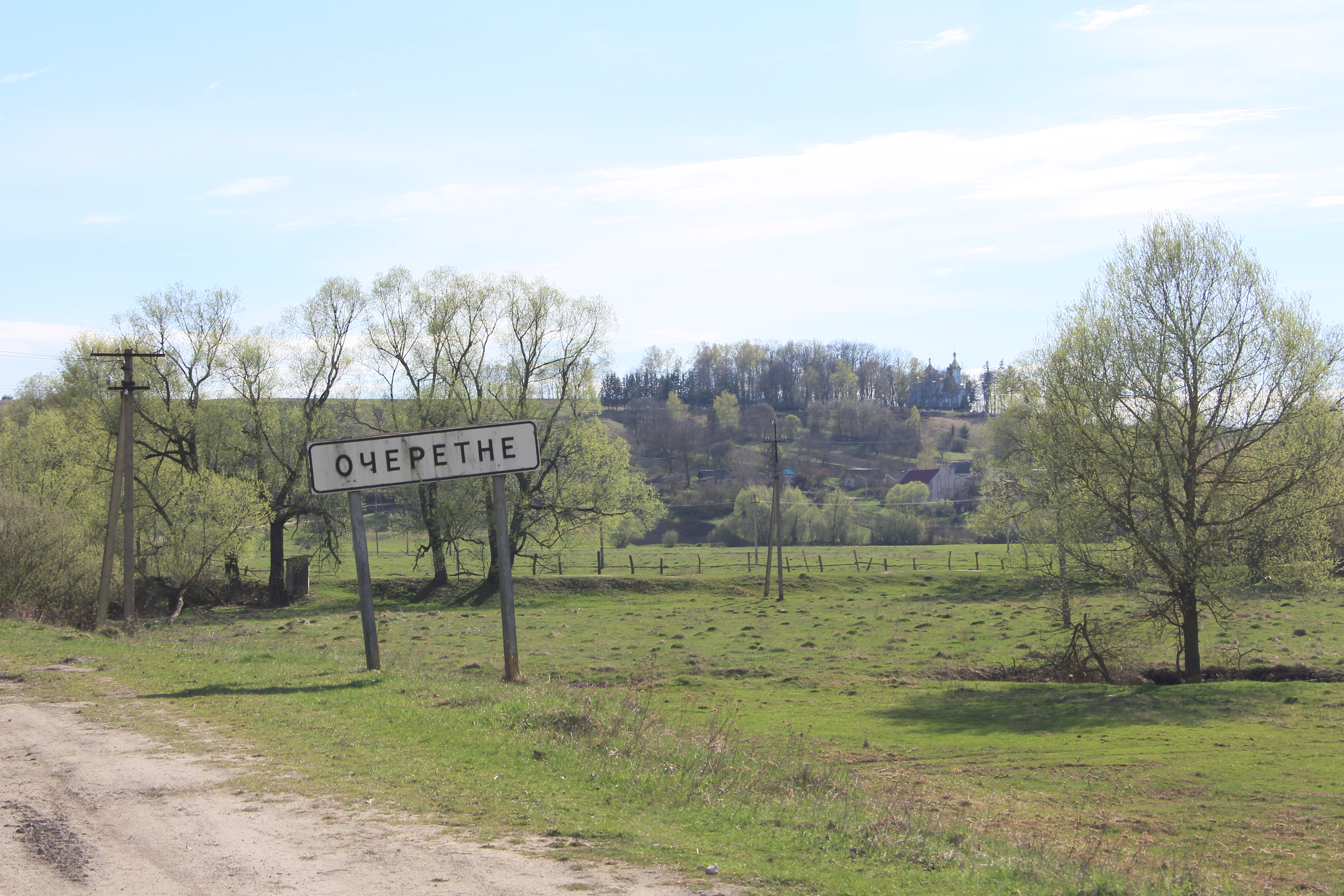
- Sign at the entrance to the village of Ocheretne.

- Location in Ternopil Oblast
- Coordinates: 49°49′52″N 25°36′00″E
- Country: Ukraine
- Oblast: Ternopil Oblast
- Raion: Kremenets Raion
- Hromada: Vyshnivets settlement hromada
- Time zone: UTC+2 (EET)
  - Summer (DST): UTC+3 (EEST)
- Postal code: 47064

Ocheretne (Ukrainian: Очеретне) is a village in the Vyshnivets settlement hromada of the Kremenets Raion of Ternopil Oblast in Ukraine. After the liquidation of the Zbarazh Raion on 19 July 2020, the village became part of the Kremenets Raion.

== Bibliography ==
- "Świniuchy 1.), wś, pow. krzemieniecki". Geographical Dictionary of the Kingdom of Poland (in Polish). 11. Warszawa: Kasa im. Józefa Mianowskiego. 1890. p. 709.
- "Świniuchy 1.), wś, pow. krzemieniecki". Geographical Dictionary of the Kingdom of Poland (in Polish). p. 635.
