= Velyki Viknyny =

Village in Ternopil Oblast, Ukraine

Velyki Viknyny Великі Вікнини
- Location in Ternopil Oblast
- Coordinates: 49°55′52″N 25°51′47″E
- Country: Ukraine
- Oblast: Ternopil Oblast
- Raion: Kremenets Raion
- Hromada: Vyshnivets Hromada
- Postal code: 47313

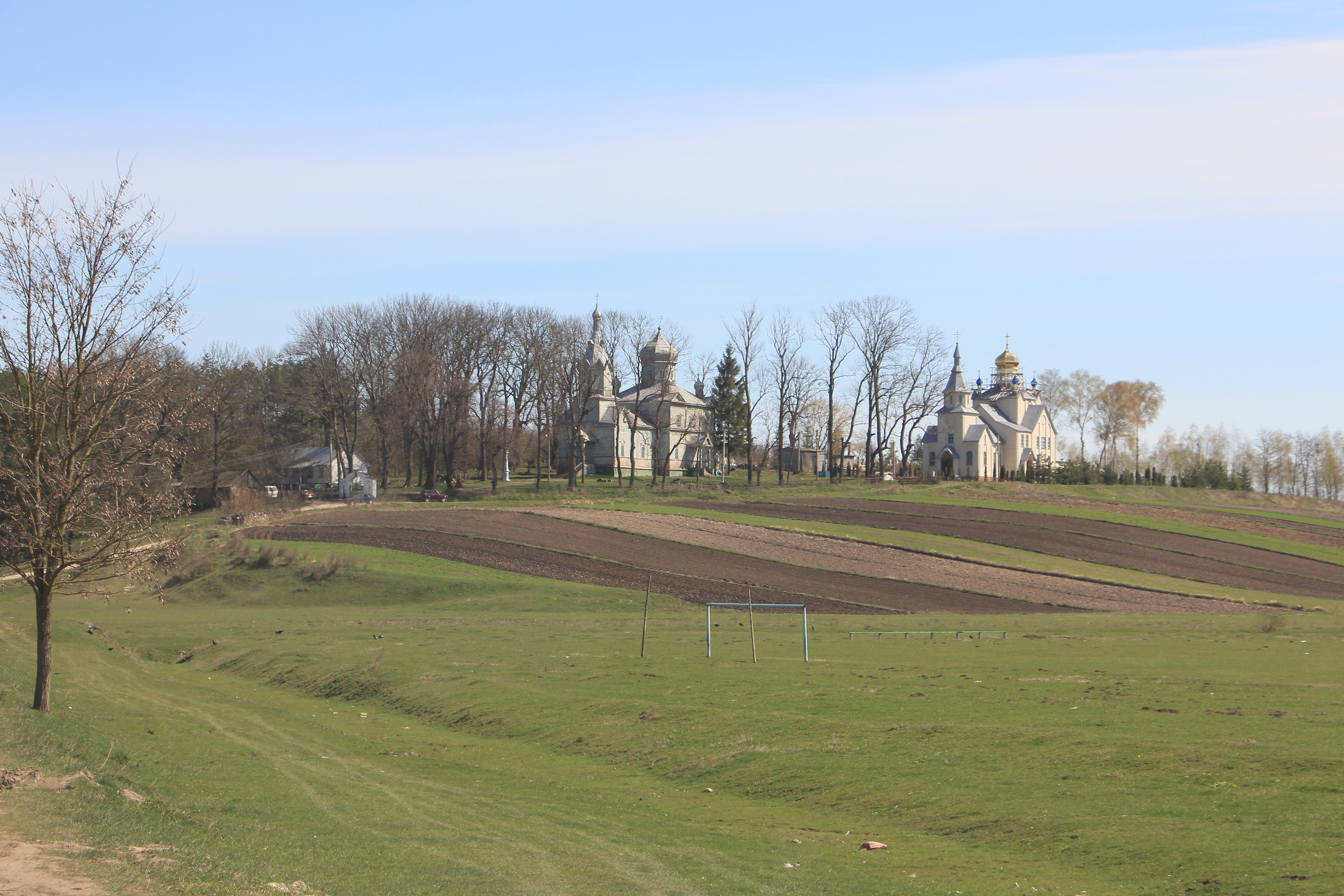
A church in the village

Velyki Viknyny (Ukrainian: Великі Вікнини) is a village in Vyshnivets settlement hromada, Kremenets Raion, Ternopil Oblast, Ukraine.

== History ==
The first written mention is from 1484.

== Religion ==
- 2 churches of St. George the Victorious (1741, wooden; 2000s, brick)

== Notable residents ==
- Zina Kushniruk (born 1962), Ukrainian journalist and editor
