= Fedkivtsi =

Rural locality in Ternopil Oblast, Ukraine

Fedkivtsi Федьківці
- Location in Ternopil Oblast
- Coordinates: 49°53′08″N 25°43′41″E
- Country: Ukraine
- Oblast: Ternopil Oblast
- Raion: Kremenets Raion
- Hromada: Vyshnivets settlement hromada
- Time zone: UTC+2 (EET)
  - Summer (DST): UTC+3 (EEST)
- Postal code: 47313

Fedkivtsi (Ukrainian: Федьківці) is a village in the Vyshnivets settlement hromada of the Kremenets Raion of Ternopil Oblast in Ukraine. After the liquidation of the Zbarazh Raion on 19 July 2020, the village became part of the Kremenets Raion.

== Bibliography ==
- (in Ukrainian) Ковальков Ю., Новосядла Н., Федьківці // Ternopil Encyclopedic Dictionary: in 4 v. / editorial board: H. Yavorskyi and other, Ternopil: "Zbruch", 2008, V. 3: П—Я, S. 515. — ISBN 978-966-528-279-2.
- "Fedkowce". Geographical Dictionary of the Kingdom of Poland (in Polish). p. 474.
