= Staryi Vyshnivets =

Rural locality in Ternopil Oblast, Ukraine

Staryi Vyshnivets Старий Вишнівець
- Location in Ternopil Oblast
- Coordinates: 49°53′18″N 25°45′09″E
- Country: Ukraine
- Oblast: Ternopil Oblast
- Raion: Kremenets Raion
- Hromada: Vyshnivets settlement hromada
- Time zone: UTC+2 (EET)
  - Summer (DST): UTC+3 (EEST)
- Postal code: 47315

Staryi Vyshnivets (Ukrainian: Старий Вишнівець) is a village in the Vyshnivets settlement hromada of the Kremenets Raion of Ternopil Oblast in Ukraine. After the liquidation of the Zbarazh Raion on 19 July 2020, the village became part of the Kremenets Raion.

== Bibliography ==
- (in Ukrainian) Бігус М., Головатюк В., Старий Вишнівець // Ternopil Encyclopedic Dictionary: in 4 v. / editorial board: H. Yavorskyi and other, Ternopil: "Zbruch", 2008, V. 3: П—Я, S. 332. — ISBN 978-966-528-279-2.
- "Wiśniowiec Stary". Geographical Dictionary of the Kingdom of Poland (in Polish). 13. Warszawa: Kasa im. Józefa Mianowskiego. 1893. p. 614.
