= Ustechko, Kremenets Raion, Ternopil Oblast =

Rural locality in Ternopil Oblast, Ukraine

Ustechko Устечко
- Location in Ternopil Oblast
- Coordinates: 49°51′0″N 25°36′49″E
- Country: Ukraine
- Oblast: Ternopil Oblast
- Raion: Kremenets Raion
- Hromada: Vyshnivets settlement hromada
- Time zone: UTC+2 (EET)
  - Summer (DST): UTC+3 (EEST)
- Postal code: 47062

Ustechko (Ukrainian: Устечко) is a village in the Vyshnivets settlement hromada of the Kremenets Raion of Ternopil Oblast in Ukraine.

== History ==
The first written mention of the village was in 1430.

== Religion ==
- St. Michael church (1862, wooden).

== Sources ==
- (in Ukrainian) Уніят В., Ханас В., Устечко // Ternopil Encyclopedic Dictionary: in 4 v. / editorial board: H. Yavorskyi and other, Ternopil: "Zbruch", 2008, V. 3: П—Я, S. 499. — ISBN 978-966-528-279-2.
