= Vyshnivets settlement hromada =

Hromada in Ternopil Oblast, Ukraine

Vyshnivets settlement hromada Вишнівецька селищна громада
- hromada
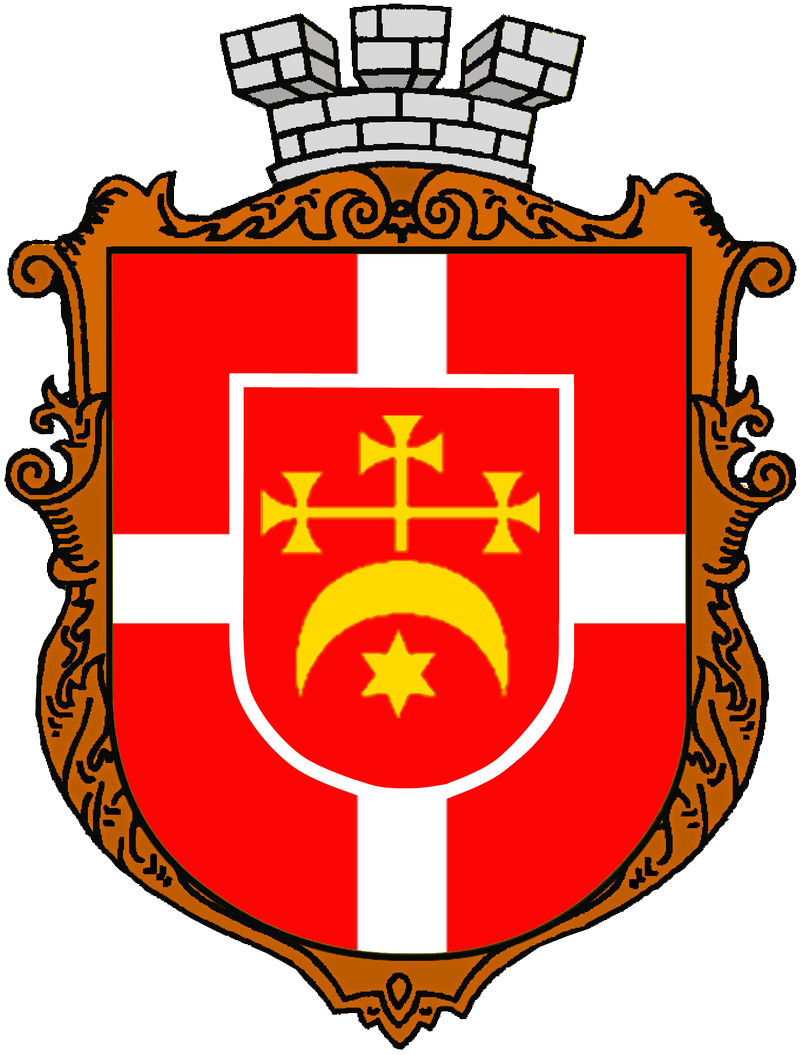
- Seal

- Location within Ternopil Oblast Location within Ukraine
- Coordinates: 49°54′00″N 25°44′00″E
- Country: Ukraine
- Oblast: Ternopil Oblast
- Raion: Kremenets Raion
- Administrative center: Vyshnivets

Government
  - Hromada head: Volodymyr Kravets

Area
  - Total: 74.7 km^{2} (28.8 sq mi)

Population (2022)
  - Total: 17,267
- Urban-type settlement: 1
- Villages: 27
- Website: vyshnivetska-gromada.gov.ua

Vyshnivets settlement hromada (Ukrainian: Вишнівецька селищна територіальна громада, romanized: Vyshnivetska selyshchna terytorialna hromada is a hromada in Ukraine, in Kremenets Raion of Ternopil Oblast. The administrative center is the urban-type settlement of Vyshnivets. Its population is 17,267 (2022 estimate) Established on 13 September 2016.

== Settlements ==
The community consists of 1 urban-type settlement (Vyshnivets) and 27 villages:

- Bakoty
- Bodaky
- Butyn
- Velykyi Kunynets
- Velyki Viknyny
- Hnydava
- Dzvyniacha
- Dibrova
- Zahoroddia
- Zalistsi
- Zashliakhom
- Kynakhivtsi
- Kotiuzhyny
- Kokhanivka
- Kryvchyky
- Lozy
- Malyi Kunynets
- Mali Viknyny
- Myshkivtsi
- Mlynivtsi
- Ocheretne
- Poliany
- Rakovets
- Staryi Vyshnivets
- Ustechko
- Fedkivtsi
- Khotovytsia
