= Saint Paraskeva Church, Kozyna, Ternopil Oblast =

Church in Ternopil Oblast, Ukraine

Saint Paraskeva Church
- Церква святої великомучениці Параскеви
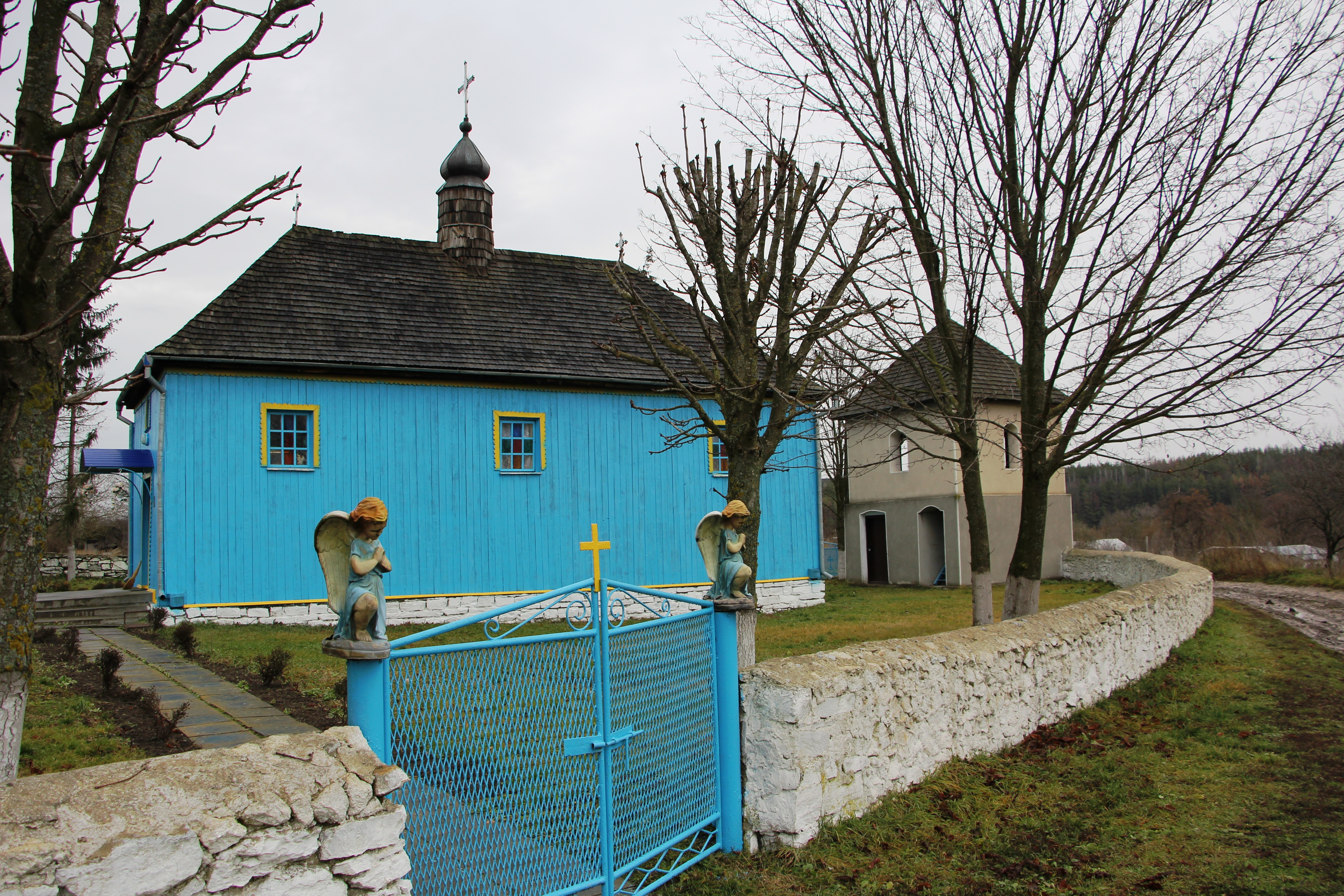

- Location within Ternopil Oblast

Religion
- Affiliation: Ukrainian Greek Catholic Church

Location
- Location: Kozyna, Hrymailiv settlement hromada, Chortkiv Raion, Ternopil Oblast, Ukraine
- Coordinates: 49°17′29″N 26°15′04″E

Architecture
- Completed: 1730

Immovable Monument of National Significance of Ukraine
- Official name: Церква та дзвіниця (дер.) (Church and bell tower (wooden))
- Type: Architecture
- Reference no.: 190089

Saint Paraskeva Church (Ukrainian: Церква святої великомучениці Параскеви) is a Greek Catholic parish church (UGCC) in Kozyna of the Hrymailiv settlement hromada of the Chortkiv Raion of the Ternopil Oblast, the church and bell tower are an architectural monument of national significance.

== History ==
The first Church of St. Paraskeva in the village of Kozyna was a wooden structure built in 1730 and consecrated by Father Lysenetskyi. At that time, the parish was a daughter parish to the community in the village of Kokoshyntsi. According to archival records, the original church and its bell tower later burned down during the ministry of Father Semen Liakhovych. A new church, also made of oak, was built on the same site in 1864.

From 1946 to 1993, the church was under the jurisdiction of the ROC. In 1960, the Soviet government officially closed it.

In 1993, the parish resumed its activities and returned to the fold of the UGCC, becoming a daughter parish to the village of Krasne. The church was fully restored the following year, in 1994.

The Pope's Worldwide Prayer Network brotherhood is active at the parish. The priest conducts catechesis, and the senior brother and sister are Ya. Smolinskyi and O. Ratych, respectively.

== Priests ==
- at. Mykhailo Povidaichuk (1730–?)
- at. Hryhorii Prokopovych (1750–?)
- at. Semen Liakhovych (1853–?)
- at. Dmytro Ksonzhek (1892–1943)
- at. Ivan Pachovskyi
- at. Oleh Sarabun (1994–1998)
- at. Stepan Hordii (1998–2006)
- at. Stepan Viityshyn (2006)
- at. Oleh Sarabun (administrator from 2006 to the present)
