= Stavky, Hrymailiv settlement hromada, Chortkiv Raion, Ternopil Oblast =

Rural locality in Ternopil Oblast, Ukraine

Stavky Ставки
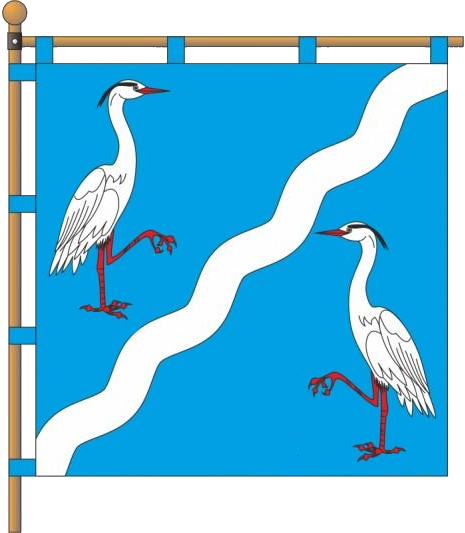
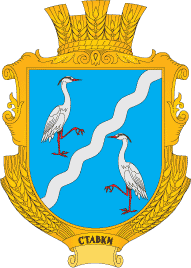
- Flag Coat of arms

- Location in Ternopil Oblast
- Coordinates: 49°18′43″N 26°12′19″E
- Country: Ukraine
- Oblast: Ternopil Oblast
- Raion: Chortkiv Raion
- Hromada: Hrymailiv settlement hromada
- Time zone: UTC+2 (EET)
  - Summer (DST): UTC+3 (EEST)
- Postal code: 48231

Stavky (Ukrainian: Ставки) is a village in Hrymailiv settlement hromada, Chortkiv Raion, Ternopil Oblast, Ukraine.

== History ==
The village was founded in the 2nd half of the 18th century on the fields of Krasne.

After the liquidation of the Husiatyn Raion on 19 July 2020, the village became part of the Chortkiv Raion.

== Religion ==
- St. Michael's chapel.

== Sources ==
- (in Ukrainian) Войтович, В., Ставки // Ternopil Encyclopedic Dictionary: in 4 v. / editorial board: H. Yavorskyi and other, Ternopil: "Zbruch", 2008, V. 3: П—Я, S. 325. — ISBN 978-966-528-279-2.
