= Pochwalski =

Pochwalski (feminine: Pochwalska; plural: Pochwalscy) is a Polish surname. Notable people with this surname include:

- Kazimierz Pochwalski (1855–1940), Polish painter
- Władysław Pochwalski (1860–1924), Polish painter and art restorer
