= Butsyky =

Rural locality in Ternopil Oblast, Ukraine

Butsyky Буцики
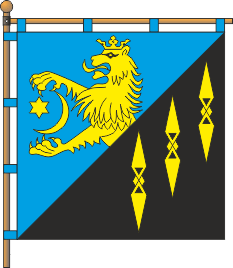
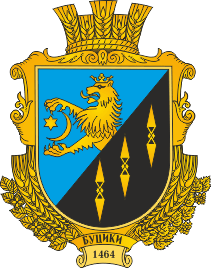
- Flag Coat of arms

- Location in Ternopil Oblast
- Coordinates: 49°19′16″N 26°01′37″E
- Country: Ukraine
- Oblast: Ternopil Oblast
- Raion: Chortkiv Raion
- Hromada: Hrymailiv settlement hromada
- Time zone: UTC+2 (EET)
  - Summer (DST): UTC+3 (EEST)
- Postal code: 48214

Butsyky (Ukrainian: Буцики) is a village in Hrymailiv settlement hromada, Chortkiv Raion, Ternopil Oblast, Ukraine.

== History ==
The first written mention is from 1464.

After the liquidation of the Husiatyn Raion on 19 July 2020, the village became part of the Chortkiv Raion.

== Religion ==
- Church of the Cathedral of the Blessed Virgin Mary (1861; brick; OCU and UGCC).

== Sources ==
- (in Ukrainian) Савчин О, Уніят В., Буцики // Ternopil Encyclopedic Dictionary: in 4 v. / editorial board: H. Yavorskyi and other, Ternopil: "Zbruch", 2004, V. 1: А—Й, S. 205–206. — ISBN 966-528-197-6.
- "Bucyki". Geographical Dictionary of the Kingdom of Poland (in Polish). 1. Warszawa: Kasa im. Józefa Mianowskiego. 1880. p. 433.
