= Volodyslav Fedorovych =

Polish historian, antiquarian, archivist (1845–1917)

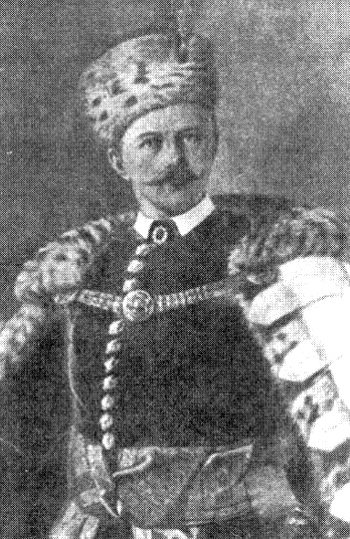
- Born: 26 May 1845; Bilynivka, now Ternopil Oblast, Ukraine
- Died: 22 December 1916 (aged 71); Kyiv/Vikno
- Education: University of Vienna, Sorbonne University, Collège de France
- Occupations: Land magnate, publicist, cultural and educational, socio-political activist, and philanthropist.

Volodyslav Valentyn Fedorovych of the Oginiec coat of arms (Ukrainian: Володислав Іванович Федорович; (26 May 1845 – 22 December 1917, Kyiv / 21 January 1918) was a Ukrainian Galician land magnate, publicist, cultural and educational, socio-political activist, and philanthropist. He was an Full Member of the Shevchenko Scientific Society.

== Biography ==
He was born on 26 May 1845, in the village of Bilitivka (later part of the Skalat district, Kingdom of Galicia and Lodomeria, Austrian Empire; now Bilynivka, Husiatyn Raion, Ternopil Oblast, Ukraine).

He was the son of Ivan Fedorovych, a landowner and Ukrainophile (narodovets) from the village of Vikno (Ternopil Oblast), and his wife Karolina née Nahlik, who died prematurely. He was raised by his father in a Ukrainian patriotic spirit.

He was the owner of the landed estate in Vikno. He was baptized according to the Uniate rite. He had a sister, Liudmyla (d. 1849).

During the 1863 Uprising, he intended to take part in it, but his father, who was an opponent of all uprisings, strongly objected to this. Influenced by the gymnasium's director, Father Vasyl Ilnytskyi, he became interested in philosophical and historical sciences and art.

After graduating from the gymnasium, he continued his studies abroad in the company of Father V. Ilnytskyi. In Vienna, he befriended Artur Grottger, who taught him drawing.

He studied for two years at the University of Vienna (Law) (1866–1868). He finished his law studies in Lviv.

From 1868 to 1870, he studied at the Sorbonne and the Collège de France in Paris. Later, he traveled across almost all of Europe (England, France, Switzerland, Italy, Germany).

Inheriting his father's estate in 1871, he quickly tripled its size. According to Adam Boniecki, he owned estates in the villages of Vikno, Tovste, Shliakhtyntsi, and others.

He introduced an exemplary agricultural (farming) economy and a weaving workshop (where masters A. Ivakhiv and A. Turyk worked) in Vikno, and a cooper-blacksmith-pottery school in Tovste.

From 1873 to 1877, he was the head (president) of the Prosvita Society in Lviv, and its honorary member (he donated 12,000 guilders to the society for the publication of school textbooks). He also financed archaeological excavations in Halych and an archaeological exhibition in Lviv. From 1873 to 1874, the Ukrainian painter Kornylo Ustyianovych lived on his estate in the village of Vikno (where he painted portraits and landscapes).

From 1879 to 1882, he was a deputy (member) of the Austrian Parliament (Chamber of Deputies, elected as the Ukrainian deputy with the assistance of the Polish committee; he was elected from the curia of rural communities in the Zhovkva–Sokal–Rava-Ruska district in the second round, following a fierce struggle with the Old Ruthenian candidate). Subsequently, he was a lifetime member of the House of Lords (Herrenhaus) starting in 1902, where he defended the interests of Ukrainians. He succeeded in obtaining an imperial decree from the Emperor of Austria-Hungary regarding teaching in the Ukrainian language in the senior grades of the Academic Gymnasium in Lviv.

In 1885, he participated as part of a deputation that protested to Emperor Franz Joseph against the reform of the Basilian Order.

He collected treasures of folk art in Vikno, where he founded a school and production of carpets. On the occasion of the visit of Crown Prince Archduke Rudolf to Ternopil in 1887, he organized a Ukrainian ethnographic exhibition there, which was unique in Galicia due to its size and richness (Ivan Franko worked as the secretary and correspondent).

On 22–23 November 1884 (or, according to another version, in April 1883), he visited Yabluniv together with Ivan Franko (they visited the estate of Count R. Czartoryski; described as a "forced visit" for I. Franko). After Ivan Franko wrote half of his father's biography, Fedorovych insisted that Franko "embellish" certain aspects of Ivan Fedorovych's past, which led to the termination of their collaboration.

In 1894, he participated in the funding of the Ukrainian ethno-pavilion at the Exhibition in Lviv. He contributed to the attempts of Ukrainians to reconcile with the Austrians and Poles, notably the initiatives of Kulish and Barvinskyi. Because of this, he had complex relations with the Poles, and lampoons were written about him. Standing between the camps, he could not become a deputy of the Galician Sejm either as a Pole or as a Ukrainian. He served on the Skalat District Council from 1876 to 1882. He was the curator of the regional cooper-blacksmith-pottery school in Tovste; he founded a carpet weaving school in Vikno.

On 27 July 1917, his estate was looted and set on fire by Bolshevized Russian soldiers during the army's retreat from Galicia. This destroyed the archive, a large library, a collection of old Ukrainian carpets, and an art gallery (totaling about 300 pieces, including one canvas that was probably the work of Cranach the Elder, as well as works by Szymon Czechowicz, Juliusz Kossak, and others).

He published his memoirs about his European travels, "Studia artystyczne, literaskie i spolecznie", and his father's works. He also collected materials for a large historical work about the events of 1809 and published the first volume in French.

In 2021, the process of creating a museum dedicated to Volodyslav Fedorovych began in the village of Vikno (Hrymailiv community, Ternopil Oblast). Based on the historical and local lore museum founded in Vikno in 2007 by Hanna Chemera, plans are underway to organize exhibition halls featuring unique carpet samples, household items, photographs, and archival materials.

=== Family ===
His daughter was the writer Ivanna Karolina, known as Dariia Vikonska.

== Bibliography ==
- (in Ukrainian) Волинський Б., Головин Б., Пиндус Б., Ханас В., Чемера Г., Федорович Володислав Іванович // Ternopil Encyclopedic Dictionary: in 4 v. / editorial board: H. Yavorskyi and other, Ternopil: "Zbruch", 2008, V. 3: П—Я, S. 511–512. — ISBN 978-966-528-279-2.
- Володислав Федорович (1845–1917) [Текст] / О. Кравченюк // Шляхами Золотого Поділля / Наукове товариство імені Шевченка ; редкол.: Р. Миколаєвич, П. Гайда, М. Кінасевич та ін. — Філядельфія, 1983. — Т. 3 : Тернопільщина і Скалатщина : Регіональний Історично-Мемуарний Збірник. — С. 633–634.
- Володислав Федорович - останній галицький боярин, видатний просвітянин і меценат [Текст] // Гомін волі [Текст]. — 2021. — No. 44 (18 листоп.). — С. 2 : фот.
- Гулей І. За силу й перемогу. Про Дарію Віконську та її книжку // Вільне життя плюс. — Тернопіль, 2016. — No. 38 (15774) (18 трав.). — С. 4.
- Знаменитий Федорович із Вікна : [про мецената, колекціонера, громад. і політ. діяча В. Федоровича] / Л. Островська // Сільський господар плюс Тернопільщина. — 2021. — No. 45 (10 лист.). — С. 7 : фот.
- Мельничук Б., Уніят В. Іван Франко і Тернопільщина. — Тернопіль : Тернограф, 2012. — 280 с. — ISBN 978-966-457-087-6.
- Музей Федоровича - родзинка села Вікно [Текст] / О. Біднюк // Голос народу [Текст]. — 2022. — No. 5 (3 лют.). — С. 4 : фот.
- Пам'ять бузкової гори [Текст] : до 175-річчя з дня народження мецената укр. просвітництва В. Федоровича / Г. Чемера // Сільський господар плюс Тернопільщина. — 2020. — No. 21 (27 трав.). — С. 7 : фот.
- У Вікні пошановують славних Федоровичів [Текст] : [іст.-краєзнав. музей "Незабутні імена" в с. Вікно Гримайл. громади осучаснили] / Л. Вітрянна // Сільський господар плюс Тернопільщина [Текст]. — 2021. — No. 46 (17 листоп.). — С. 3 : фот.
- Федорович Володислав // Енциклопедія українознавства : Словникова частина : [в 11 т.] / Наукове товариство імені Шевченка ; гол. ред. проф., д-р Володимир Кубійович. — Париж — Нью-Йорк : Молоде життя, 1955–1995. — ISBN 5-7707-4049-3.
- Федорович Володислав // Українська мала енциклопедія : 16 кн. : у 8 т. / проф. Є. Онацький. — Накладом Адміністратури УАПЦ в Аргентині. — Буенос-Айрес, 1967. — Т. 8, кн. XVI : Літери Уш — Я. — С. 1978. — 1000 екз.
- Boniecki A. Herbarz polski: wiadomości historyczno-genealogiczne o rodach szlacheckich. — Warszawa : Warszawskie Towarzystwo Akcyjne Artystyczno-Wydawnicze, 1902. Cz. 1. — T. 5. — S. 269. (in Polish)
- Kieniewicz S. Fedorowicz Władysław Walenty (1845–1918) // Polski Słownik Biograficzny. — Kraków : Nakładem Polskiej Akademii Umiejętności, 1948. — T. VI/5, zeszyt 30. — S. 390–391. (in Polish)
