= Bilynivka =

Rural locality in Ternopil Oblast, Ukraine

Bilynivka Білинівка
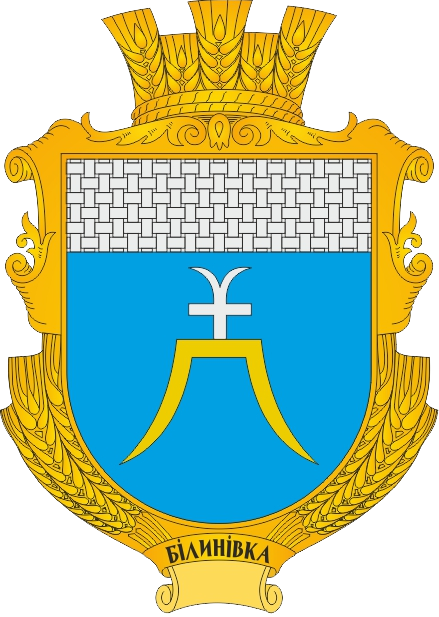
- Coat of arms

- Location in Ternopil Oblast
- Coordinates: 49°17′43″N 26°4′0″E
- Country: Ukraine
- Oblast: Ternopil Oblast
- Raion: Chortkiv Raion
- Hromada: Hrymailiv settlement hromada
- Time zone: UTC+2 (EET)
  - Summer (DST): UTC+3 (EEST)
- Postal code: 48210

Bilynivka (Ukrainian: Білинівка) is a village in Hrymailiv settlement hromada, Chortkiv Raion, Ternopil Oblast, Ukraine.

== History ==
The first written mention dates from 1415.

After the liquidation of the Husiatyn Raion on 19 July 2020, the village became part of the Chortkiv Raion.

== Religion ==
- Chapel of the Blessed Virgin Mary (1990).

== Notable residents ==
- Volodyslav Fedorovych (1845–1917/1918), Ukrainian Galician land magnate, publicist, cultural and educational, socio-political activist, and philanthropist

== Sources ==
- (in Ukrainian) Гончар Я., Уніят В., Білинівка // Ternopil Encyclopedic Dictionary: in 4 v. / editorial board: H. Yavorskyi and other, Ternopil: "Zbruch", 2004, V. 1: А—Й, S. 131. — ISBN 966-528-197-6.
