= Lezhanivka =

Rural locality in Ternopil Oblast, Ukraine

Lezhanivka Лежанівка
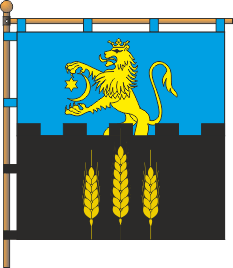
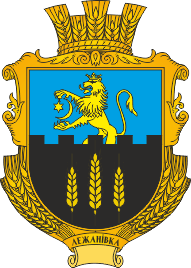
- Flag Coat of arms

- Location in Ternopil Oblast
- Coordinates: 49°18′35″N 26°3′13″E
- Country: Ukraine
- Oblast: Ternopil Oblast
- Raion: Chortkiv Raion
- Hromada: Hrymailiv settlement hromada
- Time zone: UTC+2 (EET)
  - Summer (DST): UTC+3 (EEST)
- Postal code: 48214

Lezhanivka (Ukrainian: Лежанівка) is a village in Hrymailiv settlement hromada, Chortkiv Raion, Ternopil Oblast, Ukraine.

== History ==
The first written mention is from 1415.

After the liquidation of the Husiatyn Raion on 19 July 2020, the village became part of the Chortkiv Raion.

== Religion ==
- Church of the Nativity of the Blessed Virgin Mary (1900, OCU, brick).

== Sources ==
- (in Ukrainian) Гончар Я., Ковальков Ю., Лежанівка // Ternopil Encyclopedic Dictionary: in 4 v. / editorial board: H. Yavorskyi and other, Ternopil: "Zbruch", 2005, V. 2: К—О, S. 339. — ISBN 966-528-199-2.
- "Leżanówka". Geographical Dictionary of the Kingdom of Poland (in Polish). 5. Warszawa: Kasa im. Józefa Mianowskiego. 1884. p. 195.
