= Olenivka, Ternopil Oblast =

Rural locality in Ternopil Oblast, Ukraine

Olenivka Оленівка
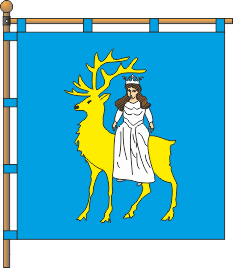
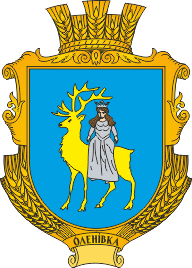
- Flag Coat of arms

- Location in Ternopil Oblast
- Coordinates: 49°17′44″N 25°58′31″E
- Country: Ukraine
- Oblast: Ternopil Oblast
- Raion: Chortkiv Raion
- Hromada: Hrymailiv settlement hromada
- Time zone: UTC+2 (EET)
  - Summer (DST): UTC+3 (EEST)
- Postal code: 48214

Olenivka (Ukrainian: Оленівка) is a village in Hrymailiv settlement hromada, Chortkiv Raion, Ternopil Oblast, Ukraine.

== History ==
It has been known since the 17th century as a Polish settlement.

After the liquidation of the Husiatyn Raion on 19 July 2020, the village became part of the Chortkiv Raion.

== Religion ==
- Church of the Holy Trinity (1997).

== Sources ==
- (in Ukrainian) Лашта В., Савчин О., Оленівка // Ternopil Encyclopedic Dictionary: in 4 v. / editorial board: H. Yavorskyi and other, Ternopil: "Zbruch", 2005, V. 2: К—О, S. 664. — ISBN 966-528-199-2.
- "Eleonorówka, także Łysa Góra, przysiółek". Geographical Dictionary of the Kingdom of Poland (in Polish). 2. Warszawa: Kasa im. Józefa Mianowskiego. 1881. p. 343.
