= Krutyliv =

Rural locality in Ternopil Oblast, Ukraine

Krutyliv Крутилів
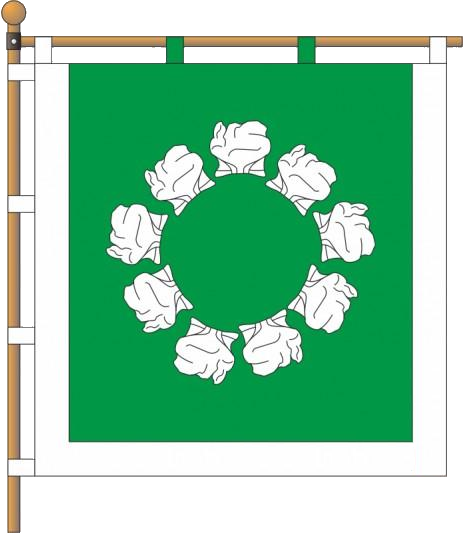
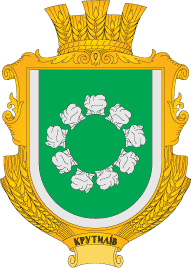
- Flag Coat of arms

- Location in Ternopil Oblast
- Coordinates: 49°13′46″N 26°11′55″E
- Country: Ukraine
- Oblast: Ternopil Oblast
- Raion: Chortkiv Raion
- Hromada: Hrymailiv settlement hromada
- Time zone: UTC+2 (EET)
  - Summer (DST): UTC+3 (EEST)
- Postal code: 48233

Krutyliv (Ukrainian: Крутилів) is a village in Hrymailiv settlement hromada, Chortkiv Raion, Ternopil Oblast, Ukraine.

== History ==
Until 19 July 2020, it belonged to the Husiatyn Raion. From 8 December 2020, it has been part of the Kopychyntsi urban hromada.

== Monuments ==
Near the village there is a "hermit's forest" with a chapel and a Slavic pagan settlement-sanctuary (Zvenyhorod tract, an archeological monument), which belongs to the only Zbruch cult center of the 10-13th centuries in Tovtry.

== Sources ==
- (in Ukrainian) Бігус М., Уніят В., Крутилів // Ternopil Encyclopedic Dictionary: in 4 v. / editorial board: H. Yavorskyi and other, Ternopil: "Zbruch", 2005, V. 2: К—О, S. 252. — ISBN 966-528-199-2.
- "Kręciłów". Geographical Dictionary of the Kingdom of Poland (in Polish). 4. Warszawa: Kasa im. Józefa Mianowskiego. 1883. p. 668.
