= Zelene, Hrymailiv settlement hromada, Chortkiv Raion, Ternopil Oblast =

Rural locality in Ternopil Oblast, Ukraine

Zelene Зелене
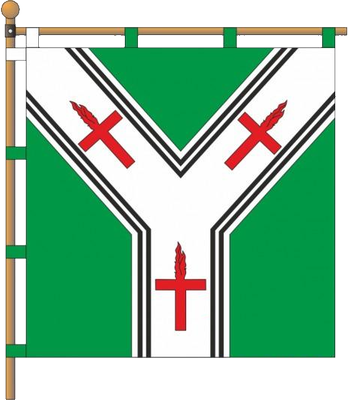
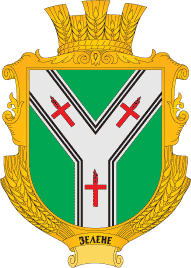
- Flag Coat of arms

- Location in Ternopil Oblast
- Coordinates: 49°18′41″N 26°6′10″E
- Country: Ukraine
- Oblast: Ternopil Oblast
- Raion: Chortkiv Raion
- Hromada: Hrymailiv settlement hromada
- Time zone: UTC+2 (EET)
  - Summer (DST): UTC+3 (EEST)
- Postal code: 48414

Zelene (Ukrainian: Зелене) is a village in Hrymailiv settlement hromada, Chortkiv Raion, Ternopil Oblast, Ukraine.

== History ==
It is known from the 15th century.

After the liquidation of the Husiatyn Raion on 19 July 2020, the village became part of the Chortkiv Raion.

== Religion ==
- St. Nicholas Church (1946; OCU; brick);
- Chapel of the Blessed Virgin Mary (1925; RCC).

An old village wooden church (1817) is kept in the National Museum of Folk Architecture and Folkways of Ukraine in Pyrohiv.

== Sources ==
- (in Ukrainian) Ternopil Encyclopedic Dictionary: in 4 v. / editorial board: H. Yavorskyi and other, Ternopil: "Zbruch", 2004, V. 1: А—Й, 696 s. — ISBN 966-528-197-6.
- "Zielona (9)". Geographical Dictionary of the Kingdom of Poland (in Polish). 14. Warszawa: Kasa im. Józefa Mianowskiego. 1895. p. 598.
