= Sadzhivky =

Rural locality in Ternopil Oblast, Ukraine

Sadzhivky Саджівки
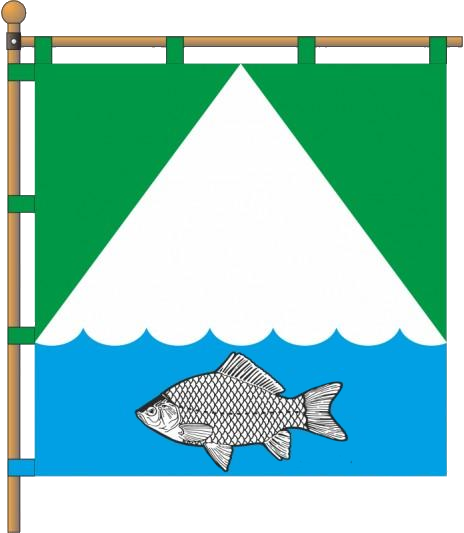
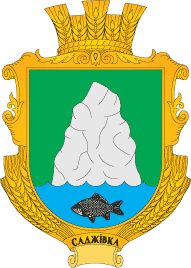
- Flag Coat of arms

- Location in Ternopil Oblast
- Coordinates: 49°16′51″N 26°9′1″E
- Country: Ukraine
- Oblast: Ternopil Oblast
- Raion: Chortkiv Raion
- Hromada: Hrymailiv settlement hromada
- Time zone: UTC+2 (EET)
  - Summer (DST): UTC+3 (EEST)
- Postal code: 48231

Sadzhivky (Ukrainian: Саджівки; until 2025 Sadzhivka) is a village in Hrymailiv settlement hromada, Chortkiv Raion, Ternopil Oblast, Ukraine.

== History ==
The first written mention is from 1648.

After the liquidation of the Husiatyn Raion on 19 July 2020, the village became part of the Chortkiv Raion.

== Religion ==
- St. Demetrius church (1911 and 1998, both brick).

== Sources ==
- (in Ukrainian) , Мохнацька М., Уніят, В. // Ternopil Encyclopedic Dictionary: in 4 v. / editorial board: H. Yavorskyi and other, Ternopil: "Zbruch", 2008, V. 3: П—Я, S. 221. — ISBN 978-966-528-279-2.
- "Sadzawki". Geographical Dictionary of the Kingdom of Poland (in Polish). 10. Warszawa: Kasa im. Józefa Mianowskiego. 1889. p. 208.
