= Rashtivtsi =

Rural locality in Ternopil Oblast, Ukraine

Rashtivtsi Раштівці
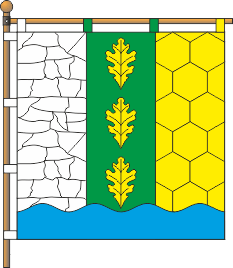
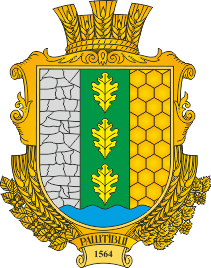
- Flag Coat of arms

- Location in Ternopil Oblast
- Coordinates: 49°13′33″N 26°5′59″E
- Country: Ukraine
- Oblast: Ternopil Oblast
- Raion: Chortkiv Raion
- Hromada: Hrymailiv settlement hromada
- Time zone: UTC+2 (EET)
  - Summer (DST): UTC+3 (EEST)
- Postal code: 48235

Rashtivtsi (Ukrainian: Раштівці) is a village in Hrymailiv settlement hromada, Chortkiv Raion, Ternopil Oblast, Ukraine.

== History ==
The first written mention is from 1564.

After the liquidation of the Husiatyn Raion on 19 July 2020, the village became part of the Chortkiv Raion.

== Religion ==
- The churches of the Assumption (1884, brick, in Dubkivtsi), the Ascension (1912), and the Ascension (2002, in Stinka),
- Roman Catholic Church (1913, restored in 1925; currently not in operation).

== Sources ==
- (in Ukrainian) Бігус М., Уніят, В., Раштівці // Ternopil Encyclopedic Dictionary: in 4 v. / editorial board: H. Yavorskyi and other, Ternopil: "Zbruch", 2008, V. 3: П—Я, S. 173. — ISBN 978-966-528-279-2.
- "Rasztowce". Geographical Dictionary of the Kingdom of Poland (in Polish). 9. Warszawa: Kasa im. Józefa Mianowskiego. 1888. p. 536.
