= Kalaharivka =

Rural locality in Ternopil Oblast, Ukraine

Kalaharivka Калагарівка
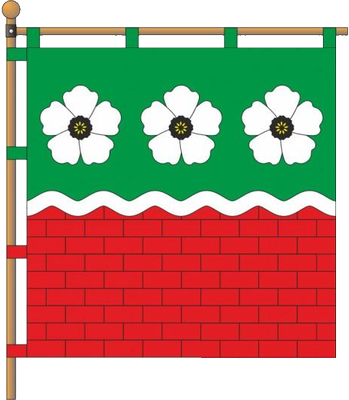
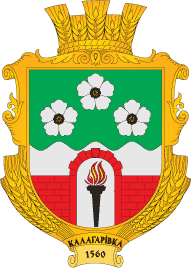
- Flag Coat of arms

- Location in Ternopil Oblast
- Coordinates: 49°15′18″N 26°14′29″E
- Country: Ukraine
- Oblast: Ternopil Oblast
- Raion: Chortkiv Raion
- Hromada: Hrymailiv settlement hromada
- Time zone: UTC+2 (EET)
  - Summer (DST): UTC+3 (EEST)
- Postal code: 48233

Kalaharivka (Ukrainian: Калагарівка) is a village in Hrymailiv settlement hromada, Chortkiv Raion, Ternopil Oblast, Ukraine.

== History ==
The first written mention is from 1560.

After the liquidation of the Husiatyn Raion on 19 July 2020, the village became part of the Chortkiv Raion.

== Religion ==
- Church of the Presentation of the Blessed Virgin Mary (1920).

== Sources ==
- (in Ukrainian) В. Гаджук, В. Уніят, о. М. Шаварин., Калагарівка // Ternopil Encyclopedic Dictionary: in 4 v. / editorial board: H. Yavorskyi and other, Ternopil: "Zbruch", 2005, V. 2: К—О, S. 12. — ISBN 966-528-199-2.
- "Kałaharówka, z Wychwatańcami i Kręciłowem, wieś w pow. skałackim". Geographical Dictionary of the Kingdom of Poland (in Polish). 3. Warszawa: Kasa im. Józefa Mianowskiego. 1882. p. 717.
