= Volytsia, Chortkiv Raion, Ternopil Oblast =

Rural locality in Ternopil Oblast, Ukraine

Volytsia Волиця
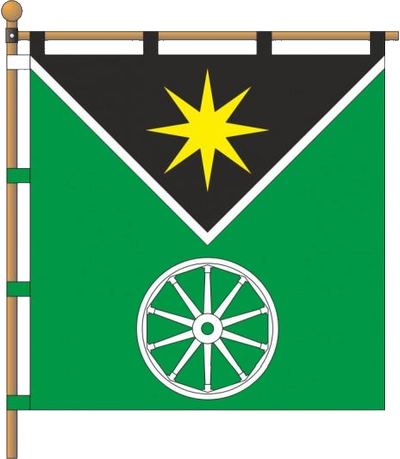
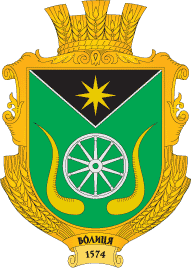
- Flag Coat of arms

- Location in Ternopil Oblast
- Coordinates: 49°16′28″N 26°13′2″E
- Country: Ukraine
- Oblast: Ternopil Oblast
- Raion: Chortkiv Raion
- Hromada: Hrymailiv settlement hromada
- Time zone: UTC+2 (EET)
  - Summer (DST): UTC+3 (EEST)
- Postal code: 48233

Volytsia (Ukrainian: Волиця) is a village in Hrymailiv settlement hromada, Chortkiv Raion, Ternopil Oblast, Ukraine.

== History ==
The first written mention is from 1574.

After the liquidation of the Husiatyn Raion on 19 July 2020, the village became part of the Chortkiv Raion.

== Religion ==
- Saint Anna church and bell tower (1650; wooden, architectural monuments of national importance).

== Sources ==
- (in Ukrainian) Гаджук, В., Волиця // Ternopil Encyclopedic Dictionary: in 4 v. / editorial board: H. Yavorskyi and other, Ternopil: "Zbruch", 2004, V. 1: А—Й, S. 297. — ISBN 966-528-197-6.
