= Monastyrykha =

Rural locality in Ternopil Oblast, Ukraine

Monastyrykha Монастириха
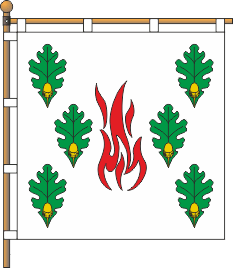
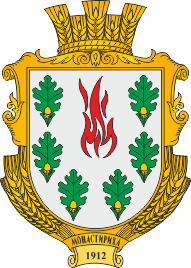
- Flag Coat of arms

- Location in Ternopil Oblast
- Coordinates: 49°21′28″N 26°8′40″E
- Country: Ukraine
- Oblast: Ternopil Oblast
- Raion: Chortkiv Raion
- Hromada: Hrymailiv settlement hromada
- Time zone: UTC+2 (EET)
  - Summer (DST): UTC+3 (EEST)
- Postal code: 48210

Monastyrykha (Ukrainian: Монастириха) is a village in Hrymailiv settlement hromada, Chortkiv Raion, Ternopil Oblast, Ukraine.

== History ==
Until 19 July 2020, it belonged to the Husiatyn Raion. From 8 December 2020, it has been part of the Kopychyntsi urban hromada.

== Religion ==
- Church of the Ascension (1939, brick, OCU and UGCC).

== Sources ==
- (in Ukrainian) Задорожний М., Савчин О., Монастириха // Ternopil Encyclopedic Dictionary: in 4 v. / editorial board: H. Yavorskyi and other, Ternopil: "Zbruch", 2005, V. 2: К—О, S. 557. — ISBN 966-528-199-2.
