= Kut, Ternopil Oblast =

Rural locality in Ternopil Oblast, Ukraine

Kut Кут
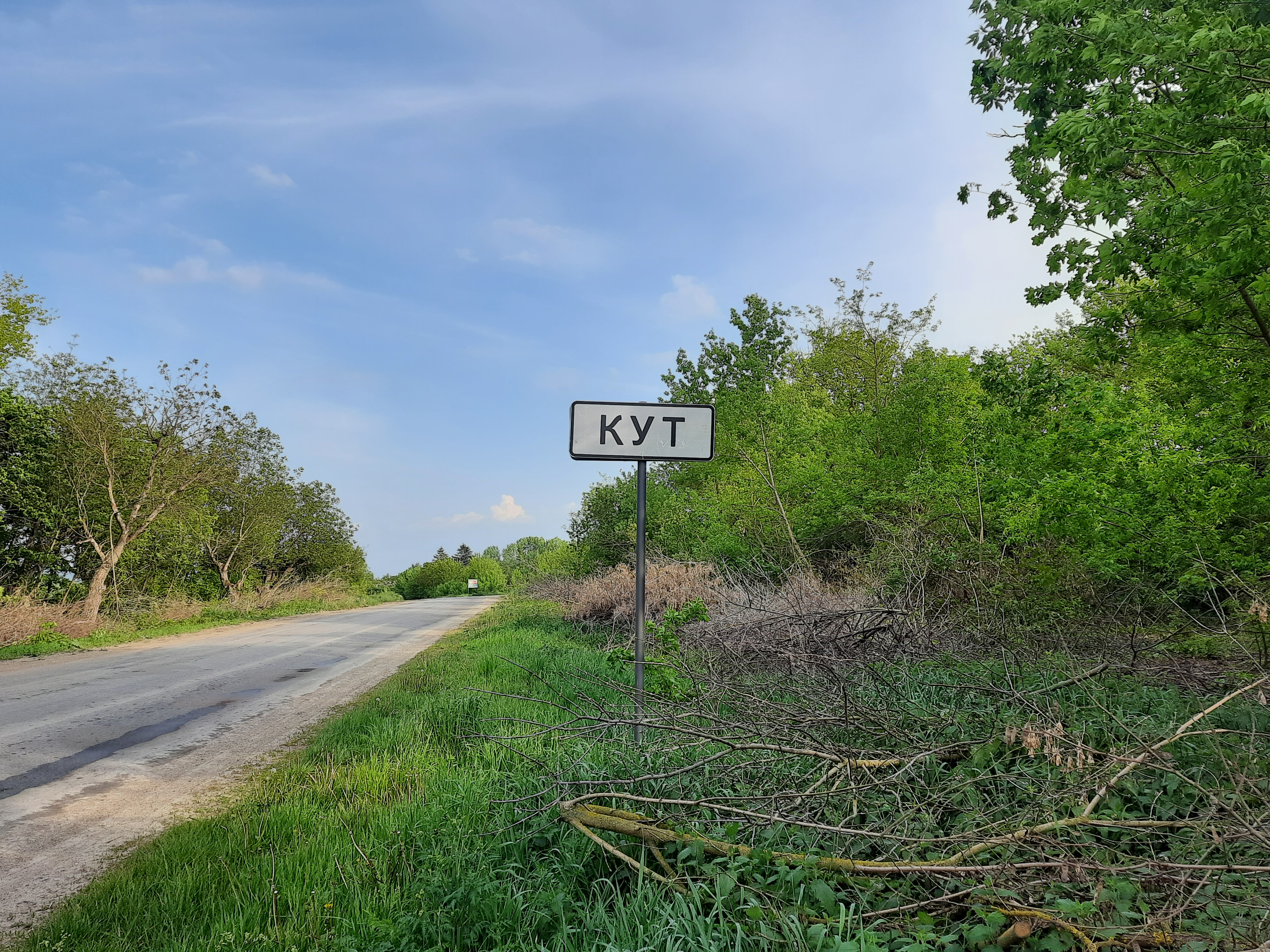

- Location in Ternopil Oblast
- Coordinates: 49°16′23″N 26°4′50″E
- Country: Ukraine
- Oblast: Ternopil Oblast
- Raion: Chortkiv Raion
- Hromada: Hrymailiv settlement hromada
- Time zone: UTC+2 (EET)
  - Summer (DST): UTC+3 (EEST)
- Postal code: 48210

Kut (Ukrainian: Кут) is a village in Hrymailiv settlement hromada, Chortkiv Raion, Ternopil Oblast, Ukraine.

== History ==
The first written mention is from 1449.

After the liquidation of the Husiatyn Raion on 19 July 2020, the village became part of the Chortkiv Raion.

== Religion ==
- Church of the Holy Trinity (restored in 1992; brick).

== Sources ==
- (in Ukrainian) Мельничук Б., Кут // Ternopil Encyclopedic Dictionary: in 4 v. / editorial board: H. Yavorskyi and other, Ternopil: "Zbruch", 2005, V. 2: К—О, S. 296. — ISBN 966-528-199-2.
- "Touste, z przys. Kąt". Geographical Dictionary of the Kingdom of Poland (in Polish). 12. Warszawa: Kasa im. Józefa Mianowskiego. 1892. p. 433.
