= Paivka =

Rural locality in Ternopil Oblast, Ukraine

Paivka Паївка
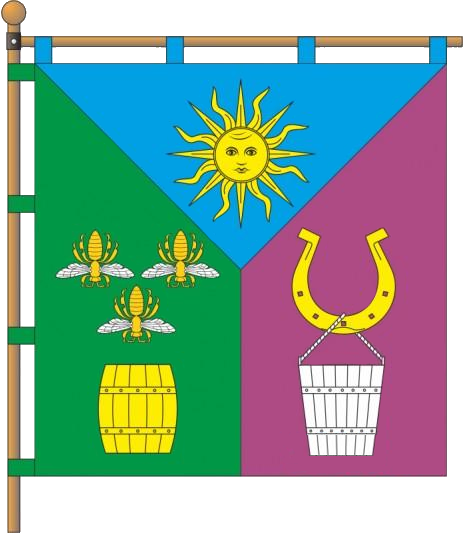
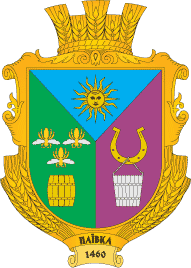
- Flag Coat of arms

- Location in Ternopil Oblast
- Coordinates: 49°19′14″N 26°6′51″E
- Country: Ukraine
- Oblast: Ternopil Oblast
- Raion: Chortkiv Raion
- Hromada: Hrymailiv settlement hromada
- Time zone: UTC+2 (EET)
  - Summer (DST): UTC+3 (EEST)
- Postal code: 48230

Paivka (Ukrainian: Паївка) is a village in Hrymailiv settlement hromada, Chortkiv Raion, Ternopil Oblast, Ukraine.

== History ==
The first written mention is from 1460.

After the liquidation of the Husiatyn Raion on 19 July 2020, the village became part of the Chortkiv Raion.

== Religion ==
- Church of Saints Volodymyr and Olha (1996, brick).

== Sources ==
- (in Ukrainian) Уніят, В., Паївка // Ternopil Encyclopedic Dictionary: in 4 v. / editorial board: H. Yavorskyi and other, Ternopil: "Zbruch", 2008, V. 3: П—Я, S. 14. — ISBN 978-966-528-279-2.
- "Pajówka". Geographical Dictionary of the Kingdom of Poland (in Polish). 7. Warszawa: Kasa im. Józefa Mianowskiego. 1886. p. 819.
