= Mali Birky =

Rural locality in Ternopil Oblast, Ukraine

Mali Birky Малі Бірки
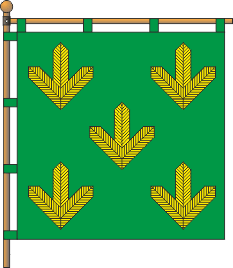
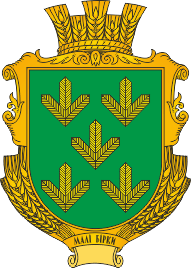
- Flag Coat of arms

- Location in Ternopil Oblast
- Coordinates: 49°14′39″N 26°6′12″E
- Country: Ukraine
- Oblast: Ternopil Oblast
- Raion: Chortkiv Raion
- Hromada: Hrymailiv settlement hromada
- Time zone: UTC+2 (EET)
  - Summer (DST): UTC+3 (EEST)
- Postal code: 48234

Mali Birky (Ukrainian: Малі Бірки) is a village in Hrymailiv settlement hromada, Chortkiv Raion, Ternopil Oblast, Ukraine.

== History ==
It has been known from 1564.

After the liquidation of the Husiatyn Raion on 19 July 2020, the village became part of the Chortkiv Raion.

== Religion ==
- Church of the Blessed Virgin Mary and Saint Joseph (1846, brick).

== Sources ==
- (in Ukrainian) Савчин О., Хаварівський, Б., Малі Бірки // Ternopil Encyclopedic Dictionary: in 4 v. / editorial board: H. Yavorskyi and other, Ternopil: "Zbruch", 2005, V. 2: К—О, S. 447. — ISBN 966-528-199-2.
- "Borki 4.) B. małe, wieś, pow. skałacki". Geographical Dictionary of the Kingdom of Poland (in Polish). 1. Warszawa: Kasa im. Józefa Mianowskiego. 1880. p. 312.
