= Tovste =

Tovste can refer to:

- Tovste (urban-type settlement), a town in Chortkiv Raion of Ternopil Oblast, Ukraine.
- Tovste, a village in Chortkiv Raion of Ternopil Oblast, Ukraine.
- Tovste, formerly Tolstoy, a village in Volnovakha Raion, Donetsk Oblast, Ukraine.
