= Piznanka =

Rural locality in Ternopil Oblast, Ukraine

Piznanka Пізнанка
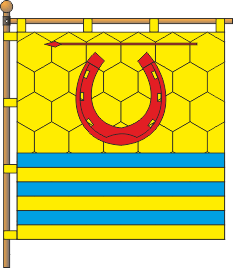
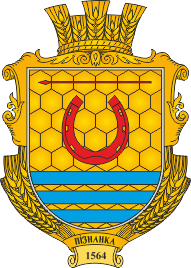
- Flag Coat of arms

- Location in Ternopil Oblast
- Coordinates: 49°21′40″N 25°56′31″E
- Country: Ukraine
- Oblast: Ternopil Oblast
- Raion: Chortkiv Raion
- Hromada: Hrymailiv settlement hromada
- Time zone: UTC+2 (EET)
  - Summer (DST): UTC+3 (EEST)
- Postal code: 48216

Piznanka (Ukrainian: Пізнанка) is a village in Hrymailiv settlement hromada, Chortkiv Raion, Ternopil Oblast, Ukraine.

== History ==
The first written mention is in 1628 (according to other sources – 1564).

After the liquidation of the Husiatyn Raion on 19 July 2020, the village became part of the Chortkiv Raion.

== Religion ==
- St. Demetrius church (1901, rebuilt from a church in the 1990s).

== Sources ==
- (in Ukrainian) Ковальков Ю., Уніят В., Пізнанка // Ternopil Encyclopedic Dictionary: in 4 v. / editorial board: H. Yavorskyi and other, Ternopil: "Zbruch", 2008, V. 3: П—Я, S. 86. — ISBN 978-966-528-279-2.
- "Poznanka 1.) P. Hetmańska". Geographical Dictionary of the Kingdom of Poland (in Polish). 8. Warszawa: Kasa im. Józefa Mianowskiego. 1887. p. 959.
