= Hrymailiv Castle =

Castle in Hrymailiv, Ternopil Oblast, Ukraine

- Гримайлівський замок
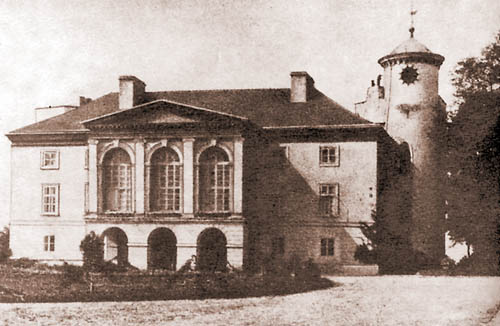
- Hrymailiv Castle Palace (1930s)
- Interactive map of the Hrymailiv Castle area

General information
- Status: Architectural monument of local importance
- Location: Hrymailiv, Chortkiv Raion, Ternopil Oblast, Ukraine
- Coordinates: 49°20′07″N 26°00′36″E

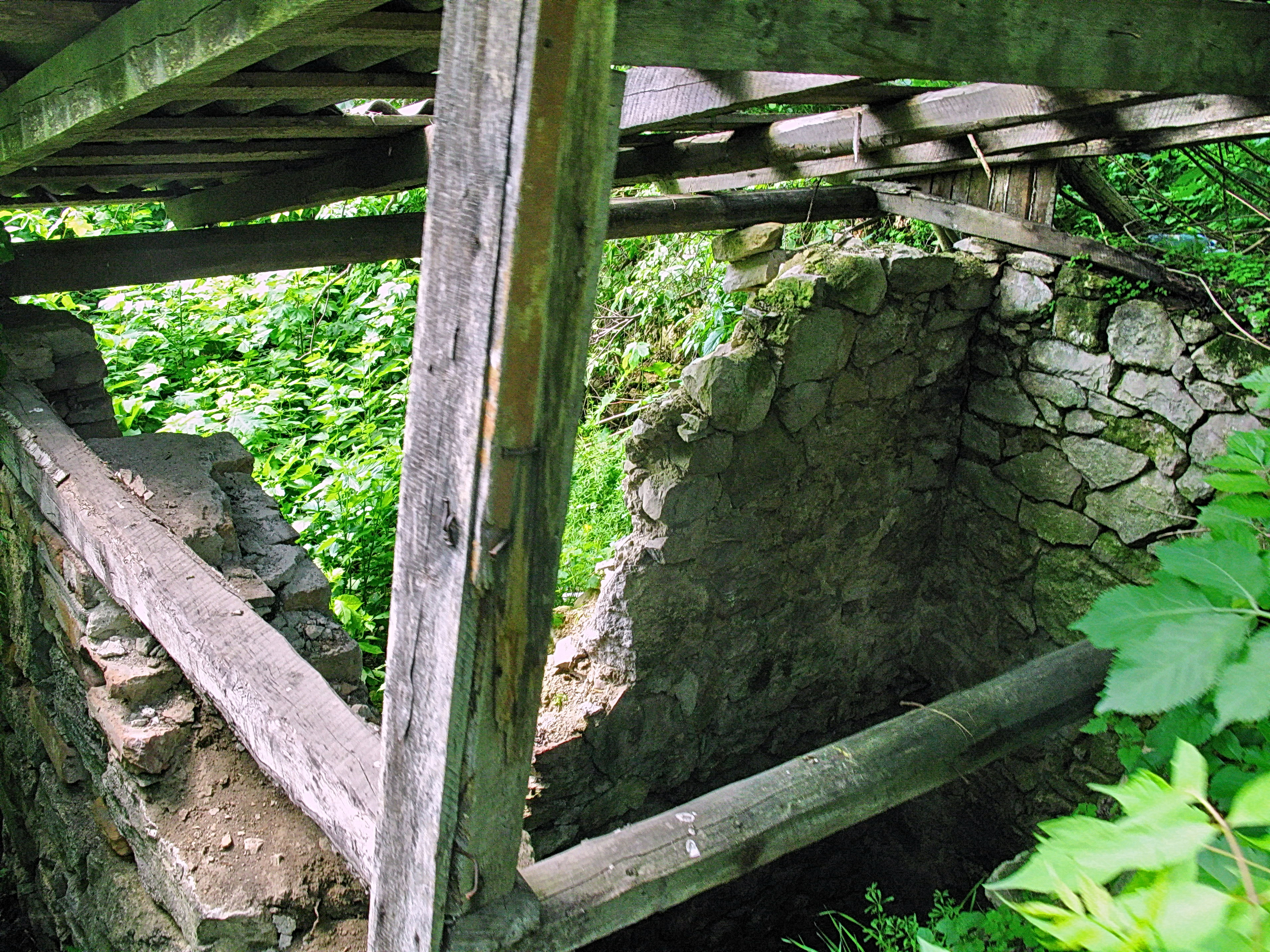
Ruins of the castle

The Hrymailiv Castle (Ukrainian: Гримайлівський замок, romanized: Hrymailivs'kyi zamok) is located in Hrymailiv, Ternopil Oblast, Ukraine. At the end of the 16th century, Hrymailiv was owned by the Ludzicki family of the Grzymala coat of arms, who erected a castle here, and an architectural monument of local importance.

== History ==
The stronghold was destroyed during the wars with the Cossacks and also Tatar and Turkish attacks in 1651, 1675. After the war damage in the first half of the 18th century, the castle was restored and strengthened in defense by Adam Mikołaj Sieniawski of the Leliwa coat of arms, to whom Hrymailiv had belonged from at least 1715. In 1726, following the death of Adam Mikołaj Sieniawski in Lviv, the last male member of the family, his daughter Maria Zofia Czartoryska married August Aleksander Czartoryski, Voivode of the Rus, in July 1731 in Warsaw and brought a huge estate as dowry. The next owner of the stronghold was Maria Zofia Czartoryska's daughter: Izabela Lubomirska (Elżbieta Czartoryska), the spouse of the Grand Marshal of the Crown (Hetman) Stanislaw Lubomirski. In 1805 the castle suffered a fire, during which the fire consumed the upper floors. The stronghold was rebuilt in a fairly short time, eliminating the chapel. In its place, stables were built on the first floor and kitchens on the first floor. In 1816, after the death of Izabela Lubomirska (Elisabeth Czartoryska), the estate was given to Konstancja Rzewuska, née Lubomirska. In 1825 the estate was auctioned off due to debts. Banker Leopold Elkan de Elkansberg became the next owner of the estate.

== Equipment ==
The castle was famous for its rich furnishings: stylish furniture, paintings and portraits of the owners painted by Juliusz Kossak, Wojciech Kossak, Tadeusz Ajdukiewicz, Alojzy Rejchan. The library had more than 5,000 volumes, and the archive was from the 16th-18th centuries. All this was lost during World War I and World War II: during World War I the facility was destroyed and robbed. The Wolański family managed to rebuild it by 1927; the outbreak of World War II saw another plundering of the historic collection.

== Palace ==
On 15 March 1831, the estate was bought from Leopold Elkansberg by Antym Nikorowicz, an Armenian by origin, who decided to rebuild the fortress into a modern palace with an English park around 1840. The southern wing with 2. hexagonal towers at the ends survived, and a large portico with a grand gallery and a cylindrical tall clock tower were added. After Antym's death in 1852, the estate was inherited by his eldest son Karol (1830–1859) who swapped it for the Rokietnica estate near Jarosław belonging to his brother-in-law Leonard Piniński (1824–1886). After Pininski's death, his two eldest sons, Stanislaw Antym (1854–1911) and Professor Leon Jan (1857–1938, governor of Galicia in 1898–1903), became owners. After World War I, there was a property division as a result of which half of the estate remained in the hands of Leon Jan (his nephew Mieczyslaw count Piniński (1898–1945) inherited from him), and the other half including Hrymailiv together with the castle fell to Stanisław's daughter: Julia Pinińska (1885–1975), who married Władysław count Wolański (1886–1940). Devastated during World War I, the castle was rebuilt by Wolański, who was arrested by the Soviet occupiers in 1939 and died tragically in a Kyiv prison. During the occupation, the palace was completely devastated and looted by nationalists and the local Ukrainian population, all goods were stolen: richly decorated furniture, valuable paintings, porcelain and other things representing any value. After World War II, on the orders of the Ukrainian communists, the castle was dismantled down to its foundations and the acquired building material was used to mark the road to Terebovlia. The palace's cordegarden survived until modern times. What has survived, however, is the once beautiful English park with specimens of old-growth trees, along with the remains of the Linden Avenue, founded in the first half of the 18th century by Hetman Adam Sieniawski, turned into a public garden.

== Architecture ==
In the 16th century it was a defensive four-wing castle, built on a square plan with 4. hexagonal towers at the corners, surrounded by a moat and earthen ramparts. The entrance to the fortress was from the east via a drawbridge. The armory was located in the southeastern tower and the castle chapel in the southwestern tower.

== Bibliography ==
- Filip Sulimierski, Bronisław Chlebowski, Władysław Walewski, Słownik geograficzny Królestwa Polskiego i innych krajów słowiańskich, t. II, Warszawa, 1880–1902, s. 897
- Aftanazy Roman, Dzieje rezydencji na dawnych kresach Rzeczypospolitej. Województwo ruskie, Ziemia Halicka i Lwowska, T. 7, wyd. 2 przejrzane i uzupełnione, Zakład Narodowy im. Ossolińskich, Wrocław, Warszawa, 1995, ISBN 83-04-03701-7 całość, ISBN 83-04-04229-0 t. 7, ss. 56–67
- Ukraina zachodnia: tam szum Prutu, Czeremoszu..., zespół red. A. Strojny, K. Bzowski, A. Grossman, Kraków, Wyd. Bezdroża, 2005, ISBN 83-921981-6-6, ss. 279-280
