= Novosilka, Hrymailiv settlement hromada, Chortkiv Raion, Ternopil Oblast =

Rural locality in Ternopil Oblast, Ukraine

Novosilka Новосілка
- Location in Ternopil Oblast
- Coordinates: 49°15′10″N 26°6′18″E
- Country: Ukraine
- Oblast: Ternopil Oblast
- Raion: Chortkiv Raion
- Hromada: Hrymailiv settlement hromada
- Time zone: UTC+2 (EET)
  - Summer (DST): UTC+3 (EEST)
- Postal code: 48234

Novosilka (Ukrainian: Новосілка) is a village in Hrymailiv settlement hromada, Chortkiv Raion, Ternopil Oblast, Ukraine.

== History ==
It has been known from 1564.

After the liquidation of the Husiatyn Raion on 19 July 2020, the village became part of the Chortkiv Raion.

== Religion ==
- St. Anthony's Church (1930, brick, OCU and UGCC),
- an inactive church (1929, RCC).

== Sources ==
- (in Ukrainian) Фостик Н., Новосілка // Ternopil Encyclopedic Dictionary: in 4 v. / editorial board: H. Yavorskyi and other, Ternopil: "Zbruch", 2005, V. 2: К—О, S. 641. — ISBN 966-528-199-2.
