= Jakob Altenberg =

Austrian businessman

- Born: 1875; Kingdom of Galicia and Lodomeria
- Died: 1944 (aged 68–69); Vienna, Austria
- Occupation: Businessman
- Known for: Business association with Adolf Hitler during his Vienna period (1909–1913)

Jakob Altenberg (1875–1944) was an Austrian businessman and picture frame dealer. Altenberg, who was Jewish by birth, was a business partner of the young Adolf Hitler in his Vienna period (1909–13).

== Early life ==
Jakob Altenberg was born in Hrymailiv, near Skalat, eastern Galicia-Lodomeria (in present-day Ukraine), in 1875. He was the son of a Jewish couple, Moses and Sarah Altenberg.

As a young man, Altenberg travelled to Vienna, where he learned gilding. In 1902, he married a Catholic Viennese innkeeper's daughter. The marriage produced two children, daughter Adele (b. 1896) and son Jakob Jr. (b. 1902).

In 1898, Altenberg opened his first store as a frame dealer at 37 Wiedner Hauptstraße. Within a few years he established a chain of framing shops that also sold framed pictures and small art objects. In addition to the shop on Wiedner Hauptstraße, three other branches were opened, including one on Vienna's largest shopping street, Mariahilfer Straße.

== Relationship with Hitler ==
From 1909 to 1913, Altenberg was in business contact with the young Adolf Hitler, who lived at that time as a painter in Vienna. Until his move to Germany in May 1913, Hitler supplied Altenberg's stores on a regular basis with his own paintings, mostly watercolours, which Altenberg used as filler for the frames on display. The relationship between Hitler and Altenberg was good regardless of Altenberg's Jewish ancestry, and Altenberg is reported to have said that he never heard Hitler utter an anti-Semitic remark.

== Later life ==
After the Anschluss in 1938, Altenberg's business was "Aryanized", his property was confiscated, and he was reduced to a minimum pension. He sold the remainder of Hitler's paintings, for a small sum, to the main archive of the NSDAP. He escaped deportation after 1942 because his wife was Aryan. He died in Vienna in 1944.
