= Kozyna, Ternopil Oblast =

Rural locality in Ternopil Oblast, Ukraine

Kozyna Козина
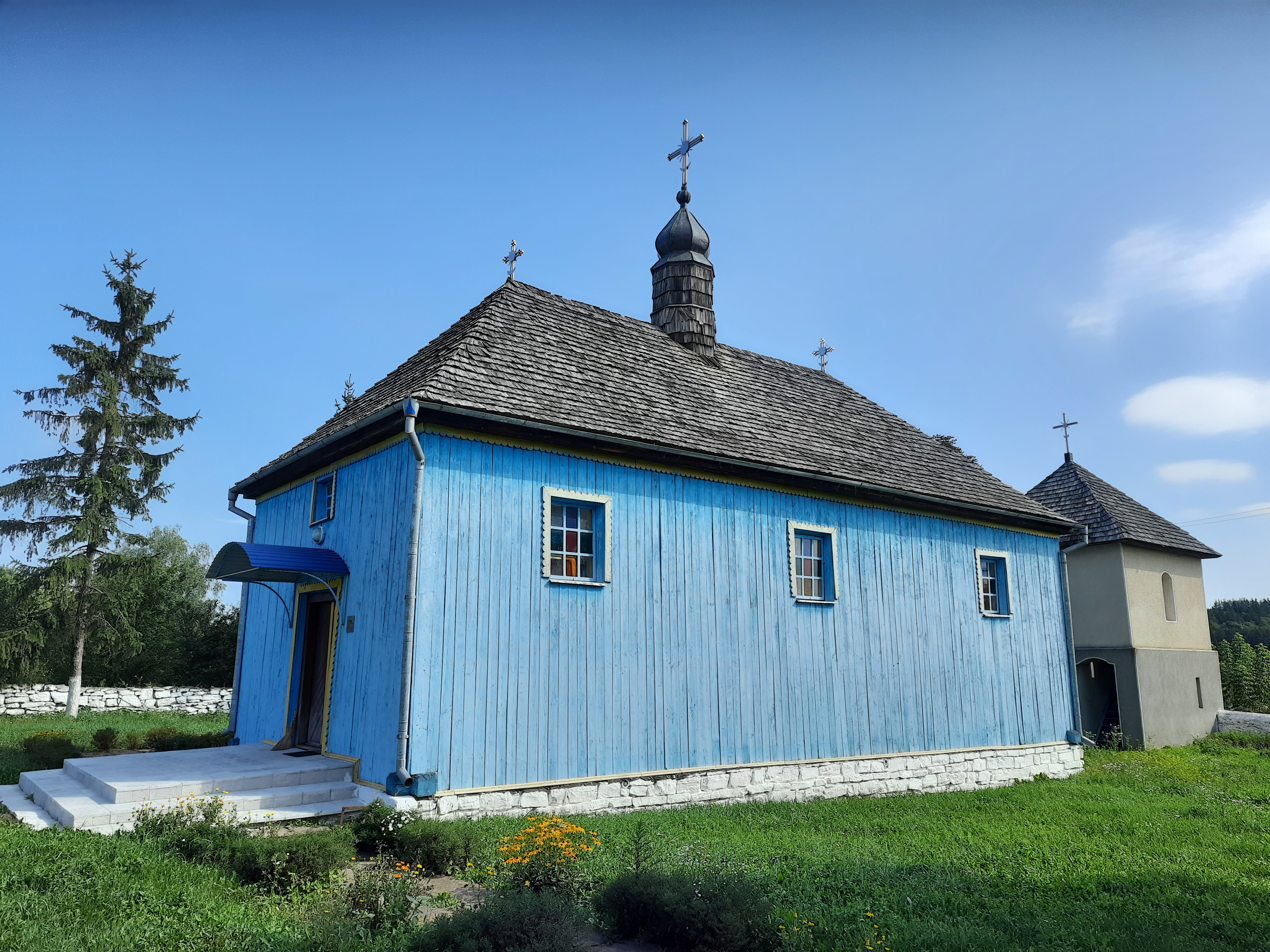
- Saint Paraskeva church

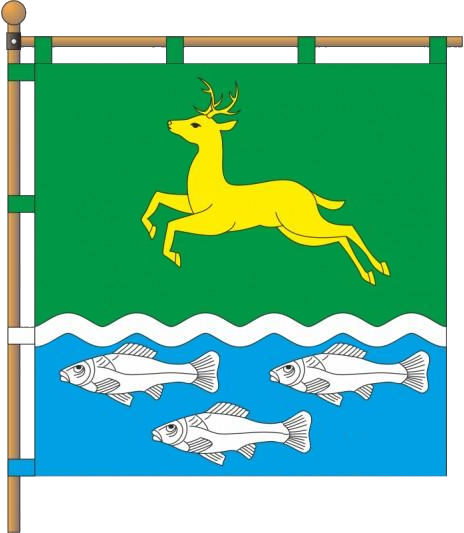
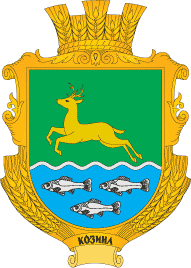
- Flag Coat of arms

- Location in Ternopil Oblast
- Coordinates: 49°17′31.1″N 26°15′05.1″E
- Country: Ukraine
- Oblast: Ternopil Oblast
- Raion: Chortkiv Raion
- Hromada: Hrymailiv settlement hromada
- Time zone: UTC+2 (EET)
  - Summer (DST): UTC+3 (EEST)
- Postal code: 48231

Kozyna (Ukrainian: Козина) is a village in Hrymailiv settlement hromada, Chortkiv Raion, Ternopil Oblast, Ukraine.

== History ==
During the National Liberation Revolution of the Ukrainian people in the mid-17th century and the military operations in 1649, 49 farms were destroyed in Kozyna.

== Religion ==
- Saint Paraskeva church (17th century, wooden; according to legend, the church is much older and has been restored more than once) with a bell tower (16th century, wooden and rebuilt into a stone one) – examples of the Podil school of wooden architecture and architectural monuments of national importance.
- Sculpture of the Mother of God (1884, it is one of only four unique figures in the world that depict the Virgin Mary as pregnant)

== Gallery ==
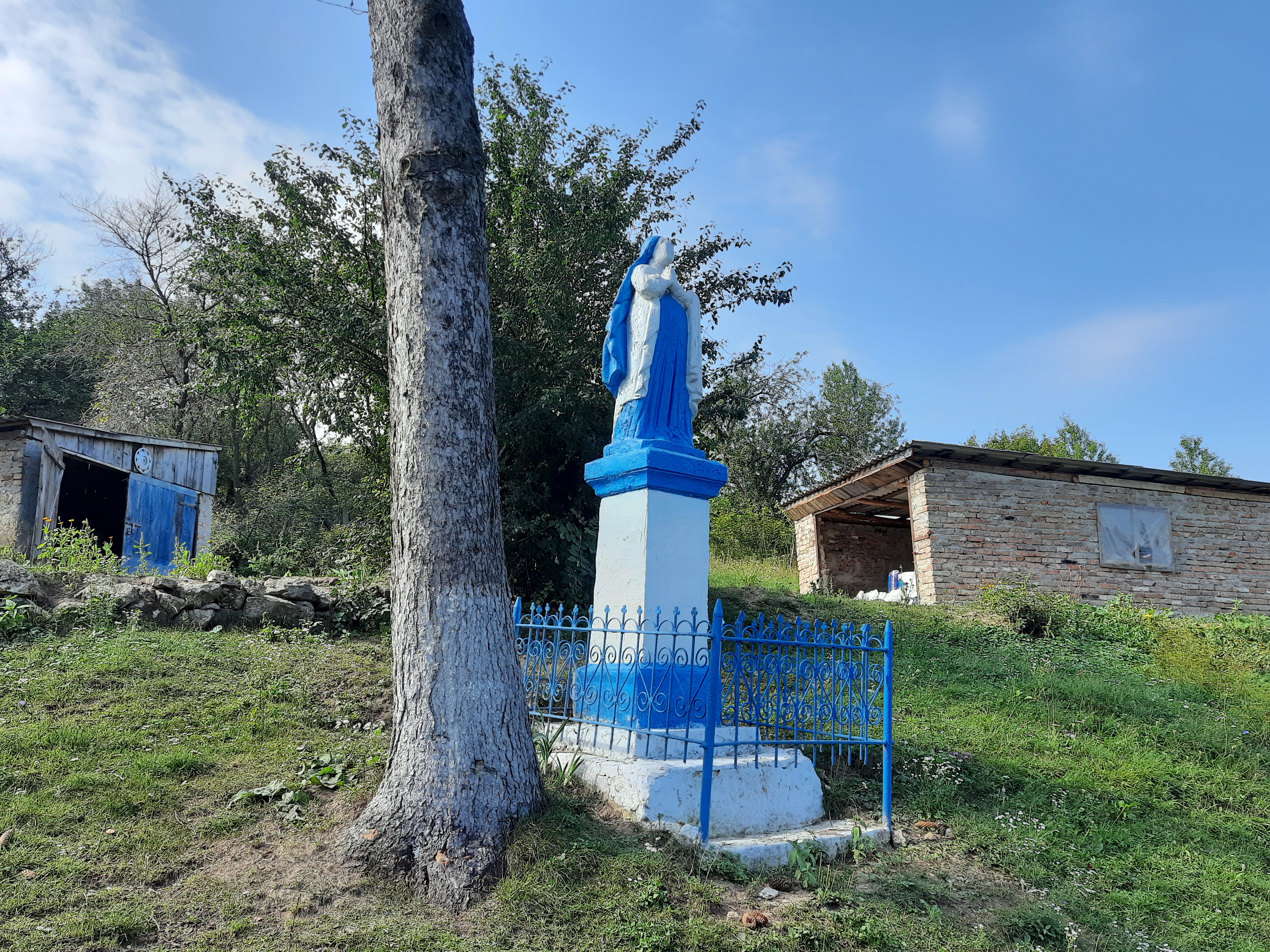
Sculpture of the Mother of God (pregnant)

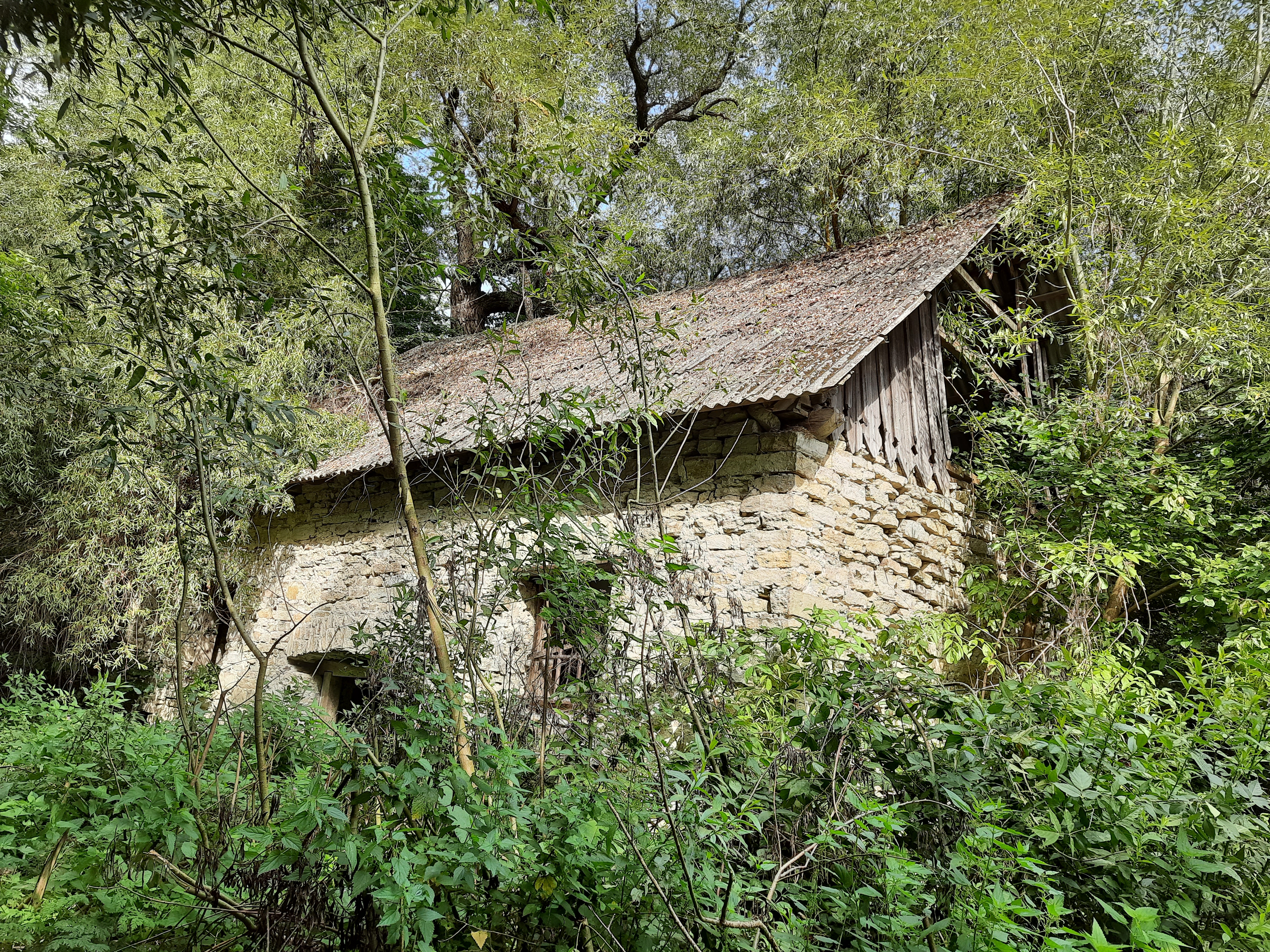
Old water mill on the Zbruch River

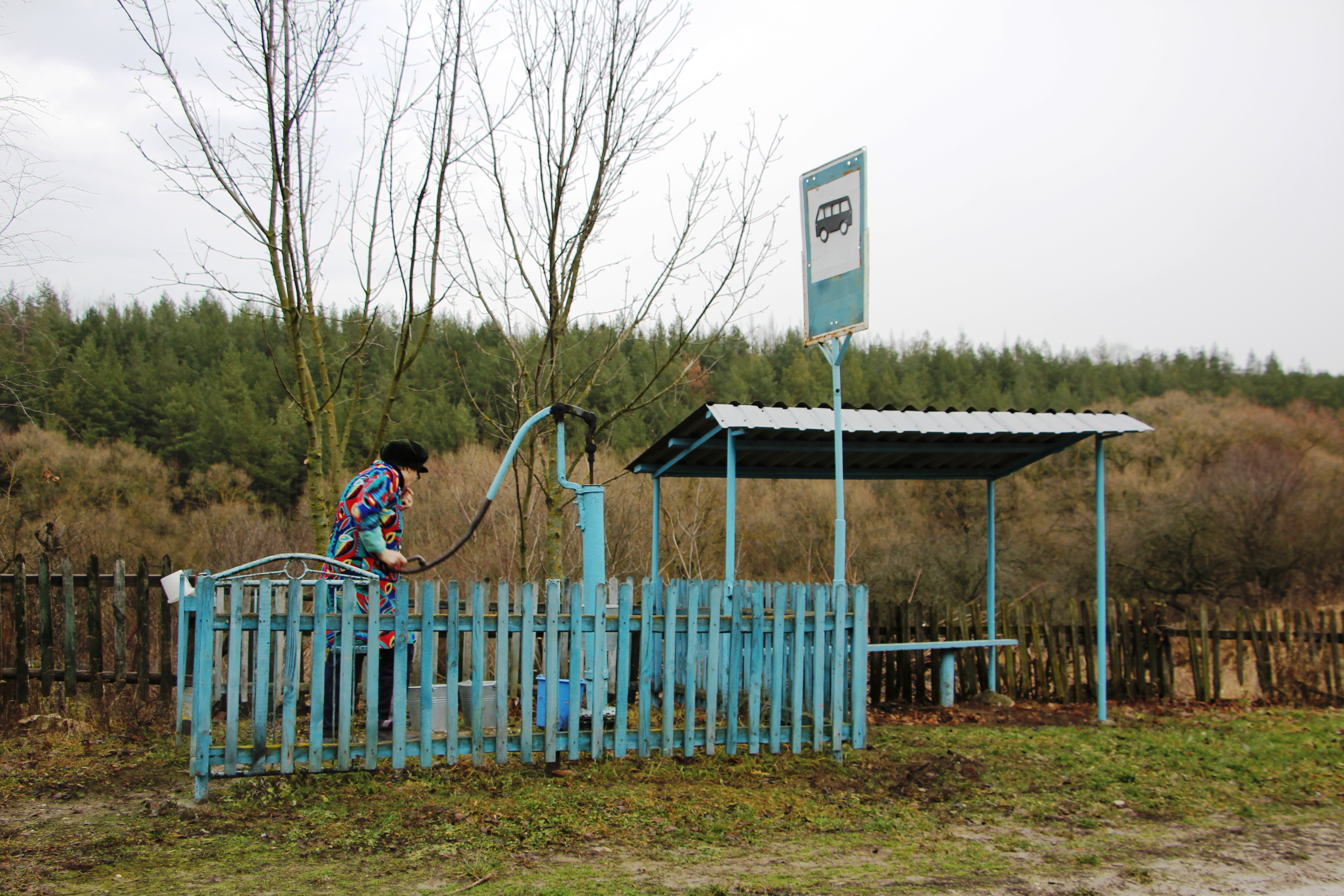
Bus stop
