= Kokoshyntsi =

Rural locality in Ternopil Oblast, Ukraine

Kokoshyntsi Кокошинці
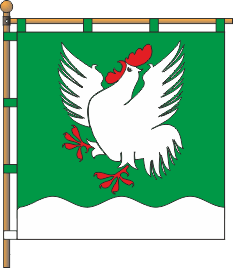
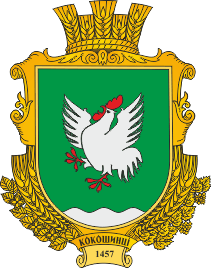
- Flag Coat of arms

- Location in Ternopil Oblast
- Coordinates: 49°19′52″N 26°13′7″E
- Country: Ukraine
- Oblast: Ternopil Oblast
- Raion: Chortkiv Raion
- Hromada: Hrymailiv settlement hromada
- Time zone: UTC+2 (EET)
  - Summer (DST): UTC+3 (EEST)
- Postal code: 48210

Kokoshyntsi (Ukrainian: Кокошинці) is a village in Hrymailiv settlement hromada, Chortkiv Raion, Ternopil Oblast, Ukraine.

== History ==
The first written mention is from 1457.

After the liquidation of the Husiatyn Raion on 19 July 2020, the village became part of the Chortkiv Raion.

== Religion ==
- Saint George church (1873, brick).

== Sources ==
- (in Ukrainian) Задорожний М., Уніят В., Кокошинці // Ternopil Encyclopedic Dictionary: in 4 v. / editorial board: H. Yavorskyi and other, Ternopil: "Zbruch", 2005, V. 2: К—О, S. 135. — ISBN 966-528-199-2.
- "Kokoszyńce". Geographical Dictionary of the Kingdom of Poland (in Polish). 4. Warszawa: Kasa im. Józefa Mianowskiego. 1883. p. 256.
