= Vikno, Ternopil Oblast =

Rural locality in Ternopil Oblast, Ukraine

Vikno Вікно
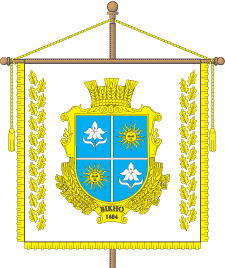
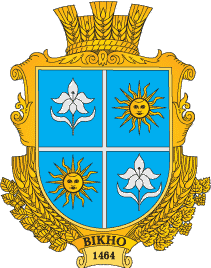
- Flag Coat of arms

- Location in Ternopil Oblast
- Coordinates: 49°20′22″N 26°4′25″E
- Country: Ukraine
- Oblast: Ternopil Oblast
- Raion: Chortkiv Raion
- Hromada: Hrymailiv settlement hromada
- Time zone: UTC+2 (EET)
  - Summer (DST): UTC+3 (EEST)
- Postal code: 48217

Vikno (Ukrainian: Вікно) is a village in Hrymailiv settlement hromada, Chortkiv Raion, Ternopil Oblast, Ukraine. There is a museum of Volodyslav Fedorovych.

== History ==
The first written mention of the village dates back to 1464.

In 1883–1884, at the invitation of the Ukrainian patriotic Ferodovych family, Ivan Franko visited the Vikno, which they owned.

== Religion ==
- There are two churches of the Assumption (1726, 2011; brick)
