= Leon Piniński =

Polish jurist and politician

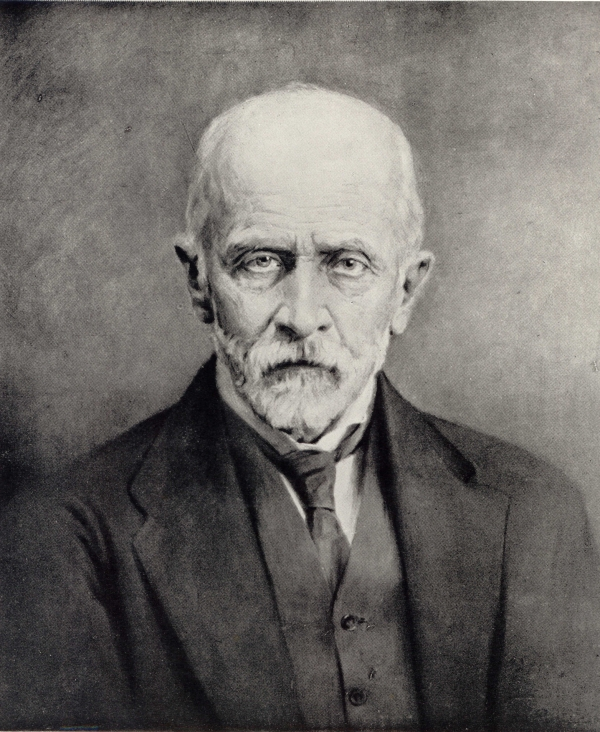
- A 1934 portrait of Piniński by Kazimierz Pochwalski

Statthalter of Galicia-Lodomeria
- In office 31 March 1898 – June 1903
- Monarch: Franz Joseph I
- Preceded by: Eustachy Stanisław Sanguszko
- Succeeded by: Andrzej Kazimierz Potocki

Personal details
- Born: 8 March 1857 Lemberg, Austrian Empire (now Lviv, Ukraine)
- Died: 4 April 1938 (aged 81) Lwów, Poland (now Lviv, Ukraine)
- Education: University of Lwów; University of Leipzig; University of Berlin; University of Vienna

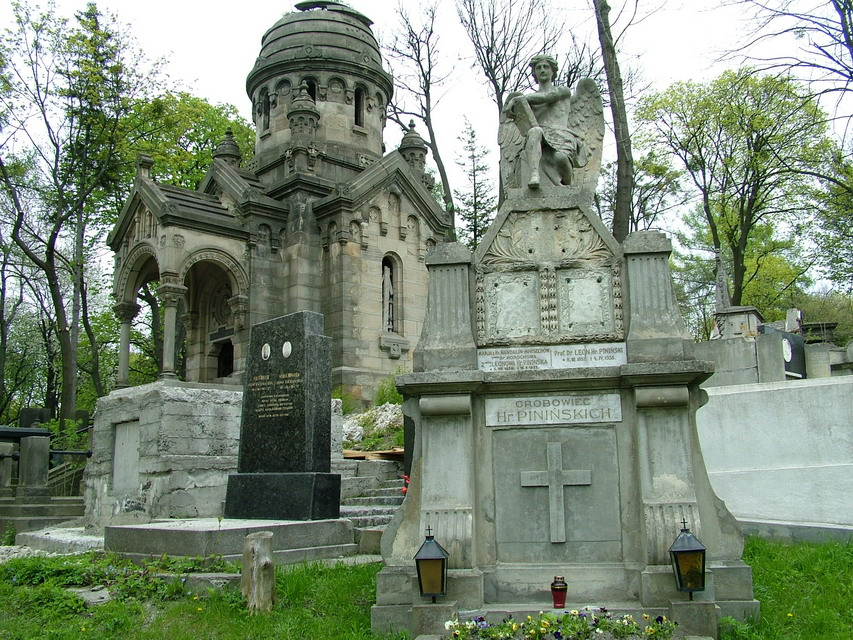
Leon Piniński's tomb at the Lychakiv Cemetery

Leon Jan Piniński (8 March 1857 – 4 April 1938) was a Polish scholar, diplomat, art historian and politician. A professor of Roman law and one-time rector of the Lwów University (1928–1929), he devoted much of his life to a political career in his home city of Lwów (modern Lviv, Ukraine), first under Austria-Hungary then in independent Poland.

== Life ==
Leon Piniński was born in Lwów, then in Austrian-controlled Galicia. A member of the Piniński noble family with the Austrian rank of hrabia - (Count), he was a younger brother of Stanisław whose daughter, Julia Pinińska, inherited the family castle and estate in Grzymałów Hrymailiv. After homeschooling, Leon went on to pass his matura exam at the renowned Jesuit college in Tarnopol. He later graduated from the Faculty of Law at Lwów University. Piniński continued further studies at the universities of Leipzig, Berlin and Vienna. In 1891 he became a professor of Roman law at his alma mater and was elected to membership of the Polish Academy of Arts and Sciences.

A year later he gave up his scholarly career to devote himself to local politics. A member of the Podolacy aristocratic political faction, he became one of the most popular conservative politicians in Lwów. In 1889 he was elected to the Imperial Council in Vienna. In 1894 he was also elected to the Galician Sejm. His terms in both offices ended in 1898, when he became the governor of the Kingdom of Galicia and Lodomeria. During this time he actively opposed the growing popularity of Socialist ideas. He also tried to counter the rise of Ukrainian nationalism. Extremely conservative, in 1903 he was dismissed from office and replaced by the politically liberal industrial mogul, Andrzej Kazimierz Potocki.

Although Piniński retained his seat in the Austro-Hungarian Senate, he retired from public life and devoted himself to advanced studies of law as well as art history. During World War I he briefly returned to politics, but was not as successful as before. Following the rebirth of Poland, Piniński returned to his alma mater as professor of Roman law and lectured on criminal and civil law. In 1928 and 1929 he briefly served as a rector of Lwów University. At the same time, he continued his history of art research and managed to gather an extensive collection of works of art. Most of it he later donated to Wawel Castle Museum and the Ossolineum. A large part of his collection, which included English prints, was later stolen by the Germans during World War II and was never returned to Poland. Piniński himself retired in 1930s and died in Lwów, where he is buried.

== Pretender to the English throne ==
The Piniński family are descended from Charles I of England and a descendant of Leon's brother, Aleksander, Peter Piniński, has voiced such a claim.

== See also ==
- History of Lviv
