= Kazimierz Pochwalski =

Polish painter (1855–1940)

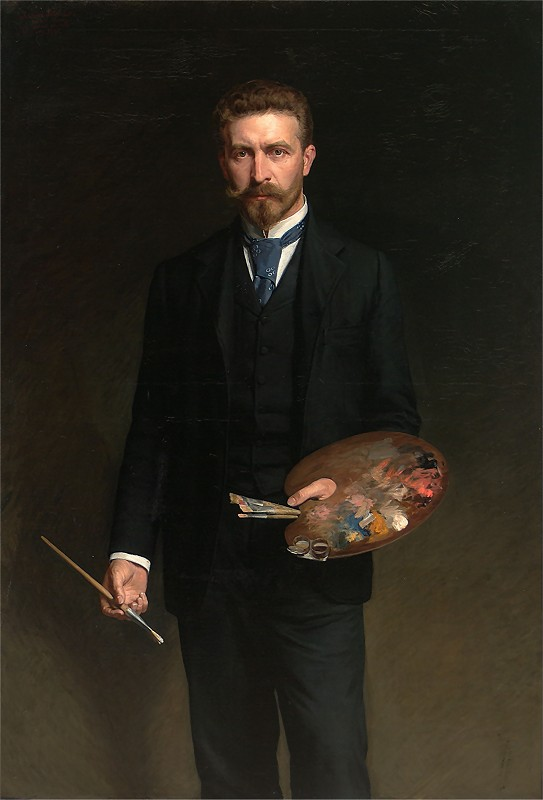
- Self-Portrait with Palette, 1895.
- Born: 25 December 1855; Kraków, Grand Duchy of Kraków, Austrian Empire
- Died: 7 November 1940 (aged 84); Kraków, Poland
- Education: Kraków Academy of Fine Arts; Academy of Fine Arts, Munich
- Occupation: Painter
- Relatives: Władysław Pochwalski (brother)

Kazimierz Teofil Pochwalski (25 December 1855 – 7 November 1940) was a Polish painter known primarily for his portraits, although he produced works in a wide variety of genres.

== Early life ==
Pochwalski was born in Kraków on 25 December 1855 and came from a family that produced several generations of painters and his younger brother Władysław also became a well-known artist. From 1871 to 1879, he studied at the Kraków Academy of Fine Arts under Jan Matejko, then attended the Academy of Fine Arts, Munich, from 1879 to 1888. This was followed by studies in Vienna and Paris, where he was influenced by the work of Léon Bonnat.

== Career ==
He served as Director of the Kraków Society of Friends of Fine Arts and traveled extensively, visiting Greece, Italy, Turkey and Egypt.

From 1893 to 1918, he was a professor at the Academy of Fine Arts in Vienna, where he painted many portraits at the Imperial Court and became a member of the Vienna Secession. He returned to his native Kraków in 1919.

Notable people painted by Pochwalski include Henryk Sienkiewicz, Leon Piniński, Agenor Maria Gołuchowski and Józef Ignacy Kraszewski.

== Gallery ==
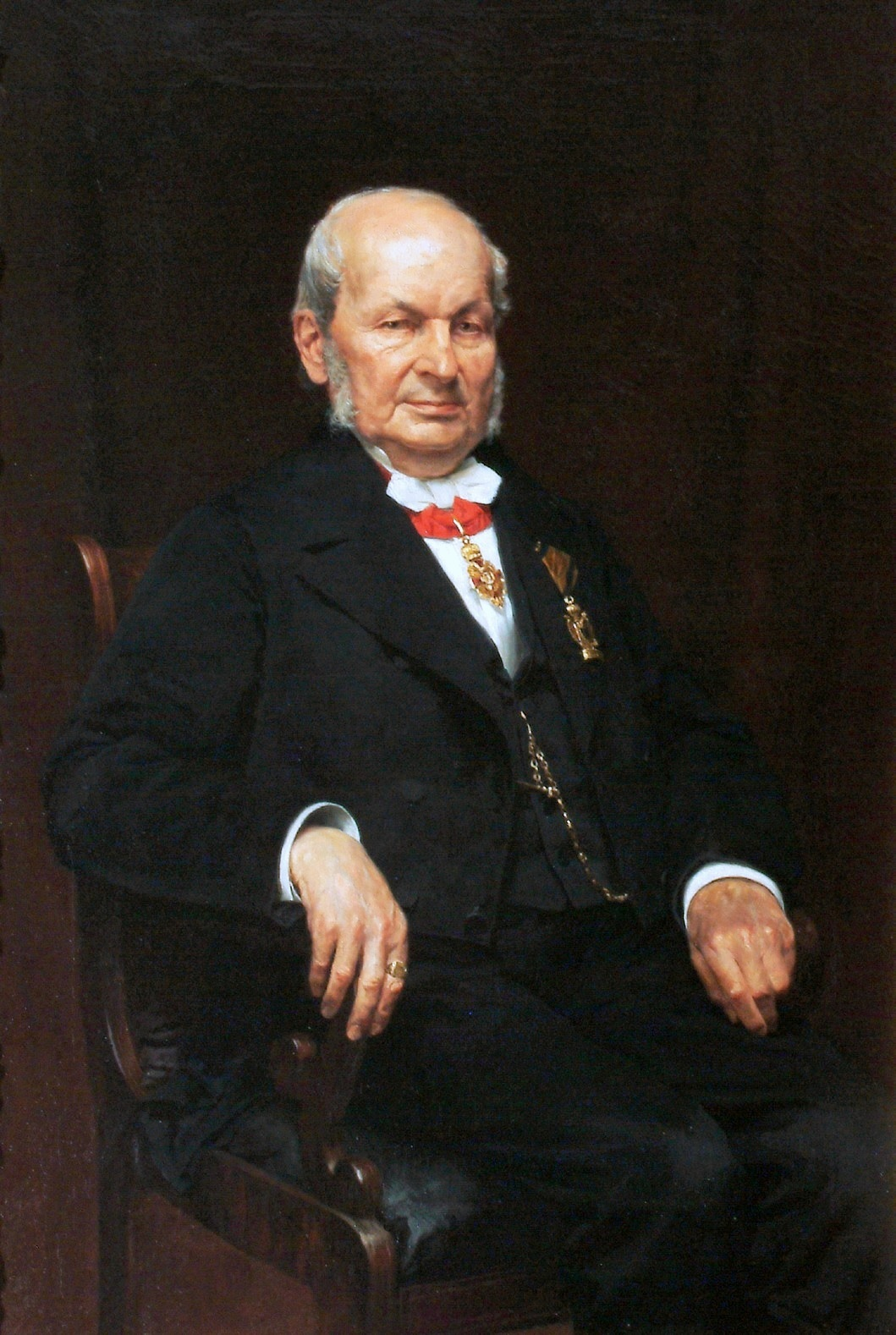
Józef Majer (PAL President), 1891

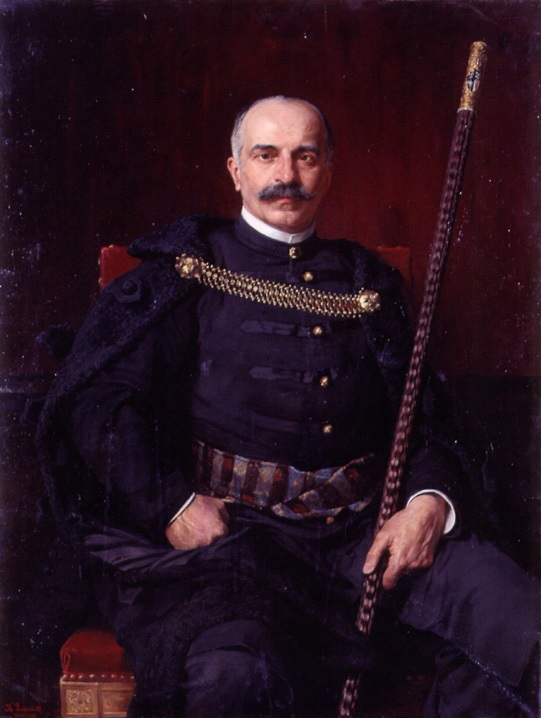
Eustachy Stanisław Sanguszko, 1896, National Museum, Kraków

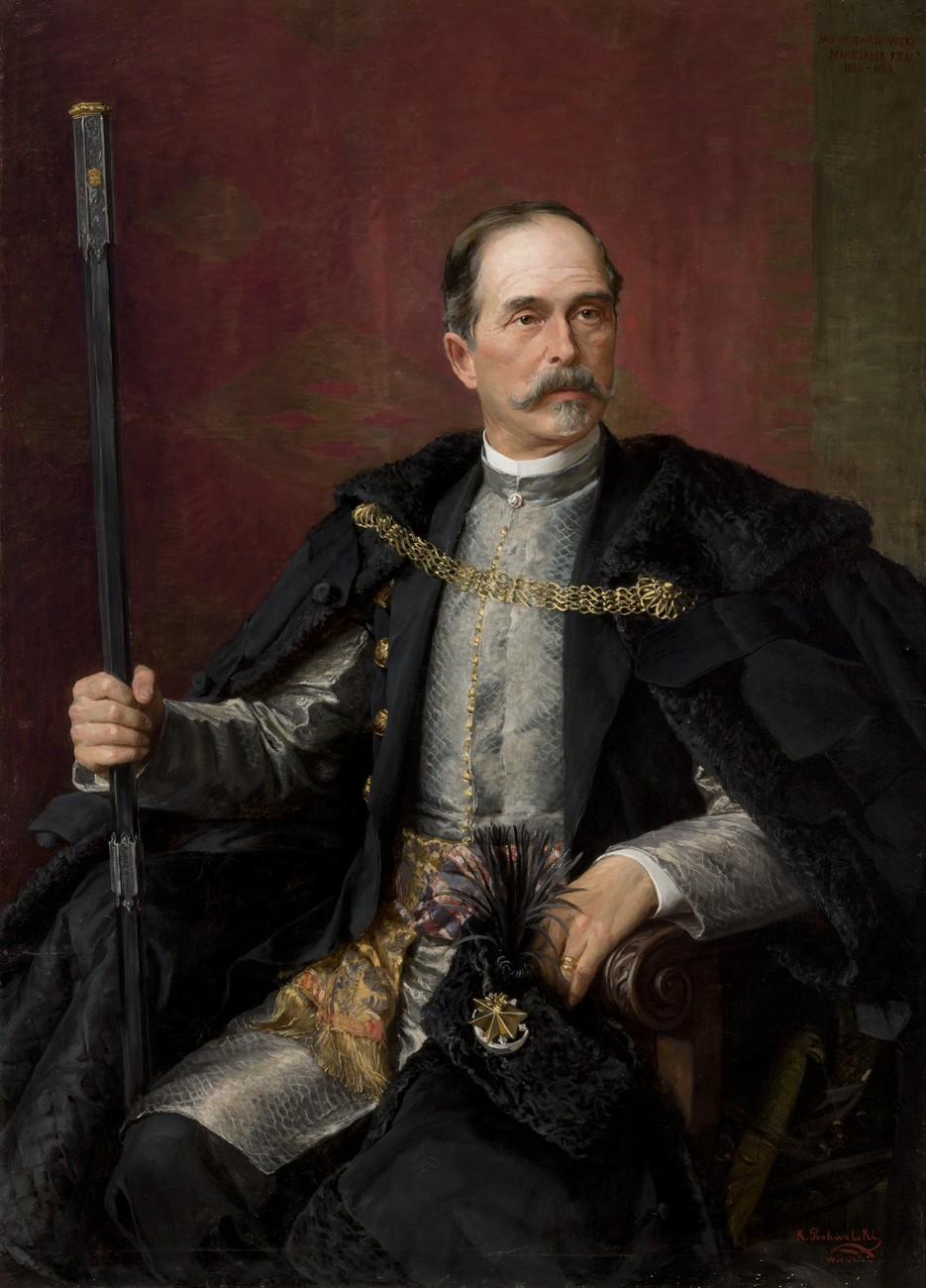
Jan Dzierżysław Tarnowski, after 1890, National Museum, Kraków

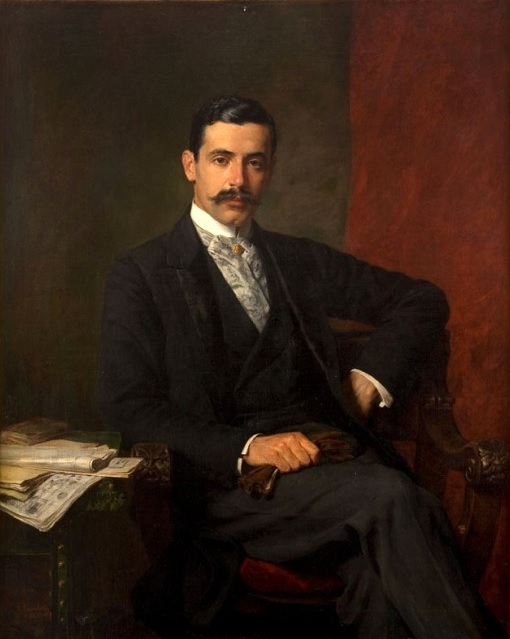
Count Tarnowski, 1898

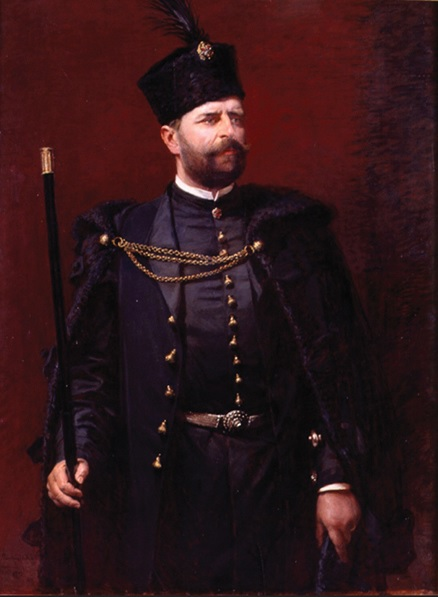
Andrzej Kazimierz Potocki, 1903

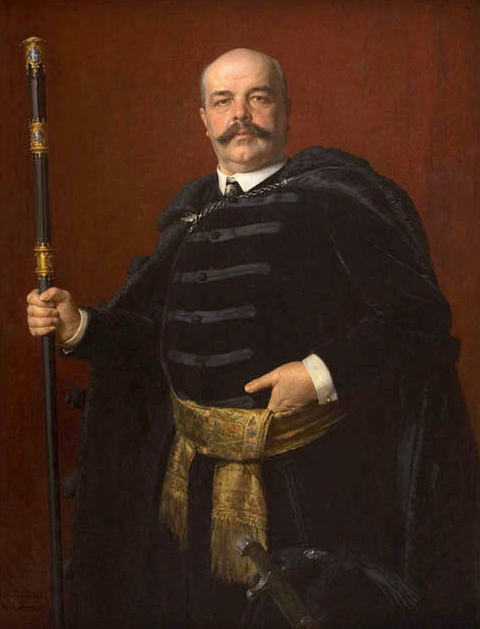
Stanisław Marcin Badeni, 1903, National Museum, Kraków

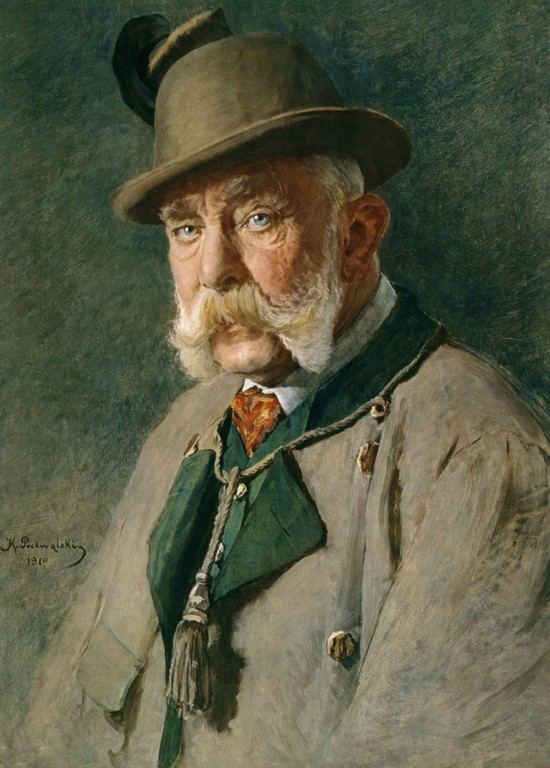
Emperor Franz Joseph I of Austria, 1910

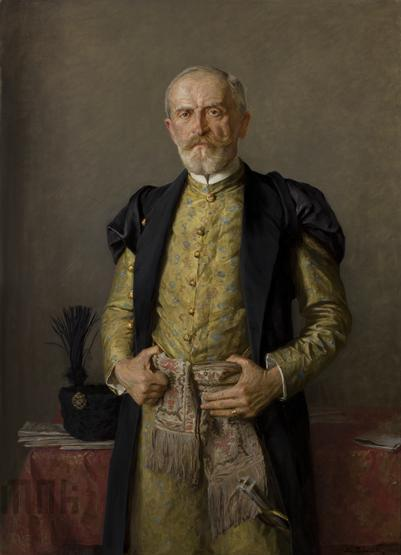
Stanisław Niezabitowski, 1928

== See also ==
- List of Polish painters
