= Władysław Pochwalski =

Polish painter and art restorer

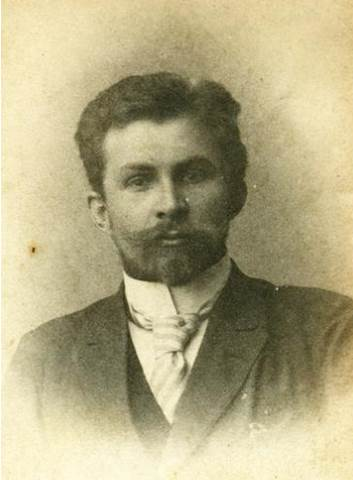
Władysław Pochwalski (1890s)

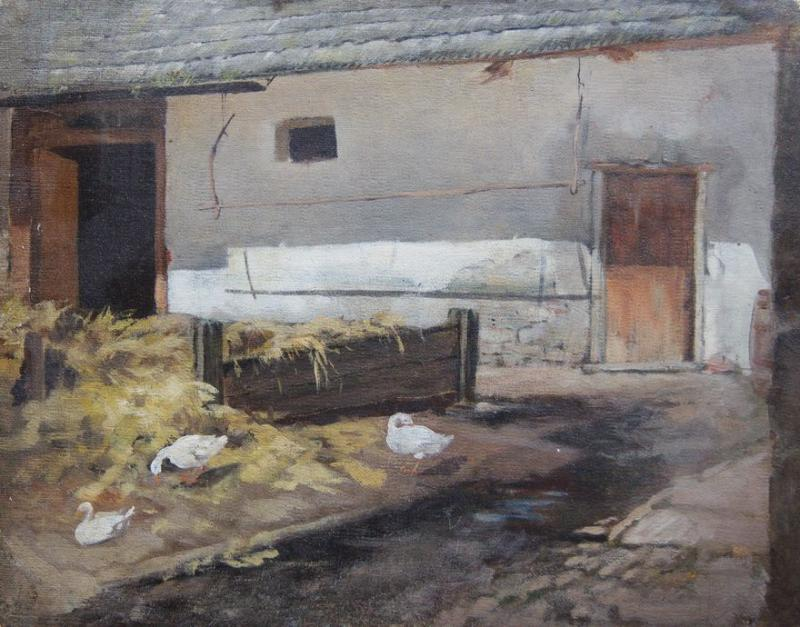
Geese

Władysław Pochwalski (14 April 1860 – 2 November 1924) was a Polish painter and art restorer.

== Biography ==
He was born in Kraków. He came from a family that produced several artists, including his father, Józef Kasper and older brother, Kazimierz. His son, Kasper, also became a painter.

He studied at the Kraków Academy of Fine Arts with Jan Matejko and Władysław Łuszczkiewicz. He began to exhibit locally in 1885 and, in 1887, was commissioned by the Jagiellonian University to do a portrait of Emperor Franz Joseph (destroyed by students in 1918). In 1890, he continued his studies at the Academy of Fine Arts, Munich, under the direction of Alexander von Wagner.

After graduating, he returned home and taught drawing and painting at an academy for young women. He also restored numerous paintings and frescoes, including a large mural that had been almost totally destroyed at St. Andrew's Church, and several items in the chapel at Wawel. After World War I, he restored numerous paintings that had been damaged on the Eastern Front.

In 1907, he founded the city's first major conservation workshop and later became head of the restoration program at the National Museum. He was also one of the founders of the Association of Polish Artists and Designers. He died in 1924, in Kraków.
