= Hrymailiv =

Urban locality in Ternopil Oblast, Ukraine

Hrymailiv Гримайлів Grzymałów
- Rural settlement
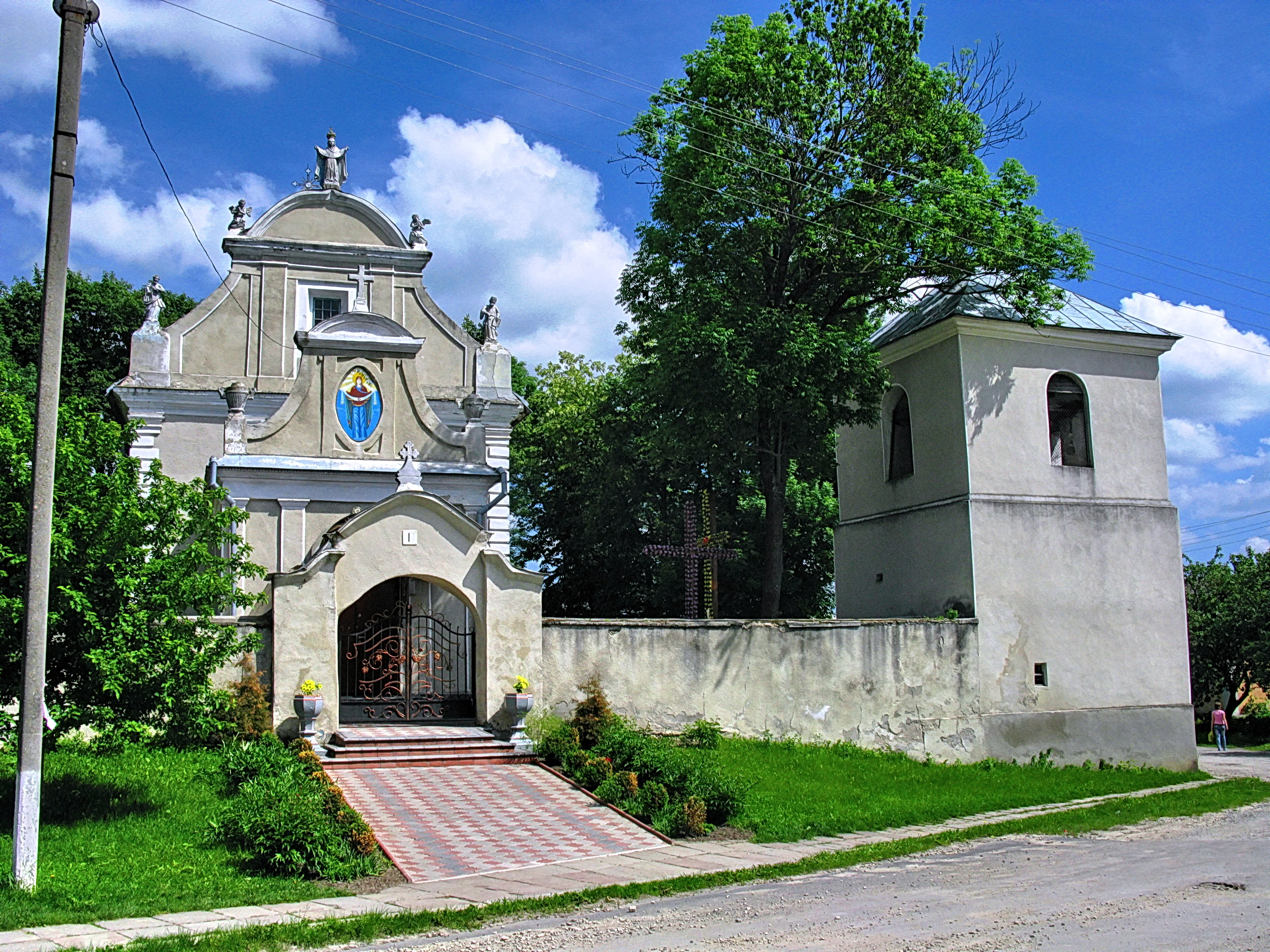

- Coat of arms

- Location of Hrymailiv in Ternopil Oblast Location of Hrymailiv in Ukraine
- Coordinates: 49°19′43″N 26°00′33″E
- Country: Ukraine
- Oblast: Ternopil Oblast
- Raion: Chortkiv Raion
- Founded: 1595
- Town status: 1956

Government
  - Town Head: Olha Prymak

Area
  - Total: 10 km^{2} (3.9 sq mi)
- Elevation: 293 m (961 ft)

Population (2022)
  - Total: 1,753
  - Density: 180/km^{2} (450/sq mi)
- Time zone: UTC+2 (EET)
  - Summer (DST): UTC+3 (EEST)
- Postal code: 48210
- Area code: +380 3557
- Website: http://rada.gov.ua/

Hrymailiv (Ukrainian: Гримайлів; Polish: Grzymałów; Yiddish: רימאלאוו, romanized: Rimalov) is a rural settlement in Chortkiv Raion, Ternopil Oblast, western Ukraine. It hosts the administration of Hrymailiv settlement hromada, one of the hromadas of Ukraine. Population: 1,753 (2022 estimate).

== History ==
Hrymailiv was founded in 1595, and it acquired the status of an urban-type settlement in 1956. It was occupied by the Germans during World War II from 1941–1944. In 1931, its population was approximately 4,074, and about 1,494 of them were Jewish.

The first anti Jewish measures were carried out on July 5, 1941, about 450 Jews were shot and thrown in the lake. On October 12, 1941, 1,700 Jews were sent to the camp in Skalat and executed shortly after. On October 21, 1941 between 1,300 and 1,700 Jews were slaughtered. On November 25, 1941 about 300 Jews from the Hrymailiv camp were sent to other camps such as Hlybochok, Kamianka, Velyki Birky, and others where they were most probably executed afterwards. The remaining 305 Jews were transferred to the Skalat ghetto where they were shot in April, 1942. Overall, about 2,530 people were shot in the Hrymailiv executions.

Until 18 July 2020, Hrymailiv belonged to Husiatyn Raion. The raion was abolished in July 2020 as part of the administrative reform of Ukraine, which reduced the number of raions of Ternopil Oblast to three. The area of Husiatyn Raion was merged into Chortkiv Raion.

Until 26 January 2024, Hrymailiv was designated urban-type settlement. On this day, a new law entered into force which abolished this status, and Hrymailiv became a rural settlement.

== Monuments ==
- Hrymailiv Castle

== People from Hrymailiv ==
- Ivan Pulyui (1845-1918), Ukrainian physicist, inventor and patriot who was an early developer of the use of X-rays for medical imaging.
- Jakob Altenberg (1875–1944), who moved to Vienna as a young man and eventually became a seller of Hitler's paintings (1909–13).
- Juliusz Hibner (1912–1994), brigadier general in the Polish People's Army, recipient of the title of Hero of the Soviet Union
