= Tovste (village) =

Rural locality in Ternopil Oblast, Ukraine

Tovste Товсте
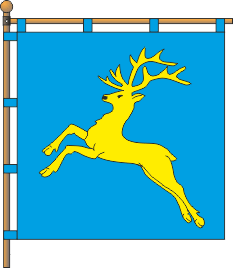
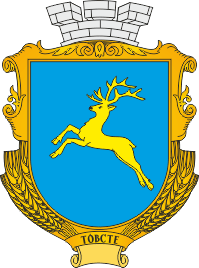
- Flag Coat of arms

- Location in Ternopil Oblast
- Coordinates: 49°16′25″N 26°5′30″E
- Country: Ukraine
- Oblast: Ternopil Oblast
- Raion: Chortkiv Raion
- Hromada: Hrymailiv settlement hromada
- Time zone: UTC+2 (EET)
  - Summer (DST): UTC+3 (EEST)
- Postal code: 48232

Tovste (Ukrainian: Товсте) is a village in Hrymailiv settlement hromada, Chortkiv Raion, Ternopil Oblast, Ukraine.

== History ==
The first written mention dates back to the 1420s.

After the liquidation of the Husiatyn Raion on 19 July 2020, the village became part of the Chortkiv Raion.

== Religion ==
- Church of St. John the Baptist (1770, brick, OCU);
- Roman Catholic Church (circa 1720, built at the expense of Adam Mikołaj Sieniawski).

== Sources ==
- (in Ukrainian) Бігус М., Грунтас Г., Мельничук Б., Товсте // Ternopil Encyclopedic Dictionary: in 4 v. / editorial board: H. Yavorskyi and other, Ternopil: "Zbruch", 2008, V. 3: П—Я, S. 455–456. — ISBN 978-966-528-279-2.
- "Touste". Geographical Dictionary of the Kingdom of Poland (in Polish). 12. Warszawa: Kasa im. Józefa Mianowskiego. 1892. p. 433.
