= Hrymailiv settlement hromada =

Hromada in Ternopil Oblast, Ukraine

Hrymailiv settlement hromada Гримайлівська селищна громада
- hromada
- Seal

- Location within Ternopil Oblast Location within Ukraine
- Coordinates: 49°19′43″N 26°00′33″E
- Country: Ukraine
- Oblast: Ternopil Oblast
- Raion: Chortkiv Raion
- Administrative center: Hrymailiv

Government
  - Hromada head: Mykola Sidliar

Area
  - Total: 339.9 km^{2} (131.2 sq mi)

Population (2022)
  - Total: 9,334
- Urban-type settlement: 1
- Villages: 24
- Website: grymaylivska-gromada.gov.ua

Hrymailiv settlement hromada (Ukrainian: Гримайлівська селищна територіальна громада, romanized: Hrymailivska selyshchna terytorialna hromada is a hromada in Ukraine, in Chortkiv Raion of Ternopil Oblast. The administrative center is the urban-type settlement of Hrymailiv. Its population is 9,334 (2022 estimate)

== History ==
It was formed on 2 September 2016 by the merger of Hrymailiv settlement council and Lezhanivka village council of Husiatyn Raion.

== Settlements ==
The hromada consists of 1 urban-type settlement (Hrymailiv) and 24 villages:

- Bilynivka
- Butsyky
- Vikno
- Volytsia
- Hlibiv
- Zelene
- Kalaharivka
- Kozyna
- Kokoshyntsi
- Krasne
- Krutyliv
- Kut
- Lezhanivka
- Mala Luka
- Mali Birky
- Monastyrykha
- Novosilka
- Olenivka
- Paivka
- Piznanka
- Rashtivtsi
- Sadzhivka
- Stavky
- Tovste
