= Husiatyn Raion =

Former subdivision of Ternopil Oblast, Ukraine

Husiatyn Raion Гусятинський район
- Raion
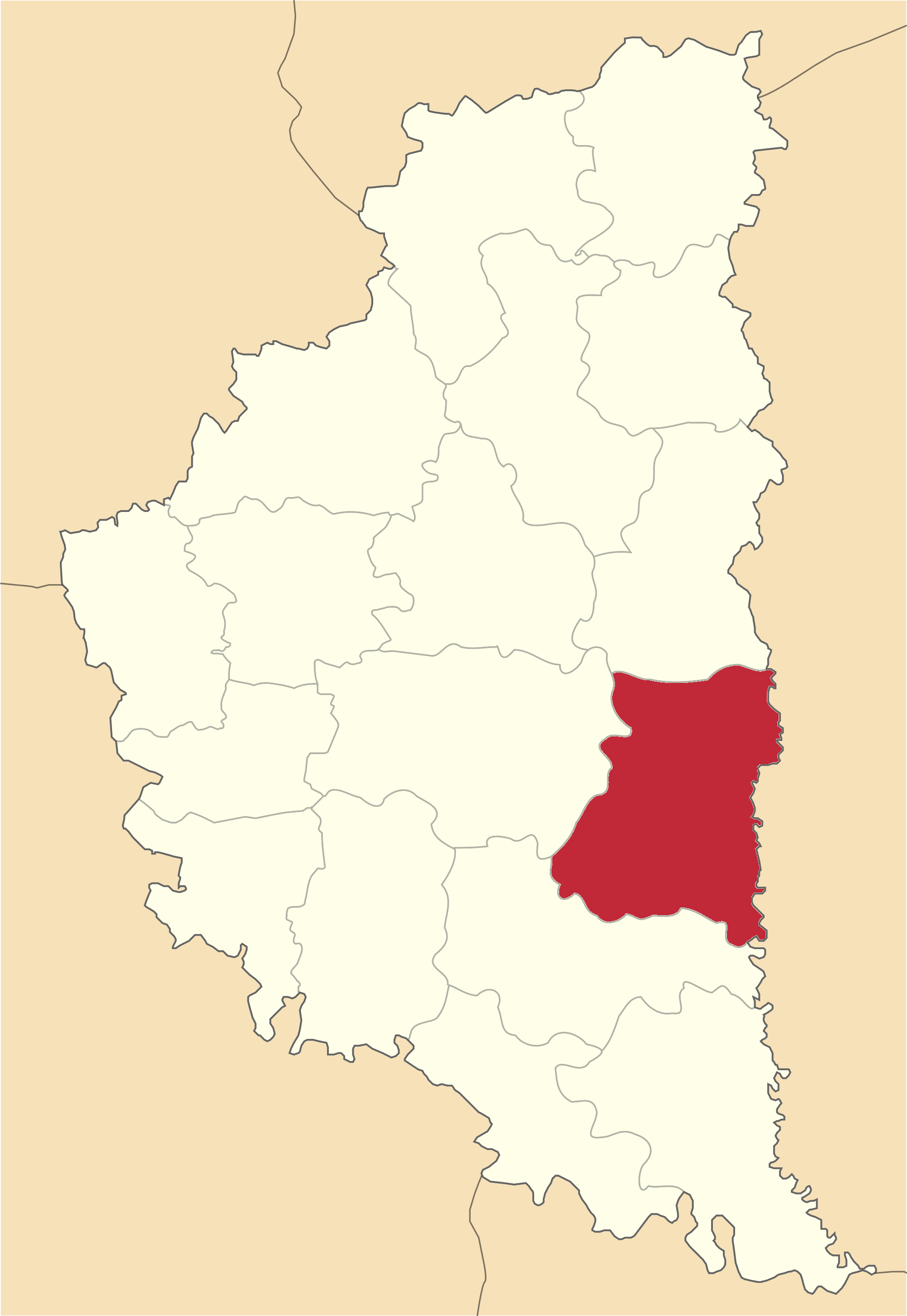
- Coordinates: 49°10′N 26°00′E
- Country: Ukraine
- Oblast: Ternopil Oblast
- Disestablished: 18 July 2020
- Admin. center: Husiatyn
- Subdivisions: List: — city councils; — settlement councils; — rural councils; Number of localities: — cities; — urban-type settlements; 61 — villages; — rural settlements

Area
  - Total: 1,016 km^{2} (392 sq mi)

Population (2020)
  - Total: 57,964
  - Density: 57.05/km^{2} (147.8/sq mi)
- Time zone: UTC+02:00 (EET)
  - Summer (DST): UTC+03:00 (EEST)
- Area code: 380-3557

Husiatyn Raion (Ukrainian: Гусятинський район) was a raion (district) in Ternopil Oblast in western Ukraine. Its administrative center was the urban-type settlement of Husiatyn. The raion was abolished on 18 July 2020 as part of the administrative reform of Ukraine, which reduced the number of raions of Ternopil Oblast to three. The area of Husiatyn Raion was merged into Chortkiv Raion. The last estimate of the raion population was 57,964 (2020 est.).

At the time of disestablishment, the raion consisted of five hromadas:

- Hrymailiv settlement hromada with the administration in the urban-type settlement of Hrymailiv;
- Husiatyn settlement hromada with the administration in Husiatyn;
- Khorostkiv urban hromada with the administration in the city of Khorostkiv;
- Kopychyntsi urban hromada with the administration in the city of Kopychyntsi;
- Vasylkivtsi rural hromada with the administration in the selo of Vasylkivtsi.

== See also ==
- Subdivisions of Ukraine
