= Chornokinetska Volia =

Rural locality in Ternopil Oblast, Ukraine

Chornokinetska Volia Чорнокінецька Воля
- Location in Ternopil Oblast
- Coordinates: 48°56′49″N 26°4′47″E
- Country: Ukraine
- Oblast: Ternopil Oblast
- Raion: Chortkiv Raion
- Hromada: Kolyndiany Hromada
- Time zone: UTC+2 (EET)
  - Summer (DST): UTC+3 (EEST)
- Postal code: 48509

Chornokinetska Volia (Ukrainian: Чорнокінецька Воля) is a village in Ukraine, Ternopil Oblast, Chortkiv Raion, Kolyndiany rural hromada.

== History ==
The first written mention dates back to 1654.

Since 29 July 2015, they have belonged to the Kolyndiany rural hromada.

== Religion ==
- Church of Nativity of Virgin Mary (transported in 1763 from the town, now Skala-Podilska, Chortkiv Raion, wooden; new, stone, 2004)
