= Ivanna Synenka-Ivanytska =

Ukrainian opera singer (1897–1988)

- Іванна Синенька-Іваницька
- Born: 24 July 1897; Velyki Chornokintsi, now Chortkiv Raion, Ternopil Oblast, Ukraine
- Died: 28 August 1988 (aged 91); Munich, Germany
- Education: Prague Conservatory
- Occupation: Opera singer

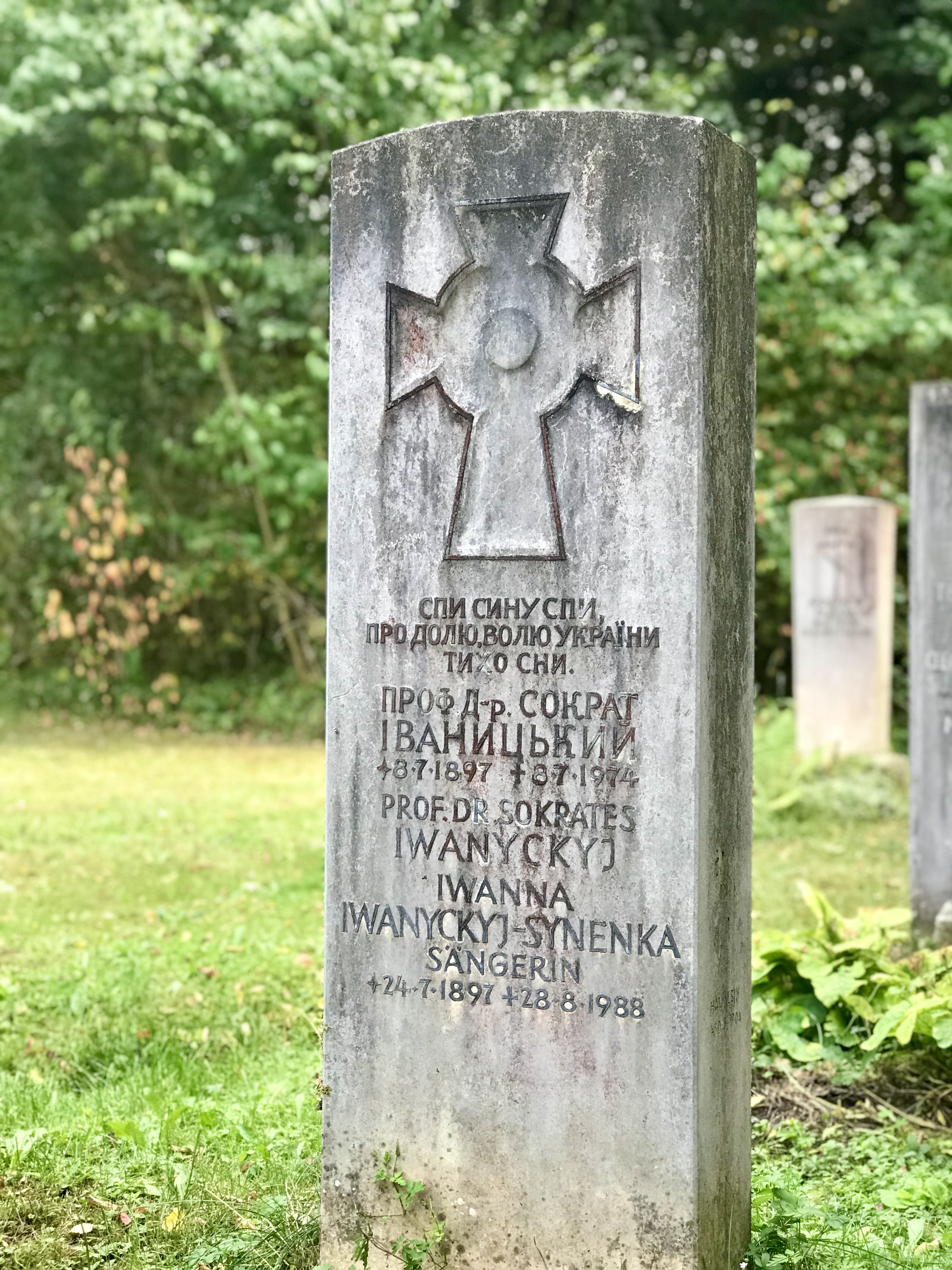
Tombstone of Ivanna Synenka-Ivanytska's grave in Munich, Waldfriedhof cemetery.

Ivanna Synenka-Ivanytska (Ukrainian: Іванна Синенька-Іваницька; (24 July 1897 – 1 September 1988) was a Ukrainian opera singer. She was the wife of Sokrat Ivanytskyi.

== Biography ==
Ivanna Synenka-Ivanytska was born on 24 July 1897, in Velyki Chornokintsi, which is now part of the Kolyndiany rural hromada in the Chortkiv Raion of Ternopil Oblast, Ukraine.

In 1921, she graduated from the teacher's seminary, and in 1926, she graduated from the Prague Conservatory, studying in the class of D. Brambergová.

During the periods of 1927–1929 and 1932–1933, she was a soloist at the Ukrainian Theater of the "Prosvita" society in Uzhhorod. In 1929-1930, she toured with concerts throughout Halychyna (Galicia) and Bukovyna. Subsequently, in 1930–1931, she perfected her vocal skills with lessons at a private school in Milan, Italy (class of K. Rivalti). From 1934 to 1938, she recorded Ukrainian songs for radio in Prague, Lviv, and Vienna. Starting in 1937, she gave concerts in cities across Austria, Germany, France, and Czechoslovakia.

She died on 1 September 1988, in Munich, Germany.

== Roles ==
Notable opera roles included:

- Mařenka in B. Smetana The Bartered Bride,
- Violetta and Leonora in G. Verdi La traviata and La forza del destino,
- Oksana in S. Hulak-Artemovskyi Zaporozhets za Dunayem,
- Butterfly in G. Puccini Madama Butterfly,
- Kateryna in M. Arkas Kateryna,
- Micaëla in G. Bizet Carmen,
- Natalka in M. Lysenko Natalka Poltavka.

The assessment by the composer Stanislav Lyudkevych is that the singer is the owner of a "soft, silky timbre, and at the same time a ringing vocal material, leveled across all registers, a natural noble line in dynamics and modulation, a discreet, yet intensive and expressive, almost theatrical interpretation, impeccable diction and phrasing – all this together with a sympathetic appearance formed a rarely encountered integrity".

== Bibliography ==
- Медведик П. Діячі української музичної культури: Мат. до біобібліогр. слов. // Зап. НТШ: Пр. Музикозн. комісії. Л., 1993. Т. 232.
- Білокінь С. Іванна Синенька-Іваницька. К., 1997.
- Сохацька Є. І. Доля Іванни Синенької-Іваницької — вихованки Огієнкового дітища (1918–1920) // Мат. 20-ї Поділ. істор.-краєзн. конф. Кам’янець-Подільський, 2000.
