= Davydkivtsi, Ternopil Oblast =

Rural locality in Ternopil Oblast, Ukraine

Davydkivtsi Давидківці
- Location in Ternopil Oblast
- Coordinates: 48°56′10″N 25°59′32″E
- Country: Ukraine
- Oblast: Ternopil Oblast
- Raion: Chortkiv Raion
- Hromada: Kolyndiany Hromada
- Time zone: UTC+2 (EET)
  - Summer (DST): UTC+3 (EEST)
- Postal code: 48553

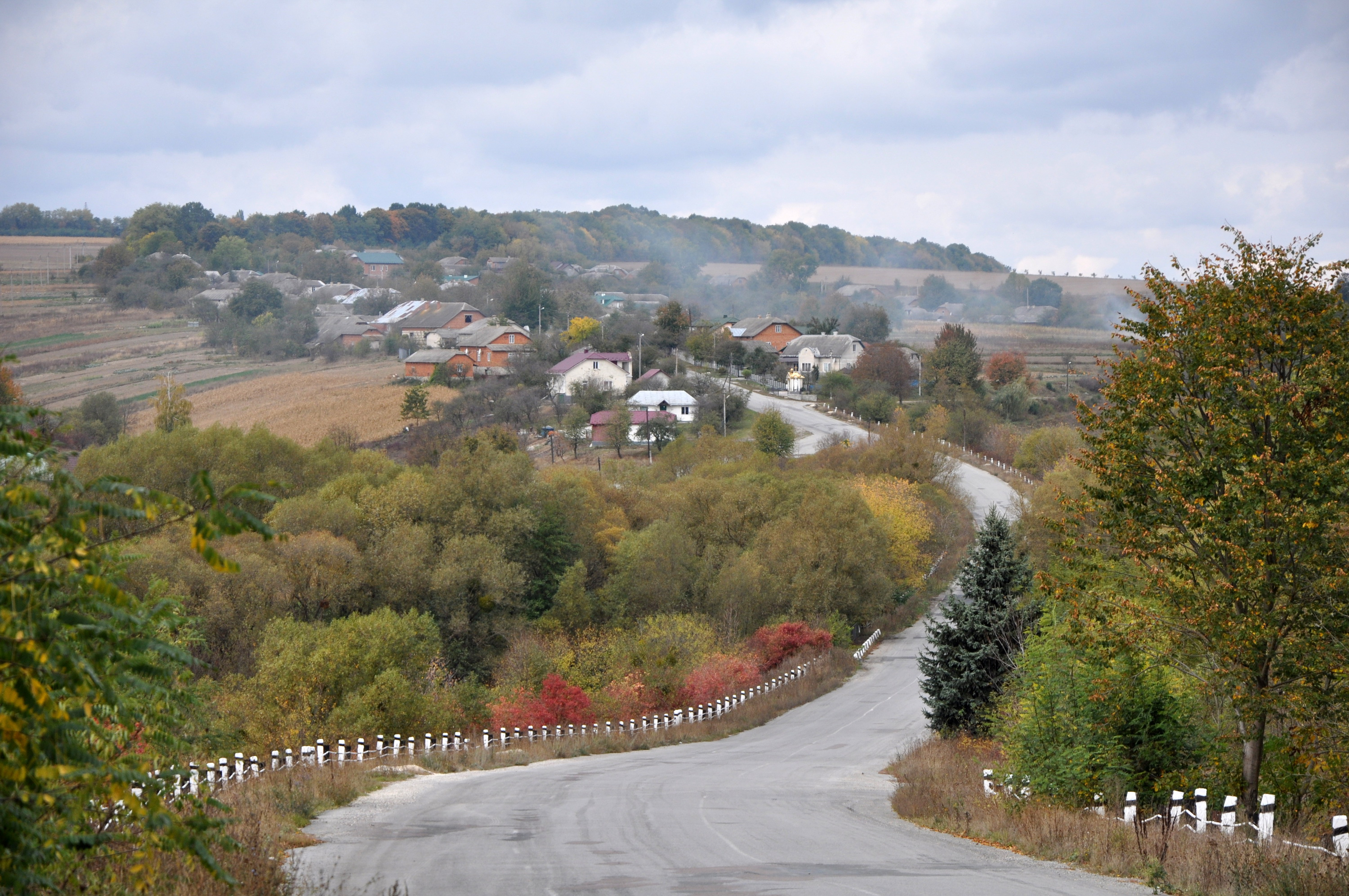
Davydkivtsi

Davydkivtsi (Ukrainian: Давидківці) is a village in Ukraine, Ternopil Oblast, Chortkiv Raion, Kolyndiany rural hromada.

== History ==
The first written mention is from 1552.

Since 29 July 2015, they have belonged to the Kolyndiany rural hromada.

== Religion ==
- Church of John the Baptist (1905, brick, OCU)
