= Tarnavka, Ternopil Oblast =

Rural locality in Ternopil Oblast, Ukraine

Tarnavka Тарнавка
- Location in Ternopil Oblast
- Coordinates: 48°54′38″N 26°0′10″E
- Country: Ukraine
- Oblast: Ternopil Oblast
- Raion: Chortkiv Raion
- Hromada: Kolyndiany Hromada
- Time zone: UTC+2 (EET)
  - Summer (DST): UTC+3 (EEST)
- Postal code: 48517

Tarnavka (Ukrainian: Тарнавка) is a village in Ukraine, Ternopil Oblast, Chortkiv Raion, Kolyndiany rural hromada.

== History ==
The first written mention dates back to 1785.

Since 29 July 2015, they have belonged to the Kolyndiany rural hromada.

== Religion ==
Churches in the village include the Church of the Presentation of the Blessed Virgin Mary (1903, brick, UGCC) and a Roman Catholic Church.
