= Skala-Podilska Castle =

Castle in Skala-Podilska, Ternopil Oblast, Ukraine

- Скала-Подільський замок
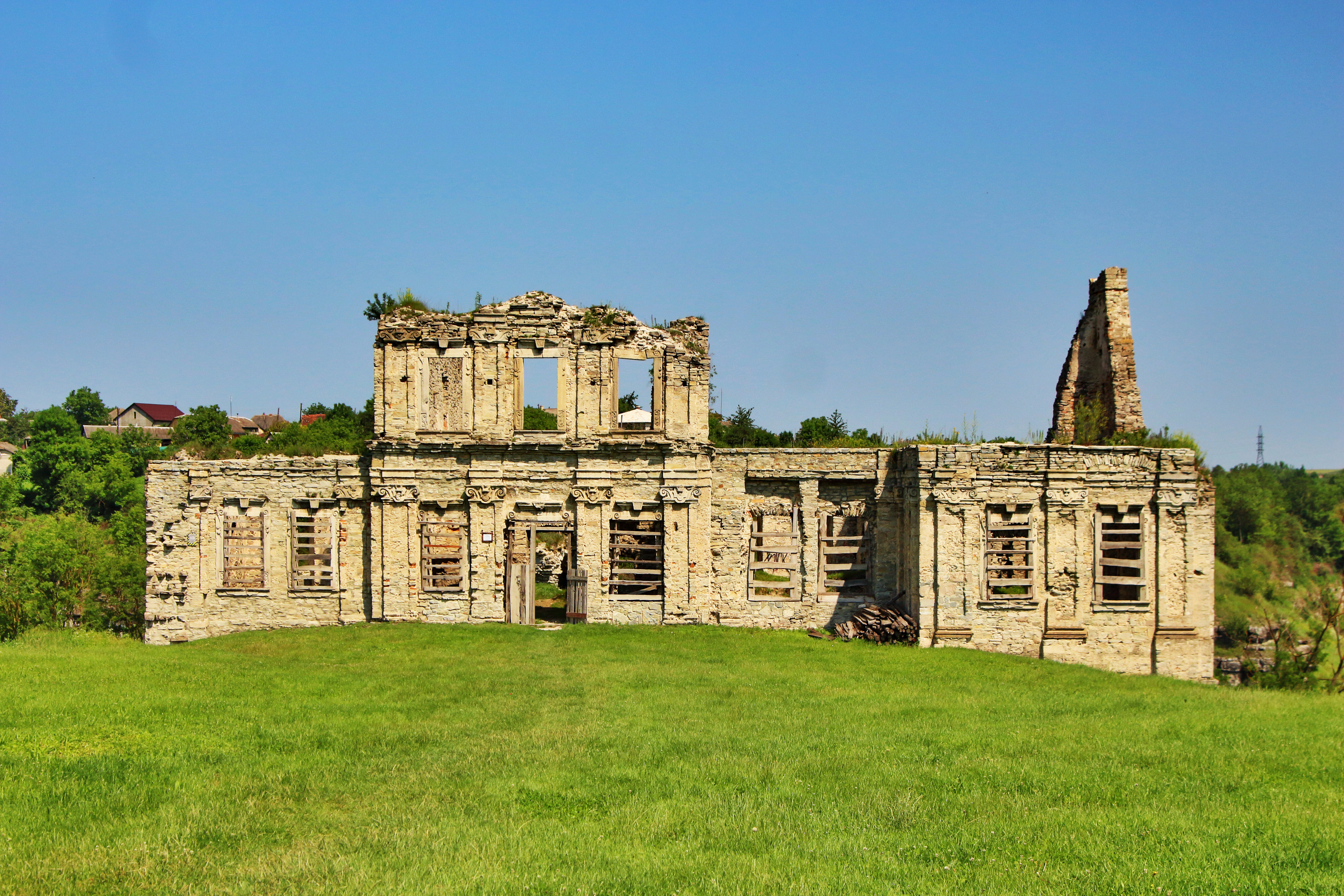
- Ruins of the Tarło palace in the courtyard

General information
- Status: Architectural monument of national importance
- Location: Skala-Podilska, Chortkiv Raion, Ternopil Oblast, Ukraine
- Coordinates: 48°51′24.6″N 26°11′57.2″E

Immovable Monument of National Significance of Ukraine
- Official name: Замок (Castle)
- Type: Architecture
- Reference no.: 190019

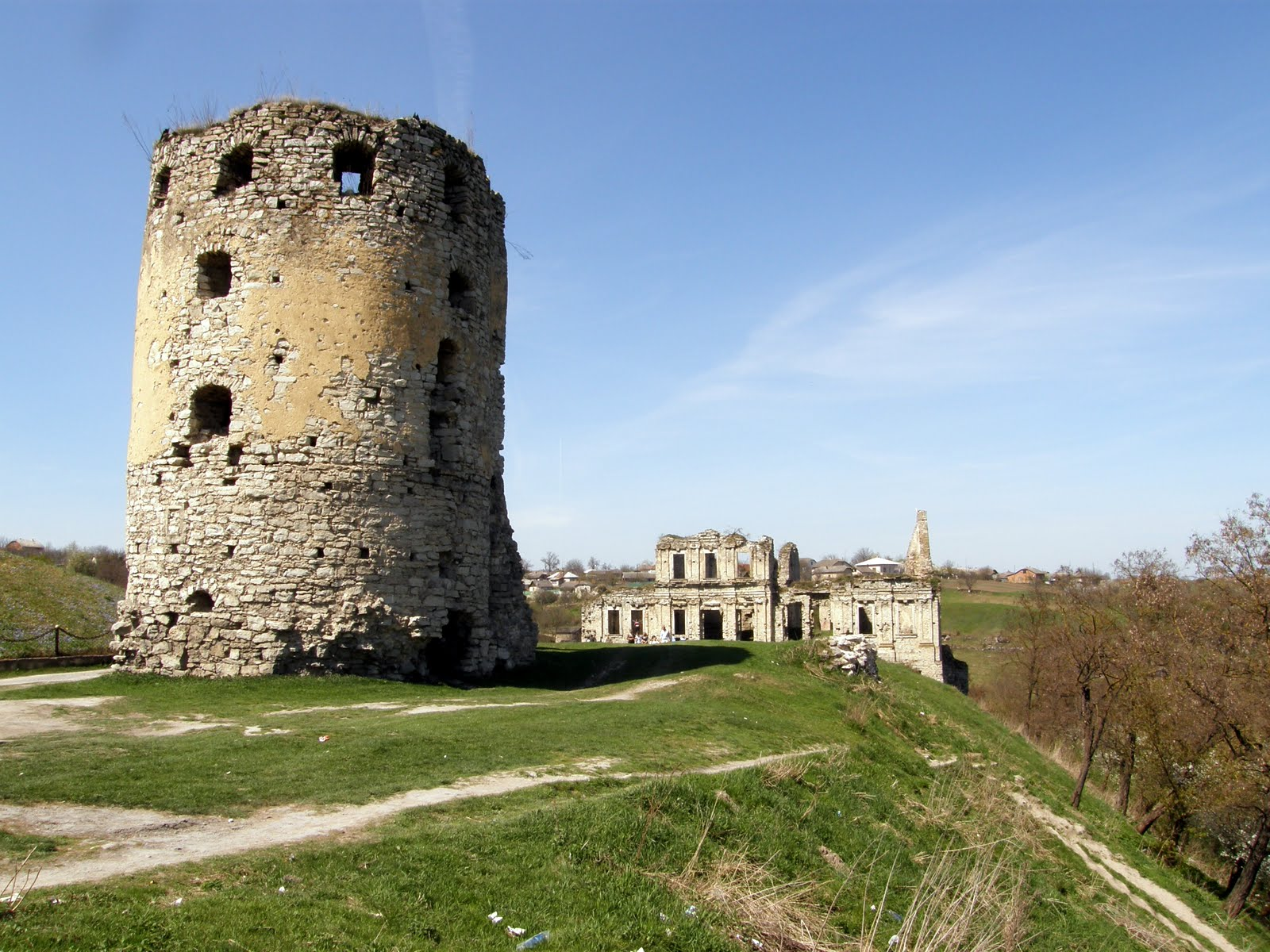
Castle

The Skala-Podilska Castle (Ukrainian: Скала-Подільський замок, romanized: Skala-Podil'skyi zamok) it is located Skala-Podilska of the Ternopil Oblast, above a ravine of the Zbruch River, on a rocky promontory accessible only from the south. It is an architectural monument of national significance.

== History ==
The castle was erected in the 14th century by the family of the Prince Koriatowiczów. Then, after 1515, it was significantly expanded by Stanislaw Lanckoroński of Brzezie (1465–1535) of Zadora coat of arms, starosta of Kamieniec, later Sandomierz voivode at the behest of King Sigismund I the Old. The Lanckoronski family owned the castle until 1706. Then the owners were the Tarłows. All that remains of the castle, which occupied the entire promontory, is a massive 16th-century tower, standing at the base of the promontory.

== Palace ==
The ruins of the two-story Tarłow palace, which divided the castle courtyard into two parts: the larger southern part and the smaller northern part, where the remains of the oldest part of the castle are located. In 1914. The Gołuchowskis built a new one-story palace on a different site.

== Bibliography ==
- (in Ukrainian) Бойко В., Парацій В., Скала-Подільський замок // Ternopil Encyclopedic Dictionary: in 4 v. / editorial board: H. Yavorskyi and other, Ternopil: "Zbruch", 2008, V. 3: П—Я, S. 271. — ISBN 978-966-528-279-2.
- Ukraina zachodnia: tam szum Prutu, Czeremoszu..., zespół red. A. Strojny, K. Bzowski, A. Grossman. Kraków: Wyd. Bezdroża, 2005, s. 283. ISBN 83-921981-6-6.
