= Velyki Chornokintsi =

Rural locality in Ternopil Oblast, Ukraine

Velyki Chornokintsi Великі Чорнокінці
- Location in Ternopil Oblast
- Coordinates: 48°58′12″N 26°1′48″E
- Country: Ukraine
- Oblast: Ternopil Oblast
- Raion: Chortkiv Raion
- Hromada: Kolyndiany Hromada
- Time zone: UTC+2 (EET)
  - Summer (DST): UTC+3 (EEST)
- Postal code: 48524

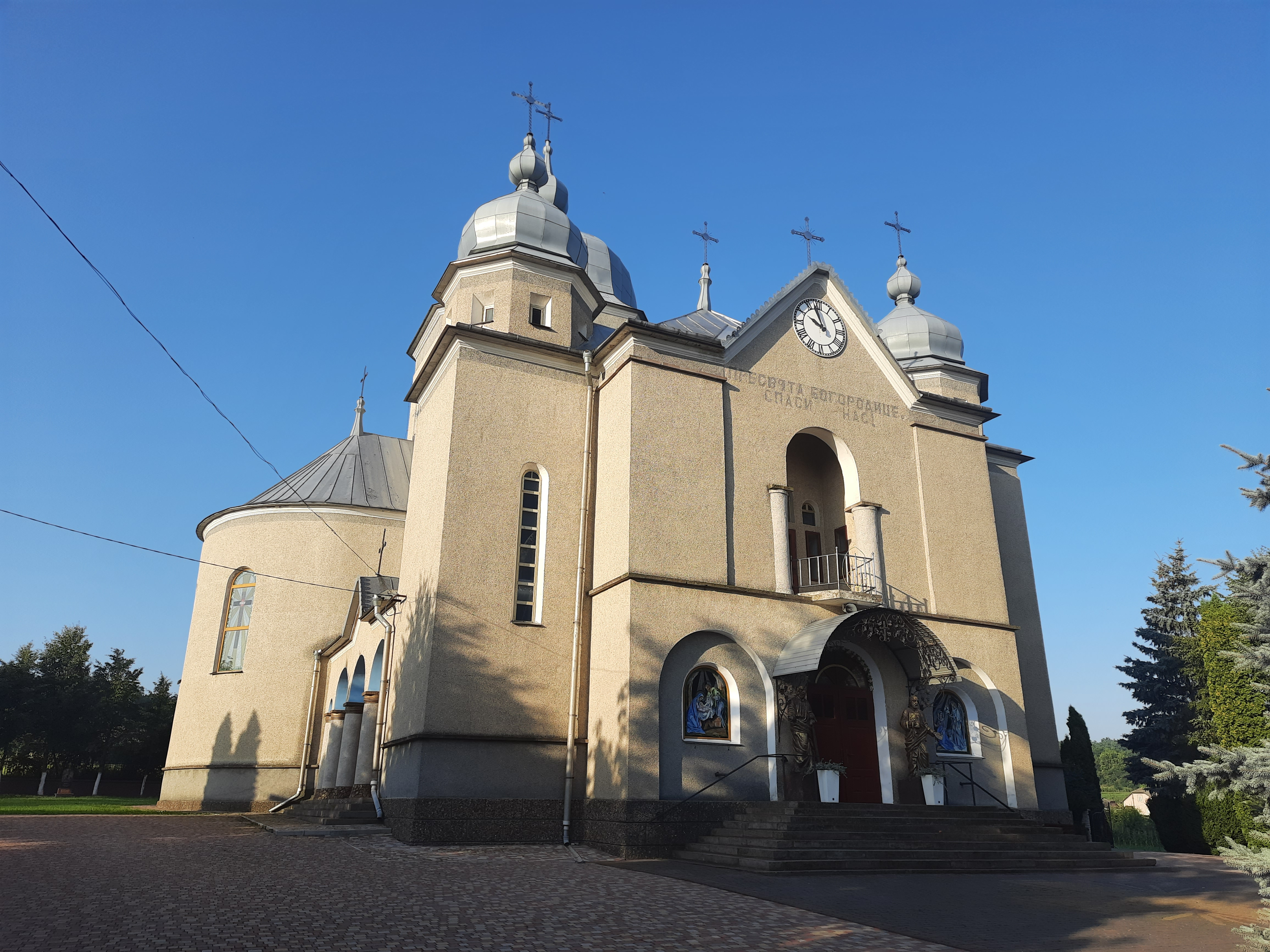
Church of the Intercession of the Most Holy Theotokos, Velyki village

Velyki Chornokintsi (Ukrainian: Великі Чорнокінці) is a village in Ukraine, Ternopil Oblast, Chortkiv Raion, Kolyndiany rural hromada.

== History ==
The first written mention is in 1564 as the property of Jan and Florian Piasecki; the village already had a church.

Since 29 July 2015, they have belonged to the Kolyndiany rural hromada.

== Religion ==
- Church of the Intercession (1996, designed by Lviv architect Ivan Levynskyi, UGCC)
- Church of the Virgin Mary (1878, destroyed in the 1940s, RCC)

== Notable residents ==
- Ivanna Synenka-Ivanytska (1897–1988), Ukrainian opera singer
