= Horodyski Palace =

Building in Ternopil Oblast, Ukraine

- Палац Городиських
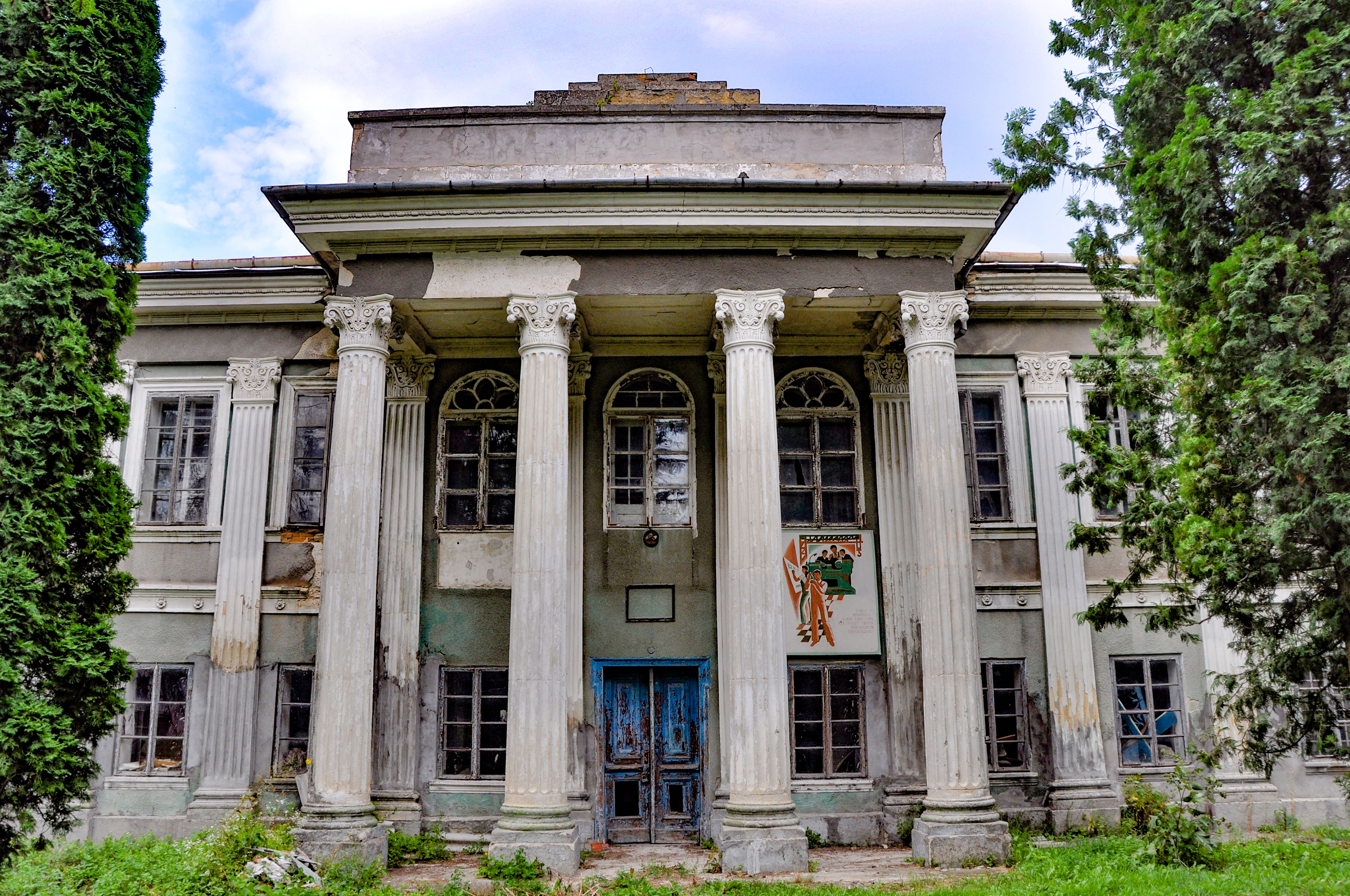
- Interactive map of the Horodyski Palace area

General information
- Location: Kolyndiany, Chortkiv Raion, Ternopil Oblast, Ukraine
- Coordinates: 48°57′45″N 25°57′14″E
- Opened: the castle was rebuilt in 1840 into a palace

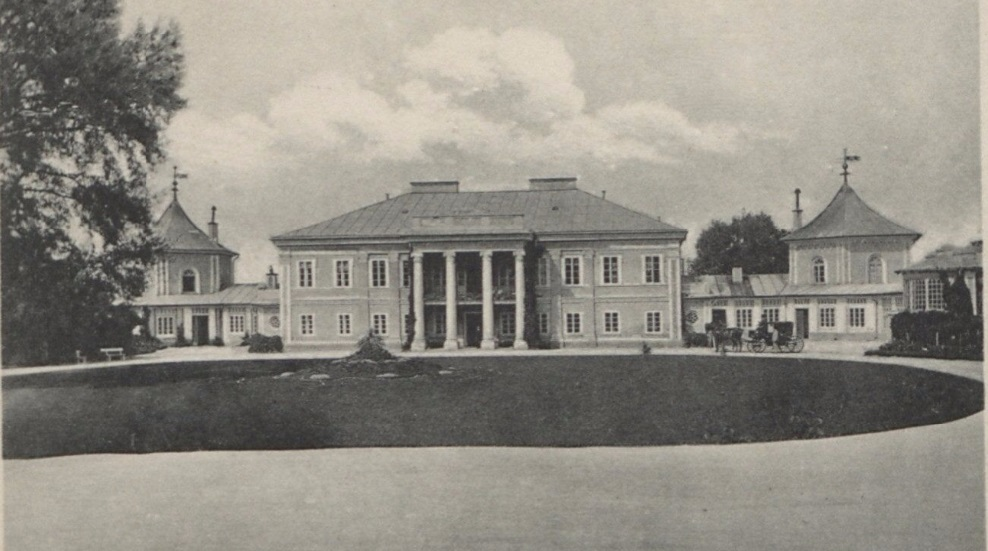
Horodyski Palace

Horodyski Palace (Ukrainian: Палац Городиських) is a historic building in Kolyndiany in the Chortkiv Raion of Ternopil Oblast, and an architectural monument of local importance.

== History ==
There was a castle in Kolydiany built by the Wołodyjowskis on the steep bank of the Nichlava river.

== Palace ==
The ruined castle was rebuilt around 1840 into a modern, late-classical, two-story palace by Kornel Horodyski, another owner originally from Volhynia, who converted the castle's two towers into pavilions. The palace during this period was decorated with grandeur both outside and inside. The rooms were decorated with paintings of the Dutch school, there was a large viewing terrace on the first floor, inside there were tiled stoves, fireplaces and chandeliers, and a palace garden at the back of the building. The building was damaged during World War I.

== See also ==
- Horodyski
