= Kolyndiany =

Kolyndiany Колиндяни
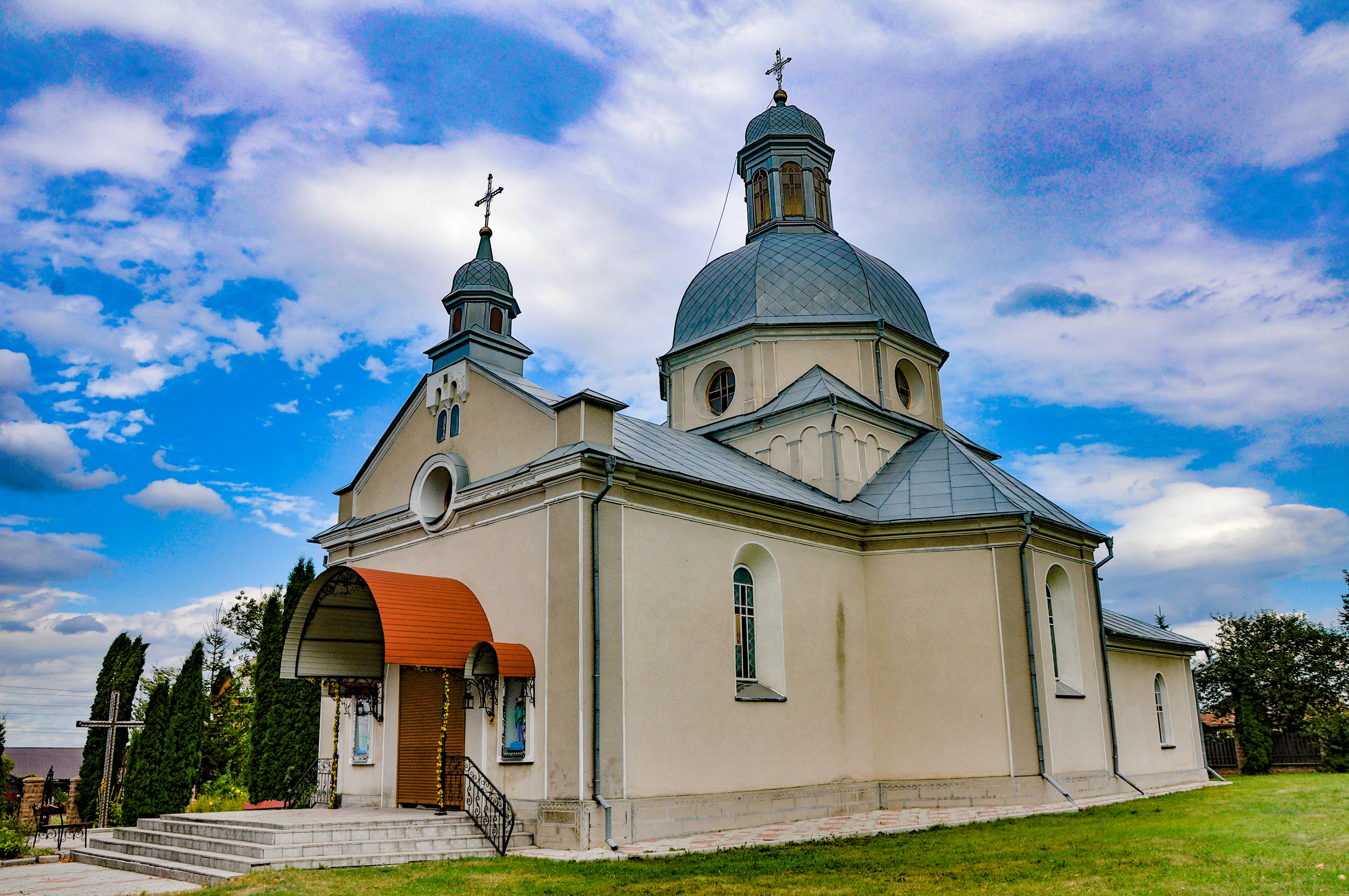
- Orthodox Church of St. Nicholas (1888)

- Flag Coat of arms

- Location in Ternopil Oblast
- Coordinates: 48°57′55″N 25°56′54″E
- Country: Ukraine
- Oblast: Ternopil Oblast
- Raion: Chortkiv Raion
- Hromada: Kolyndiany Hromada

Population (2018)
  - Total: 1,652
- Time zone: UTC+2 (EET)
  - Summer (DST): UTC+3 (EEST)
- Postal code: 48552

Kolyndiany (Ukrainian: Колиндяни, Polish: Kolędziany) is a village in Ukraine, Ternopil Oblast, Chortkiv Raion, Kolyndiany rural hromada.

== Geography ==
The village is located on the Nichlava river not far from Chortkiv.

== History ==
According to local retellings, forests located on the edge of the modern village once hosted a fortified city called Raihorod (Ukrainian: Райгород), which was destroyed by Tatars, leaving only remains of walls.

The first written mention of the village was in 1481.

In the XV century, the Stamenski nobles built a castle, which was rebuilt into a palace in 1840.

From 29 July 2015, it has been the center of the Kolyndiany rural hromada.

== Religion ==
- Saint Nicholas church (OCU, brick, 1889)
- Saint Nicholas church (UGCC, 2009)
- Church (RCC, early XX century)

=== Chapels ===
- one on the site of the house where Yosyf Yosafat Bilan lived and worked
- two chapels in honor of the Independence of Ukraine (1994, brick)

== People from Kolyndiany ==
- Yosyf Bilan, priest of the UGCC, a Basilian, and a long-term prisoner of communist camps
