= Church of the Dormition, Skala-Podilska =

Ukrainian Orthodox church in Skala-Podilska, Ukraine

Church of the Dormition Церква Успіння Пресвятої Богородиці
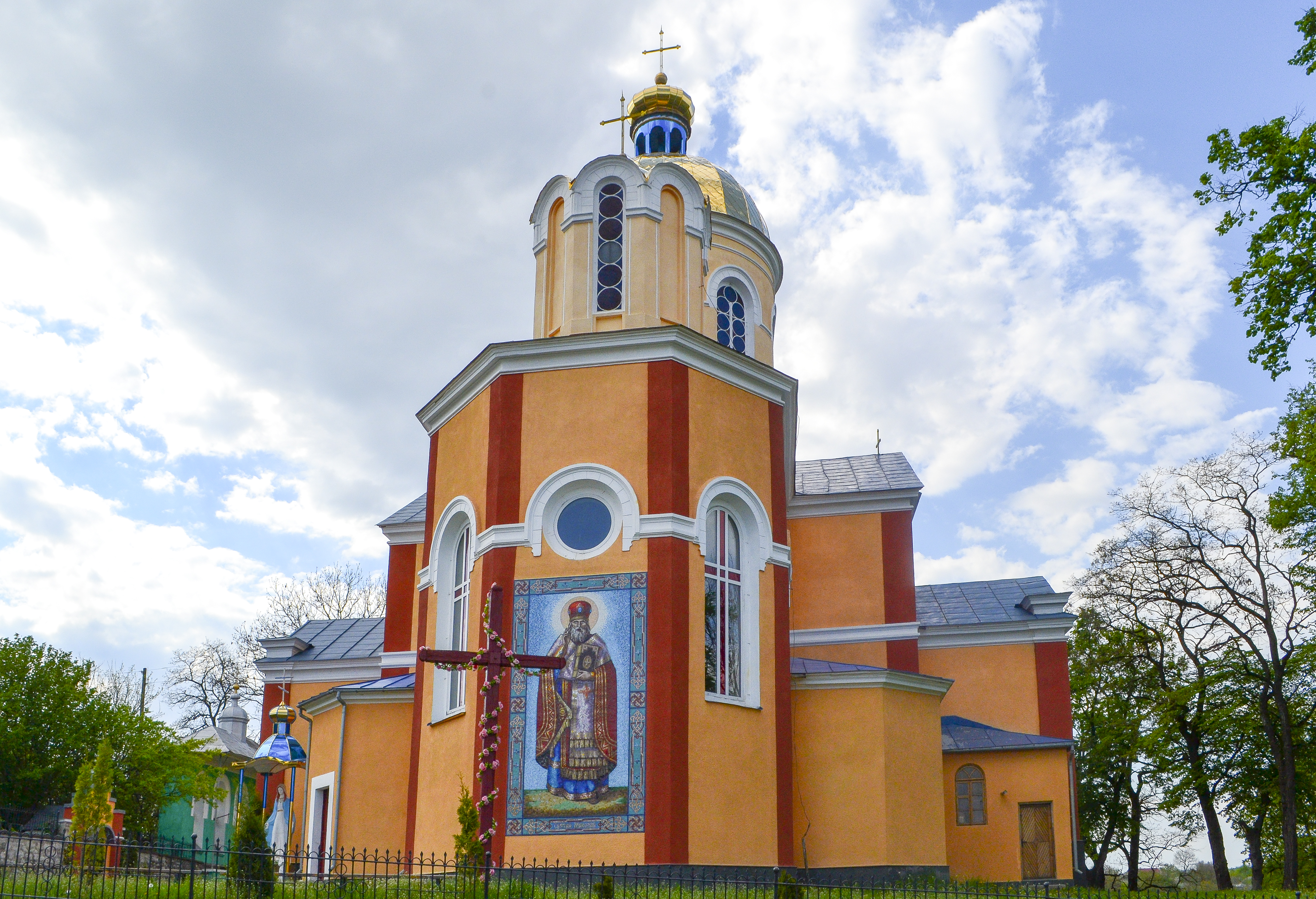

- Location within Ternopil Oblast

Religion
- Affiliation: Orthodox Church of Ukraine

Location
- Location: Skala-Podilska
- Coordinates: 48°51′18.8″N 26°11′59.4″E

Church of the Dormition (Ukrainian: Церква Успіння Пресвятої Богородиці) orthodox parish church (OCU) in Skala-Podilska of the Skala-Podilska Hromada of the Chortkiv Raion of the Ternopil Oblast. An architectural monument of local importance.

Mykhailo Hrushevskyi and Mariia-Ivanna from Voiakivskykh, the sister-in-law of the local priest, were married in the church.

== History ==
The first church was built in 1725. In 1877–1882, in view of the emergency condition of the Nicholas Church, at. Kelestyn Kostetskyi built a large stone church of the Dormition. The first stone was laid by Vasyl Martiuk, whose great-grandson was the church's elder brother and cashier from 1994 to 2009.

During the ministry of o. Oleksandr-Kostiantyn Levytskyi, the church was painted.

Before the First World War, St. Nicholas Church was granted three feasts: the Feast of the Transfer of the Relics of St. Nicholas and Mary Magdalene and the Feast of the Intercession of the Blessed Virgin Mary.

In 1946, the parish and the church were converted to Moscow Orthodoxy. In 1990, part of the village community returned to the bosom of the OCU.

== Priests ==
- at. Mykola Korostynskyi (until †1842)
- at. Omelian Koprovskyi (1842–1843, administrator; 1843–†1871, priest)
- at. Ivan Kushyk (1871–1872, administrator)
- at. Kelestyn Kostetskyi (1872–1885)
- at. Oleksandr Kysilevskyi (1885–1886, administrator)
- at. Oleksandr-Kostiantyn Levytskyi (1886–†1910)
- at. Kostiantyn Andrukhovych (1910–1912, administrator)
- at. Anatol Bazylevych (1912–1913, administrator)
- at. Vitold Bilynskyi (1913–†1919)
- at. Ivan Derevianko (1919–1959)
- at. Mykhailo Klym (1957–1987)
- at. Illia Nehir (since 1988)
