= Mykola Anastaziievskyi =

Ukrainian painter, art historian, educator, public figure (1891–1974)

- Микола Анастазієвський
- Born: 14 August 1891; Skala-nad-Zbruchem, Austria-Hungary (now Skala-Podilska, Ternopil Oblast, Ukraine)
- Died: 28 May 1974 (aged 82); Minneapolis
- Education: Kraków Academy of Arts, Institute of Fine and Applied Arts in Warsaw
- Occupations: Painter, art historian, educator, public figure

Mykola Anastaziievskyi (Ukrainian: Микола Анастазієвський; 14 August 1891 – 28 May 1974) was a Ukrainian painter, art historian, educator, public figure.

== Biography ==
He was born on 14 August 1891 in Skala-nad-Zbruchem (now Skala-Podilska in Chortkiv Raion, Ternopil Oblast, Ukraine) to a carpenter's family. In 1912, he graduated from the Real Gymnasium in Sniatyn, where, while studying, he created his first work of art for the theater club, entitled "Prayer"; in 1914, he graduated from the Kraków Academy of Arts, where his teachers were Józef Mehoffer, Stanisław Kamocki, and Ignacy Pieńkowski. He was a scholarship holder of Metropolitan Andrei Sheptytskyi.

During the liberation struggle, in 1918-1919, he worked as a painter and graphic artist at the Ministry of Education of the Ukrainian People's Republic in Kamianets-Podilskyi. Afterwards, he continued his art education at the Institute of Fine and Applied Arts in Warsaw, graduating in 1923.

In 1923-1927, he worked as a drawing teacher at a secondary school in Pomerania; later, until 1939, at other schools in Poland; in 1940-1944, at Ukrainian gymnasiums and lyceums in Chełm. He took an active part in the artistic life of Western Ukraine.

During the war, he went to Germany, where he was a professor at the Higher School of Fine Arts in Karlsfeld, later in Berchtesgaden, which was founded by Serhii Lytvynenko. In 1950, he moved to the United States of America, where he settled in Minneapolis (Minnesota) and continued his creative work.

He died in Minneapolis on 28 May 1974, where he is buried.

== Creativity ==
The artist's work is dominated by everyday scenes, still lifes, Christmas and Easter postcards; he also worked in the field of advertising. Among his works:

- Автопортрет (1915);
- Кам'янець-Подільський. Твердиня (1919);
- Портрет Андрія Яковича Чайковського, письменника, адвоката (1929; National Museum of Hutsulshchyna and Pokuttia Folk Art);
- Христос на руїнах Нюрнберга й Києва (1944, watercolor composition);
- Портрет Катрі Гриневич (1947);
- По ялинку (1967).

During his stay in the camps for displaced persons, he created compositions, portraits, alpine landscapes, and greeting and holiday cards with oil paints.

=== Exhibition activities ===
Participated in exhibitions in Lviv of the Circle of Ukrainian Art Workers in 1923 and 1926, the third exhibition of the UTMP in 1934, and a retrospective exhibition of Ukrainian art in 1935 (with paintings "Girl", "Schoolboy", "Memory"); in Kraków, Augsburg, Berchtesgaden, Munich in 1947.

In the United States, he participated in exhibitions in Minneapolis, São Paulo, Detroit, and New York City, among others:

- At the first art exhibition of Ukrainian artists on 15–25 March 1952, he exhibited his works "Flowers", "Boz in front of the house", "Mountain in the Alps";
- He participated in the "Exhibition of Participants of the 1st Meeting of Ukrainian Artists of America and Canada in Toronto" in 1954;
- He exhibited his work "Human Loyalty" in 1960 at the sixth "Exhibition of Ukrainian Artists in the Free World" and "Exhibition of Ukrainian Art" at Wayne State University in Detroit;
- In 1961-1962, he participated in the ninth "Exhibition of Ukrainian Artists" with his works: "Tree in the Sun" and "Willows";
- In 1963, at the Tenth Exhibition of Ukrainian Artists, he exhibited his works "On the Ruins" (watercolor), "Stairs" (watercolor), "Sunflowers" (oil).

He participated in other exhibitions of the Ukrainian Artist's Association in USA.

== Bibliography ==
- Анастазієвський Микола // Енциклопедія українознавства : Словникова частина : [в 11 т.] / Наукове товариство імені Шевченка ; гол. ред. проф., д-р Володимир Кубійович. — Париж — Нью-Йорк : Молоде життя, 1955. — Кн. 2, [т. 1] : А — Головна Руська Рада. — С. 43. — ISBN 5-7707-4049-3.;
- Anastaziievskyi Mykola / B. P. Pevnyi // Encyclopedia of Modern Ukraine [Online] / Eds. : I. М. Dziuba, A. I. Zhukovsky, M. H. Zhelezniak [et al.] ; National Academy of Sciences of Ukraine, Shevchenko Scientific Society. – Kyiv : The NASU institute of Encyclopedic Research, 2001.
- (in Ukrainian) Дуда І., Певний Б., Анастазієвський Микола // Ternopil Encyclopedic Dictionary: in 4 v. / editorial board: H. Yavorskyi and other, Ternopil: "Zbruch", 2004, V. 1: А—Й, S. 36. — ISBN 966-528-197-6.;
- І. С. Анастазієвський Микола // Енциклопедія української діяспори / Василь Маркусь, головний редактор; Дарія Маркусь, співредактор. — Наукове товариство ім. Шевченка в Америці. — Нью-Йорк—Чикаго, 2009. — Т. 1 Сполучені Штати Америки. Книга 1 А—К. — С. 13. — ISBN 0-88054-145-8.;
- Г. Г. Стельмащук. Анастазієвський Микола // Українські митці у світі. Матеріали до історії українського мистецтва XX ст.. — Львівська національна академія мистецтв (Науково-дослідний сектор). — Львів : Апріорі, 2013. — С. 35—36. — ISBN 978-617-629-152-7.;
- Анастазієвський, Микола // Велика українська енциклопедія : [у 30 т.] / проф. А. М. Киридон (відп. ред.) та ін. — К. : ДНУ «Енциклопедичне видавництво», 2018—2025. — ISBN 978-617-7238-39-2.
- L. Voloshyn (2024). "Анастазієвський Микола". Мистецька школа Олекси Новаківського 1923-1935. Життя у перспективі часу (in Ukrainian). Lviv–Drohobych: Kolo. p. 254—255, 326—327. ISBN 978-617-642-676-9.
