= Kolyndiany rural hromada =

Rural hromada in Ternopil Oblast, Ukraine

Kolyndiany rural hromada Колиндянська сільська громада
- hromada
- Seal

- Location within Ternopil Oblast Location within Ukraine
- Coordinates: 48°57′55″N 25°56′54″E
- Country: Ukraine
- Oblast: Ternopil Oblast
- Raion: Chortkiv Raion
- Administrative center: Kolyndiany

Government
  - Hromada head: Roman Klapkiv

Area
  - Total: 156.7 km^{2} (60.5 sq mi)

Population (2022)
  - Total: 6,488
- Villages: 8
- Website: kld-gromada.gov.ua

Kolyndiany rural territorial hromada (Ukrainian: Колиндянська територіальна громада, romanized: Kolyndianska silska terytorialna hromada) is a hromada in Ukraine, in Chortkiv Raion of Ternopil Oblast. The administrative center is the village of Kolyndiany. Its population is 6,488 (2022 estimate)

== History ==
It was formed on 29 July 2015 by merging Kolyndiany, Velyki Chornokintsi, Davydkivtsi, Mali Chornokintsi, Tarnavka, Chornokinetska Volia Village Councils of Chortkiv Raion.

On 10 December 2020, Probizhna and Tovstenke village councils of Chortkiv Raion joined the hromada.

== Settlements ==
The hromada consists of 8 villages:

- Chornokinetska Volia
- Davydkivtsi
- Kolyndiany
- Mali Chornokintsi
- Probizhna
- Tarnavka
- Tovstenke
- Velyki Chornokintsi
