= Horodyski =

Polish noble family

- Horodyski family coat of arms
- Current region: Poland
- Origin: Second Republic of Poland; Kingdom of Poland

The Horodyski family – a Polish noble family of the Korczak coat of arms, who according to a historian Adam Boniecki had come up with three independent seats, i.e. with Horodyszcze in the province of Volhynia, with Horodyszcze in the Land of Chełm and Horodyszcze in the district Sambir in the Land of Przemyśl, now modern-day Ukraine.

It is possible that the original seat of the family, however, was Horodyszcze in the Land of Chełm, the Horodyski family was recorded there specifically in the acts of municipal and landowners beginning in the fifteenth century.

Today, members of the House of Staniewski are historic heirs of the Sambir estate of the Horodyski family.

== See also ==
- Zamoyski family
- Starykoń coat of arms
- Ostoja coat of arms
- Horodyski Palace

== Bibliography ==
- Adam Boniecki Herbarz polski, T. 1, Warszawa, 1899 (translated)
- Poczet szlachty galicyjskiej i bukowińskiej, Lwów, 1857, reprint: Krajowa Agencja Wydawnicza, Kraków, 1988 (translated)
