= Skala-Podilska =

Rural locality in Ternopil Oblast, Ukraine

Skala-Podilska Skala
- Rural settlement
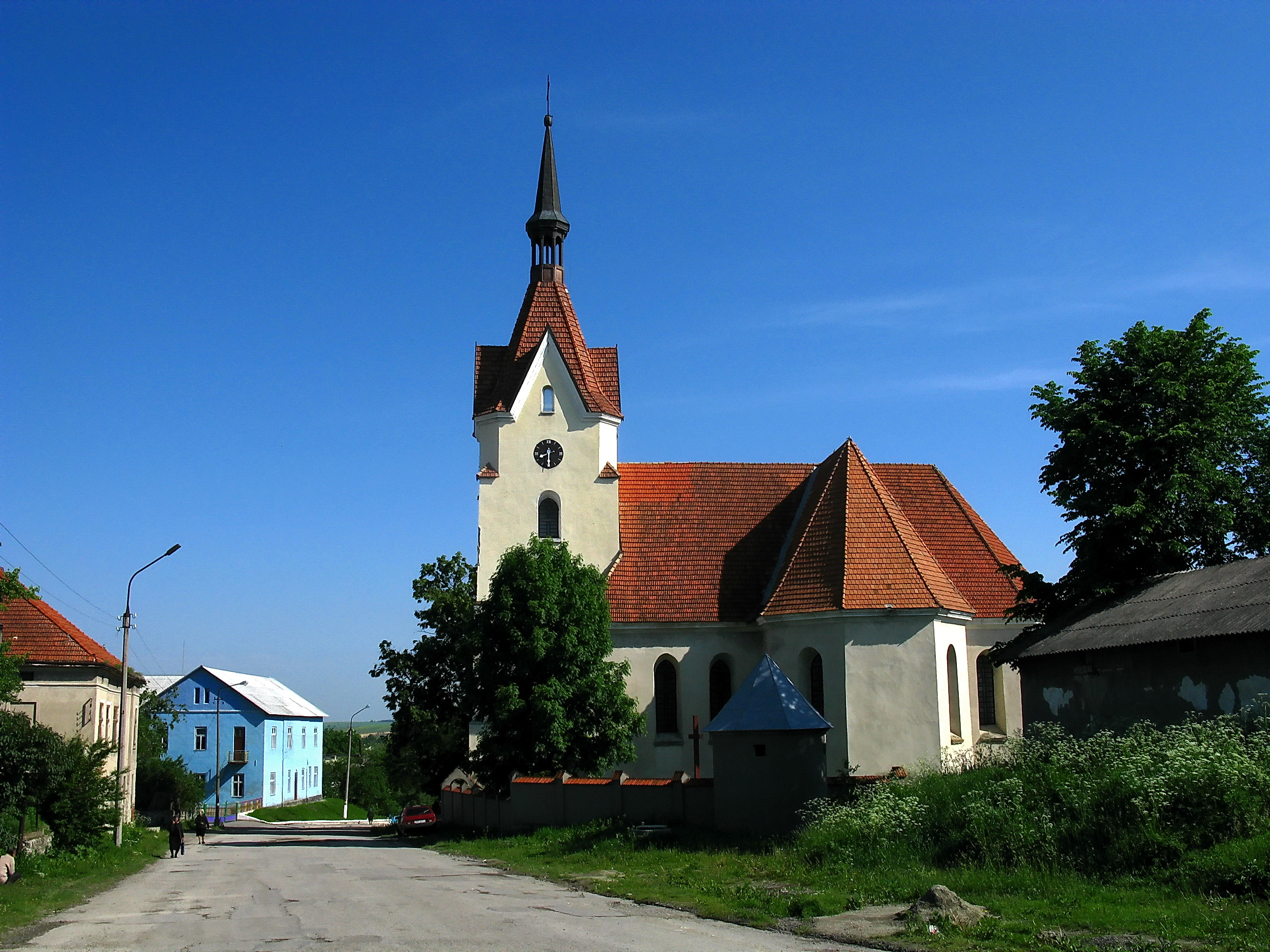
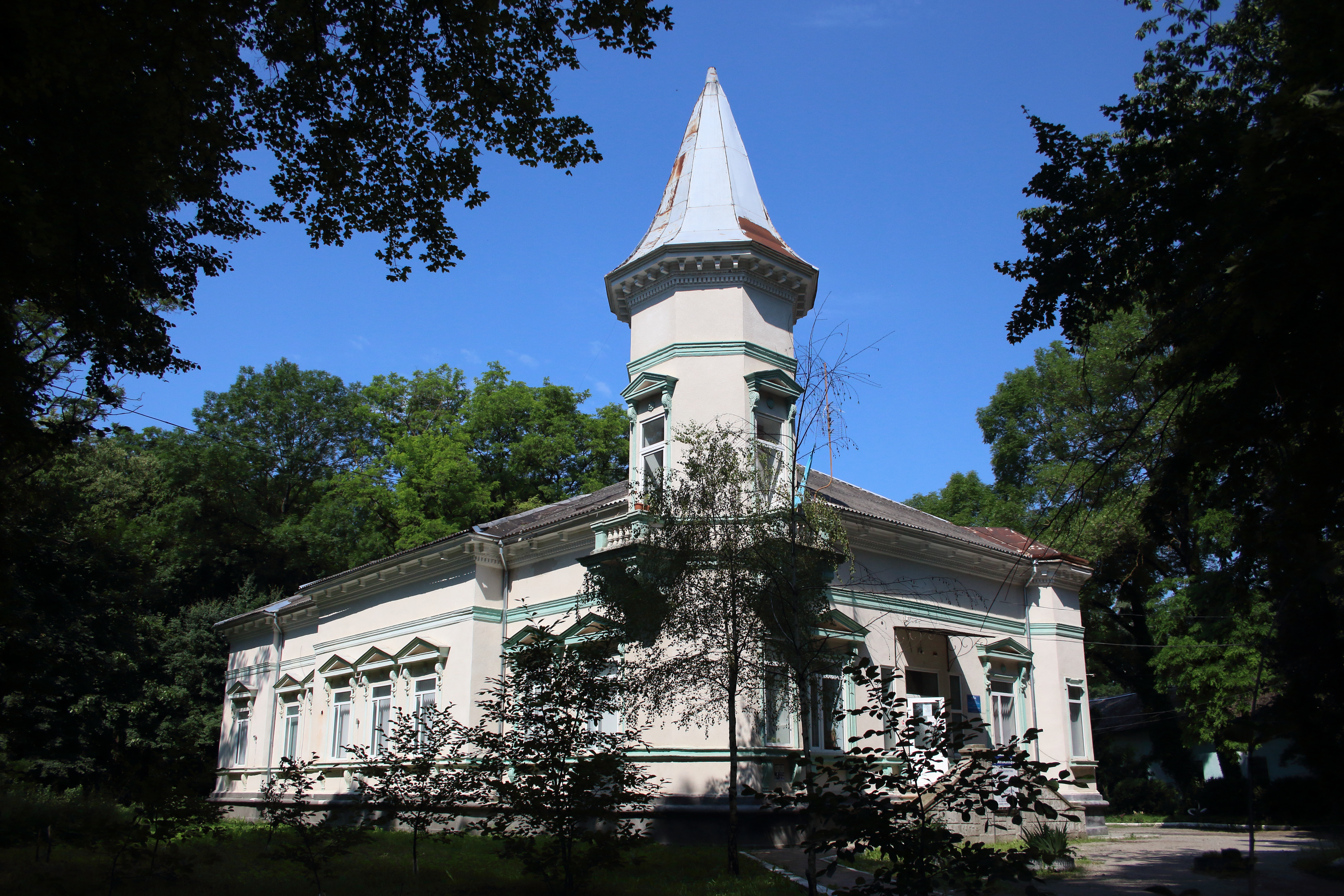
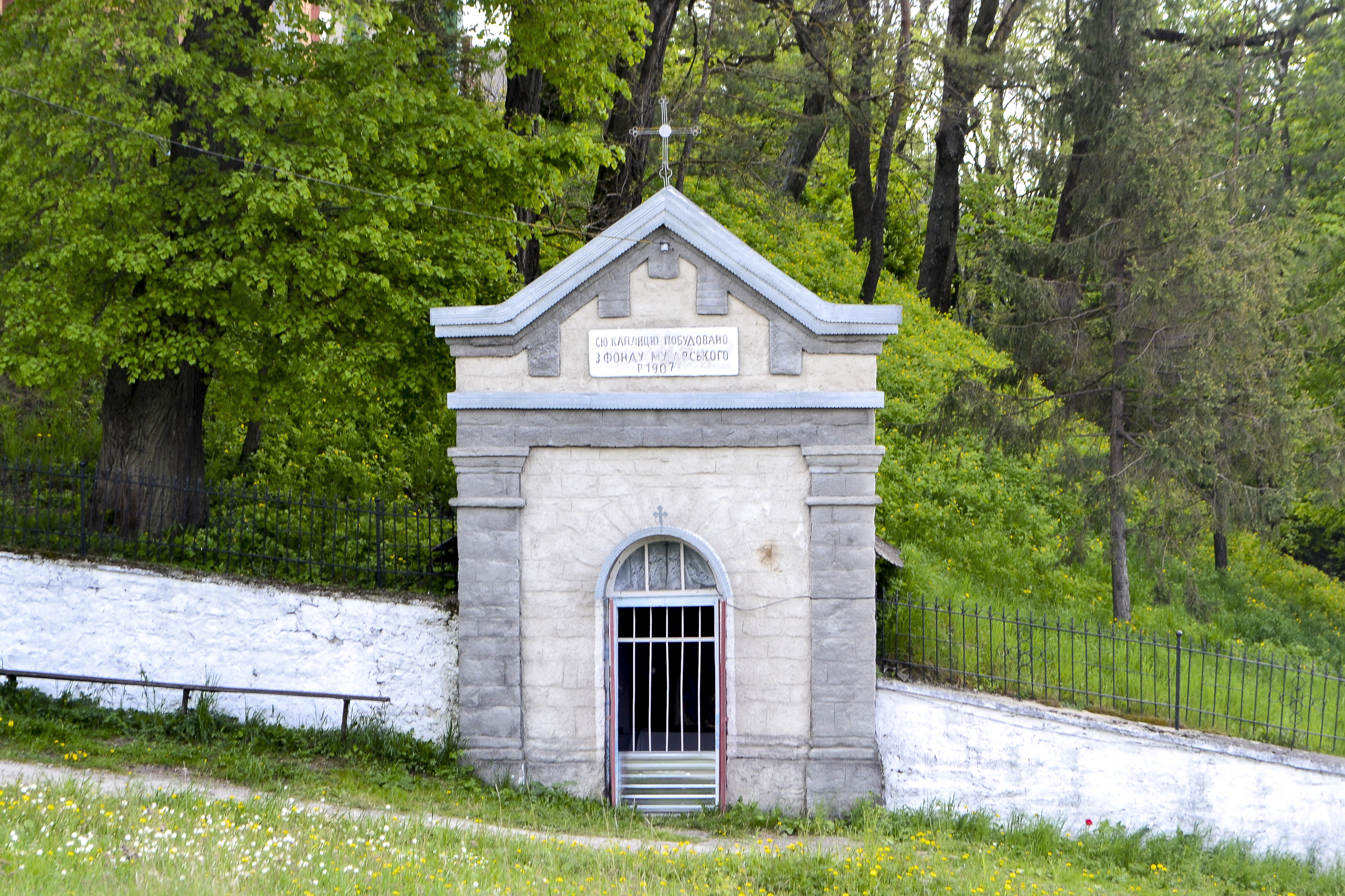
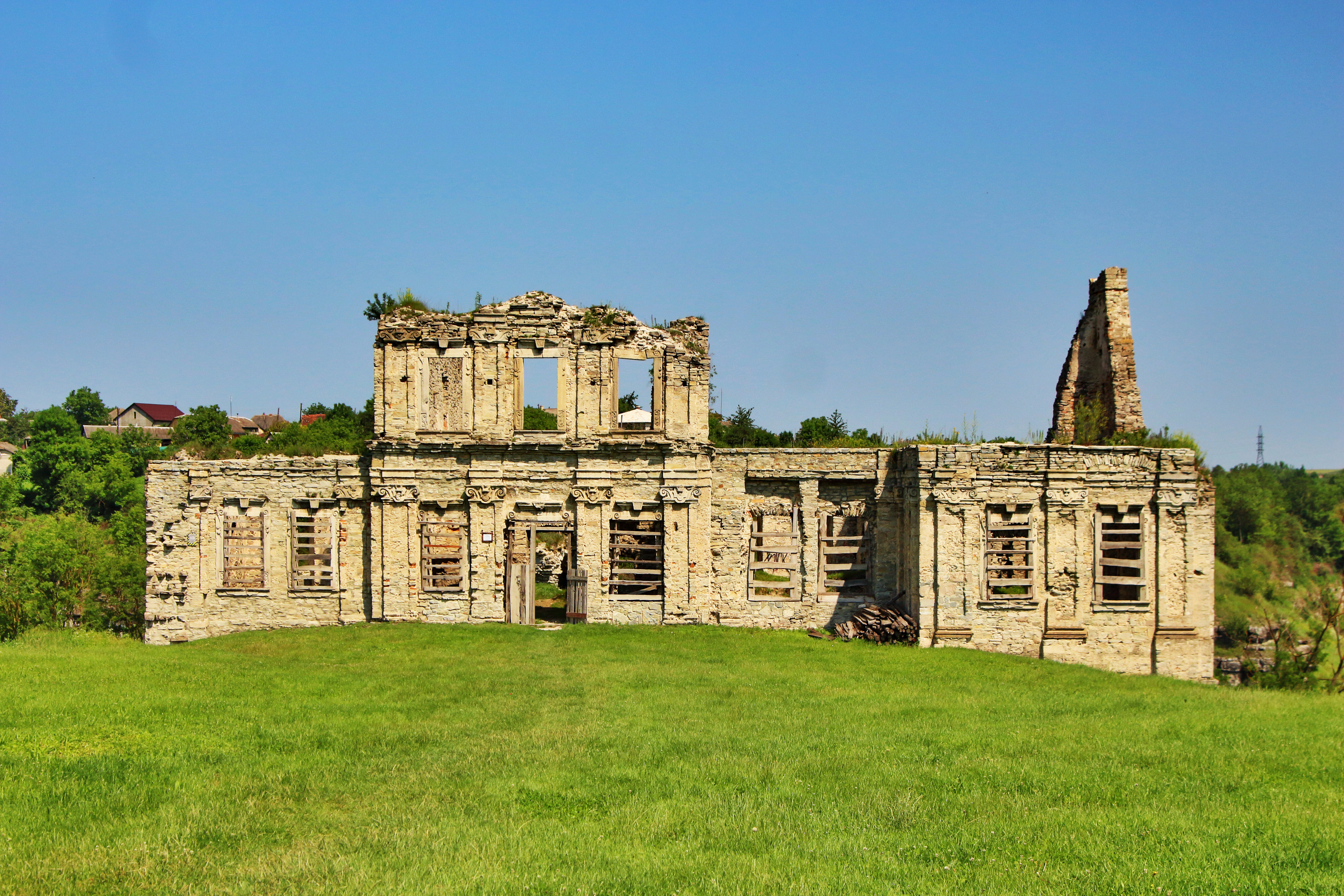
- Clockwise from top: Church of the Assumption; chapel; ruins of the castle; surviving palace wing, now a hospital

- Seal

- Location in Ukraine Skala-Podilska (Ukraine)
- Coordinates: 48°51′9″N 26°11′40″E
- Country: Ukraine
- Oblast: Ternopil Oblast
- Raion: Chortkiv Raion

Government
  - Mayor: Victor P. Myronchuk

Area
  - Total: 1.52 km^{2} (0.59 sq mi)

Population (2022)
  - Total: 4,094
  - Estimate (2024): 3,660
- Time zone: UTC+2 (EET)
  - Summer (DST): UTC+3 (EEST)

Skala-Podilska (Ukrainian: Скала-Подільська, romanized: Skala-Podilʹsʹka; Polish: Skała Podolska; Yiddish: סקאַלע, romanized: Skala; Hebrew: סקאלה, romanized: Skala) or Skala upon Zbruch (Ukrainian: Скала-над-Збручем, romanized: Skala-nad-Zbruchem; Polish: Skała nad Zbruczem; German: Skala am Sbrutsch) is a rural settlement in Chortkiv Raion, Ternopil Oblast, Ukraine over the Zbruch River. It hosts the administration of Skala-Podilska settlement hromada, one of the hromadas of Ukraine. Population: 4,094 (2022 estimate).

It was, at one time, named simply "Skala", however the town compounded its name, variously, to "Skala upon Zbruch", in order to distinguish itself from another town with that same name.

== Geography and geology ==
The town is located 108 km away from the regional center and 37 km from the district center. Geographically Skala is located in western Podolia, not far from the confluence of Zbruch and Dniester. Skala's historical core is surrounded on three sides by rocks steeply falling towards the river, and the settlement's name is derived from that feature (Polish: skała - "rock"). Unlike the surrounding area, where limestone deposits belong to a thick ridge (a barrier reef of the Neogene period), the rock formations of Skala belong to the Silurian period and have been protected by the state as a monument of local geology since 1996.

Because of its border location, Skala had a history of ethnic diversity and was particularly susceptible to turmoil during periods of war or political unrest.

== History ==
=== Medieval and Early Modern period ===
The town is first mentioned in the 13th century, but according to Polish historians a fortified area (dytynets) stood on its location already during the Rus' era in the 11th century. According to a local legend, Daniel of Galicia wintered in Skala during his journey to the khan's headquarters. After its destruction by Tatars in the 14th century, a new fortress was built in 1360s - 1370s. After the Kingdom of Galicia-Volhynia had been torn apart between the Kingdom of Poland and the Grand Duchy of Lithuania, the city was secured by the Lithuanian family of Koriatovychi, but its ruler Theodor later lost his possessions in the region to Grand Duke Vytautas. After Vytautas' death the city passed to the Polish Crown, and in 1518 was granted Magdeburg Law.

One of the city's owners under the Polish rule was Stanisław Lanckoronski, starost of Kamianets, who rebuilt Skala and its castle after another Tatar raid. Local burghers were freed for taxation for a period of two years, during which new stone fortifications with bastions were constructed. On the southern side of the town a deep moat was constructed parallel to the walls along with a powder tower, which is still partially preserved to this time. A chain-fastened drawbridge was built across the moat in order to provide access to the city gates, and the structure's depictions are present on the contemporary seals issued by the city's authorities.

During the 16-17th centuries Skala was subjected to numerous raids by Tatars and Turks, as well as attacks by rebellious peasants and Cossacks, which brought great damage the city and its fortifications. Cossack attacks caused an especially great destruction for Skala's Jewish population. After being transferred under the ownership of Transylvanian prince George II Rákóczi, the local castle declined further. After being captured by the Ottomans in 1672, the fortress was abandoned and replaced with a mosque. Until 1699 Skala served as a nahiya centre in Kamaniçe sanjak of Podolia Eyalet and was known as İskala.

After the return under Polish rule, during the 18th century Skala was populated predominantly by Jews. Its starost Adam Tarło contributed to the restoration of the fortifications. A Late Baroque palace was constructed, but soon thereafter destroyed by a fire, but large cellars of the structure still remain intact, attracting numerous treasure hunters. Another structure built during that period is the 1719 Assumption Church. After the First partition of Poland in the late 18th century, Skala became part of the Habsburg monarchy except brief Russian rule between 1809 and 1815. In 1809 a post office was opened in the town.

=== Modern period ===
Prior to World War I, Skala was part of the province of Galicia, on the eastern border of the Austro-Hungarian Empire. During the late 18th century, the town had been purchased by the noble Gołuchowski family, serving as their estate. Around 1875 the family's residence was constructed, surrounded by a landscape park with the area of 50 hectares. The residence, along with its library and a Neo-Gothic chapel, was destroyed during the First World War. Its reconstruction was planned to commence in September 1939, but its architect fell victim to the German invasion of Poland.

In 1907 Skala suffered a devastating fire, with restoration works continuing for many years afterwards. In 1919 — after World War I, the collapse of the Austro-Hungarian Empire, and the Polish-Ukrainian War — Skala upon Zbruch became part of eastern Poland. It was populated mostly by Ukrainians, Poles, and Jews. The town bordered the Soviet Union, from which it was separated only by the Zbrucz River. During the 1920s a new synagogue in Skala was erected, also functioning as a Jewish community centre. The local Poles operated their own "Polish house". During that period the town housed an army barracks and a border guards school, and was a major centre of gardening, fishing and maize cultivation. Local plums were an especially popular delicacy. Along with surrounding areas, Skala became known as a health resort thanks to its southerly location in comparison to other Polish-ruled areas.

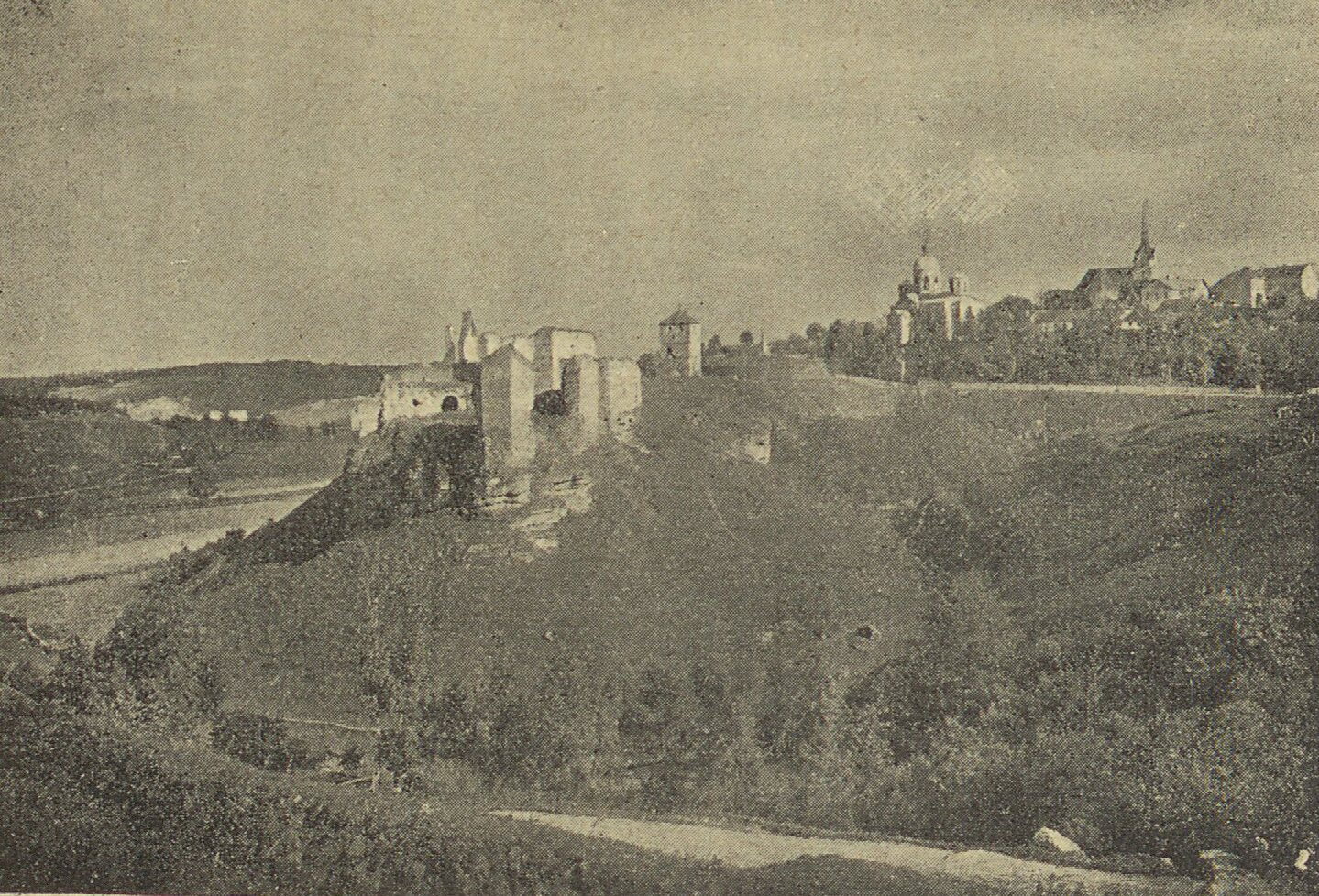
General view before 1936

In 1939—toward the beginning of World War II—the Soviet Union invaded Skala upon Zbruch and forcibly "resettled" many of the Ukrainians, Poles, and Jews to remote areas of the Soviet Union. Due both to the forcible nature of these "resettlements" and to the severe conditions of the resettlement regions, these locales have sometimes been characterized as "being arrested and sent to the gulag" (see Gulag#During World War II"). Under Soviet rule the town was renamed Skala-Podilska ("Skala in Podillia"). In the summer-autumn of 1941, the territories annexed by the Soviet Union were overrun by Nazi Germany in the course of the initially successful German attack on the USSR. Most of the Jews from Skala upon Zbruch perished during the Holocaust in Borshchiv Ghetto . Under Nazi occupation, the castle area was repurposed as a forced labour camp.

After the defeat of Nazi Germany, Skala-Podilska officially became part of the Soviet Union as a result of the territorial changes of Poland after World War II. It belonged to Borshchiv Raion of Ternopil region of the Ukrainian SSR. As a result of the war, the town had lost most of its inhabitants. A quarry located near the town became a mass grave for Ukrainian Insurgent Army partisans executed by Soviet authorities. By 1966 Skala-Podilska had a population of 4,500. An asphalt factory and several food industry enterprises were active in the settlement. During the 1970s the ruins of the palace were dismantled, and a tourist base was established on the site. The landscape park, one of the best in Ukraine, survives along with several minor structures and the Gołuchowski family crypt, which during the Soviet era served as a petrol station.

Since August 24, 1991 it has belonged to independent Ukraine. Until 18 July 2020, Skala-Podilska belonged to Borshchiv Raion. The raion was abolished in July 2020 as part of the administrative reform of Ukraine, which reduced the number of raions of Ternopil Oblast to three. The area of Borshchiv Raion was merged into Chortkiv Raion. Until 26 January 2024, Skala-Podilska was designated urban-type settlement. On that day, a new law entered into force which abolished this status, and Skala-Podilska became a rural settlement.

== Monuments ==
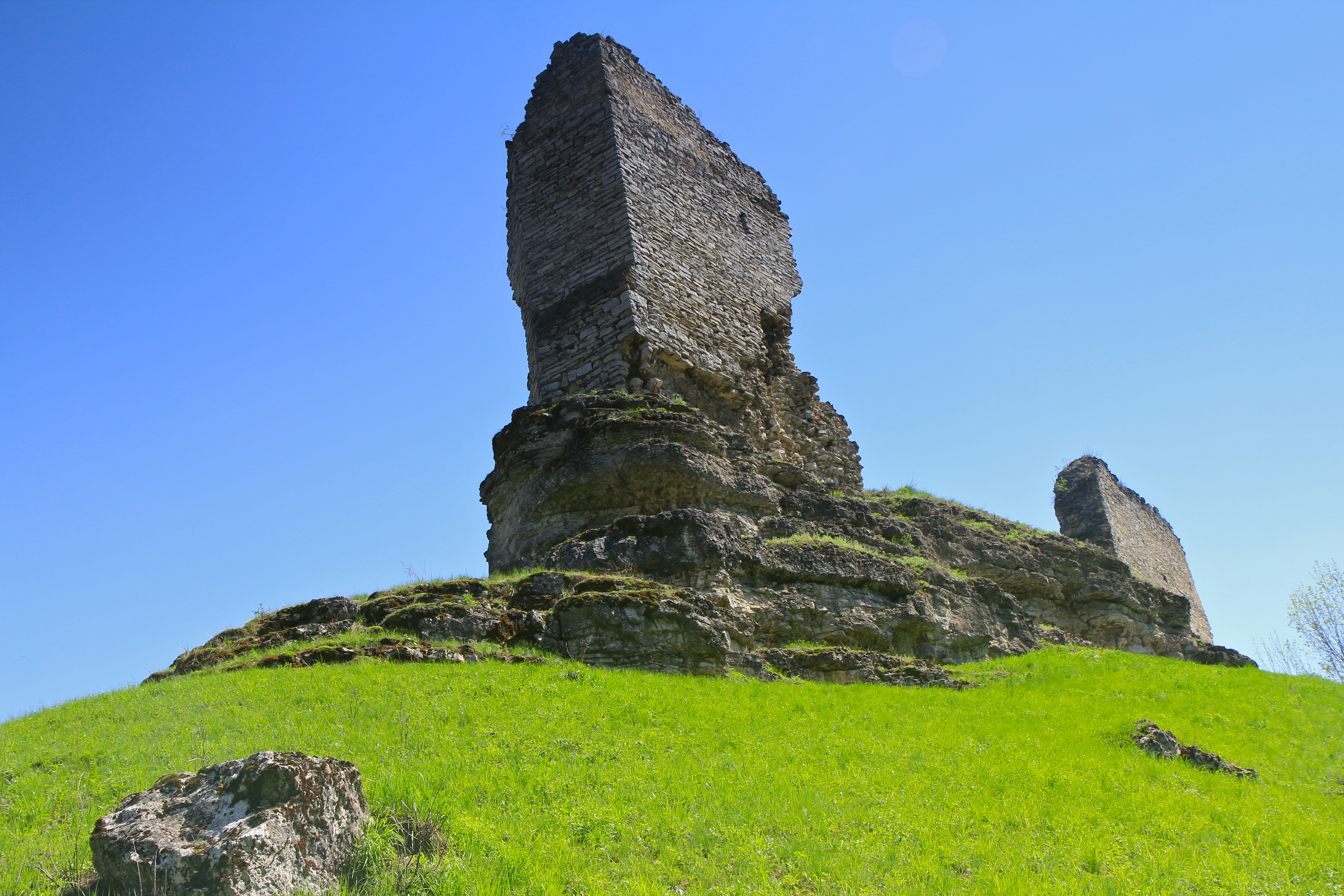
Ruins of the castle fortifications

=== Nature ===
Geological monument of the nature of local significance — "Dislocation of Silurian in Skala-Podilska".

The botanical monument of the nature of local significance — "age oaks".

Skala-Podilska borders on the Podilski Tovtry National Nature Park.

=== Architecture, Memorial Tables ===
- Skala-Podilska Castle - defensive building, monument of national importance architecture. Preserved ruins of powder tower, defensive walls and palace.
- Skala-Podilska Park - a monument of garden art of national importance.
- Church of the Dormition (built in 1882 instead of the same name of the wooden temple of 1720-1728; Marriage Mykhailo Hrushevsky and Maria-Ivanna from Voyakovsky, their local pastor.
- Roman Catholic Church of Heaven of the Blessed Virgin Mary (1719, mold)
- People's Home (1885), for a long time requires repair
- Church of the Suppression of the Blessed Virgin Mary (since 2013 builds)
- Chapel-Tomb of Goluhovsky, semi-destroyed
- Chapel, figure of Jesus Christ (2002)

The monuments of Khmelnitsky (1954), common grave of Red Army soldiers (1957), in honor of the victory in the World War II (1988), victims of Stalinist Repressions (1996), a symbolic grave of the Ukrainian Sich Riflemen (1990).

- Memorial Crosses in honor of Ukraine's independence (1992), cancellation of the Board (Restor. 1999)
- Mykhailo Hrushevsky Monument in Central Square (2010)
- Memorial tables in honor of Mykhailo Baran (1987), B. Pavlyuk, M. Skala-Starytsky (1995), on the building of NKVD prison (14.10.2015)
- On December 26, 2014, a solemn opening and dedication of the priests of the Memorial constructed in memory of dead heroes - participants of the Revolution of Dignity and fighting in the east of Ukraine - the priest of the UOC KP (Fr. Ilya Nejah), the RCC - (Fr. Volodymyr Strogush) and UGCC - (Fr. Vasyl Germanyuk).

== Notable residents ==
- Mykola Anastaziievskyi (1891–1974), Ukrainian painter, art historian, educator, public figure.
- Agenor Romuald Gołuchowski (1812-1875), Austrian politician.
- Fradl Shtok (1888-1990), Yiddish poet and short story writer.
- Zvi Zimmerman (1913-2006), Zionist activist, jurist, and Israeli politician.

== International relations ==
Skala-Podilska is twinned with

- (Poland) Sędziszów

== Gallery ==
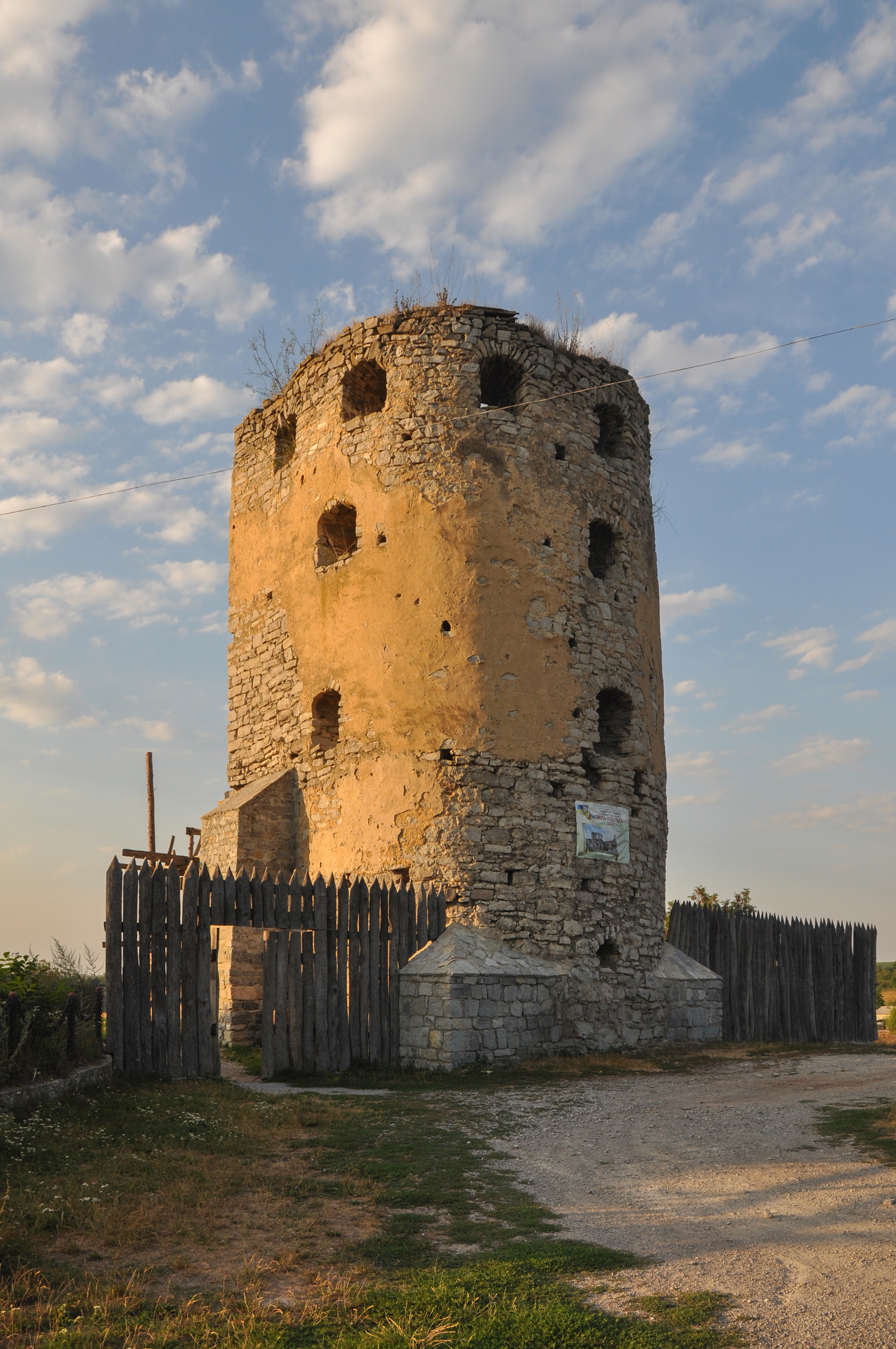
Ruins of the powder tower

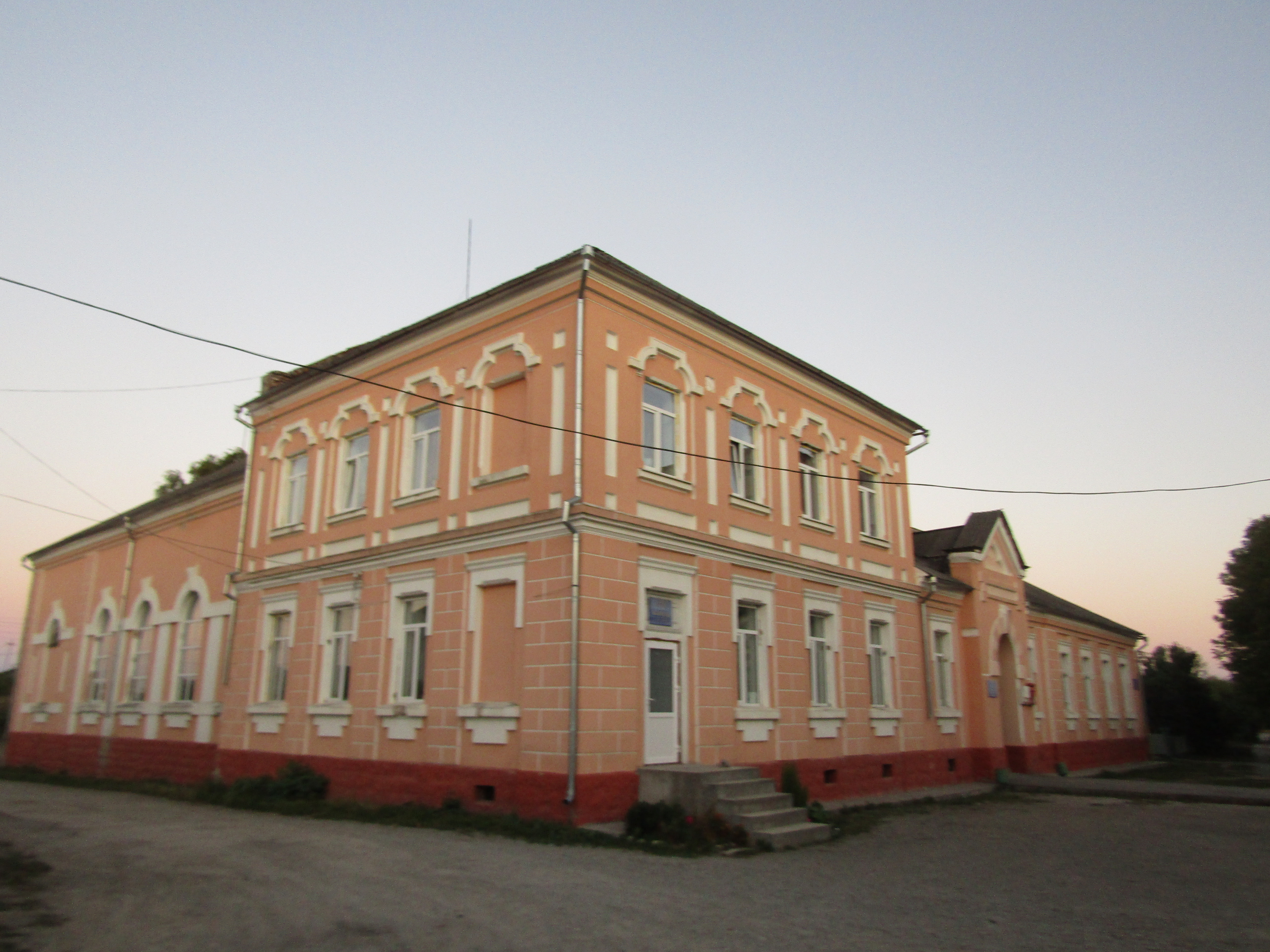
Polish People's House

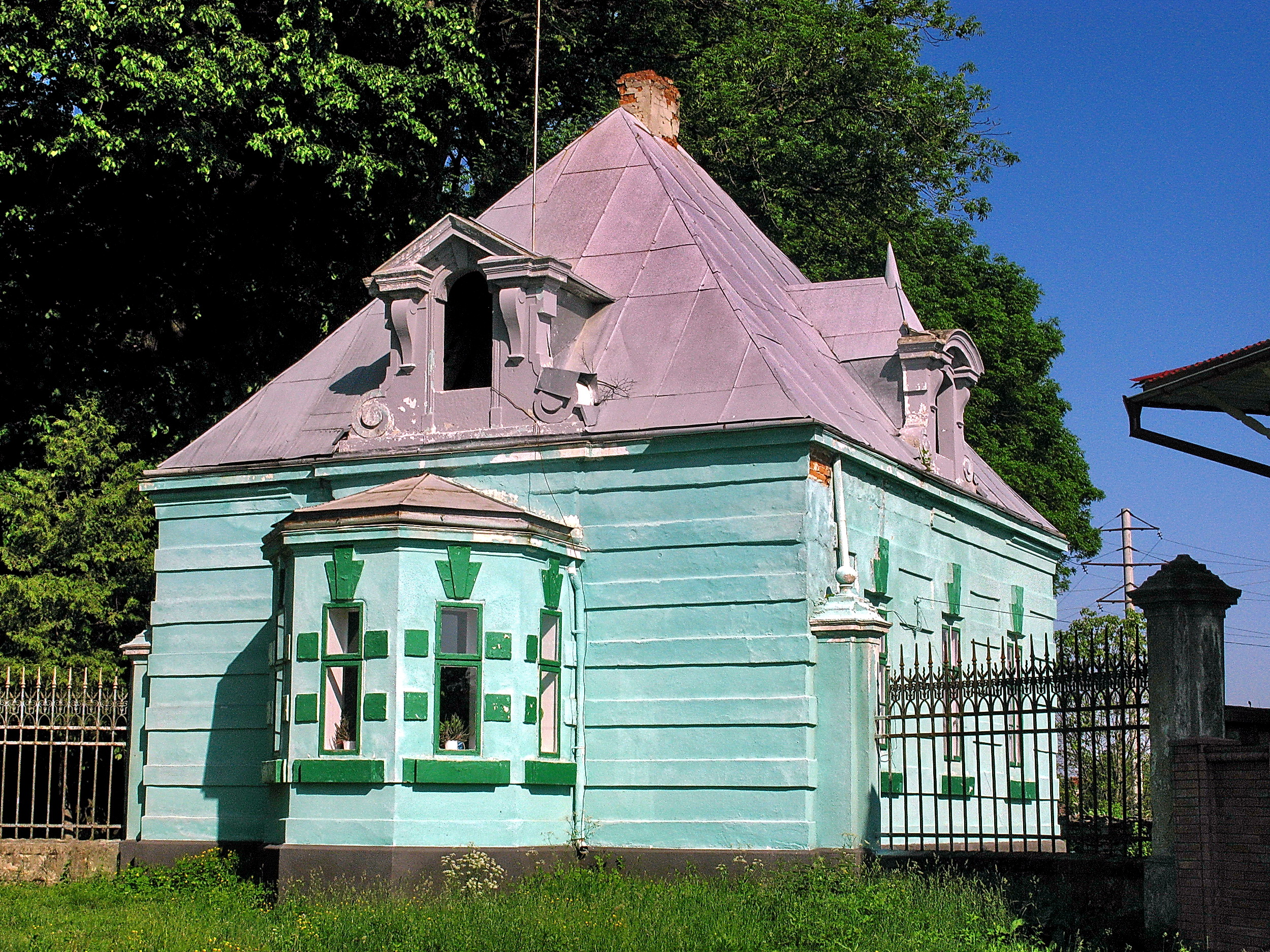
Entry pavilion of the Gołuchowski Palace

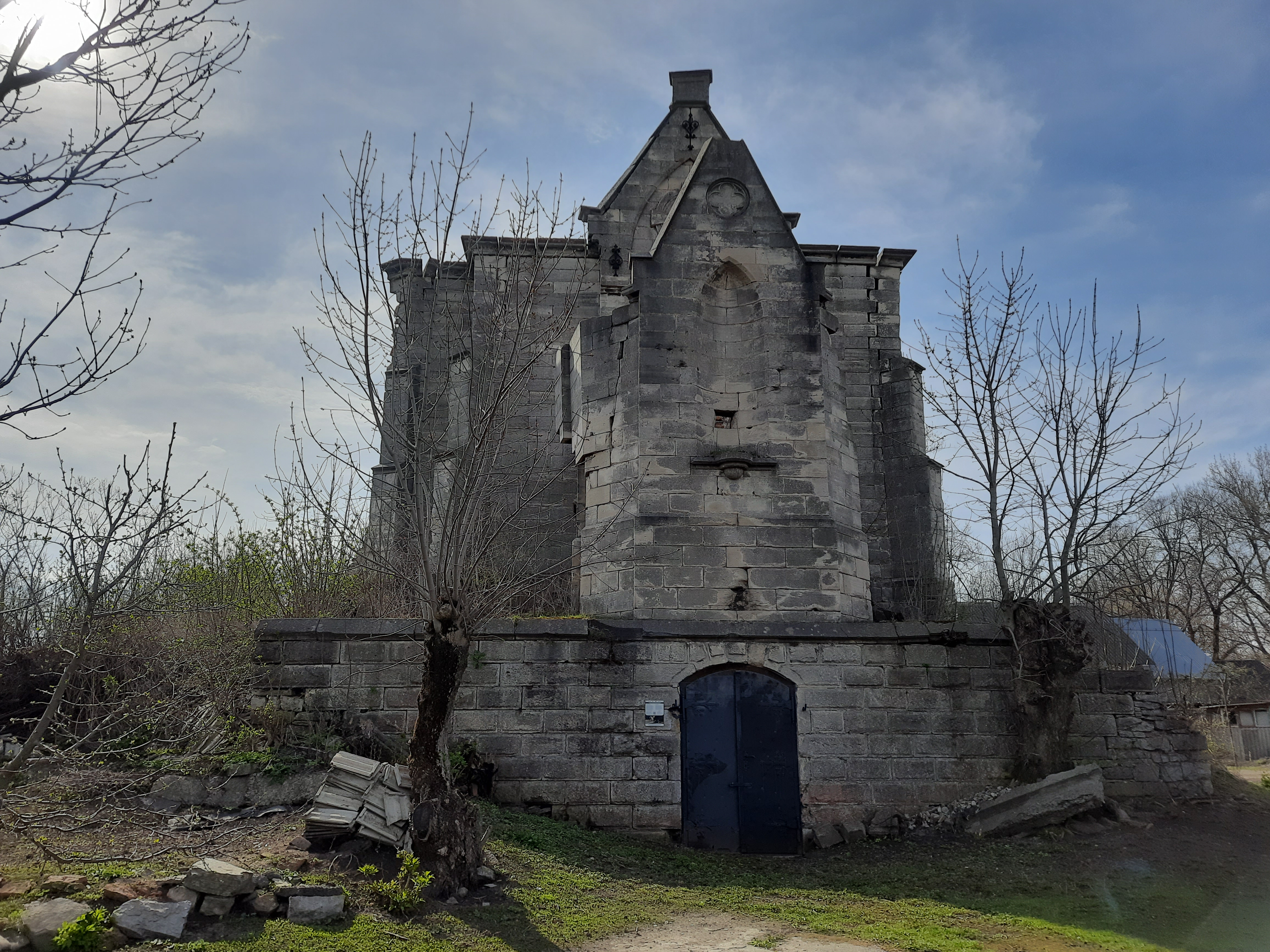
Gołuchowski family crypt

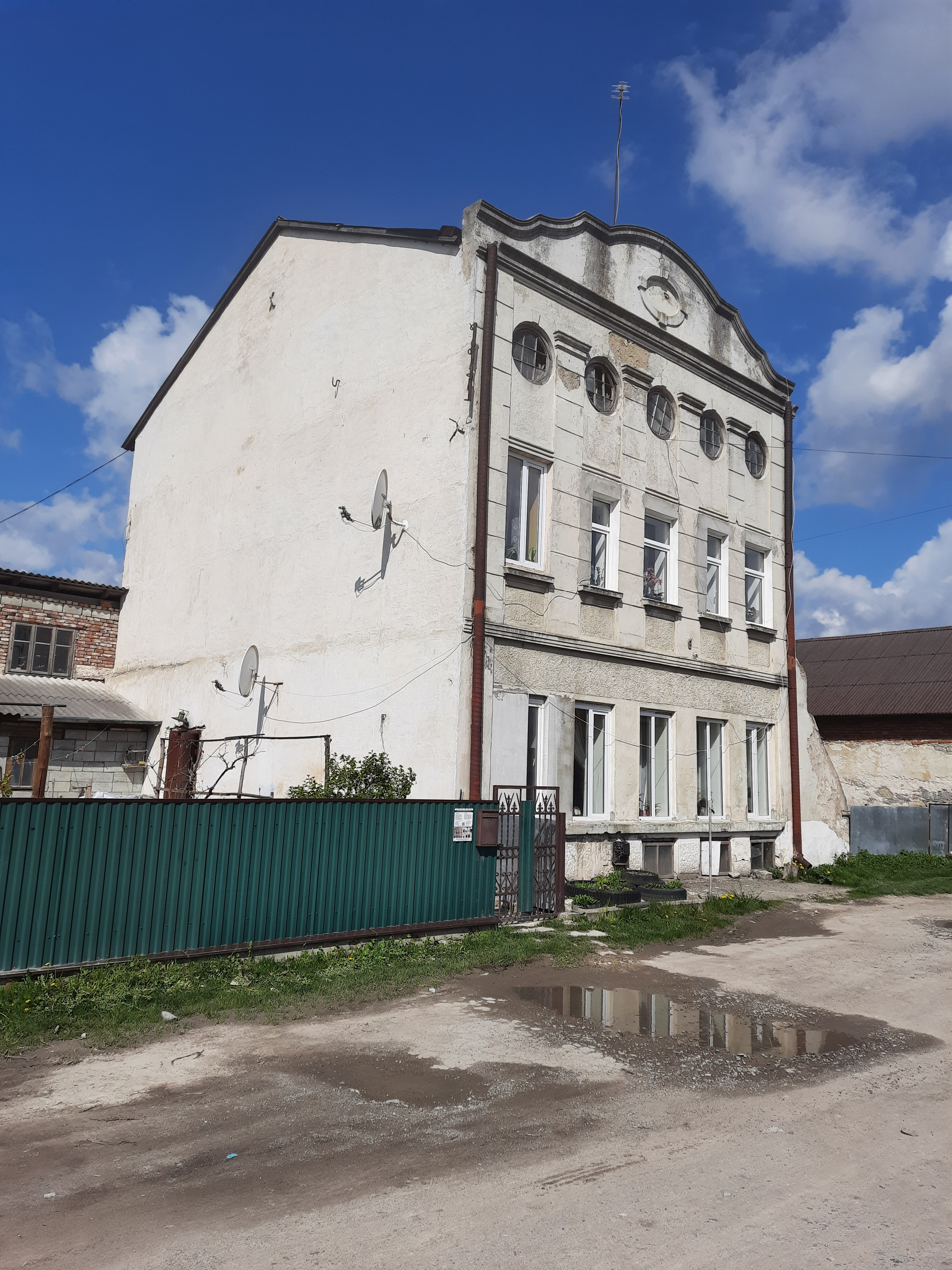
Former synagogue

== Additional External Resources ==
- Paintings of Jewish Skala before the war by Shoshana Eden

http://shoshana-eden.co.il/Eng

- Bibliography for Skala Researchers
- Tracy Abraham, To Speak for the Silenced (Dvorah Publishing Company, 2007)
- Skala Monument in Holon, Israel
- Skala on the River Zbrucz, edited by Skala Research Group and Skala Benevolent Society, 2010, translation of original Skala Yizkor Book, see https://kehilalinks.jewishgen.org/SkalaPodol/SkalaYizkorBook.html
