= Mali Chornokintsi =

Village in Ternopil Oblast, Ukraine

Mali Chornokintsi Малі Чорнокінці
- Village
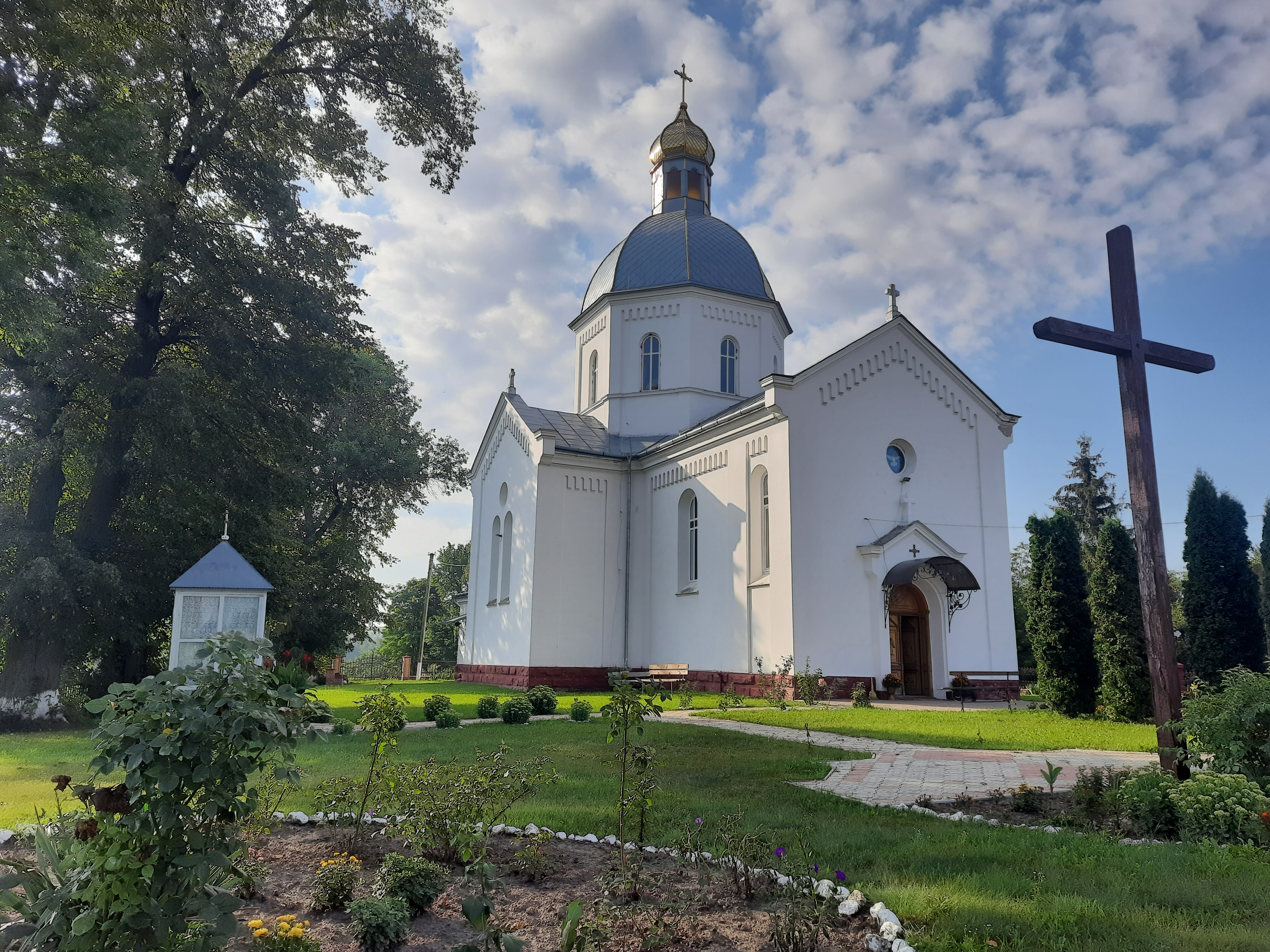
- Church of the Holy First Martyr Tekli inside the village

- Location within Ternopil Oblast Location within Ukraine
- Coordinates: 48°58′26″N 25°59′47″E
- Country: Ukraine
- Oblast: Ternopil Oblast
- Raion: Chortkiv
- Hromada: Kolyndiany

Area
  - Total: 2.17 km^{2} (0.84 sq mi)
- Elevation: 282 m (925 ft)

Population (2018)
  - Total: 411
  - Density: 189/km^{2} (491/sq mi)
- Time zone: UTC+2 (EET)
  - Summer (DST): UTC+3 (EEST)
- Postal code: 48525
- Telephone code: +380 3552

Mali Chornokintsi (Ukrainian: Малі Чорнокінці, lit. 'Small black ends') is a village in Kolydinay rural hromada, Chortkiv Raion, Ternopil Oblast, Ukraine. As of 2018, the village has a population of 411.

The village used to be the administrative center of the Malochornokinets village council. In September 2015, it was transferred to the Kolydinay rural hromada.

== Geography ==
Mali Chornokintsi is located on the banks of the Nichlava River, about 25 kilometres east of the Raion seat Chortkiv. The village has an average elevation of 282 metres (925 ft) above the sea level.

== Climate ==
Mali Chornokintsi has a Humid Continental Climate (Dfb). It receives the most rainfall in July, with an average precipitation of 100 mm; and the least rainfall in January, with an average precipitation of 36 mm.

Climate data for Mali Chornokintsi
Month	Jan	Feb	Mar	Apr	May	Jun	Jul	Aug	Sep	Oct	Nov	Dec	Year
Mean daily maximum °C (°F)	−0.9 (30.4)	1.1 (34.0)	6.9 (44.4)	14.5 (58.1)	20.0 (68.0)	23.2 (73.8)	25.0 (77.0)	24.6 (76.3)	19.4 (66.9)	12.7 (54.9)	6.6 (43.9)	1.2 (34.2)	12.9 (55.2)
Daily mean °C (°F)	−3.4 (25.9)	−1.9 (28.6)	2.6 (36.7)	9.6 (49.3)	15.2 (59.4)	18.7 (65.7)	20.6 (69.1)	20.0 (68.0)	15.1 (59.2)	8.9 (48.0)	3.8 (38.8)	−1.2 (29.8)	9.0 (48.2)
Mean daily minimum °C (°F)	−6.1 (21.0)	−5.1 (22.8)	−1.7 (28.9)	4.3 (39.7)	9.8 (49.6)	13.7 (56.7)	15.7 (60.3)	15.2 (59.4)	10.7 (51.3)	5.3 (41.5)	1.2 (34.2)	−3.6 (25.5)	5.0 (40.9)
Average rainfall mm (inches)	36 (1.4)	39 (1.5)	46 (1.8)	56 (2.2)	69 (2.7)	89 (3.5)	100 (3.9)	70 (2.8)	65 (2.6)	45 (1.8)	43 (1.7)	42 (1.7)	700 (27.6)
Source: Climate-Data.org
