= Nichlavka =

River in Ukraine

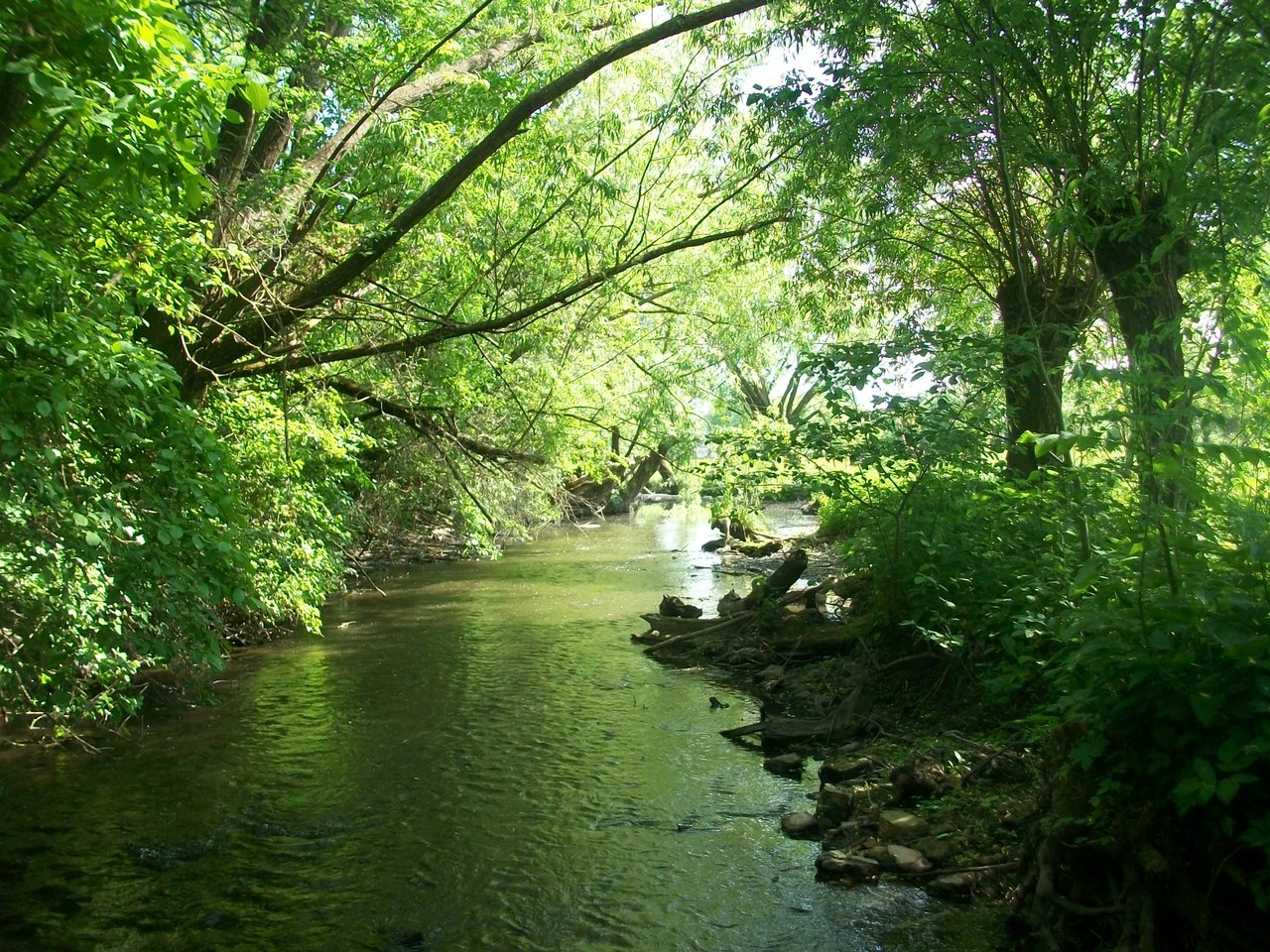
- Nichlavka in Shmankivtsi
- Native name: Нічлавка (Ukrainian)

Location
- Country: Ukraine

Physical characteristics
- Source
  - location: Sukhostav
  - coordinates: 49°09′41″N 25°48′32″E
- Mouth: Nichlava
  - coordinates: 48°57′14″N 25°58′33″E
- Length: 42 km (26 mi)

The Nichlavka is a river in Ukraine, within the Chortkiv Raion of the Ternopil Oblast. Right tributary of the Nichlava (Dniester basin).

== Description and location ==
Length 42 km. The valley is V-shaped. The floodplain is bilateral. The river is moderately winding.

It originates northwest of the village of Sukhostav. It flows first to the southeast, then to the south, in the estuary– again to the southeast. It flows into the Nichlava north of the village of Davydkivtsi.

== Tributaries ==
- Right: Zhabiachui Potik, Oryshka.
- Left: Strilka (Rudka Mala).

== Settlements ==
Above the river are the following villages and settlements (from the sources to the mouth): Sukhostav, Yabluniv, Kopychyntsi, Kotivka, Teklivka, Hadynkivtsi, Shvaikivtsi, Shmankivtsi, Kolyndiany.

== Sources ==
- Гуменюк Л. Чому річка — «НІЧЛАВА»?… / Людмила Гуменюк // Голос народу. — 2017. — No. 16 (21 квіт.). — S. 5. — (Наше).
- Річки України, басейн Дністра
- Управління екології та природних ресурсів Тернопільської ОДА
- Публічна кадастрова карта України
