= Shvaikivtsi =

Shvaikivtsi Швайківці
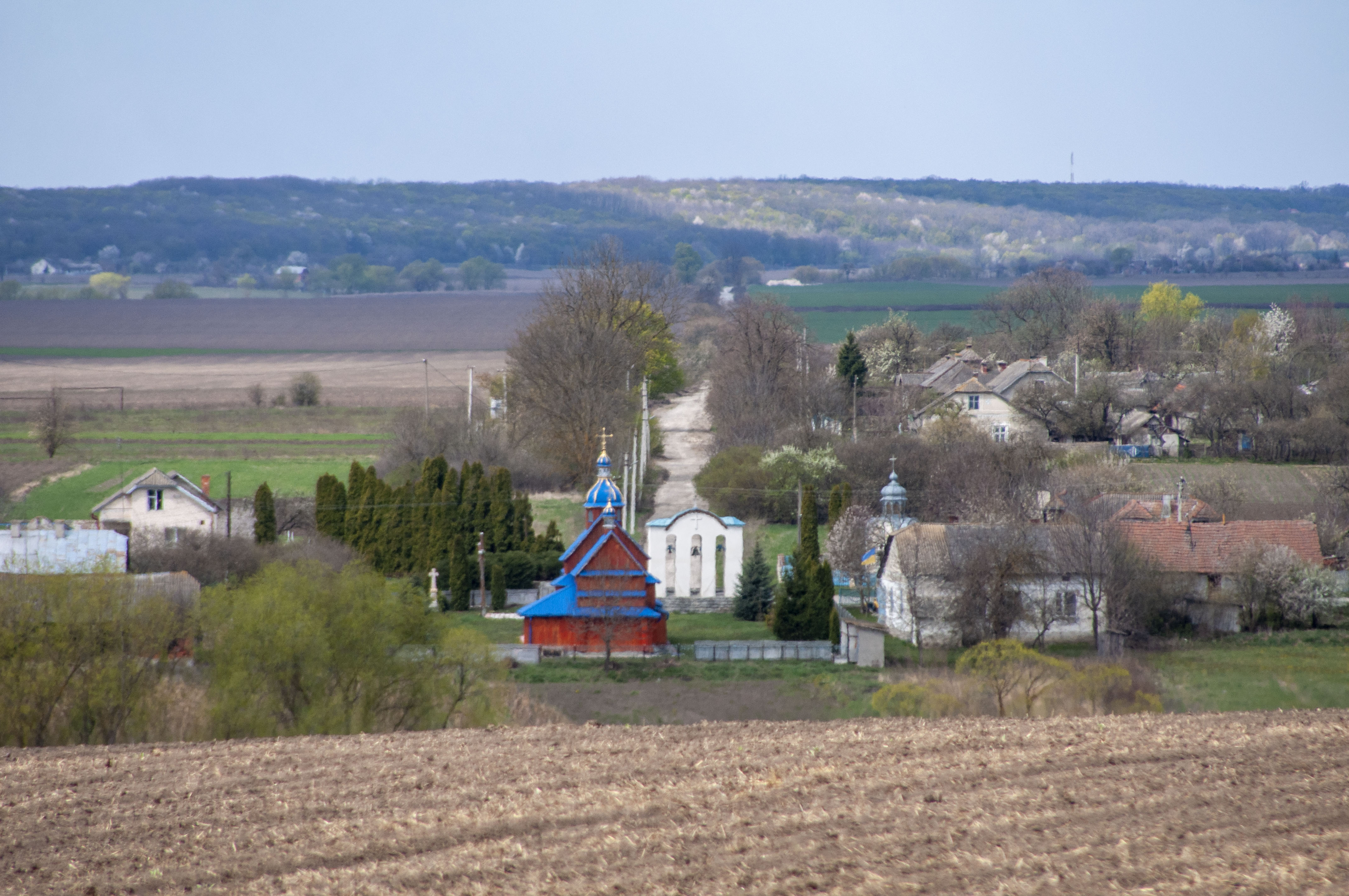

- Location in Ternopil Oblast Shvaikivtsi (Ukraine)
- Coordinates: 49°01′15″N 25°56′03″E
- Country: Ukraine
- Oblast: Ternopil Oblast
- Raion: Chortkiv Raion
- Hromada: Zavodske settlement hromada

Population (2021)
  - Total: 135
- Time zone: UTC+2 (EET)
  - Summer (DST): UTC+3 (EEST)
- Postal code: 48516

Shvaikivtsi (Ukrainian: Швайківці; Russian: Швайковцы; Polish: Szwajkowce) is a village in Zavodske Settlement Hromada, Chortkiv Raion, Ternopil Oblast, in Ukraine. It was the administrative center of the Shvaykiv Village Council, until it was absorbed by the Zavodske settlement hromada in November 2020.

== Geography ==
Shvaikivtsi is located on the west bank of the Nichlavka River, a tributary of the Nichlava in the Dniester basin. It is 12 km (7.5 mi) away from the district center and 5 km (3.1 mi) from the nearest railway station, Hadynkivtsi.

== Toponymy ==
The village's name derives from Polish and Ukrainian terms meaning stitching awl, a tool used by shoemakers, as shoemaking was a facet of Shvaikivtsi's economy in the 15th century.

Historian Mykola Krykun has compiled names the village went by during Polish rule: Sewoykofce (as recorded by Guillaume Le Vasseur de Beauplan), and Szwajkowce (recorded at least five times across civil and land registers of the Polish government during the 17th century).

== History ==
=== Ancient period ===
In 2007, archaeologists and students from the National Academy of Sciences of Ukraine and Ternopil Pedagogical University uncovered a burial mound from the 7th or 6th centuries BC. Items excavated included tableware, weapons, protective chainmail, and a comb adorned with a decoration of a horse. Lead archaeologist Mykola Bandrivsky stated that the site was likely to be a burial site for a Neuri military leader or aristocrat.

=== Medieval period ===
In 1430, the region that today contains Shvaikivtsi was incorporated by the Kingdom of Poland into the Podolian Voivodeship, an administrative body and local government.

Dawid of the noble Buczacki family became its governor (or voivode) in 1484. In 1485, Buczacki's sons purchased the land that would become Shvaikivtsi from members of the Fredro family. The acknowledgement of sale document–signed by King Casimir IV Jagiellon–is the first written mention of a settlement at the site of Shvaikivtsi, which records the village under the name Swajkowce.

At this time, Shvaikivtsi's residents predominantly worked in agriculture, cattle farming, shoemaking, and the production of furs.

=== Modern period ===
Few written materials about Shvaikivtsi from the 1500s and 1600s remain. According to the 1569 tax register of the Podolian Voivodeship, compiled by royal captain and customs officer Stanisław Jacimirski, the village had come under the ownership of a family named Golinsky. The village had three plowmen, each of whom was required to pay 10 groschens per plow.

Polish rule in the area would be briefly interrupted in 1672, when the Ottoman Empire captured the voivode and began governing the area as the Podolia Eyalet. Shvaikivtsi appears in the eyalet's 1681 tax register, where it is described as an "abandoned" village that is "not far from Chortkiv." The register notes that Shvaikivtsi contains a "destroyed" watermill and pond, but nonetheless values the village at 5,000 akçe. Podolia returned to Poland in 1699 with the Treaty of Karlowitz. Stefan Aleksander Potocki assumed control of lands in Ternopil, including Shvaikivtsi. Historian Vasyl Slobodian posits that it is likely Shvaikivtsi had already been owned by the Potocki family before Ottoman rule, hence the direct transfer of the lands after the Treaty.

People had returned to Shvaikivtsi by 1708, as Bishop Yosyf Shumlyansky recorded the presence of a Greek Catholic church, the Exaltation of the Holy Cross Church, and a priest. A church visitor wrote in 1733 that Shvaikivtsi was now owned by Makowiecki, a master of the hunt. In 1758, visiting priest Anton Onufrievich wrote that Shvaikivtsi's church had been rebuilt in the same location the previous year. He also noted the presence of a Jewish community in Shvaikivtsi. Under Polish rule, these communities were self-administering, with their own local governments (Qahals) and tax system. Shvaikivtsi's Jewish community ran a garden at the time of Onufrievich's visit.

In 1772, following the First Partition of Poland, the region of Podolia came under Austrian control, forming part of the Kingdom of Galicia and Lodomeria. Shvaikivtsi remained under Austrian control until 1918, with the exception of 1809-1815, when it was briefly under Russian rule. While under Austria, Shvaikivtsi was recorded as having two shops, as well as two inns; the later were run by Jewish owners.

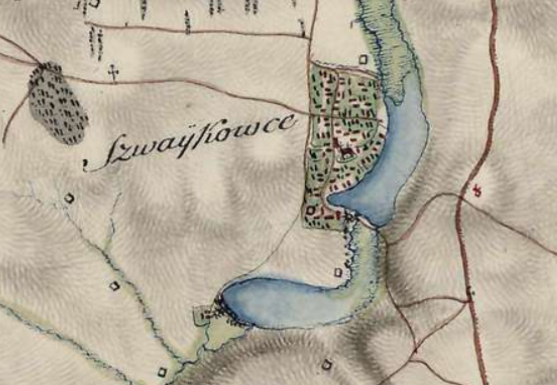
Shvaikivtsi on the map of von Mig, 18th century.

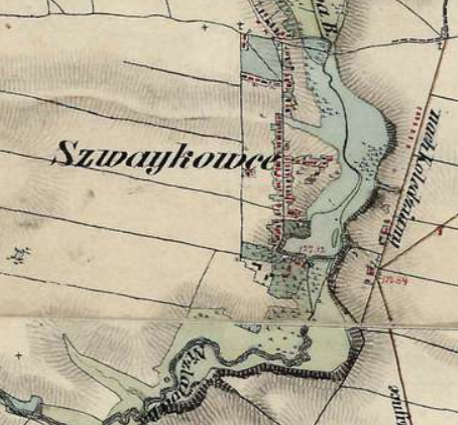
Shvaikivtsi on the Austrian topographic map, 1861–1864.

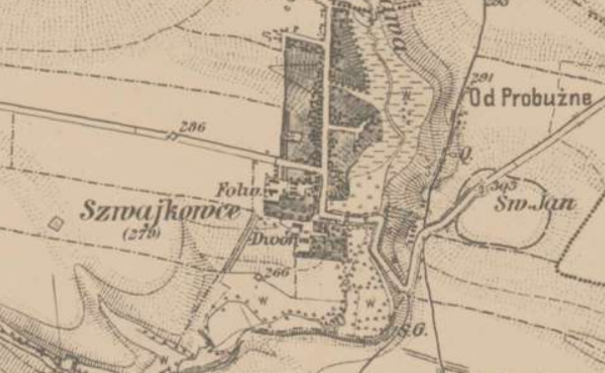
Shvaikivtsi on the Austrian topographic map, 1869–1887.

According to Austrian Galicia financial records, the parishes of Shvaikivtsi and nearby Hadynkivtsi merged by 1783, and its church became subordinate to Hadynkivtsi's Church of the Nativity of the Virgin Mary, with both sharing a priest. Historian Slobodian suggests Shvaikivtsi was likely less affluent than Hadynkivtsi, due to the difference in building quality between the villages' respective churches. In 1785, Shvaikivtsi was recorded as having 306 residents.

Shvaikivtsi being administratively subordinate to Hadynkivtsi led to tensions that culminated in 1842, when Shvaikivtsi's villagers submitted a written request for their own independent parish to their district leaders. They alleged that the priest favoured Hadynkivtsi over Shvaikivtsi, and that Hadynkivtsi residents had violently deterred them from attending that town's church. The request was not fulfilled at the time.

By 1880, Shvaikivtsi had a population of 633 people in 96 houses. Several villagers emigrated to Canada, coinciding with a period of time in which millions of Ukrainians - especially Jewish Ukrainians - emigrated to North America between the 1880s and 1914.

=== Contemporary period ===
In 1906, Prosvita, a society centred around preserving and developing Ukrainian culture, established a reading room in Shvaikivtsi. These rooms offered Ukrainian newspapers and literature, and were used to hold cultural events such as dances. Prosvita initially had no permanent location in Shvaikivtsi, renting out the rooms of villagers to conduct its activities, until Shvaikivtsi's residents paid for the construction of a physical location for Prosvita in 1926.

During the First World War, at least three Shvaikivtsi villagers joined the Ukrainian Sich Riflemen in 1918 for Austria-Hungary. Austria-Hungary dissolved in 1918, and the Chortkiv Raion, including Shvaikivtsi, was retaken by Poland, governed under the Tarnopol Voivodeship.

Following the 1939 Soviet invasion of Poland, the Raion briefly became part of the Ukrainian SSR, until the Soviet Union was invaded by Nazi Germany in 1941. The region, and Shvaikivtsi, was forced under the General Government between June 1941 and March 1944. Between the 20th and 21 July 1941, two Shvaikivtsi villagers - Dmytro Yuriyovych and Anton Pylypovich - were shot by the Soviet secret police in Uman during the NKVD prisoner massacres. At least two Shvaikivtsi residents joined the Ukrainian Insurgent Army, and more than thirty other residents died fighting against the Nazi regime.

After the 1991 dissolution of the Soviet Union, Shvaikivtsi, as part of the Ternopil region, joined an independent Ukraine.

== Local legends ==
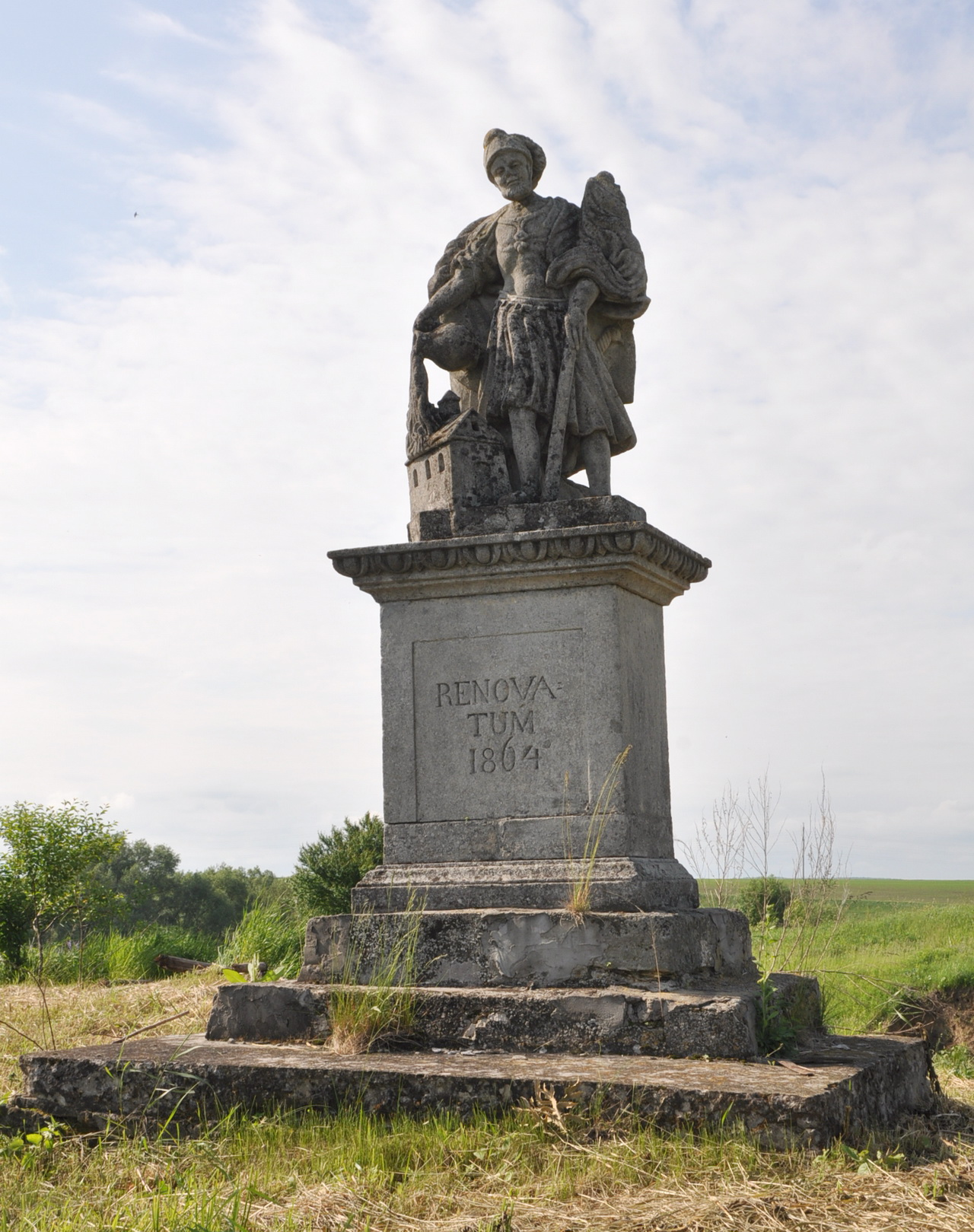
The statue of Saint Florian in Shvaikivtsi, photographed in 2019.

Local legend provides that, while Shvaikivtsi was under Hapsburg rule, an Austrian Royal Dragoon officer died while extinguishing a fire in Shvaikivtsi. Village lore holds that a statue of Saint Florian, patron saint of firefighters, was erected in Shvaikivtsi as a tribute to this officer. While the date of the statue's installation is unknown, its inscription provides that it was restored in 1864.

Different versions of the story exist in local reporting. In one version of the story, this fire broke out in the yard of a manor belonging to the Lanckoroński family; however, there are no records of such a manor existing in Shvaikivtsi. In Chortkiv District Council's retelling, the fire broke out at a farm, and spread to other properties in Shvaikivtsi.

== Education ==
In 1910, the Austrian government funded the construction of a one-grade school house; classes were taught in the Ukrainian language.

Once the region was taken over by the Second Polish Republic, the school taught two grades, in both Polish and Ukrainian. Shvaikivtsi children who completed their primary education could pursue secondary education in the neighbouring village of Hadynkivtsi, completing six grades overall. The school was operational until 2004.

== Sights ==
- Shvaikivtsi Mound I (Western Podolia group of Scythian times) is a newly discovered object of cultural heritage, protection number 1479.
- The settlement of Shvaikivtsi II (Bronze Age; Early Iron Age; Trypillian culture; Chernyakhov culture) is a newly discovered object of cultural heritage, protection number 1850.
- A monument to fellow villagers killed in the German-Soviet War (1985).
- A monument to the religious figure V. Bayrak (2004, sculptor D. Pylypiak).
- A sculpture of Saint Florian (before 1864).

== Notable people ==
- Volodymyr Bairak (monastic name Vitalii; 1907–1946), a Ukrainian religious figure and Basilian hieromonk.

== In literature ==
In 2022, Liudmyla Humeniuk published the book Shvaikivtsi in the course of centuries.

== See also ==
- Stavky (river)

== Sources ==
- (in Ukrainian) Антохів М., Уніят В., Швайківці // Ternopil Encyclopedic Dictionary: in 4 v. / editorial board: H. Yavorskyi and other, Ternopil: "Zbruch", 2008, V. 3: П—Я, S. 628. — ISBN 978-966-528-279-2.
- (in Ukrainian) Мельничук Б., Уніят В., Федечко М., Швайківці // Ternopil Oblast. History of cities and villages: in 3 v. / Ternopil: "Terno-graph", 2014, V. 3: М—Ш, S. 519—520. — ISBN 978-966-457-246-7.
- Boniecki A. Herbarz polski: wiadomości historyczno-genealogiczne o rodach szlacheckich. — Warszawa : Warszawskie Towarzystwo Akcyjne S. Orgelbranda S[yn]ów), 1909. — Cz. 1. — T. 13. — S. 331—349. (пол.)
- (in Ukrainian) Швайківці // Чортківська округа. Історично-мемуарний збірник / ред. колегія О. Соневицької та інші. — Париж — Сидней — Торонто : НТШ, Український архів, 1974. — Т. XXVII. — P. 229—230. : іл.
