= Exaltation of the Holy Cross Church, Shvaikivtsi =

Greek Catholic church in Shvaikivtsi, Ukraine

Exaltation of the Holy Cross Church Церква Воздвиження Чесного Хреста Господнього
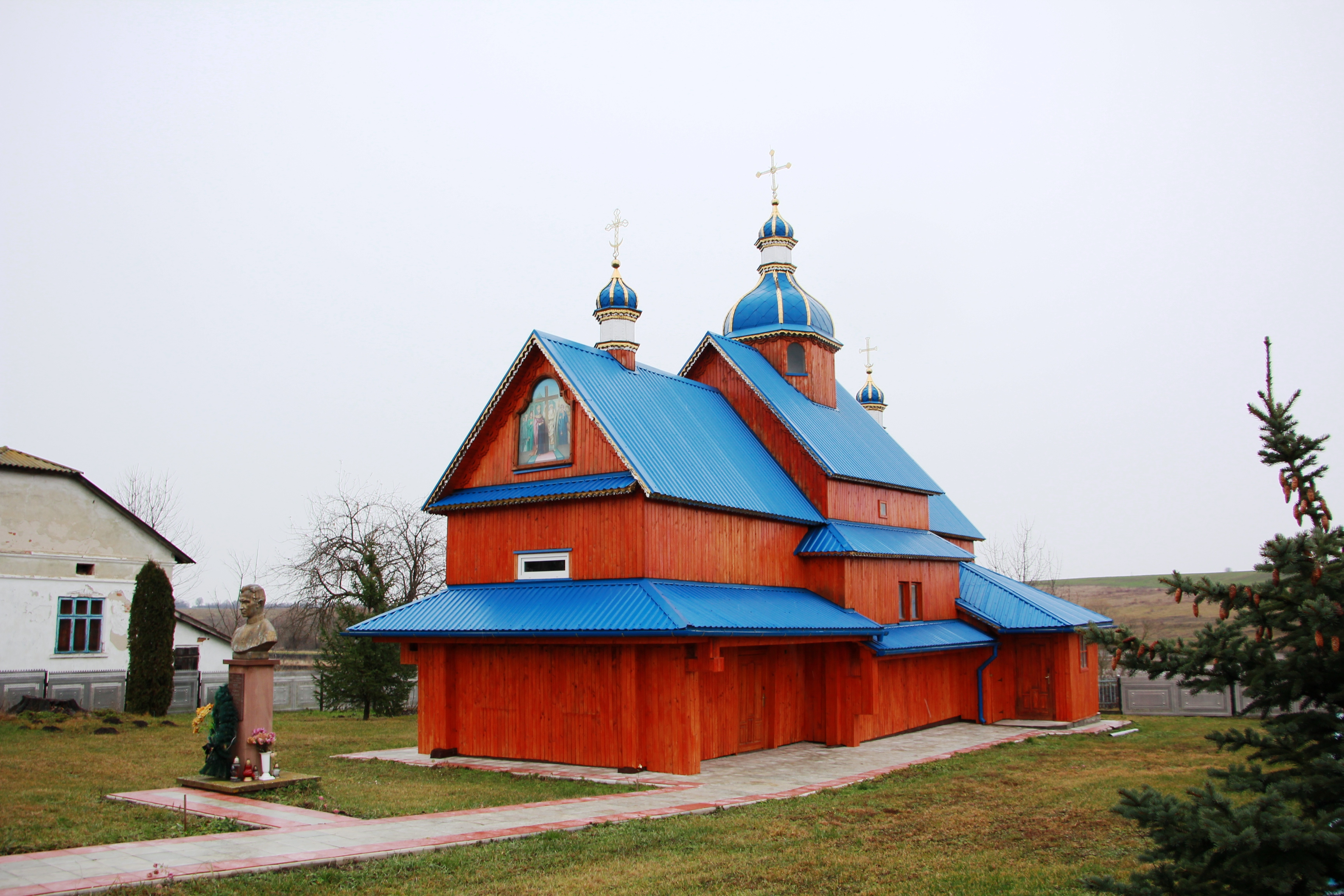

- Location within Ternopil Oblast

Religion
- Affiliation: Ukrainian Greek Catholic Church
- Ecclesiastical or organisational status: Active
- Status: Church

Location
- Location: Shvaikivtsi
- Coordinates: 49°01′09″N 25°56′11″E

Architecture
- Type: Church
- Completed: 1734

The Exaltation of the Holy Cross Church (Ukrainian: Церква Воздвиження Чесного Хреста Господнього) Greek Catholic Parish Church (UGCC) in Shvaikivtsi of the Zavodske settlement hromada of the Chortkiv Raion of the Ternopil Oblast.

== History ==
The earliest written record of the parish dates back to the 11th-13th centuries, when it was an Orthodox community under the jurisdiction of the Ecumenical Patriarchate of Constantinople. In 1732–1733, the parish received a general visitation from Fr. Sylvestr Malskyi, OSBM.

A church was built in 1734 thanks to donations from parishioners. This structure was rebuilt in 1758, the same year the parish was visited by Fr. Antonii Onufriievych. The parish remained Greek Catholic from the 18th century until 1946. It was then part of the ROC from 1946 to 1957, after which it was closed by Soviet authorities from 1958 to 1989. The church was briefly returned to the ROC from 1989 to 1990.

Modern Era and Parish Life In 1990, the parish returned to the UGCC. As a daughter parish, it is served by priests from the village of Hadynkivtsi. In 2004, on Independence Day, a new chapel dedicated to All Saints of the Ukrainian People was consecrated.

The parish has approximately 150 members and is served by an active Altar Society. The priest provides catechesis to the community.

On the village grounds, there is a monument to Saint Florian, built in 1864 with funds from Mr. Rudrof. A separate monument dedicated to Blessed Martyr Hieromonk Vitalii Bairak, OSBM, was consecrated by Bishop Irynei Bilyk.

== Abbots ==
- at. Ivan Melchan (1718—1743),
- at. Litinskyi,
- at. Stefan Savichevskyi,
- at. Makar Savichevskyi (1784-1817),
- at. Mykhailo Struminskyi,
- at. Yakiv Shankovskyi,
- at. Ivan Senatovych (1838-1840),
- at. Semen Lukasevych (1840-1842),
- at. Oleksii Navrotskyi (1842-1843),
- at. Fylyp Holinatyi (1843-1844, 1845-1847),
- at. Dmytro Khodorovskyi (1844-1845),
- at. Mykola Chaplinskyi (1847-1848),
- at. Yakiv Horbachevskyi (1848-1850),
- at. Tom Boratynskyi (1850-1855),
- at. Ivan Kornii (1855-1890),
- at. Klyment Sonevytskyi (1891-1928),
- at. Dean Vasyl Kvik (since 1990).

== Sources ==
- Парафія с. Швайківці. Церква Воздвиження Чесного Хреста Господнього // Бучацька єпархія УГКЦ. Парафії, монастирі, храми. Шематизм / Автор концепції Куневич Б.; керівник проекту, науковий редактор Стоцький Я. — Тернопіль : ТОВ «Новий колір», 2014. — С. 179. : іл. — ISBN 978-966-2061-30-7.
- Слободян, В. До історії сіл Гадинківці та Швайківці і їх церков // Християнська сакральна традиція: Віра, духовність, мистецтво. Матеріали ІI Міжнародної наукової конференції, м. Львів, 24-25 листопада 2010 р. (Апологет). — Львів, 2010. — С. 245—265.
- Анісомова, М. Пустімо в серце чесноти Мудрості, Віри, Надії й Любові // Голос народу. — 2012. — № 27 (29 червня). — С. 5. — (Істини).
