= Vyhoda =

Vyhoda may refer to several places in Ukraine:

- Vyhoda, Kalush Raion, Ivano-Frankivsk Oblast
- Vyhoda, Kopychyntsi urban hromada, Chortkiv Raion, Ternopil Oblast
- Vyhoda, Melnytsia-Podilska settlement hromada, Chortkiv Raion, Ternopil Oblast
- Vyhoda, Zalishchyky urban hromada, Chortkiv Raion, Ternopil Oblast
- Vyhoda rural hromada, Odesa Raion, Odesa Oblast
