= Palace of Czartoryski-Dzieduszycki =

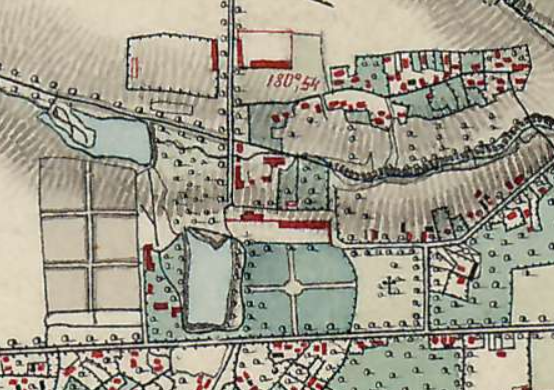
- The palace in Yabluniv on an Austrian topographical map, late 19th century.
- Interactive map of Palace of Czartoryski-Dzieduszycki
- Location: Yabluniv, Kopychyntsi Hromada, Chortkiv Raion, Ternopil Oblast, Ukraine

Palace of Czartoryski-Dzieduszycki is a historic building in Yabluniv of the Kopychyntsi Hromada of the Chortkiv Raion of the Ternopil Oblast.

== History ==
It was built in 1820. From that time, a masterfully crafted staircase with railings by the master Ivan Shastkov has been preserved.

In 1884, Ivan Franko and Volodyslav Fedorovych stayed in the two-story mansion of the landowner Czartoryski. The writer worked in the library with documents and materials about the Ukrainian patriotic Fedorovych family.

In 1991, a memorial plaque to Ivan Franko was installed on the facade of the palace.

Near the estate there are four ponds and an old park, which was laid out in the 1840s by the Dzieduszyckis, who invited specialists from France. Today, the area has a beech alley, centuries-old trees: Manchurian walnut, purple beech, American pines, a 200-year-old small-leaved linden, and two poplars 150–200 years old.

== Sources ==
- Rąkowski G., Luboński, P. Podole. Przewodnik po Ukrainie Zachodniej. Część II. — Pruszków: Rewasz, 2006, s. 191–192, ISBN 83-89188-46-5. OCLC 69287000.
- Андрій Бондаренко. "Яблунів". Україна Інкогніта.
