= Rudky (village) =

Rural locality in Ternopil Oblast, Ukraine

Rudky Рудки
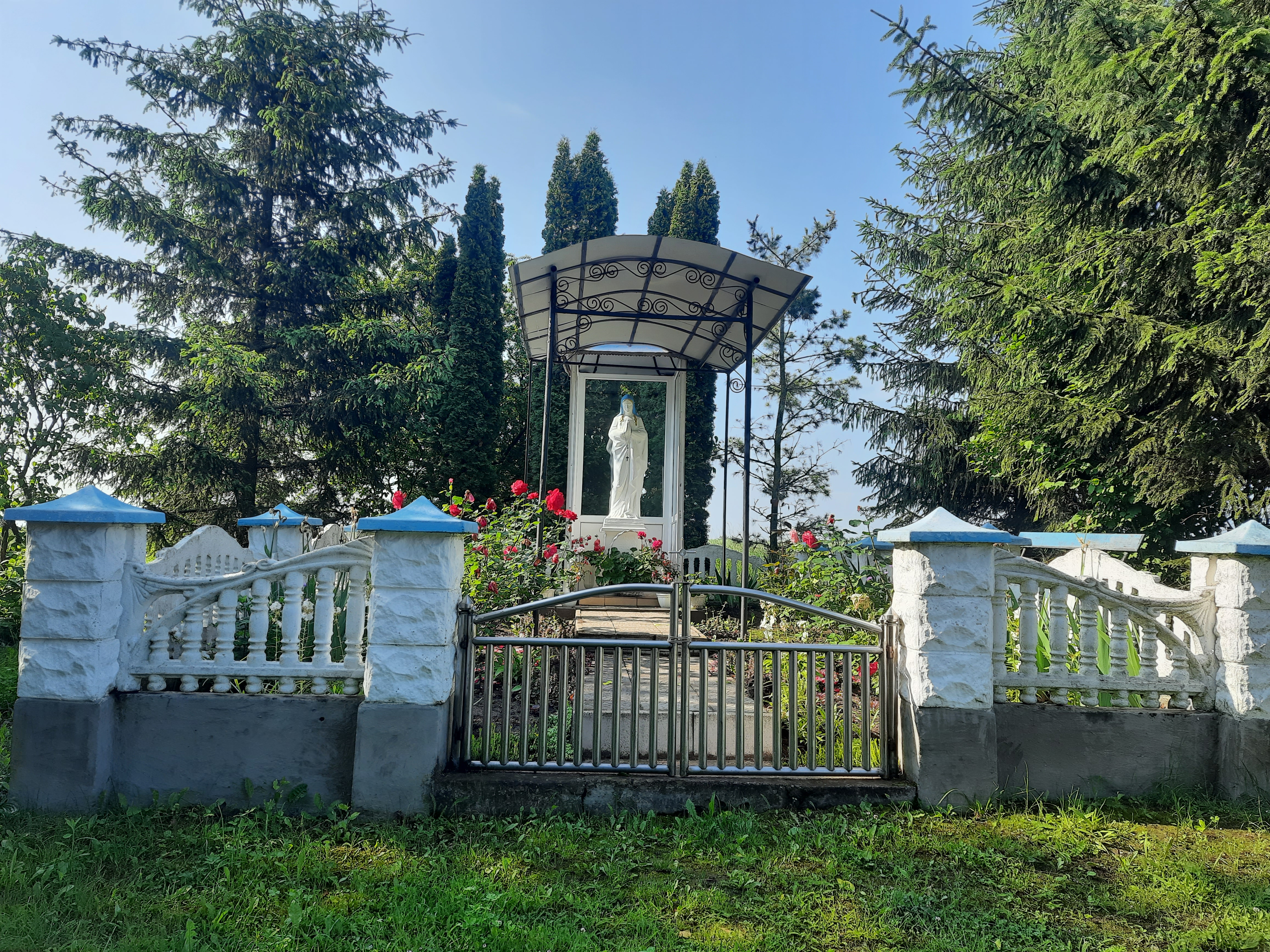
- The chapel

- Location in Ternopil Oblast
- Coordinates: 49°9′56″N 25°53′7″E
- Country: Ukraine
- Oblast: Ternopil Oblast
- Raion: Chortkiv Raion
- Hromada: Kopychyntsi urban hromada
- Time zone: UTC+2 (EET)
  - Summer (DST): UTC+3 (EEST)
- Postal code: 48265

Rudky (Ukrainian: Рудки) is a village in Kopychyntsi urban hromada, Chortkiv Raion, Ternopil Oblast, Ukraine.

== History ==
It has been known from the 19th century as a hamlet of the town of Sukhostav (now a village in Chortkiv Raion).

Until 19 July 2020, it belonged to the Husiatyn Raion. From 8 December 2020, it has been part of the Kopychyntsi urban hromada.

== Sources ==
- (in Ukrainian) Вас. Ханас, Рудки // Ternopil Encyclopedic Dictionary: in 4 v. / editorial board: H. Yavorskyi and other, Ternopil: "Zbruch", 2008, V. 3: П—Я, S. 205. — ISBN 978-966-528-279-2.
- "Rudki, wzgórze". Geographical Dictionary of the Kingdom of Poland (in Polish). 9. Warszawa: Kasa im. Józefa Mianowskiego. 1888. p. 915.
