= Tudoriv =

Rural locality in Ternopil Oblast, Ukraine

Tudoriv Тудорів
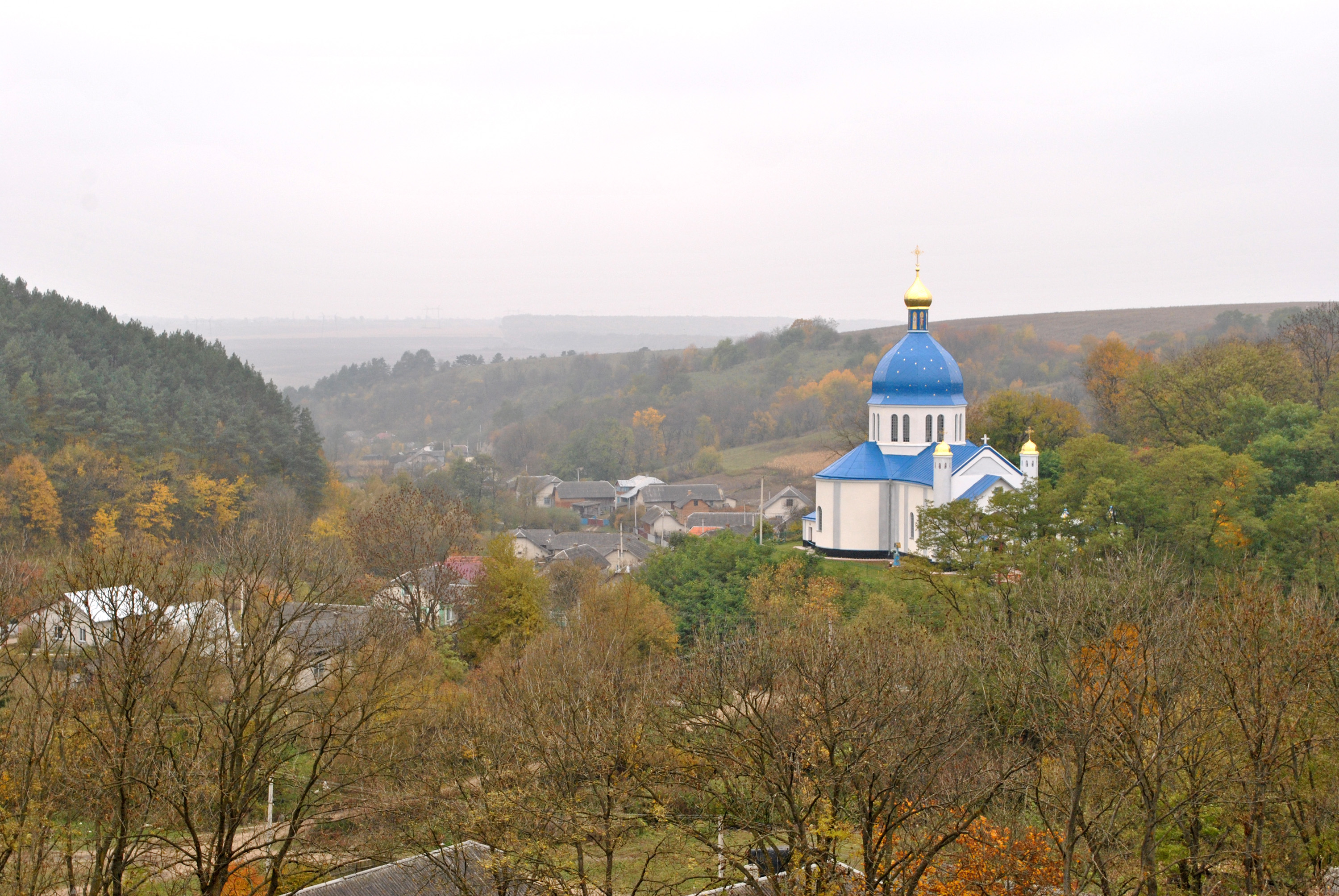
- Saint Nicholas Church, Tudoriv

- Location in Ternopil Oblast
- Coordinates: 49°6′52″N 25°47′21″E
- Country: Ukraine
- Oblast: Ternopil Oblast
- Raion: Chortkiv Raion
- Hromada: Kopychyntsi urban hromada
- Time zone: UTC+2 (EET)
  - Summer (DST): UTC+3 (EEST)
- Postal code: 48266

Tudoriv (Ukrainian: Тудорів) is a village in Kopychyntsi urban hromada, Chortkiv Raion, Ternopil Oblast, Ukraine.

== History ==
The first written mention is from 1442.

After the liquidation of the Husiatyn Raion on 19 July 2020, the village became part of the Chortkiv Raion.

== Religion ==
- two churches of St. Nicholas (1732, brick, restored in 1936, OCU; 1993, brick, UGCC)

== Sources ==
- (in Ukrainian) Гончарик І., Злочовська, О., Тудорів // Ternopil Encyclopedic Dictionary: in 4 v. / editorial board: H. Yavorskyi and other, Ternopil: "Zbruch", 2008, V. 3: П—Я, S. 474–475. — ISBN 978-966-528-279-2.
- "Tudorów, wś, pow. husiatyński". Geographical Dictionary of the Kingdom of Poland (in Polish). 12. Warszawa: Kasa im. Józefa Mianowskiego. 1892. p. 608.
- "Tudorów, wś, pow. husiatyński". Geographical Dictionary of the Kingdom of Poland (in Polish). p. 666.
