= Ihor Sonevytsky =

Ukrainian musician (1926–2006)

Ihor Sonevytsky (Ukrainian: Ігор Михайлович Соневицький) (1926–2006) was a Ukrainian-born composer, conductor, pianist and musicologist.

== Life ==
Born on 2 January 1926 in Hadynkivtsi, Galicia (now in Western Ukraine), Ihor Sonevytsky was the son of Dr. Michael Sonevytsky (Ukrainian: Михайло Соневицький), a noted Ukrainian classical philologist, and Olha Sonevytsky, a journalist. He studied at the Vienna Musical Academy and completed his musical studies with a diploma in composition, conducting and piano performance from the Staatliche Hochschule fur Musik, Munich (1950) and the Ukrainian Free University, Munich (1961).

His family emigrated to the US short after. There he became a cofounder of the Ukrainian Music Institute of America, and served as its director from 1959 to 1961. In 1983 he established the Grazhda Music and Art Center of Greene County, New York.

Sonevytsky conducted five different Ukrainian choirs, organized and directed a Ukrainian string orchestra and opera ensemble, taught private students, and lectured at the Ukrainian Catholic University in Rome.

He wrote over 500 music-related articles for various newspapers and periodicals. He wrote several music books, including The Dictionary of Ukrainian Composers, which lists 522 Ukrainian composers from around the world.

He is the author of the opera "Star", the ballet "Cinderella", some chamber music, a series of piano works and a catalogue of choral and vocal music.

Sonevytsky became the first Ukrainian émigré composer to be published in his homeland, when the Ukrainian State Publishing House "Muzychna Ukraina" published a collection of his solo songs in 1993.
