= Oryshkivtsi, Chortkiv Raion, Ternopil Oblast =

Rural locality in Ternopil Oblast, Ukraine

Oryshkivtsi Оришківці
- Location in Ternopil Oblast
- Coordinates: 49°4′10″N 25°52′10″E
- Country: Ukraine
- Oblast: Ternopil Oblast
- Raion: Chortkiv Raion
- Hromada: Kopychyntsi urban hromada
- Time zone: UTC+2 (EET)
  - Summer (DST): UTC+3 (EEST)
- Postal code: 48272

Oryshkivtsi (Ukrainian: Оришківці) is a village in Kopychyntsi urban hromada, Chortkiv Raion, Ternopil Oblast, Ukraine.

== History ==
The first written mention is from 1443.

After the liquidation of the Husiatyn Raion on 19 July 2020, the village became part of the Chortkiv Raion.

== Religion ==
- two churches of the Intercession (1748, wooden; 1994, brick).

== Notable people ==
- Yaroslav Sukhyi (born 1951), Ukrainian politician, Governor of Ternopil Oblast (2010)

== Sources ==
- (in Ukrainian) Мельничук Б., Уніят В., Оришківці // Ternopil Encyclopedic Dictionary: in 4 v. / editorial board: H. Yavorskyi and other, Ternopil: "Zbruch", 2005, V. 2: К—О, 706 s. — ISBN 966-528-199-2.
- "Oryszkowce, wś, pow. husiatyński". Geographical Dictionary of the Kingdom of Poland (in Polish). 7. Warszawa: Kasa im. Józefa Mianowskiego. 1886. p. 608.
