= Maidan, Ternopil Oblast =

Rural locality in Ternopil Oblast, Ukraine

Maidan Майдан
- Location in Ternopil Oblast
- Coordinates: 49°5′30″N 25°48′42″E
- Country: Ukraine
- Oblast: Ternopil Oblast
- Raion: Chortkiv Raion
- Hromada: Kopychyntsi urban hromada
- Time zone: UTC+2 (EET)
  - Summer (DST): UTC+3 (EEST)
- Postal code: 48266

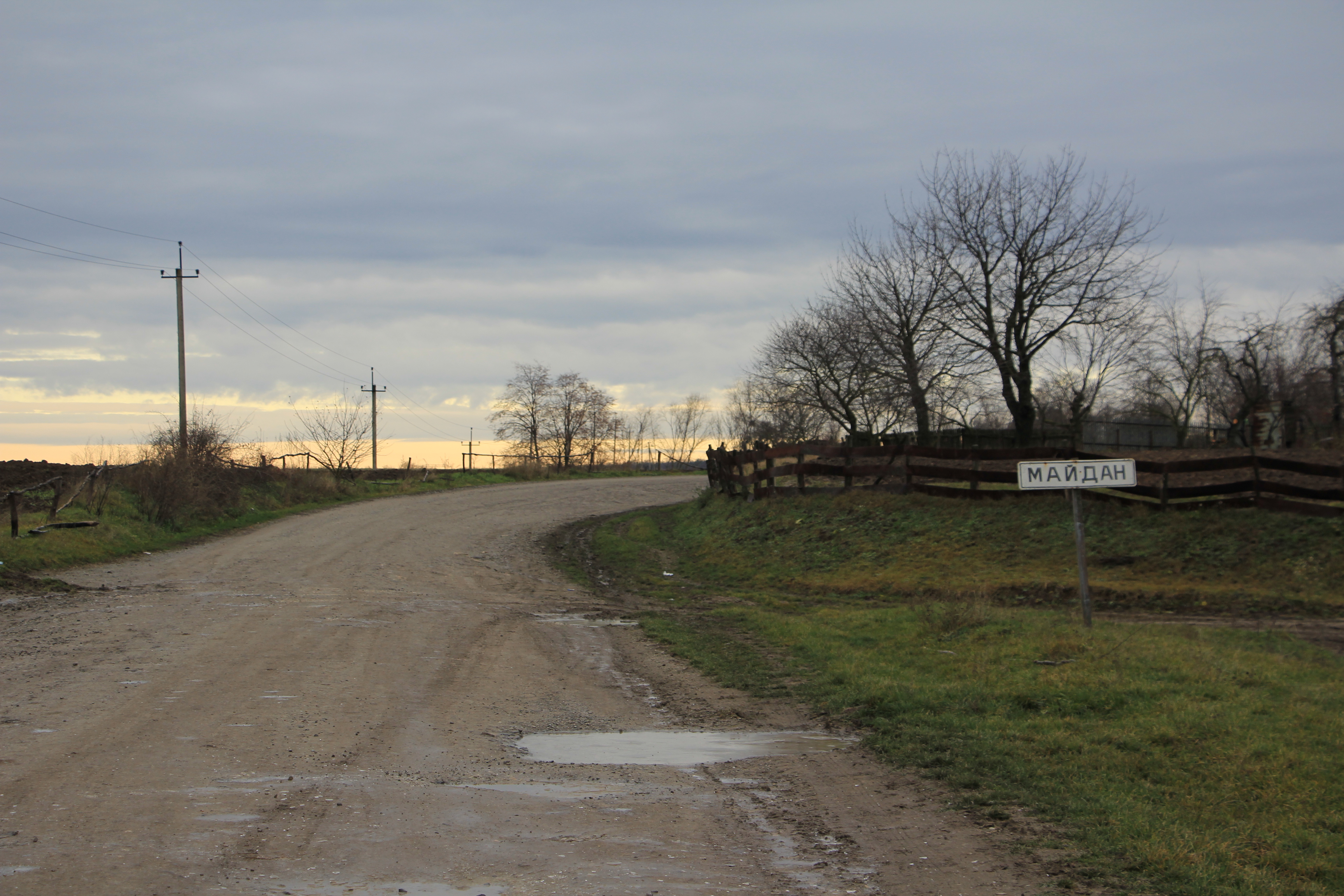
Entrance to Maidan

Maidan (Ukrainian: Майдан) is a village in Kopychyntsi urban hromada, Chortkiv Raion, Ternopil Oblast, Ukraine.

== History ==
Known from the 18th century.

After the liquidation of the Husiatyn Raion on 19 July 2020, the village became part of the Chortkiv Raion.

== Religion ==
- two churches of the Holy Trinity (2009, brick; wooden; transported in 1927 from Skorodyntsi, now Chortkiv Raion).

== Famous people ==
In 1944, the Ukrainian poet Andrii Malyshko visited the village.

== Sources ==
- "Majdan (8)". Geographical Dictionary of the Kingdom of Poland (in Polish). 5. Warszawa: Kasa im. Józefa Mianowskiego. 1884. p. 913.
