= Yemelivka =

Rural locality in Ternopil Oblast, Ukraine

Yemelivka Ємелівка
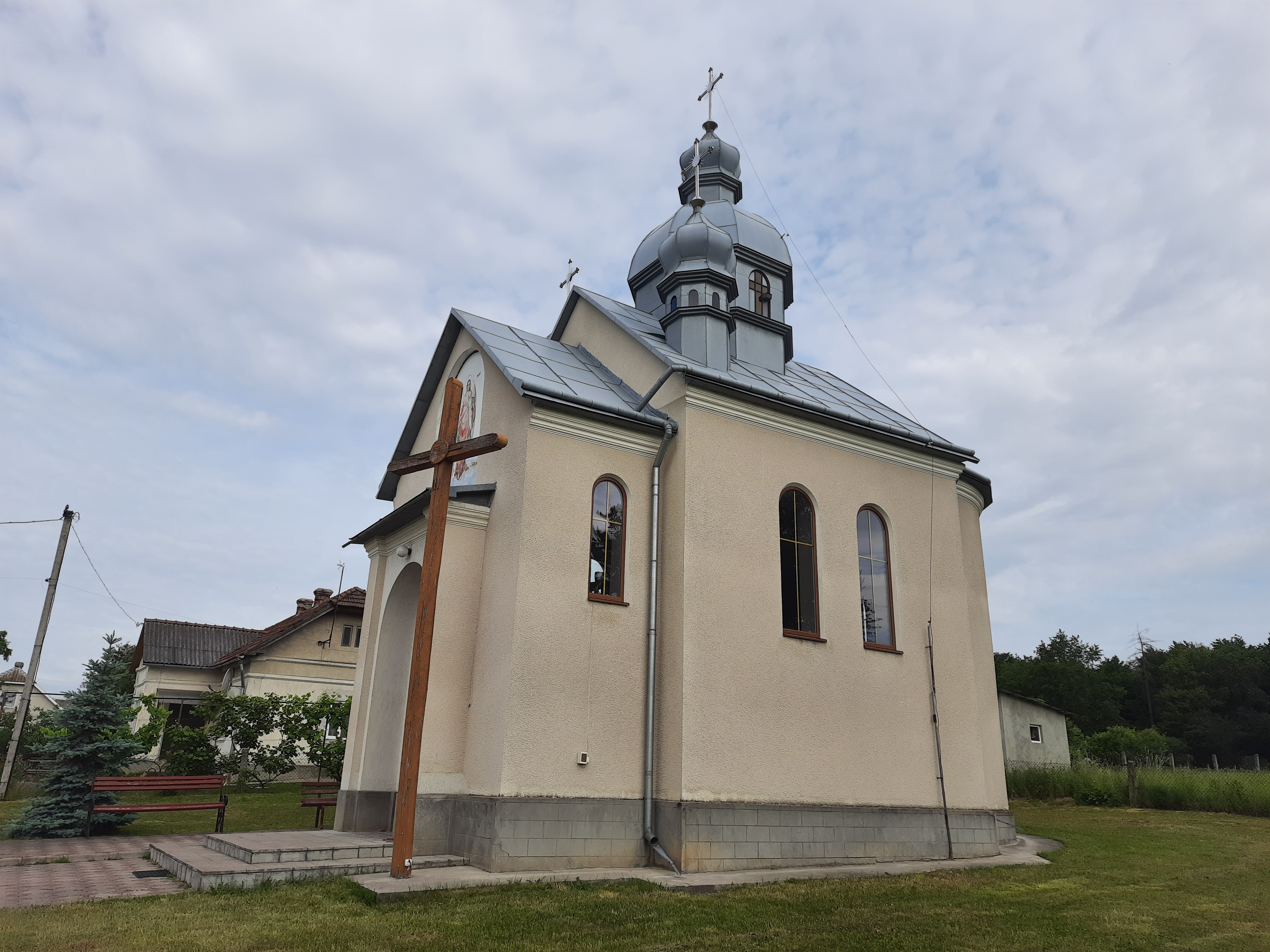
- Saint Michael church

- Location in Ternopil Oblast
- Coordinates: 49°5′49″N 25°51′31″E
- Country: Ukraine
- Oblast: Ternopil Oblast
- Raion: Chortkiv Raion
- Hromada: Kopychyntsi urban hromada
- Time zone: UTC+2 (EET)
  - Summer (DST): UTC+3 (EEST)
- Postal code: 48264

Yemelivka (Ukrainian: Ємелівка) is a village in Kopychyntsi urban hromada, Chortkiv Raion, Ternopil Oblast, Ukraine.

== History ==
Until 19 July 2020, it belonged to the Husiatyn Raion. From 8 December 2020, it has been part of the Kopychyntsi urban hromada.

== Religion ==
- Saint Michael church (1996, brick)
