= Church of the Nativity of the Virgin Mary, Hadynkivtsi =

Greek Catholic church in Hadynkivtsi, Ukraine

Church of the Nativity of the Virgin Mary Церква Різдва Пресвятої Богородиці
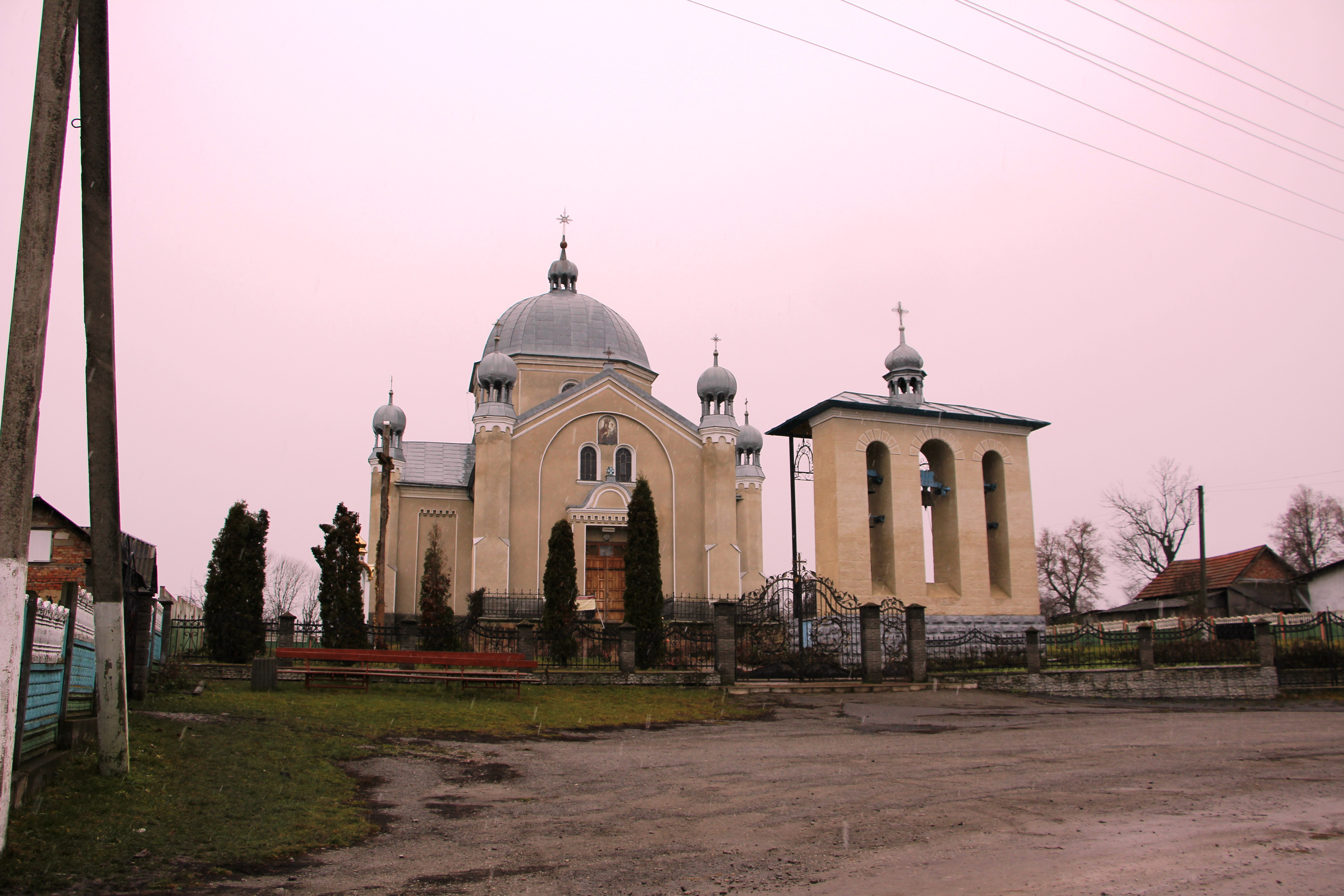

- Location within Ternopil Oblast

Religion
- Affiliation: Ukrainian Greek Catholic Church
- Ecclesiastical or organisational status: Active
- Year consecrated: 2012; 1913
- Status: Church

Location
- Location: Hadynkivtsi, Kopychyntsi urban hromada, Chortkiv Raion, Ternopil Oblast, Ukraine
- Coordinates: 49°02′07″N 25°55′51″E

Architecture
- Type: Church
- Completed: 1913
- Dome: 1

The Church of the Nativity of the Virgin Mary (Ukrainian: Церква Різдва Пресвятої Богородиці) is a Greek Catholic parish church (UGCC) in Hadynkivtsi of the Kopychyntsi urban hromada of the Chortkiv Raion of the Ternopil Oblast.

== History ==
The parish in Hadynkivtsi was first mentioned in the 16th century, and from the 18th century onward, it and its church belonged to the UGCC. The community built a wooden church in the late 17th century, and a new one was constructed in 1718 under the initiative of Fr. Andrii Pashkovskyi. The parish received canonical visitations from Fr. Sylvestr Malskyi (1732–1733) and Fr. Antonii Onufriievych (1758). Later, in 1850, a new wooden rectory was built, and the church was renovated and consecrated in 1860.

In 1909, at the initiative of Fr. Klyment Sonevytskyi, the community, with support from a local nobleman named Tselietskyi, began building a new church. Bishop Hryhoriy Khomyshyn of the Stanyslaviv Eparchy consecrated the completed church on September 21, 1913, and also conducted a visitation.

The parish and church remained Greek Catholic until 1946, after which they were under the ROC until 1990. In 1990, they returned to the fold of the UGCC.

In 1957, the church's interior was painted with murals. A storm damaged the building on 5 July 2000, and in 2009, artist Roman Papinko restored the murals. Bishop Dmytro Hryhorak, CSsR, of the Buchach Eparchy consecrated the renovated church in 2012.

Currently, the parish is home to the Pope's Worldwide Prayer Network brotherhood and the Altar Society. Catechesis is led by the priest. The parish grounds also feature two chapels, a monument to Blessed Bishop Hryhoriy Khomyshyn, and a chapel-church of Saints Peter and Paul on Pidlisna Street. The parish owns a residential and a non-residential building.

== Priests ==
- at. Andrii Pashkovskyi (1717–1736),
- at. Vasyl Slyvatskyi (1736–?),
- at. Stefan Savichevskyi,
- at. Makar Saviczevskyi (1784–1817),
- at. Mykhailo Struminskyi,
- at. Yakiv Shankovskyi,
- at. Ivan Senatovych (1838–1840),
- at. Semen Lukasevych (1840–1842),
- at. Oleksii Navrotskyi (1842–1843),
- at. Fylyp Halinatyi (1843–1844, 1845–1847),
- at. Dmytro Khodorovskyi (1844–1845),
- at. Mykola Chaplinskyi (1847–1848),
- at. Yakiv Horbachevskyi (1848–1850),
- at. Tom Boratynskyi (1850–1855),
- at. Ivan Kornii (1855–1890),
- at. Klyment Sonevytskyi (1891–1928),
- at. Toma Baratynskyi (~ nineteenth century),
- at. Izydor Skorokhid,
- at. Stepan Turchyn,
- at. Pavlo Mykytyn,
- at. Pavlo Onuk,
- at. Hryhorii Petryshyn (1973–1983),
- at. Vasyl Kvik (since 1983).
