= Kopychyntsi urban hromada =

Kopychyntsi Urban Territorial Community in Ternopil Oblast, Ukraine

Kopychyntsi Urban Territorial Community Копичинецька міська територіальна громада
- hromada
- Seal

- Location within Ternopil Oblast Location within Ukraine
- Coordinates: 49°06′29″N 25°54′46″E
- Country: Ukraine
- Oblast: Ternopil Oblast
- Raion: Chortkiv Raion
- Administrative center: Kopychyntsi

Government
  - Head of Kopychyntsi Community: Bohdan Kelichavyi

Area
  - Total: 170.7 km^{2} (65.9 sq mi)

Population (2023)
  - Total: 13,965
- City: 1
- Villages: 11
- Website: kopychynecka-gromada.gov.ua

Kopychyntsi urban territorial hromada (Ukrainian: Копичинецька територіальна громада, romanized: Kopychynetska miska terytorialna hromada) is a hromada in Ukraine, in Chortkiv Raion of Ternopil Oblast. The administrative center is the city of Kopychyntsi. Its population is 13,965.

== History ==
It was formed on 30 July 2018 by the combining of the Kopychyntsi urban and Hadynkivtsi, Maidan, Oryshkivtsi, Sukhostav, Tudoriv, Yabluniv village councils of the now-defunct Husiatyn Raion.

On 8 December 2020, Kotivka village council of the Chortkiv Raion was added to the hromada.

== Settlements ==
The hromada consists of 1 city (Kopychyntsi) and 11 villages:

- Vyhoda
- Hadynkivtsi
- Yemelivka
- Kotivka
- Maidan
- Teklivka
- Oryshkivtsi
- Rudky
- Sukhostav
- Tudoriv
- Yabluniv
