= Kotivka, Ternopil Oblast =

Rural locality in Ternopil Oblast, Ukraine

Kotivka Котівка
- Location in Ternopil Oblast
- Coordinates: 49°4′56″N 25°55′26″E
- Country: Ukraine
- Oblast: Ternopil Oblast
- Raion: Chortkiv Raion
- Hromada: Kopychyntsi urban hromada
- Time zone: UTC+2 (EET)
  - Summer (DST): UTC+3 (EEST)
- Postal code: 48270

Kotivka (Ukrainian: Котівка) is a village in Kopychyntsi urban hromada, Chortkiv Raion, Ternopil Oblast, Ukraine.

== History ==
The first written mention is from 1443.

After the liquidation of the Husiatyn Raion on 19 July 2020, the village became part of the Chortkiv Raion.

== Religion ==
- Church of John the Baptist (1995, brick, UGCC)

== Sources ==
- (in Ukrainian) Гуменна Г., Мельничук, Б., Котівка // Ternopil Encyclopedic Dictionary: in 4 v. / editorial board: H. Yavorskyi and other, Ternopil: "Zbruch", 2005, V. 2: К—О, S. 201–202. — ISBN 966-528-199-2.
