= Vitaliy Bayrak =

Ukrainian Catholic priest (1907–1946)

Blessed Vitaliy Bayrak OSBM
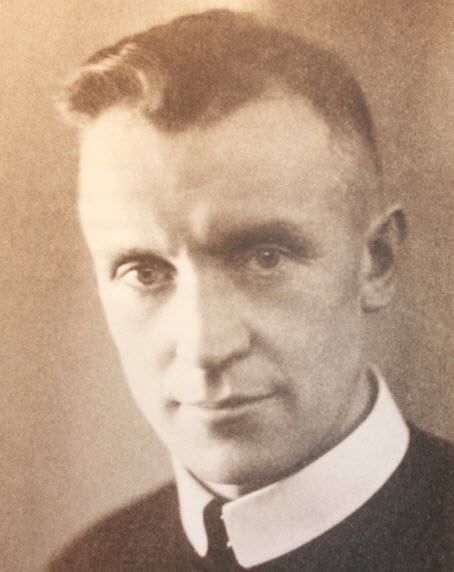
- Born: February 24, 1907; Szwajkowce, Austrian Galicia, Austria-Hungary
- Died: April 21, 1946 (aged 39); Drogobych prison, Ukrainian SSR, Soviet Union (now Drohobych, Ukraine)
- Cause of death: prisoner abuse

Vitaliy Bayrak (Ukrainian: Віталій Байрак), sometimes referred to as Volodomyr Bayrak (Ukrainian: Володоир Байрак; February 24, 1907 – April 21, 1946), was a Ukrainian Catholic priest and martyr.

Born in Szajkowce in Austrian Galicia (now Shvaikivtsi, near Ternopil in modern-day Ukraine), he entered a Basilian monastery in 1924 and was ordained a priest on August 13, 1933. He was appointed superior at the Drohobych monastery in place of Yakym Senkivskyi. Throughout his life, he was considered to be a very active and friendly missionary, who possessed a great gift for giving spiritual direction.

On September 17, 1945, Bayrak was arrested and, on November 13, was sentenced to imprisonment for confiscating property, even though he had none. On Easter 1946, he died a martyr for the faith after having been beaten in the Drohobych prison.
