= Yabluniv, Chortkiv Raion, Ternopil Oblast =

Rural locality in Ternopil Oblast, Ukraine

Yabluniv Яблунів
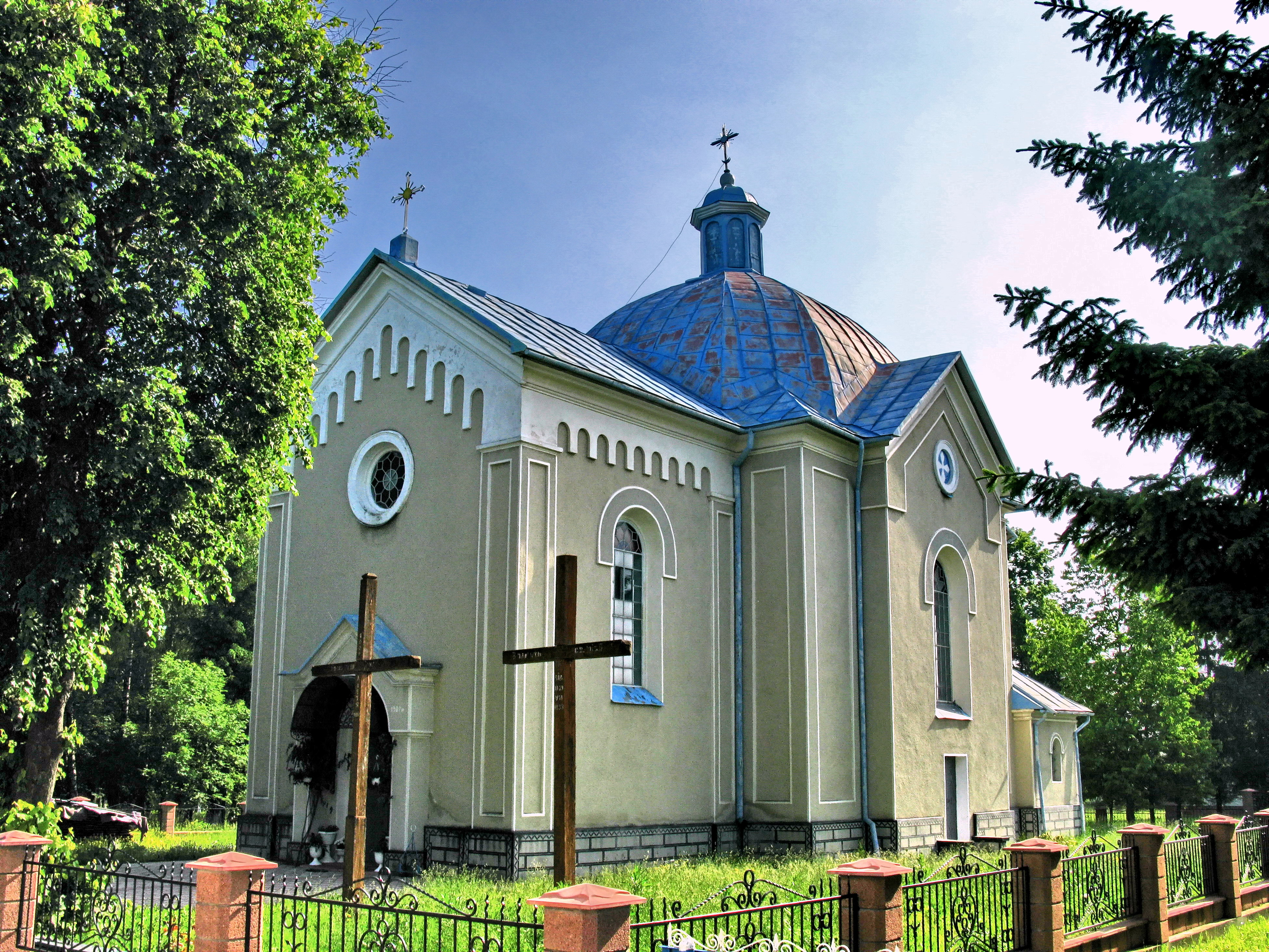
- Church of the Assumption

- Location in Ternopil Oblast
- Coordinates: 49°8′35″N 25°50′42″E
- Country: Ukraine
- Oblast: Ternopil Oblast
- Raion: Chortkiv Raion
- Hromada: Kopychyntsi Hromada
- Time zone: UTC+2 (EET)
  - Summer (DST): UTC+3 (EEST)
- Postal code: 48265

Yabluniv (Ukrainian: Яблунів) is a village in Kopychyntsi urban hromada, Chortkiv Raion, Ternopil Oblast, Ukraine.

== History ==
The first written mention is from 1391, the property of Petro Dobko.

In 1884, Ivan Franko and Volodyslav Fedorovych stayed in the local palace of Czartoryski-Dzieduszycki. The writer studied documents and materials about the Ukrainian patriotic Fedorovych family in the library of the palace of the landowner Czartoryski. In the same village, Ukrainian folklorist and ethnographer Volodymyr Hnatiuk recorded songs.

== Religion ==
There are two churches of the Assumption (1875, brick, OCU; 2008, brick, UGCC) and the Roman Catholic Church of St. Elizabeth.

== Sources ==
- (in Ukrainian) Бандурка І., Уніят В., Щавінський, В., Яблунів // Ternopil Oblast. History of cities and villages: in 3 v. / Ternopil: "Terno-graph", 2014, V. 2: Г—Л, S. 136—138. — ISBN 978-966-457-228-3.
- "Jabłonów (4)". Geographical Dictionary of the Kingdom of Poland (in Polish). 3. Warszawa: Kasa im. Józefa Mianowskiego. 1882. p. 349—350.
