= Vyhoda, Kopychyntsi urban hromada, Chortkiv Raion, Ternopil Oblast =

Rural locality in Ternopil Oblast, Ukraine

Vyhoda Вигода
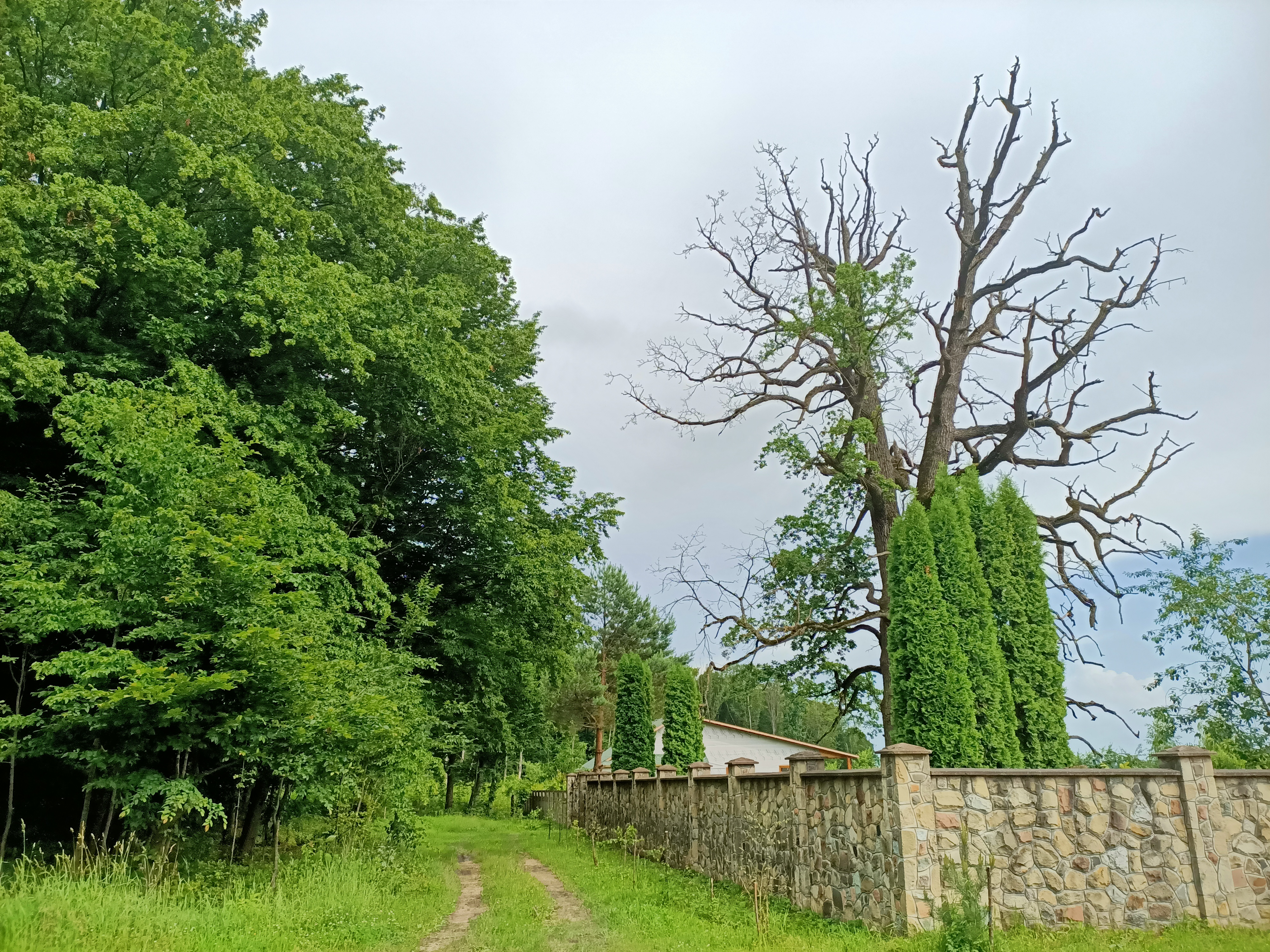
- Oak of Trentovskyi

- Location in Ternopil Oblast
- Coordinates: 49°2′26″N 25°52′12″E
- Country: Ukraine
- Oblast: Ternopil Oblast
- Raion: Chortkiv Raion
- Hromada: Kopychyntsi urban hromada
- Time zone: UTC+2 (EET)
  - Summer (DST): UTC+3 (EEST)
- Postal code: 48273

Vyhoda (Ukrainian: Вигода) is a village in Kopychyntsi urban hromada, Chortkiv Raion, Ternopil Oblast, Ukraine.

== History ==
Known from the 18th century.

After the liquidation of the Husiatyn Raion on 19 July 2020, the village became part of the Chortkiv Raion.

== Religion ==
- Church of the Descent of the Holy Spirit (UGCC)

== Monuments ==
- Oak of Trentovskyi, a botanical natural monument of local importance

== Sources ==
- (in Ukrainian) Лашта, В., Вигода // Ternopil Encyclopedic Dictionary: in 4 v. / editorial board: H. Yavorskyi and other, Ternopil: "Zbruch", 2004, V. 1: А—Й, S. 1. — ISBN 966-528-197-6.
