= Teklivka, Chortkiv Raion, Ternopil Oblast =

Rural locality in Ternopil Oblast, Ukraine

Teklivka Теклівка
- Location in Ternopil Oblast
- Coordinates: 49°3′40″N 25°55′2″E
- Country: Ukraine
- Oblast: Ternopil Oblast
- Raion: Chortkiv Raion
- Hromada: Kopychyntsi urban hromada
- Time zone: UTC+2 (EET)
  - Summer (DST): UTC+3 (EEST)
- Postal code: 48270

Teklivka (Ukrainian: Теклівка) is a village in Kopychyntsi urban hromada, Chortkiv Raion, Ternopil Oblast, Ukraine.

== History ==
The first written mention is from 1856, according to other sources – 1443.

After the liquidation of the Husiatyn Raion on 19 July 2020, the village became part of the Chortkiv Raion.

== Religion ==
- Church of St. Volodymyr (1902, brick),
- Roman Catholic Church (1892).

== Sources ==
- (in Ukrainian) Гуменна Г., Уніят, В., Теклівка // Ternopil Encyclopedic Dictionary: in 4 v. / editorial board: H. Yavorskyi and other, Ternopil: "Zbruch", 2008, V. 3: П—Я, S. 389. — ISBN 978-966-528-279-2.
- "Teklówka". Geographical Dictionary of the Kingdom of Poland (in Polish). 12. Warszawa: Kasa im. Józefa Mianowskiego. 1892. p. 280.
