= Vasyl Slobodian =

Ukrainian architectural historian, local historian (born 1951)

- Василь Михайлович Слободян
- Born: 28 September 1951 (age 74); Lviv (now Ukraine)
- Education: Lviv Polytechnic Institute

Vasyl Slobodian (Ukrainian: Василь Михайлович Слободян; born 28 September 1951) is a Ukrainian architectural historian, local historian.

== Biography ==
Vasyl Slobodian was born on 28 September 1951 in Lviv.

In 1973 he graduated from the Lviv Polytechnic Institute. From 1990 at the Ukrainian Regional Specialized Scientific and Restoration Institute "Ukrzakhidproektrestavratsiia": electronic systems design engineer; compiler and editor-in-chief of the Visnyk of the Institute "Ukrzakhidproektrestavratsiia" (1993–2009); head of the publishing department, now a Leading Researcher.

In 2006, he received his Candidate of Historical Sciences.

He was a representative of Ukraine in the joint commission for the inclusion of Ukrainian wooden churches in the UNESCO World Heritage List. As part of a team of researchers, he developed the historical basis for the reconstruction of the architectural and ethnographic ensemble of the Zaporizhzhia Sich in Khortytsia.

== Works ==
From 1988, he has been conducting historical research, in particular on sacred construction in Ukraine and on its ethnic lands abroad.

Slobodian is the author of more than 120 scientific works on the history of architecture. He has worked on and published biographies of Ukrainian architects Roman Hrytsai, Oleksandr Lushpynskyi, and Vasyl Nahirnyi.

Monographs:

- Tserkvy ukraintsiv Rumunii (1994)
- Kholmshchyna i Pidliashshia (1997, co-author)
- Synahohy Ukrainy (1998)
- Zhovkivshchyna: istoryko-arkhitekturni opysy tserkov (1998)
- Tserkvy Ukrainy: Peremyska yeparkhiia (1998)
- Ukrainski tserkvy Brodivskoho raionu (2000, co-author)
- Tserkvy Turkivskoho raionu (2003)
- Khramy Rohatynshchyny (2004)
- Tserkvy Kholmskoi yeparkhii (2005)
- 100 tserkov Nahirnykh (2 parts, 2013—2015, co-author)
- Istoriia tserkov sela Dobriany (2014)
- Istoriia Ustia Zelenoho ta yoho tserkov (2018)
- Ukrainski dereviani tserkvy v rysunkakh Antona Varyvody (2020)
- Atlas ukrainskykh istorychnykh mist (2020, co-author)

== Awards ==
- Dmytro Yavornytskyi Prize (2010)
