= Hadynkivtsi =

Hadynkivtsi Гадинківці
- Village
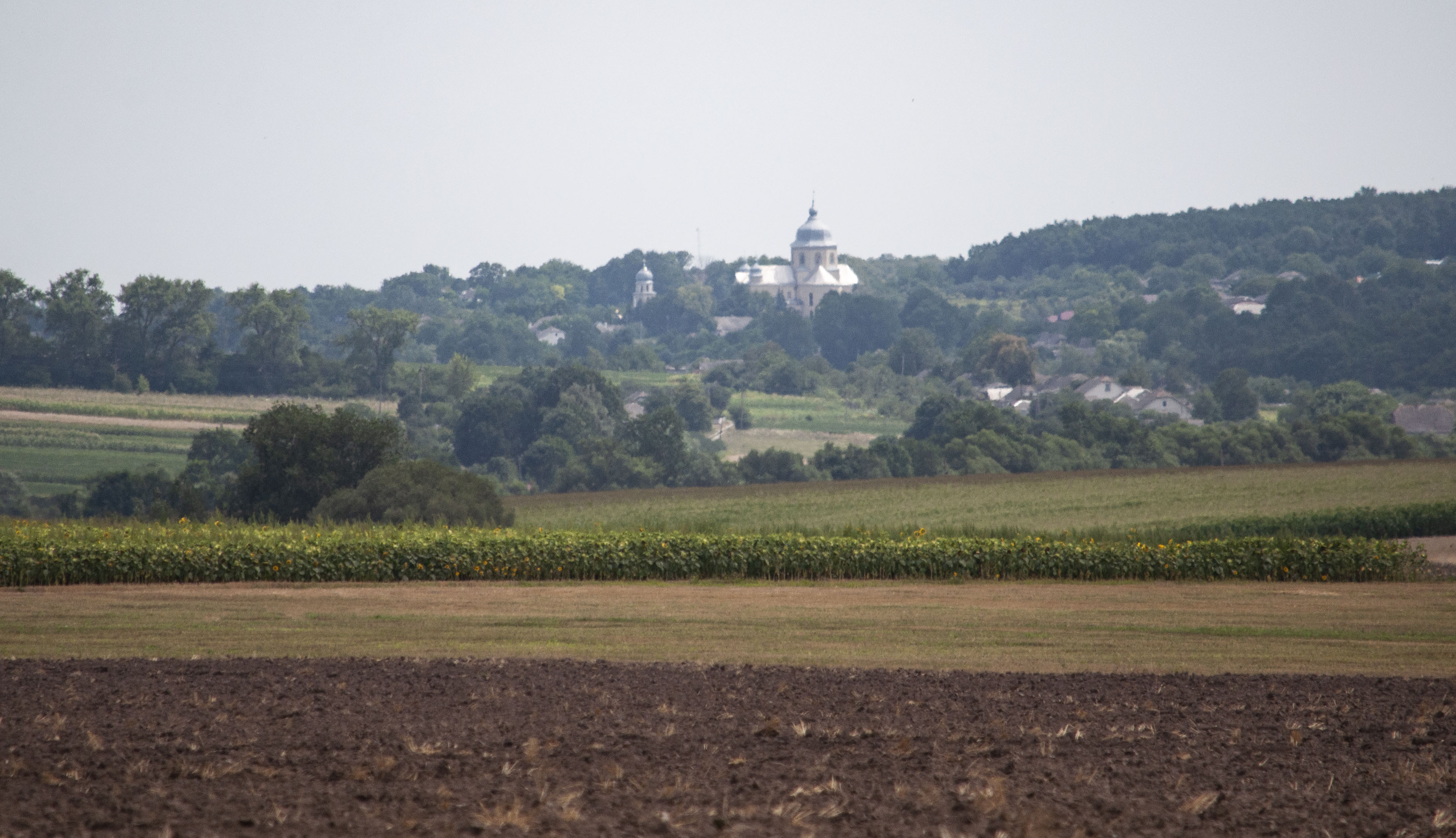
- View of the village

- Location within Ternopil Oblast
- Coordinates: 49°02′20″N 25°55′36″E
- Country: Ukraine
- Oblast: Ternopil Oblast
- District: Chortkiv Raion
- Hromada: Kopychyntsi Hromada
- Established: 1648
- Elevation: 300 m (980 ft)

Population (2014)
  - Total: 1,031
- Time zone: UTC+2 (EET)
  - Summer (DST): UTC+3 (EEST)
- Postal code: 48273
- Area code: +380 3557

Hadynkivtsi (Ukrainian: Гадинківці) is a village located in Chortkiv Raion (district) of Ternopil Oblast (province in western Ukraine). It belongs to Kopychyntsi urban hromada, one of the hromadas of Ukraine.

== History ==
The first written mention of the village dates back to 1491.

Until 18 July 2020, Hadynkivtsi belonged to Husiatyn Raion. The raion was abolished in July 2020 as part of the administrative reform of Ukraine, which reduced the number of raions of Ternopil Oblast to three. The area of Husiatyn Raion was merged into Chortkiv Raion.

Since 30 July 2018, it has been part of the Kopychyntsi urban hromada.

== Religion ==
- Church of the Nativity of the Virgin Mary (1911, restored in 2002, UGCC)
- Chapel of the Sacred Heart of Jesus (1926, now used as a cultural center, RCC)

== People ==
- Hryhoriy Khomyshyn (1867–1947), Ukrainian Greek Catholic bishop and hieromartyr
- Ihor Sonevytsky (1926–2006), Ukrainian-born composer, conductor, pianist and musicologist
