= Sukhostav =

Village in Ternopil Oblast, Ukraine

Sukhostav Сухостав
- Village
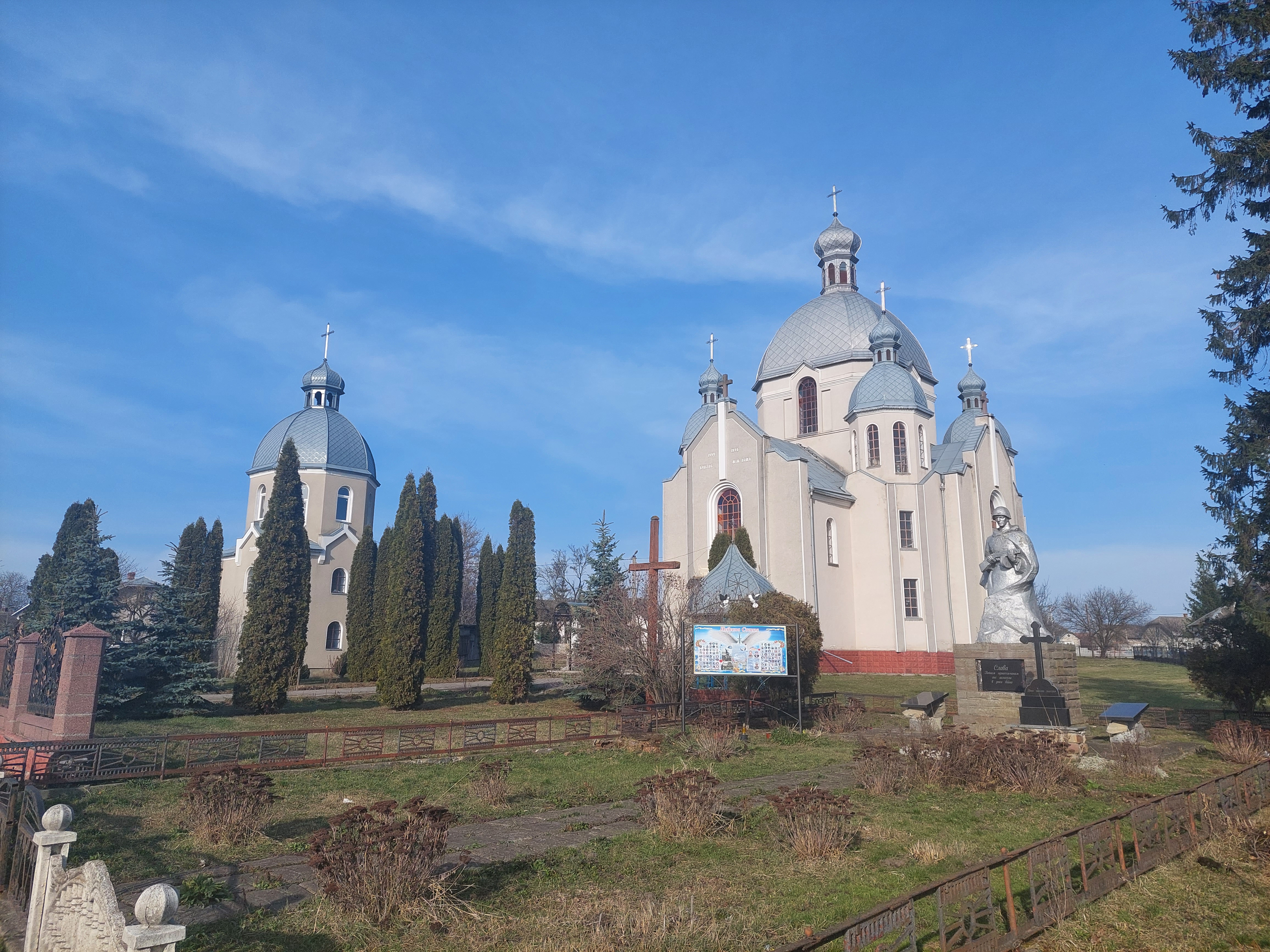

- Location within Ternopil Oblast Location within Ukraine
- Coordinates: 49°09′17″N 25°51′14″E
- Country: Ukraine
- Oblast: Ternopil
- Raion: husiatyn
- Founded: 1553

Population (2025)
  - Total: ▼908

Sukhostav (Ukrainian: Сухостав; Polish: Suchostaw, Yiddish: סעכעסטעוו, romanized: Suchastov) is a village in Husiatyn Raion, Ternopil Oblast, western Ukraine. According to the 2001 Ukrainian census, it has population of 982. It is located by the Nichlava Rivier. It is the administrative center of Sukhostav rural council.

There is a Church of the Nativity of the Theotokos in Sukhostav. ( Media related to Sukhostav at Wikimedia Commons)

== History ==
In 1553 Mikołaj Potocki of King Sigismund II Augustus court obtains a privilege from King to establish a miasteczko (market town) in place of the village of Jablonow. For faster development it was granted the Magdeburg rights and relieved of state taxes for 15 years. Eventually Jablonow remained a village, and the miasteczko named Suchostaw was established nearby. The coat of arms of the place was Pilawa (the owner's) on the blue field, with the golden fish on the bottom (Only fish remained on the current c.o.a.). Over time it changed owners. It was destroyed during the Khmelnytsky Cossack Uprising (1648-1657) and rebuilt again. During the Partitions of Poland it belonged to the Austrian Partition.

=== Jewish history ===
When the miasteczko was restored after the Cossack Uprising, Jewish innkeepers, renters and tradesmen started settling the place. During World War I some 200 Jews emigrated, but some 40 families stayed, engaged in small crafts and peddling.

During World War II the Jewish population was expelled to the nearby town of Khorostkiv and most probably they were exterminated during the Holocaust.
