= Monument of Cathopoul =

Monument in Taganrog, Rostov, Russia

- Памятник Катопули
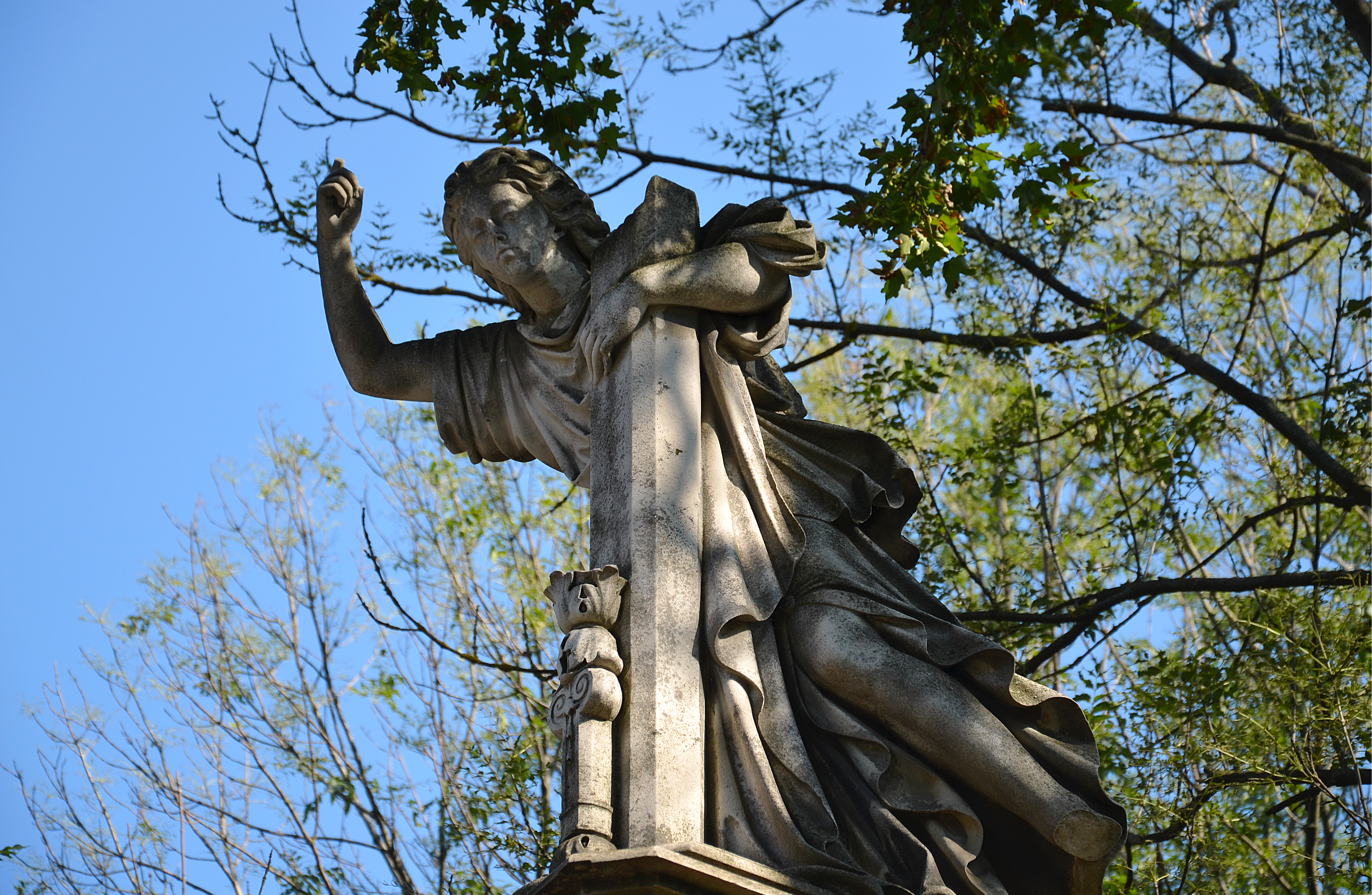
- Interactive map of Monument of Cathopoul
- Location: Taganrog, Old city cemetery
- Coordinates: 47°12′27″N 38°54′12″E
- Completion date: 1872

The Monument of Cathopoul (Russian: Памятник Катопули), is a monument, in the form of an angel with a cross, on the crypt of an Italian merchant of Greek origin, Philip Katopul, in the old city cemetery of Taganrog, Rostov Oblast, Russia.

== Description ==
The monument is located on a crypt with four arches which is supported by angular rustovanny columns. The top part of the central arch (over an entrance) is decorated with medallions, corners of columns – an ornament in the form of plants. All design is spread with a dome with a rectangular turret which is a pedestal for a figure of an angel. The monument of an angel of Grief introduces a sentimentality element in a complex. Crypt height with a monument – about 7 meters. All design is revetted with white marble. The person of an angel of grief is cut very expressively. The angel holds the cross established on a pedestal with a diameter of 30 centimeters.

The monument was built in 1872, it was made in Italy and in parts delivered by sea to Taganrog. So far original state of a complex changed a little: the cross at an angel is destroyed by places, the medallion did not remain, as well as the bulk of facing white marble. The small bas-relief with Jesus Christ's face which was in the center of a cross is placed on other burial near a crypt now. On an entrance to a crypt a heavy iron door over which the inscription remained: "ФИЛИППЪ ДМИТРIЕВИЧЪ КОТОПУЛИ РОДИЛСЯ 23 ДЕКАБРЯ 1814, СКОНЧАЛСЯ 13 IЮЛЯ 1867 ГОДА". Windows of a crypt are blocked.

According to the widespread version, the crypt will be mentioned A.P. Chekhov in the work "Ionych" as a tomb of the Italian opera singer Dimetti. A number of historians say that the surname of Dimetti really belonged to the Italian singer who visited Taganrog on tours, and this sonorous name was used by the author of the story concerning a crypt Kotopuli. There are no reliable historical data.

The monument is an object of cultural heritage of regional value where it is carried according to the decision of Small council of the Rostov regional council of People's Deputies No. 301 of 18 November 1992. It is remarkable that on the official portal of the Government of the Rostov region in the list of objects of regional value the tomb for a long time and appeared: "A monument on a grave of Dimett who is described in the story by A. P. Chekhov "Ionych". Nevertheless in 2016 the error was eliminated, now the name of an object of cultural heritage sounds as "The mausoleum with an angel on burial of F.D. Kotopuli who is described in the story by A. P. Chekhov "Ionych" as "Dimetti's monument".
