= House of Laskin =

- Дом Ласкина
- Interactive map of the House of Laskin area

General information
- Location: 39 Grecheskaya Street, Taganrog
- Coordinates: 47°12′31″N 38°56′30″E

The House of Laskin (Russian: Дом Ласкина) is a building which is located on 39 Grecheskaya Street in the city of Taganrog of the Rostov Oblast. It represents an example of background building of the city which was widespread in the period of the third quarter of the 19th century.

== History and description ==
The ensign Alexander Yakovlevich Laskin arrived in Taganrog in July 1833 together with the construction group for drawing up the estimate and working on improvement of the harbor and Pushkinskaya Embankment. In the 1840s, it was responsible for the construction of Mitrofaniyevsky church where Taganrog Central market is now located. The councilor of state Alexander Laskin was married to Adelaide Laskina who from 1857 (according to other data – since the end of 1860) to 1880 was the owner of the house down on 39 Grecheskaya (Greek) Street in Taganrog. Alexander Laskin directed works on the creation of the horse road which would connect the port and the merchant exchange. In the 1860s, he was a colonel and held a position of the chairman of the case of engineers of means of communication. In the middle of the 1860s he was among the members of the temporary commission who were engaged in the structure of the Taganrog port. He died in 1888, and in 1890 the house was inherited by his son – a collegiate assessor to Gabriel Aleksandrovich Laskin. He owned it until 1898, and was a member of Society of archeology, history, and ethnography which worked at Kazan University. He was engaged in the writing of works which concerned the history of Byzantium.

At the beginning of 1900, the house passed to Nikolay Andreevich Kuznetsov's Cossack captain. In 1911 in the house doctor V. G. Koshevsky worked – receptions lasted from 16:00 to 19:00 - treating people with nervous and sincere diseases. Since 1915 (according to other data – since 1916) the mansion belonged to Fedor Stepanovich Girsanov and his family. They were owners of the house till 1925. Fedor Girsanov took part in the construction of the Taganrog port and was married to the bourgeois Eudoxia Efimovna Glushkova. He let apartments in the house; tenants included port supervisors and the outdoor adviser, the prosecutor Vladimir Vasilyevich Kolpensky. In the same house, the beer bench of Pavel Krisonenko worked. In the 21st century, it is now a private house.

The one-story house is built on a high rise. The corner of the house has the rounded form with six pilasters on a side and main facade. Windows have a rectangular shape with the rounded top. Near windows obnalichnik practically did not remain, but the arc-shaped sandrik on arms are located. Rectangular niches settle down under windows. Diagonally across Grecheskaya Street from the house is Alexander the First Palace.
