= House of Lukin =

- Дом Лукиных
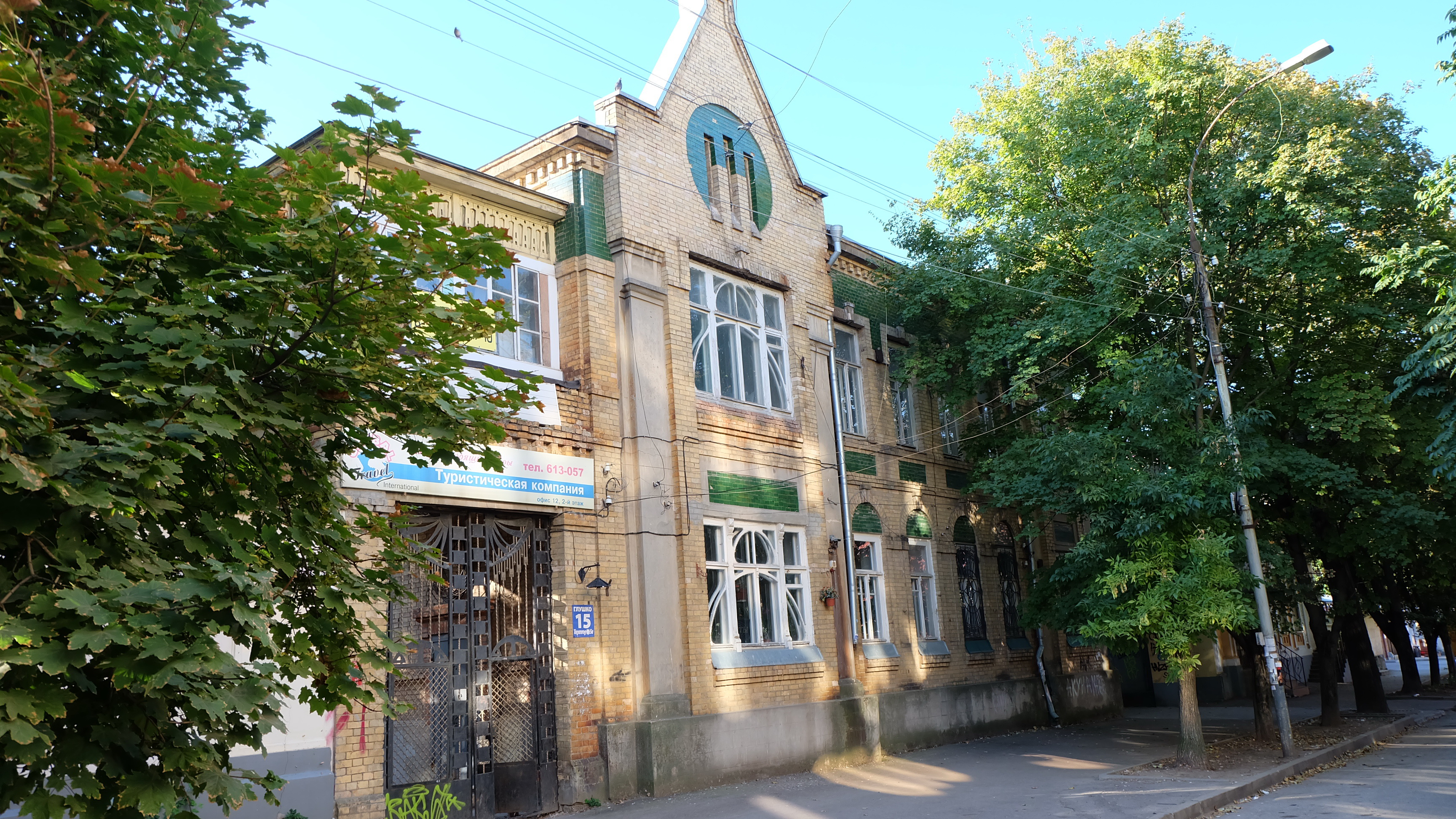
- Location: Taganrog, Anton Glushko Lane, 15
- Coordinates: 47°12′47″N 38°55′38″E
- Opening date: 1910

The House of Lukin (Russian: Дом Лукиных) is a monument of architecture of local value which settles down in Anton Glushko Lane, 15 in the city of Taganrog of the Rostov Oblast.

== History ==
Historical sources demonstrate that the house to the modern address – Anton Glushko Lane, 15, existed in 1827. Then, it is not known for what reasons, it was destroyed and again constructed in the 1910s. At this time the family Lukinykh was owners of the two-storey mansion. According to statistical data, the house was estimated to cost 28 thousand rubles.

Vasily Pavlovich Lukin at the end of the 19th century managed city seaworthy classes and became the author of the book "Navigation" which seamen used as a grant. At the beginning of the 20th century it was registered to vowels of City Duma and was the chairman of the board of Donskoy of land bank. Often on working questions visited St. Petersburg. Died in Kiev in 1919. His wife Sofya Andreevna Lukina in 1908 organized children's kitchen "Milk drop", and in 1914 – opened the city's first kindergarten. At the same time, it worked as the teacher in private initial school of the III category. In family Lukinykh there were several children. The daughter Vera Vasilyevna – in a marriage Ksintaris, was born on 10 August 1892. The son, Konstantin Vasilyevich Lukin, got an education at the St. Petersburg electrotechnical institute, in 1921 he married Evgenia Nikolaevna Grekova. Boris Vasilyevich Lukin was the third child in family.

It is not known when the second stores of the house were constructed, but on 7 November 1918 the announcement was published in one of the Taganrog newspapers that the shoe workshop Freyndelya which settled down on second stores of the house of Lukin was on sale. The house belonged to this family till 1925. During civil war there was a Management on formation of cavalry squadrons of the First Cavalry here, and in 1933 in the house placed exhibits of the city museum. Since 1992 the house has been protected by law as a monument of architecture.

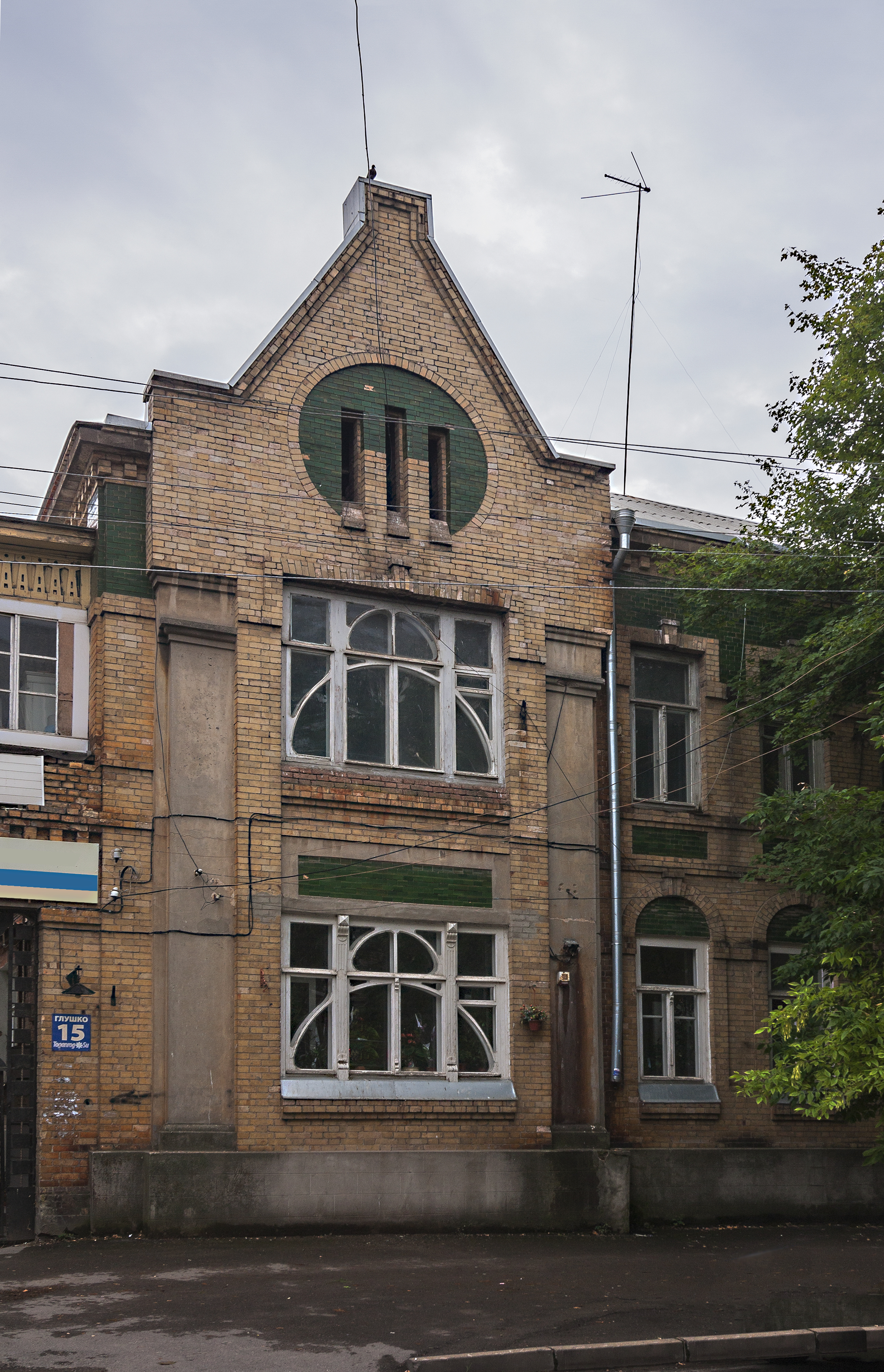

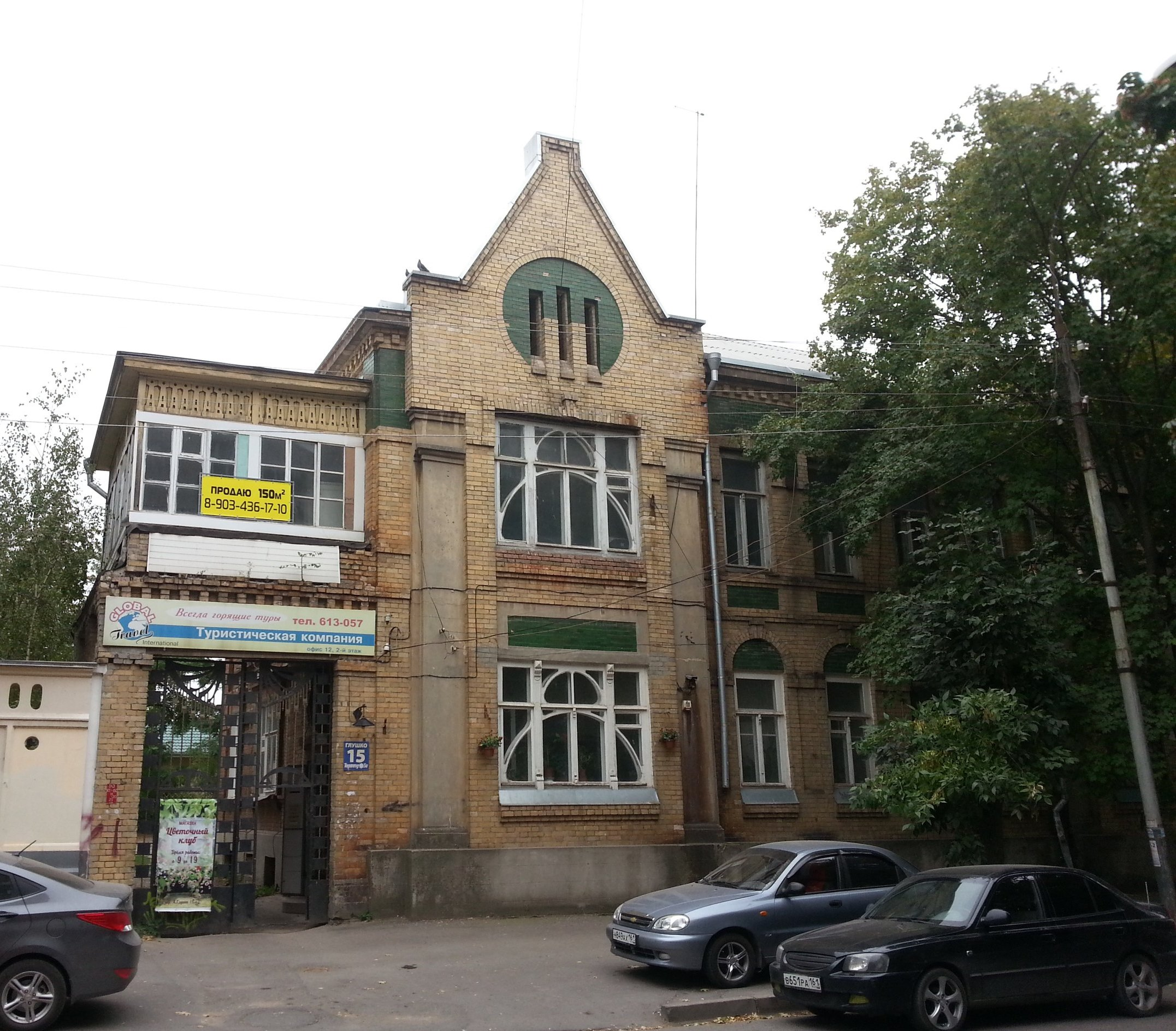

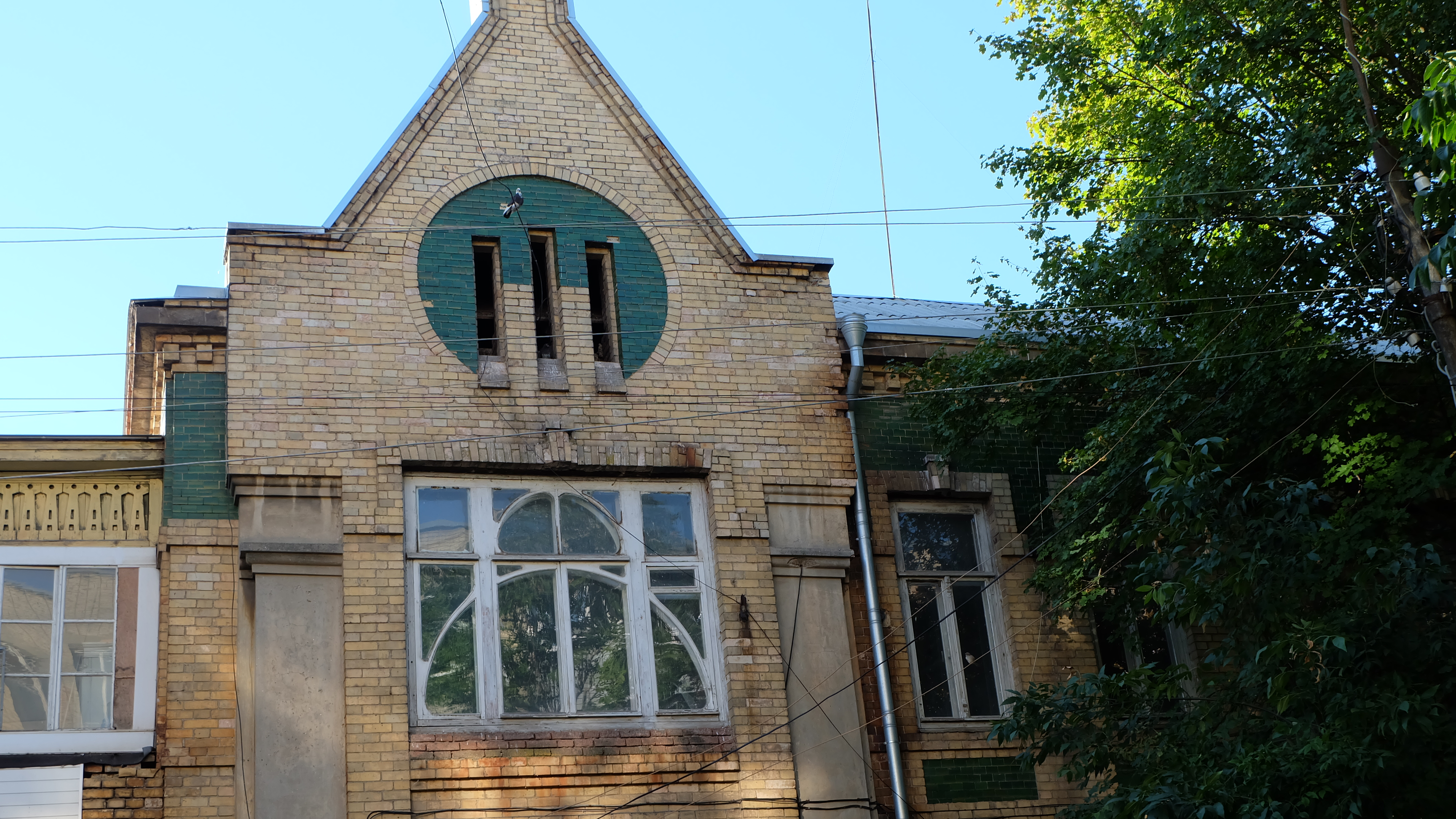

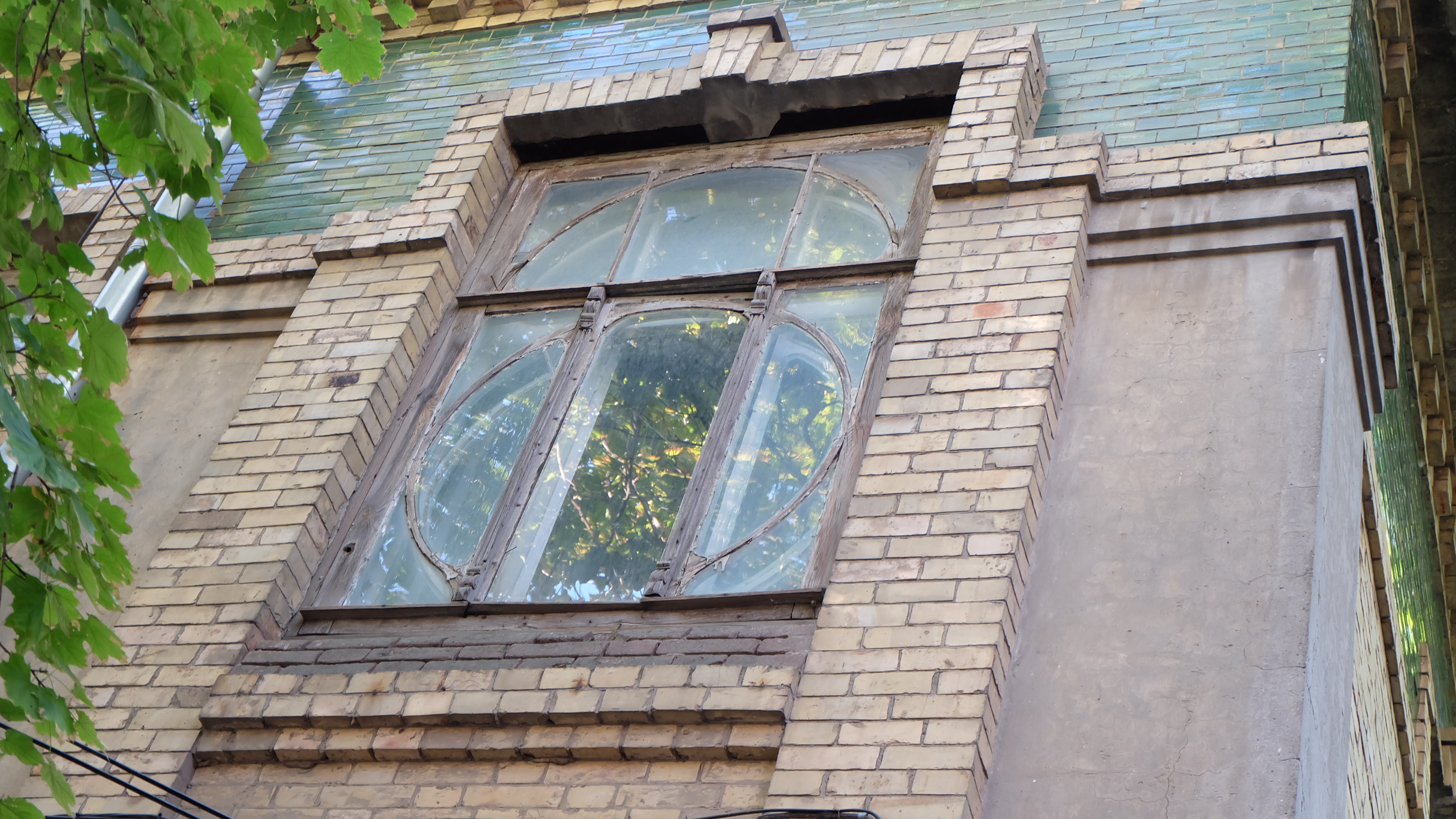
