= House of the merchant Kudrin =

Russia monument of architecture

- Дом купца Кудрина
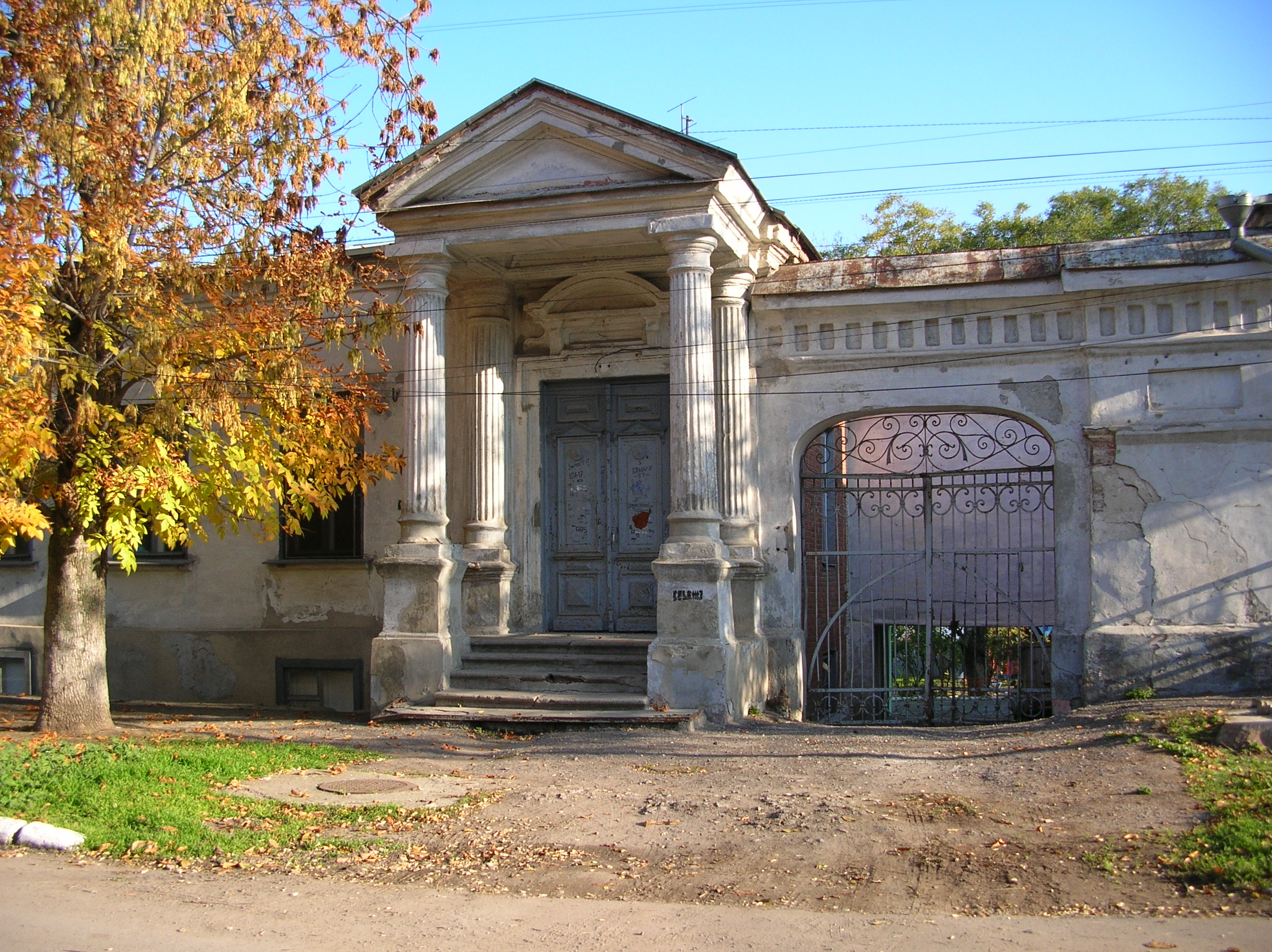
- Interactive map of House of the merchant Kudrin
- Location: Taganrog, Schmidt Street, 10
- Coordinates: 47°12′35″N 38°56′38″E

The House of the merchant Kudrin (Russian: Дом купца Кудрина) is a monument of architecture constructed in the first quarter of the 19th century down the street of Schmidt, 10 in the city of Taganrog of the Rostov Oblast. In the majority of sources it is mentioned as the property of a family of Kudrin, but in some is designated as the real estate of the family of Remy.

== History and description ==
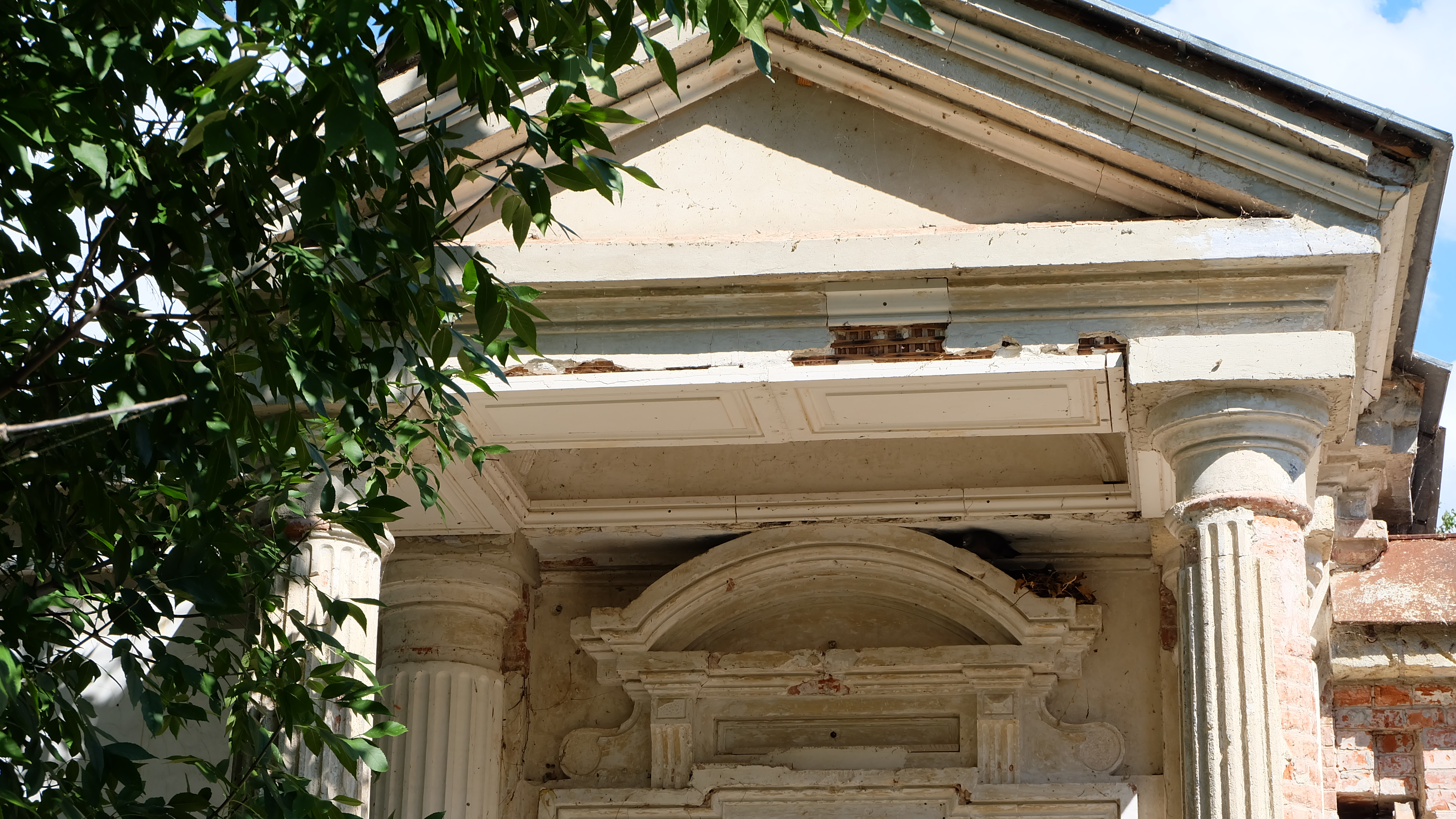

Longtime owners of the house down the street of Schmidt, 10 in Taganrog was Kudrin' family. The house was built in the first quarter of the 19th century by the architect Dupont de Laru. The merchant of the II guild Yakov Kudrin was the owner of the house, his wife called Dominica Avksentyevn. As of 1830, it is known that in a family has raised seven children: 3 boys and 4 girls. After Yakov Kudrin's death at the end of the 1830th years, his son Gabriel began to manage family affairs. The family was engaged in the sale of metal details – hardware. Also in Kudrin' property tree warehouses were registered. Subsequently, Gabriel Kudrin became the representative of merchants in the commercial court. It is known that later time Kudrin' family left the affairs in Taganrog and moved to Kharkiv. But one of Gabriel's brothers – Anton Yakovlevich Kudrin – having got the legal education in Kharkiv, returned to Taganrog. In 1864 it took Ksaveriya Iosifovna Yablunovskaya in the wife. They gave birth to the son Yakov. Anton Yakovlevich Kudrin died in 1901, successors of the house down the street of Schmidt, 10, became Nina Kudrin and Augustine Popov. It is known that in 1910 in the house there lived the director of Commercial school Evgeny Mikhaylovich Garshin.

In 1992 the structure was recognized as a monument of architecture of local value. As of 2003 in the house, the Korablik kindergarten is located.

The house down the street of Schmidt, 10 in Taganrog, represents a one-story structure with the semi-basement room. It was constructed in the style of early classicism. The pediment has the triangular shape, as envisioned by the architect it is supported by 2 columns and 2 semi-columns which are created in the simplified Ionic-Corinthian style. On a trunk of a column vertical trenches – flutes are made. The entrance door is decorated with eaves of the small size with a beam pediment. Registration of a facade could be divided into three parts conditionally earlier. The central part is allocated with semi-columns with the molding located from above. Side parts of a facade of the building are framed with paired semi-columns and rectangular windows. The semi-basement floor contains windows and niches. After a reorganization of the building, some architectural details and elements were lost.
