= House of Skizerl =

- Дом Скизерли
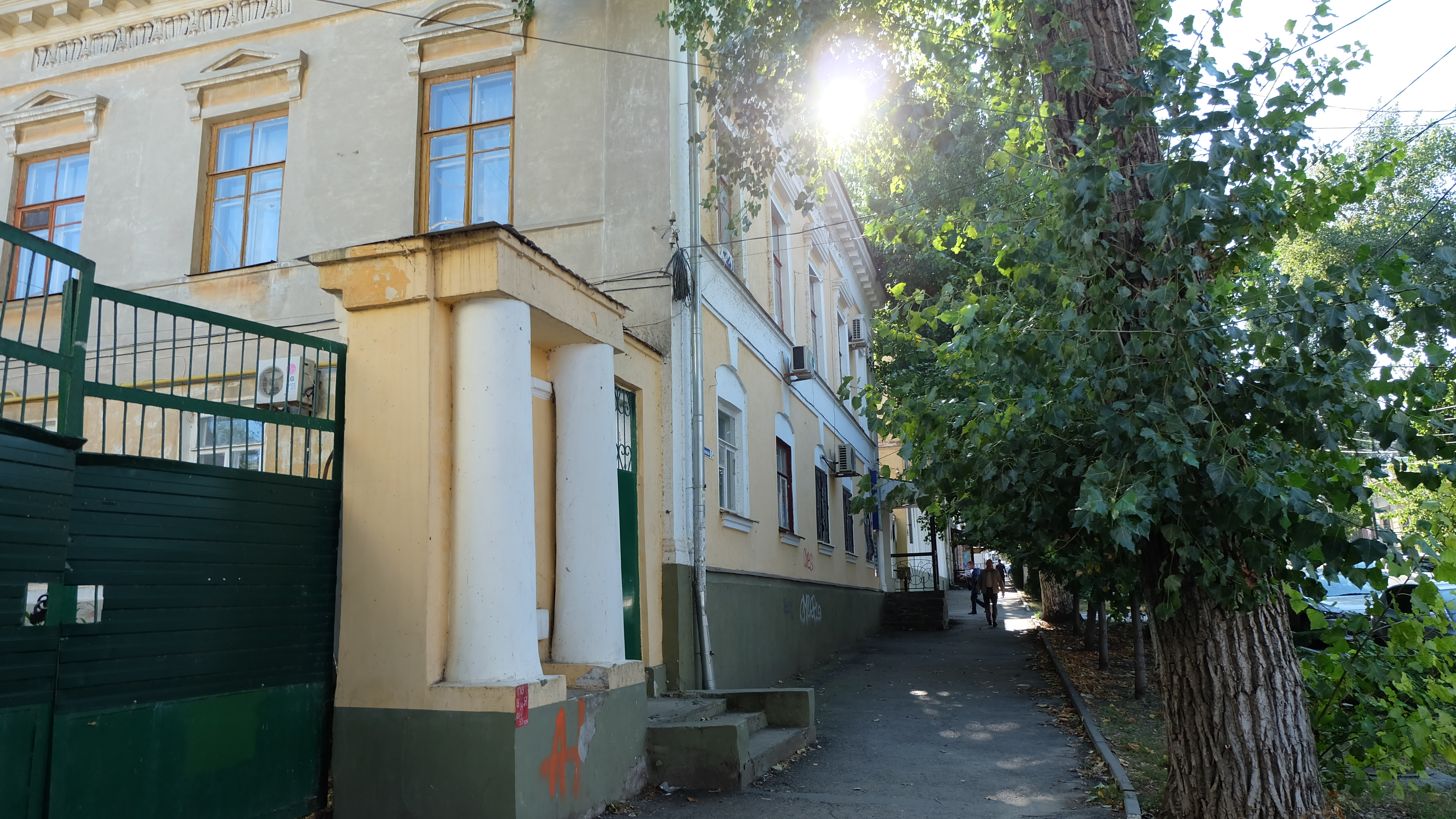
- Interactive map of House of Skizerl
- Location: Taganrog, 3 Turgenevsky Lane
- Coordinates: 47°12′44″N 38°56′12″E

The House of Skizerl (Russian: Дом Скизерли) is a monument of architecture, history and culture at 3 Turgenevsky Lane in Taganrog, Rostov Oblast.

== History ==
In the 1840s, a new two-storeyed house designed by Patriko was built. A part of the domestic constructions which were to this address appeared as a household of family of Palasov. In the 1860s the mansion became the property of the widow of the titular counselor Nadezhda Ivkova. At the end of the 19th century the house changed the owner again: the personal honorary citizen of Taganrog Vasily Vlasovich Skizerli became him. Some part of rooms of the house of Skizerli was allocated for needs of the Russian Society of insurance and transportation klady. The cost of the building was estimated at 12 thousand rubles. The house was owned by Skizerli's family before the 1920s. Since 1992 the house is recognized as a monument of architecture and is protected by the law.

== Description ==
The two-storeyed house was built on a stone base. On a roof a parapet was established. The facade of the house decorated the developed crowning eaves under which the frieze from modelled akantovy leaves settled down. Sandriki in the form of luchkovy and triangular frontonchik and panels settled down over windows. The stone arch towered over a gate, gate were decorated with semi-columns.
