= Mansion of Handrin =

- Особняк Хандрина
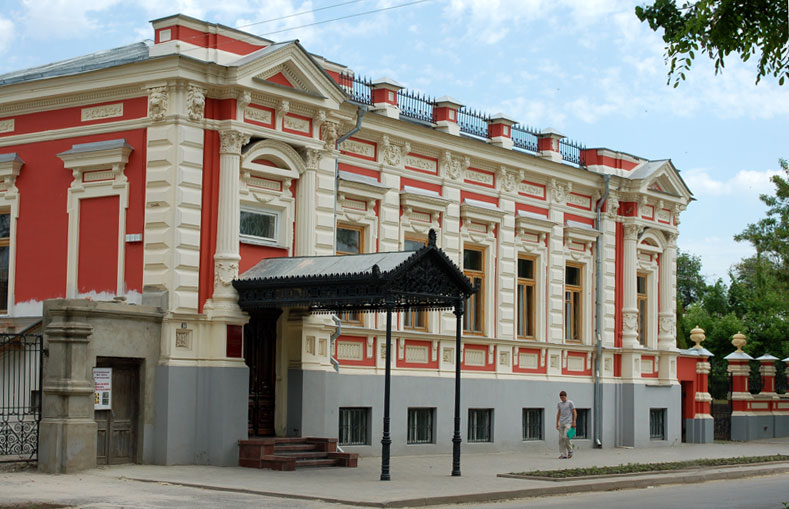
- Interactive map of Mansion of Handrin
- Location: Taganrog, Aleksandrovskaya St., 56

The Mansion of Handrin (Russian: Особняк Хандрина) is a mansion in Taganrog located at 56 Aleksandrovskaya Street, a monument of architecture of the 1870s.

== History and description ==
Handren's mansion was built by request of the honorary citizen of the city of Taganrog, the businessman A. E. Handrin in 1870 on the project architect Tenishev. According to "The inventory and a real estate appraisal of property" from 1873 for 1916 only family representatives Handrinykh is registered as owners of the house: since 1898 — the titular counselor A. Z. Handrin. Before the October Revolution, the family Handrinykh went to Kharkiv.

After the revolution in the building was used as a city military commandant's office. In 1920 the building was transferred to a gorkomkhoz. The noble coat of arms and a sculpture was removed from a facade. In the building, the children's receiver for homeless children, music school settled down. After carrying out restoration works in 1976 in the former mansion of Handrin was opened as an art gallery.

Polutoraetazhny building. The facade is sated with an expressive decor. At the general art composition, there are elements of classicism, baroque and the Renaissance. Capitals of the Corinthian warrant, a column with flutes, a pediment crowned sculptural groups (are lost). Over the main entrance, there was a noble coat of arms of the sort Handrick. The internal interior of the building differed in a rich decorative molding. It was supplemented by chandeliers, tile fireplaces, parquet floors, oak doors. To the yard, there was a wooden verandah with carved columns. There was an orchard. Even the building of the coach maker which remained up to now differed in original architecture.
