= Telegraph House (Taganrog) =

- Телеграфный дом (Russian)
- The Telegraph House in 2016.

- Location within Russia
- Type: house
- Location: str.Grecheskaya 88, Taganrog, Rostov oblast Russia

History
- Built: 1859

Site notes
- Owner: Argyria Skurich

Telegraph House (Russian: Телеграфный дом) is a two-story building in the city of Taganrog, Rostov region. It is The object of cultural heritage of regional importance (Decision No. 301 of 18.11.92.). At the end of the 19th century in the building was a telegraph station.

== History ==
The two-story building of the Telegraph House was built in 1859 at the expense of the Greek merchant of the second guild, Argyria Skurich. It is located along Grecheskaya Street 88.

Upon completion of the construction, the building was rented to accommodate equipment of the first Taganrog telegraph station. The station was opened on 13 January 1860 and operated on the Berdyansk-Mariupol-Taganrog-Rostov-on-Don line.

The merchant class of the city was interested in the telegraph, as it allowed to accelerate the conclusion of trade transactions and receipt of goods. In 1859, a community of Taganrog merchants wrote: "... The increasing development of trade in the port cities of the Azov Sea, with every passing year, has shown an extremely tangible need for communication by means of electric communications between these ports and Odessa, Kharkov, Moscow and St. Petersburg, and even more with major trade cities and ports of Western Europe. What about costs for this item are concerned, they are very soon and easily and even abundantly covered with incomes from charging fees for telegraphic dispatches "

From the 1870s to the 1880s, the building was sold to Colonel Alexander Gavrilovich Remi. Until the beginning of the 20th century, his sons Alexander and Vladimir and their families owned the house. A few years later the building was purchased by the wife of an official Anna Petrovna Fedorova. At the end of the 19th century, the house was moved to the 39-year-old widow Anna Petrovna Ivashchenko.

The last owner of the house was Aba Iosifovich Nesvezhinsky. Under the Soviet regime and until 1925 the building belonged to the merchant of leather goods in the New Bazaar, P.M Stul, after it was nationalized. In 1918, under the German occupation of Taganrog, the building housed a food committee and a city labor exchange. At present it is an apartment house.
