= House of Lakiyer =

House of classical architectural design

- Дом Лакиера
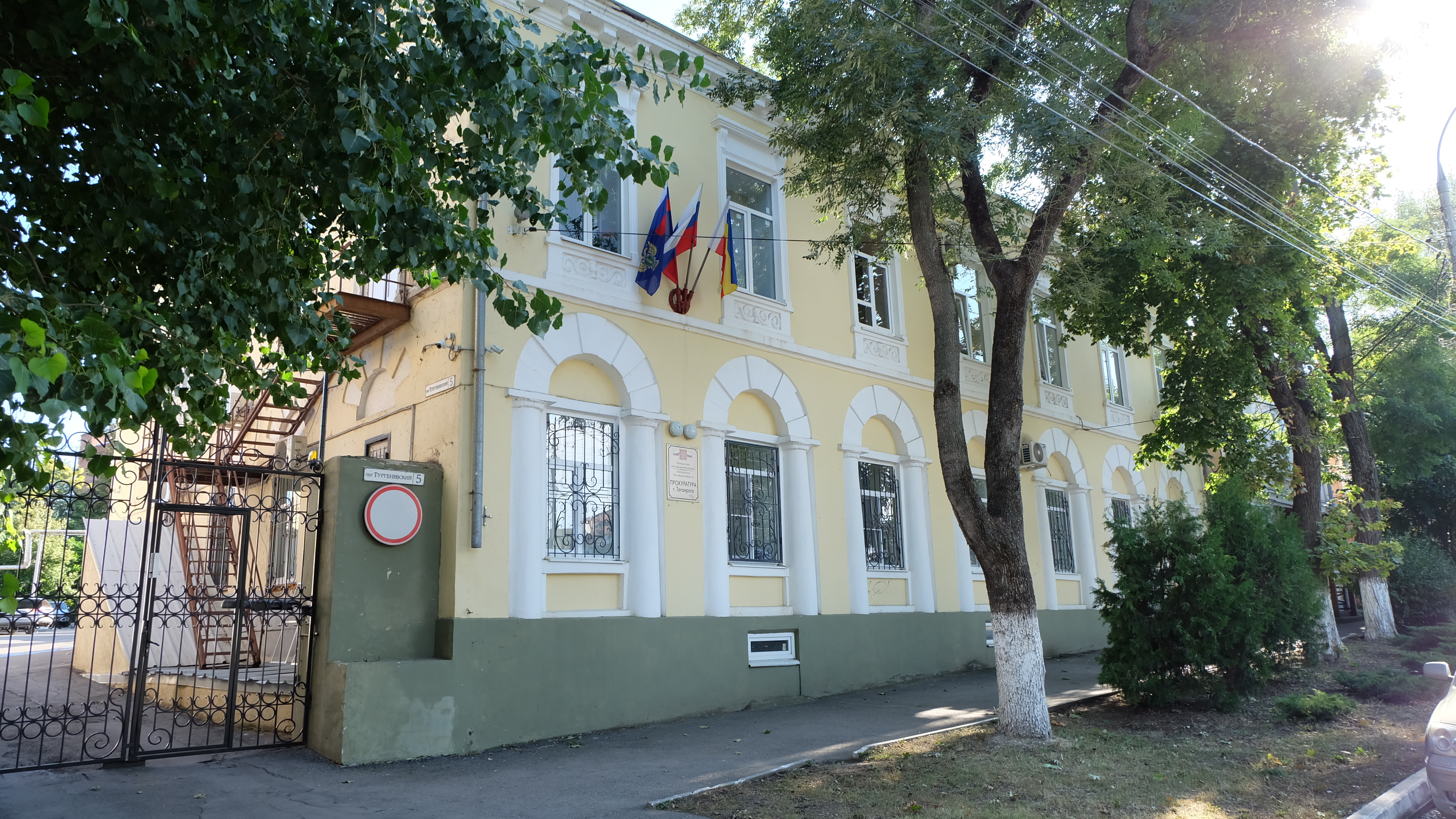
- Interactive map of House of Lakiyer
- Location: Taganrog, Turgenevsky Lane, 5
- Coordinates: 47°12′44″N 38°56′12″E

The House of Lakiyer (Russian: Дом Лакиера) is a monument of architecture of the first half of the 19th century which locates at the address Turgenevsky Lane, 5 in the city of Taganrog of the Rostov Oblast. The house is built in the style of classicism, his facade is decorated by semi-columns.

== History ==
In the first half of the 19th century in Turgenevsky Lane, 5, in Taganrog, the new two-storeyed mansion was built. It towered over one-storey structures — benches which were owned by the merchant of the I guild Karp Markovic Gayrabetov from Nakhchivan who besides was a hereditary honorary citizen. In 1839 the house belonged Greek to the merchant Manuel Kumani. In the 1860s the house changed the owner, the collegiate adviser Mark Varvatsi became the new owner. In 1882 the household carried over his successors — Aleksandra Popudova and Elena Layer. They owned the house till 1920th years and the beginning of the Soviet power, also in their property there was a house down the street Greek, 42. According to estimated data, at this time the cost of the house was equal 24 thousand rubles. In the same house the apartment for needs of a workshop and reception of the order for tailoring of a ladies' and children's dress was rented by madam Fay. On other sources, "the fashionable workshop" was placed in the house since 1892 and it belonged I. Yu. Finish. Since 1992 the house — the architecture monument, is protected by the law. As of 2003, in the house, the Toporek kindergarten is located.
