= House of Lobanov =

- Дом Лобанова (Russian)
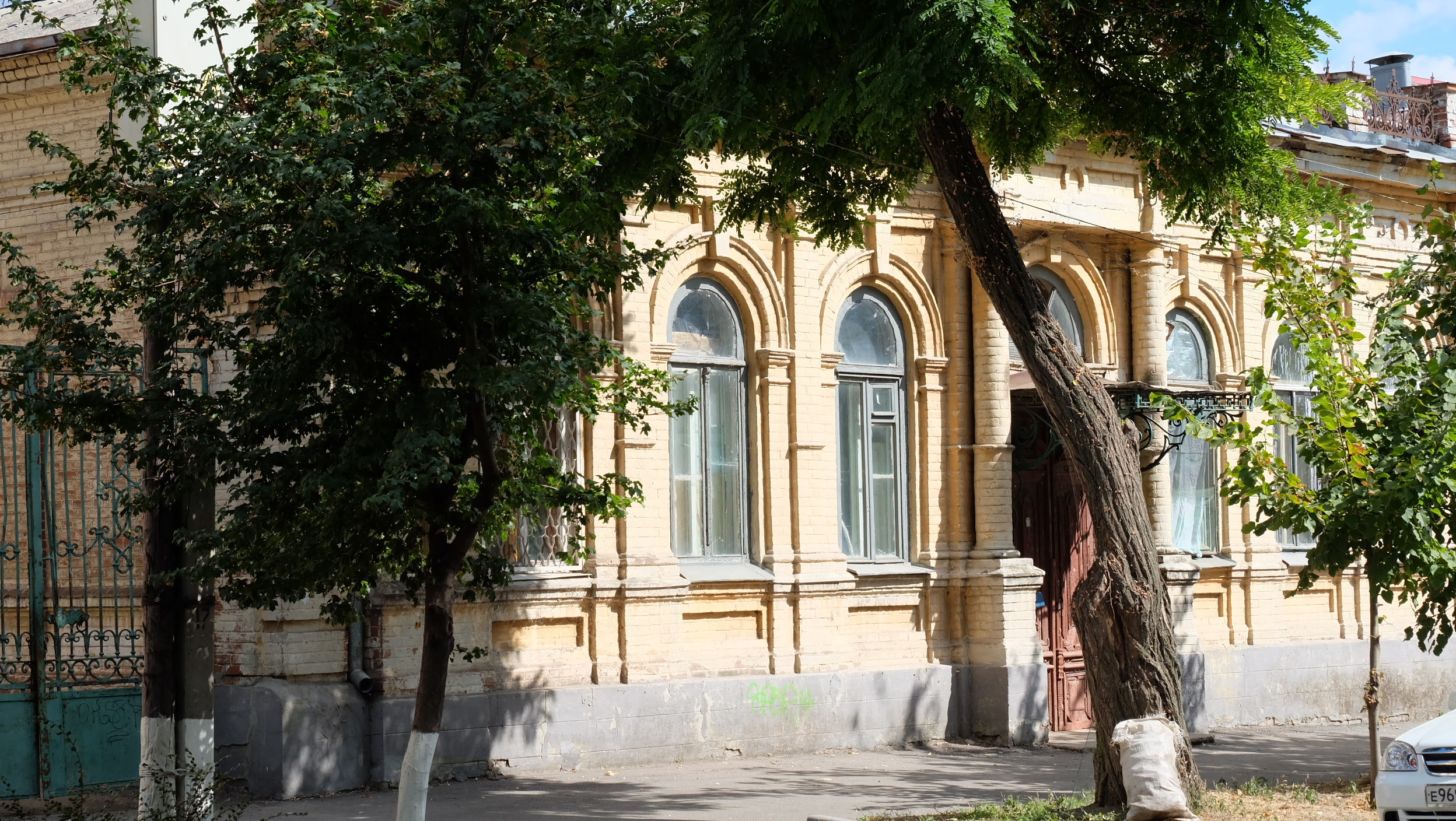
- The house which was built by the petty bourgeois Lobanov
- Interactive map of the House of Lobanov area

General information
- Location: Taganrog, Grecheskaya Street, 32
- Coordinates: 47°12′31″N 38°56′34″E
- Completed: 1897

The House of Lobanov (Russian: Дом Лобанова) is a monument of architecture of local value down the street Greek, 32 in the city of Taganrog of the Rostov Oblast.

== History and description ==
The petty bourgeois Matvei Yakovlevich Lobanov in 1897 built the one-storey house down the street Greek, 32. As of 1906, the house still was in its property. According to one data, in 1910, on others – in 1915, the mansion became Natalya Dmitriyevna Shchuchkina's property. Her husband – the doctor and the councilor of state Ivan Pavlovich Shchuchkin since the beginning of the 20th century was a medical officer in Taganrog. The family raised three children. The only son – Pavel – was built in a rank of horunzhy. At thirty-year age he was killed in battle in East Prussia, his father Ivan Pavlovich, at the beginning of February 1915 reached the field of battle and delivered the son's body to Taganrog. In 1921 in the house down the street Greek, 32 there was a shelter No. 10. Since 1992 the house was given the status of a monument of architecture, it is protected by the law.

The facade of the house can be divided into three parts conditionally. Over side parts figured pediments are located. To the left of the house shod gate with a gate were constructed. In the yard of the house the small tower with a balcony is built on. The porch is located on the center. On a facade several rounded windows are visible, the structure is decorated by semi-columns.
