= House of Subsovich =

Historic building in Taganrog, Russia

- Дом Сабсовича
- Interactive map of House of Subsovich
- Location: Taganrog, Petrovskaya street, 134
- Coordinates: 47°13′25″N 38°55′02″E

The House of Subsovich (Russian: Дом Сабсовича) is an historic building in Taganrog, Russia. The house was named after its first owners.

== History ==
The House of Subsovich was originally built by a merchant of the II guild named Todros Markovic Sabsovich. The house began around a branch line which conducted to the port, and it debouched on the even side of Petrovskaya Street, near the modern Vokzalny Lane. The corner house with a semi-basement was constructed in the 1960s.

A one-story barn was built of brick, and a one-story wing. The wing was remade into two houses, located at the addresses Dzerzhinsky Lane 7 and 9. The present house at Petrovsky, 134 was built by the merchant Woolf Dorofeevich Sabsovich in 1873.

From 1874 to 1879, merchants Woolf, Iosif and the son of the merchant Yakov Sabsovich were the owners. From 1890 to 1898, the structure carried over the merchant Dmitry Egorovich Manusi and the wife of the petite bourgeois Hang Sabsovich.

In 1906 the merchant, an ambarshchik and the landowner Veniamin Iosifovich Sabsovich and the petite bourgeois Hang Sabcuovich's wife appeared as owners of the house. Veniamin Sabsovich was Iosif Dorofeevich's son and was a member of the exchange committee. In 1915 Veniamin Sabsovich continued to own the house together with other owners — the petite bourgeois Isaak Berkovich Ipkov, to Moznaim and Alexey Andreevicham Garshfeldam.
