= House of Voroshilkin =

- Дом Ворошилкина (Russian)
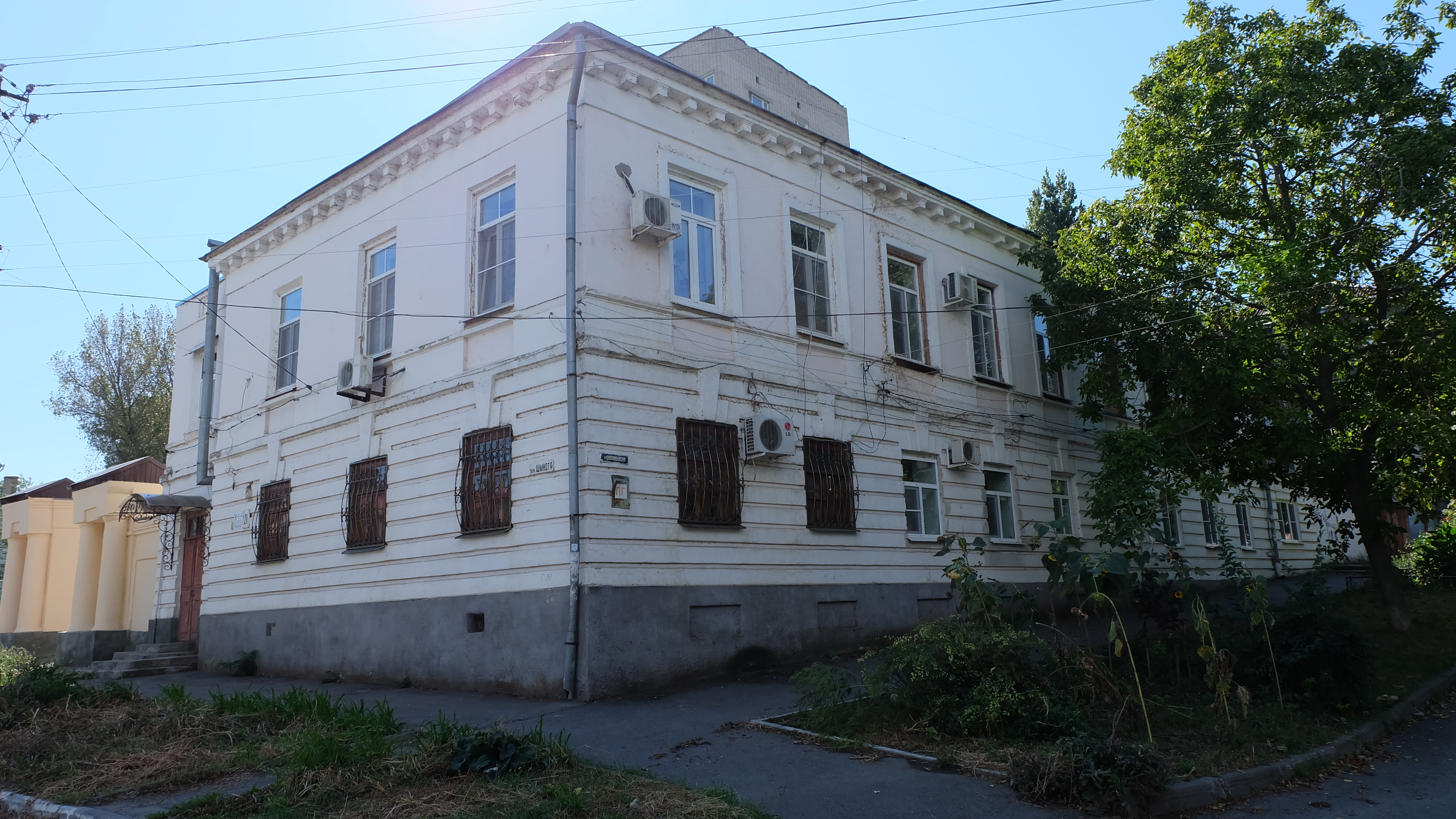
- Monument of architecture of the first half of the 19th century
- Interactive map of the House of Voroshilkin area

General information
- Location: Taganrog, 21 Schmidt Street
- Coordinates: 47°12′39″N 38°56′31″E
- Completed: 1830

The House of Voroshilkin (Russian: Дом Ворошилкина) is an object of cultural heritage of regional value which is a monument of architecture of the first half of the 19th century at 21 Schmidt St in Taganrog, Rostov region.

== History and description ==
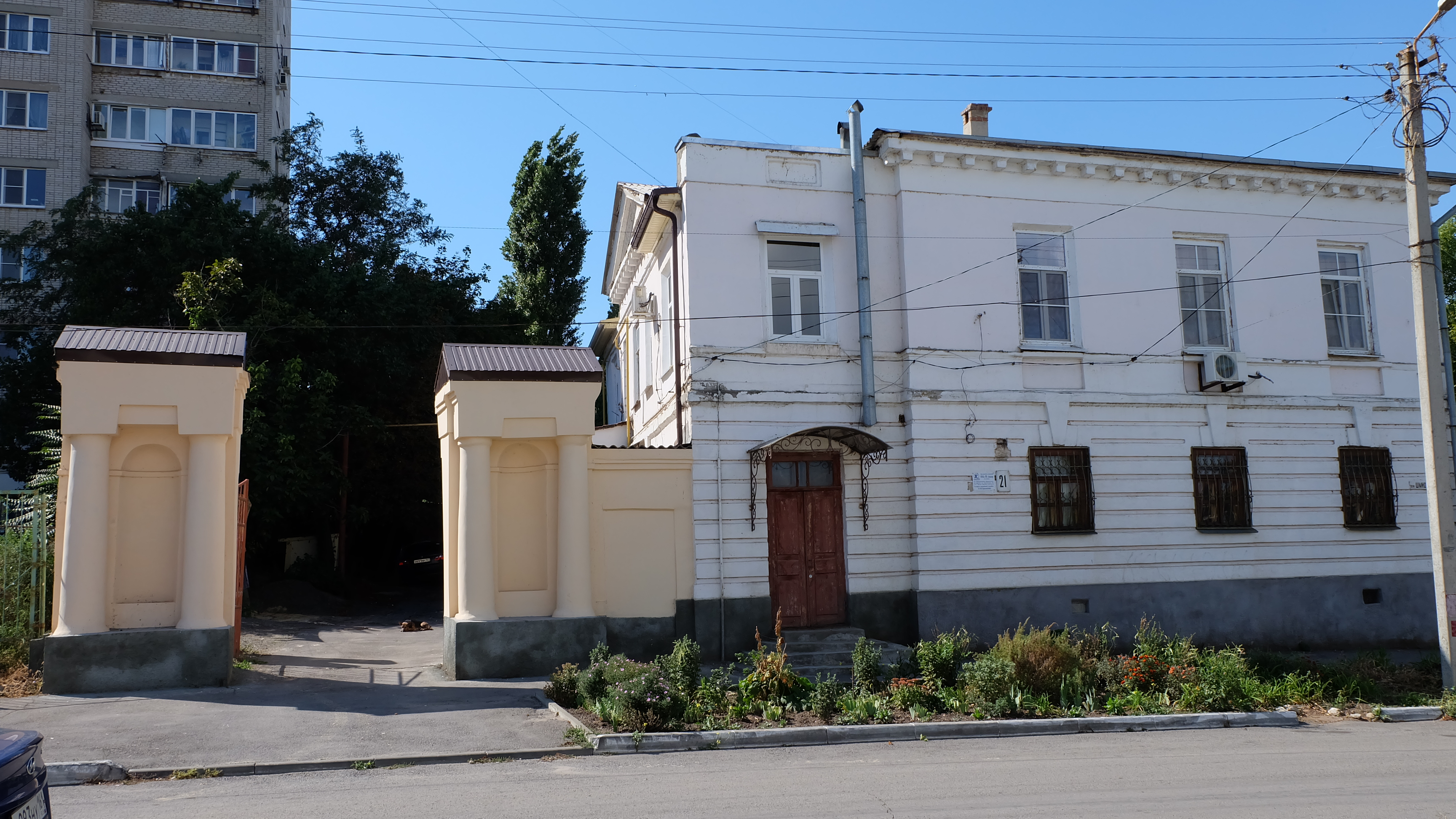
From former constructions gate with semi-columns remained

In 1830 down the street is Schmidt, 21 in Taganrog the merchant of the II guild Timofey Mikhaylovich Voroshilkin built the two-storeyed mansion. It is known that on January 1, 1874, it founded "Association of the factory industry in Taganrog". The mansion down the street of Schmidt was the property of successors of the merchant up to 1915. Then there the gymnasium Yanovich which subsequently became Labour school No. 1 began to be placed. In 1992 an object is taken under the state protection in connection with the recognition of its monument of architecture.

The house is built in style of early bezorderny Russian provincial classicism. Windows are created in the style of eclecticism – characteristic features are the gate with the arc-shaped arch and semi-columns which are placed on both sides of gates. Rusta spaces of the first floor are located in the winter window. Under windows capstones – laying elements are placed. Croutons decorate the crowning eaves. In the territory of the house of the merchant, the remains of the former construction – stone gate with the allocated semi-columns remained.
