= Taganrog Priboy plant =

Coordinates: 47°14′42″N 38°53′20″E

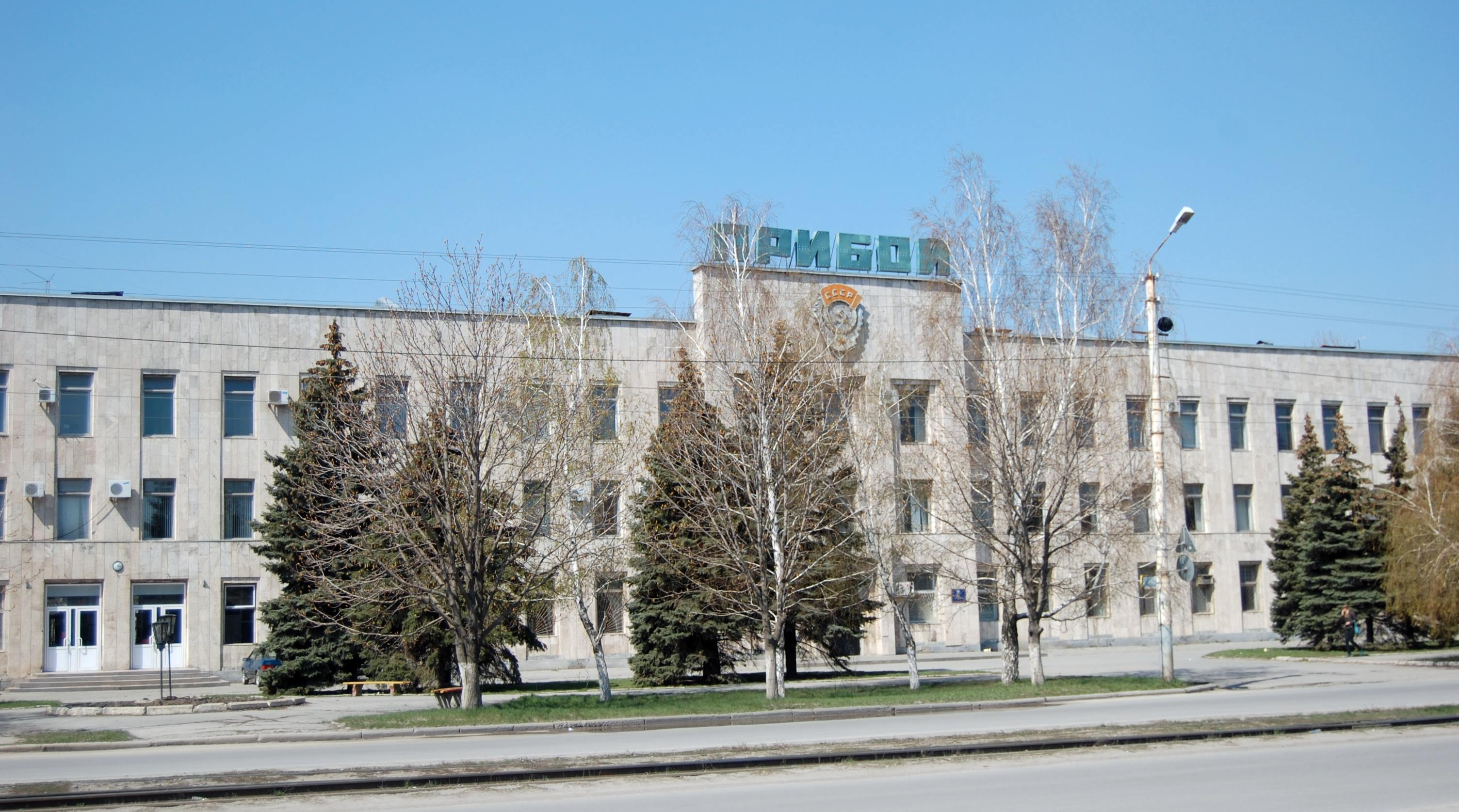
Priboy Taganrog

Taganrog Priboy Plant (Russian: Таганрогский завод „Прибой“) is a company based in Taganrog, Russia incorporated in 2005.

A leading military sonar equipment producer, the Priboy Plant also produces electronic equipment for civilian use, as well as general consumer goods.

In 2023, the company was listed by Switzerland and the United States as a Sanctioned Entity. As of 2026, the sanction is still in place.
