= Memorable sign Barrier =

- Памятный знак «Шлагбаум»
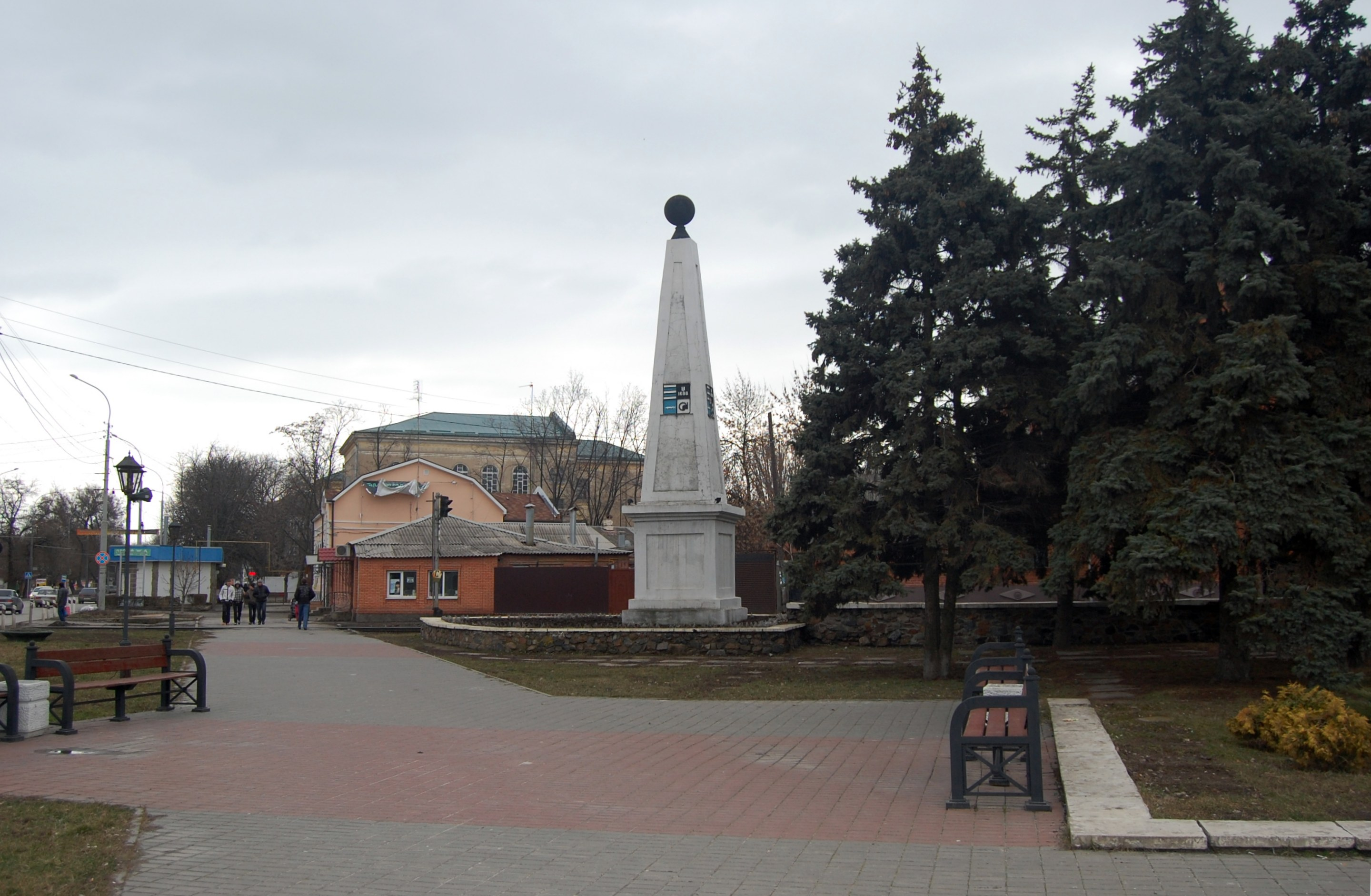
- Interactive map of Memorable sign Barrier
- Location: Taganrog, Petrovskaya Street
- Beginning date: 1963
- Completion date: 1967

The Memorable sign "Barrier" (Russian: Памятный знак «Шлагбаум») is a stele in Taganrog symbolizing the border of the old city.

== History ==
At the beginning of the 1770s, during a revival of Taganrog, on that place where many steppe roads conducting in Troitsk fortress met the guard box and a small barrier was put. Soldiers observed for passing, and later also collecting a tax on road construction with everyone loaded supplies was made here. Near a city barrier so-called Vjezdnaya Square was formed.

The stone city barrier was constructed in honor of a victory over Napoleon and is open for a review on September 27, 1814. The barrier at the same time meant city line which passed on this place until the end of the 19th century.

It was the rare model of engineering art executed in the style of early classicism. The author of the project is unknown. On both sides of the road there were two identical columns: in the basis — a massive stone square curbstone, on it the high tetrahedral pyramid put from a brick, plastered and whitewashed terminating in the huge copper sphere topped with a symbol of the Russian state — a two-headed eagle. On a front part of each pyramid, the municipal coat of arms granted to Taganrog in 1808 by the emperor Alexander I was fixed.

In hundred years the city authorities made capital repair of obelisks: spheres and two-headed eagles, the crowning pyramids, removed and anew applied gilding, stone columns and the bases upon which they were based, plastered cement mortar.

In the Soviet period, in 1920, all heraldry was removed from columns of a barrier.

Two styles of a barrier continued to stand till 1969. Under a pretext that they hinder traffic, on October 19, 1969 steles were destroyed at night.

In October 1974 at the corner of Petrovskaya Street and Dzerzhinsky Street the reconstructed square was open. In memory of a city barrier, the reduced copy of one stele was constructed. The project on the remained photos was executed by the architect E. E. Bronzova. Many enterprises of Ordzhonikidzevsky district of Taganrog took part in the device of the square and its registration. Production of the metal sphere crowning a stele was entrusted to the defensive plant "Red Hydropress".

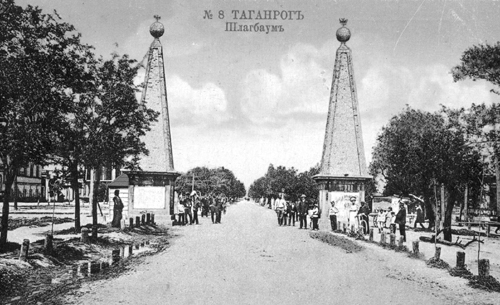
Barrier. the 1900s.
