= House of Lakiyerov =

- Дом Лакиерова
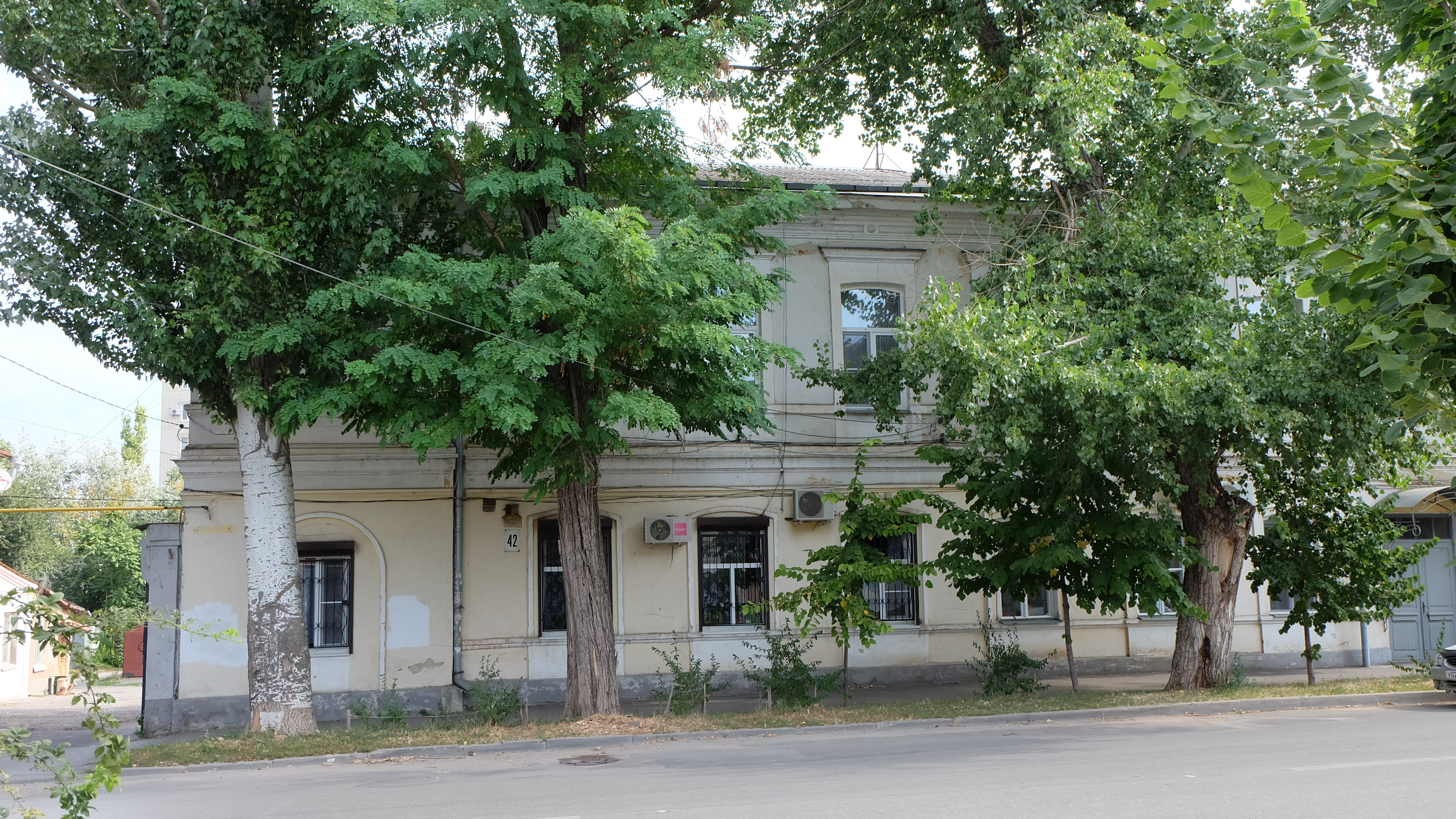
- Location: Taganrog, Grecheskaya Street, 42
- Coordinates: 47°12′35″N 38°56′28″E

The House of Lakiyerov (Russian: Дом Лакиерова) is a monument history and architecture which settles down the street Greek, 42 in the city of Taganrog of the Rostov Oblast.

== History and description ==
At the beginning of the 19th century, this house built in brick style was Ivan Andreevich Varvatsi's property. It is known that when Alexander I visited Taganrog, on this site there were wooden stables for his horses. They were constructed for means of the city. In the same territory, leyb-guardsmen of the Cossack regiment at court accommodated.

The life story of several famous Taganrog families is connected with this household.

In the second half of the 19th century, the house was the property of the collegiate adviser, leader of the nobility of the Rostov County Mark Nikolaevich Varvatsi (according to other data — Varvaki). In 1836 he married the daughter of the titular counselor Sofia Dmitriyevna Alferaki. In Varvatsi's family, there were two daughters: Alexander and Elena. Alexander married the court Greek king Popudov, and Elena became Alexander Borisovich Lakiyer's wife — the author of "The Russian heraldry". The book appeared in 1854, and her author for this work was conferred the Demidovsky award.

According to statistical data, for January 1, 1860, the house occupied the space of 903 square sazhens.

Alexander Lakiyer died in 1870, and his wife Elena in 1915. In Alexander and Elena Lakiyerov's marriage was born five children: sons Mark, Ivan, and daughters Sofia, Alexander and Elena (according to another version — Maria).

In 1910 in this house it was placed artel of Salvador, in 1918 — barracks of the group of the Red Army. In the 1920s in the domestic territory work of Galvanoelement factory was adjusted. Presently it is a house which since 1992 is protected by the law as a monument of architecture of the house.

The two-storeyed house which facade is decorated by Sandvik and a modeled ornament. It was initially constructed in brick style, in 1872 it was reconstructed in style of bezorderny classicism.
