= House of Averino =

- Дом Аверьино (Russian)
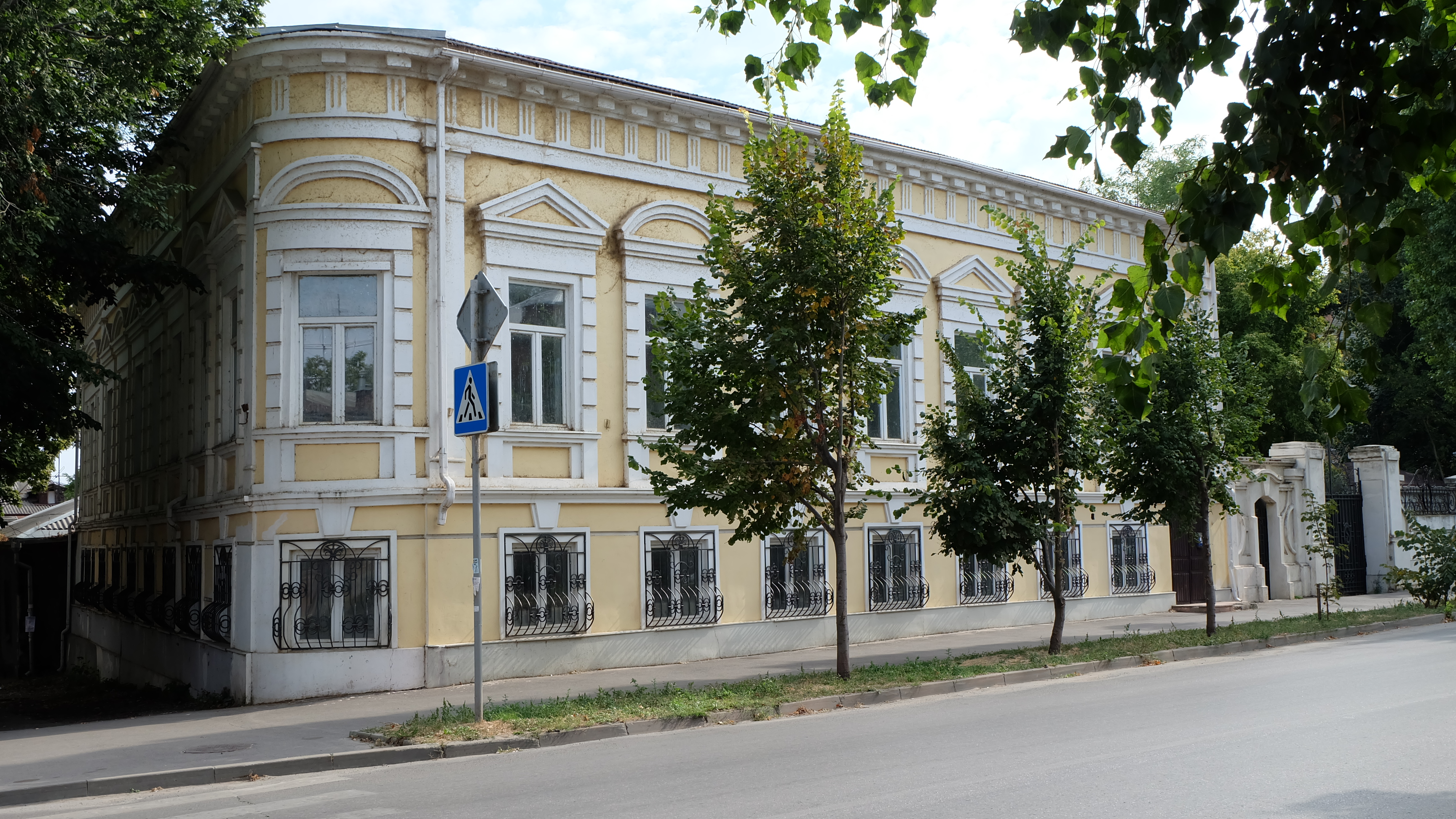
- Interactive map of the House of Averino area

General information
- Location: Taganrog, Grecheskaya St., 50, Rostov Oblast, Russia
- Coordinates: 47°12′39″N 38°56′21″E
- Completed: 1860

The House of Averino (Russian: Дом Аверьино) is a mansion of the middle of the 19th century in the historic center of Taganrog located at the address by Grecheskaya Street, 50. As a part of a historical building of Grecheskaya Street Averyino's house is included in the list of objects of cultural heritage of regional value.

== History and description ==
The ground at the corner of Kommerchesky Lane (nowadays — Ukrainian lane) and Grecheskaya Street at the beginning of the 19th century entirely belonged to a family of businessmen Avelino In the territory, there were several structures. The oldest construction is the two-storeyed house with a balustrade of construction of 1818 (Ukrainian, 7). Subsequently, the household was sold out in parts, and this mansion passed to Missouri's family. The two-storeyed corner house (Greek, 50/11) was constructed in the first half of the 19th century. In 1855 it seriously suffered as a result of artillery fire at the city of the Anglo-French squadron. As a result, owner of the building had to reconstruct it. The household belonged to the merchant A. N. Avelino, and since 1890 after the death of the head of a family — to his wife Sofya Avelino In 1896 the household passed to A. G. Ridel and his successors. In 1915 the mansion was got by the owner of shipping company F. K. Zvorono.

In 1919 in the building there was a rate of the Supreme Commander of White army of the South of Russia of the lieutenant general A. I. Denikin. On October 23 in Averyino's house reception of important military ranks of the Russian army and also representatives of military missions of allies was organized (Great Britain, Czechoslovakia, Poland). With the establishment of the Soviet power, the building was nationalized. In the 1920s in the mansion the city department of national education worked, the seven-year school for children of the German interventionists, then orphanage No. 8 was placed. From 1944 to 1948 the second floor of the building occupied the House of pioneers and school students, and the children's music school No. 1 of P. I. Tchaikovsky worked at the first floor. It occupied this building till 2000.

The architecture of the house of Avelino combines the elements inherent in classicism and baroque. A quite strict facade is decorated with a Rustock. Sandri of rectangular windows alternate luchkovy and triangular forms. The eaves from mutual on all perimeter crown a platband. From the yard, there is a balcony with openwork metal protections supported by four columns.

== Literature ==
- Тимошенко, В. И. (2003). Энциклопедия Таганрога. Ростов-на-Дону: РостИздат.
