= House of Sirotinykh =

- Дом Сиротиных (Russian)
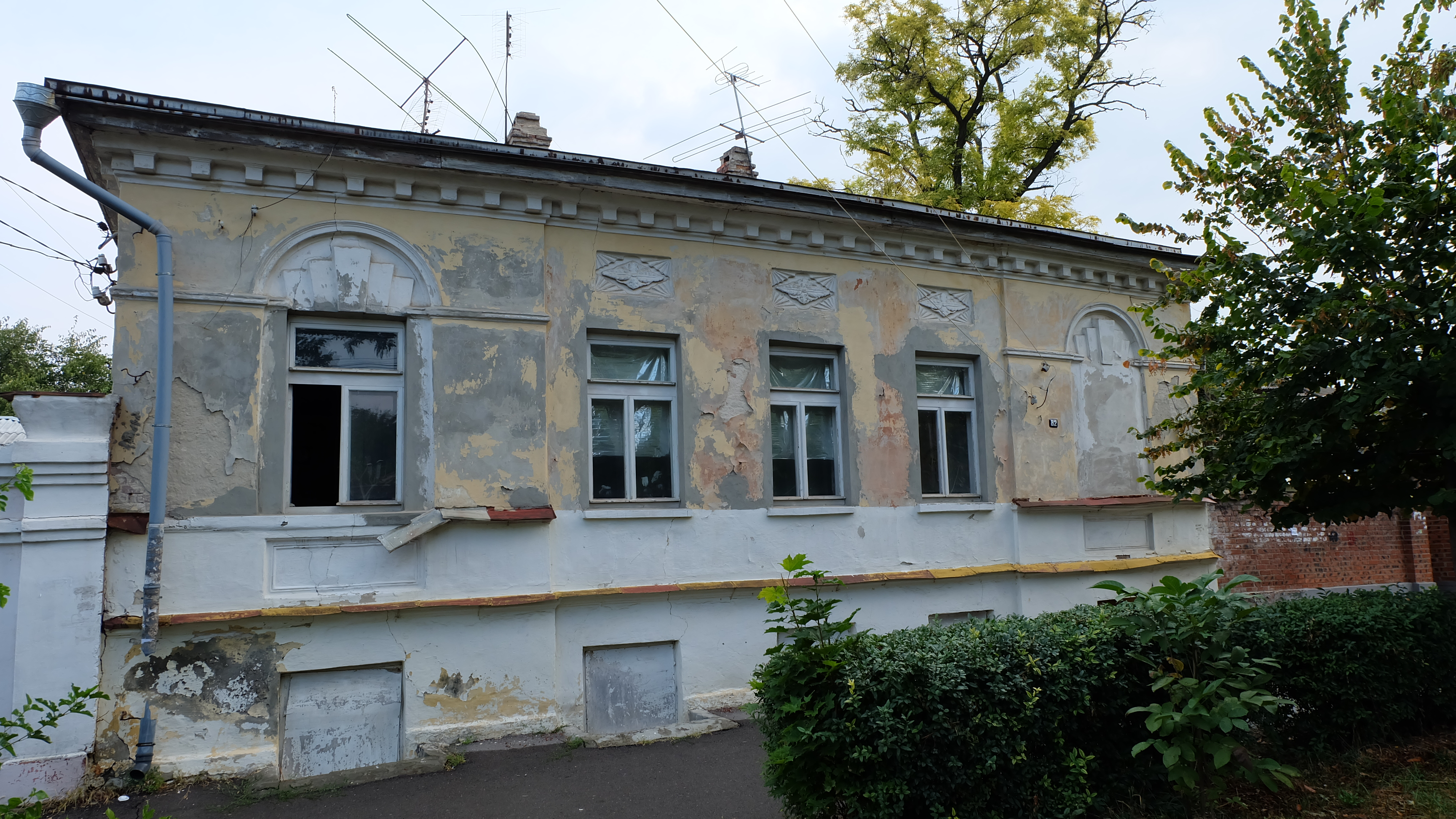
- Interactive map of the House of Sirotinykh area

General information
- Location: Taganrog, Chekhov Street, 82
- Coordinates: 47°12′34″N 38°55′36″E

The House of Sirotinykh (Russian: Дом Сиротиных) is an object of cultural heritage in the street Chekhova, 82 in the city of Taganrog of the Rostov Oblast. Belongs to the category of monuments of architecture.

== History ==
In the first half of the 19th century in Taganrog the polutoraetazhny mansion was built. In the 1870s years the house was owned by M. F. Sirotina who was a sister of the poet Nikolay Fyodorovich Shcherbina. He periodically stayed in this house.

The writer Anton Pavlovich Chekhov studied together with the son Sirotinykh — Vladimir. They were on friendly terms, and he also often was visited the house in school time, was here in 1881 when came from Moscow. V. A. Sirotin became the Cossack centurion, his wife was called Maria. And it from 1890s is registered as the owner of this house. Marriage was not long: Vladimir and Maria divorced, and she married again, in new marriage having taken herself a surname Steyger.

Between 1915 and 1918, Ivan Akimovich Regetti was an owner of the mansion. He was the trade deputy from the municipal Public government.

According to the Decision No. 301 of 18.11.1992 the house Sirotinykh is a monument of architecture and treats objects of cultural heritage.

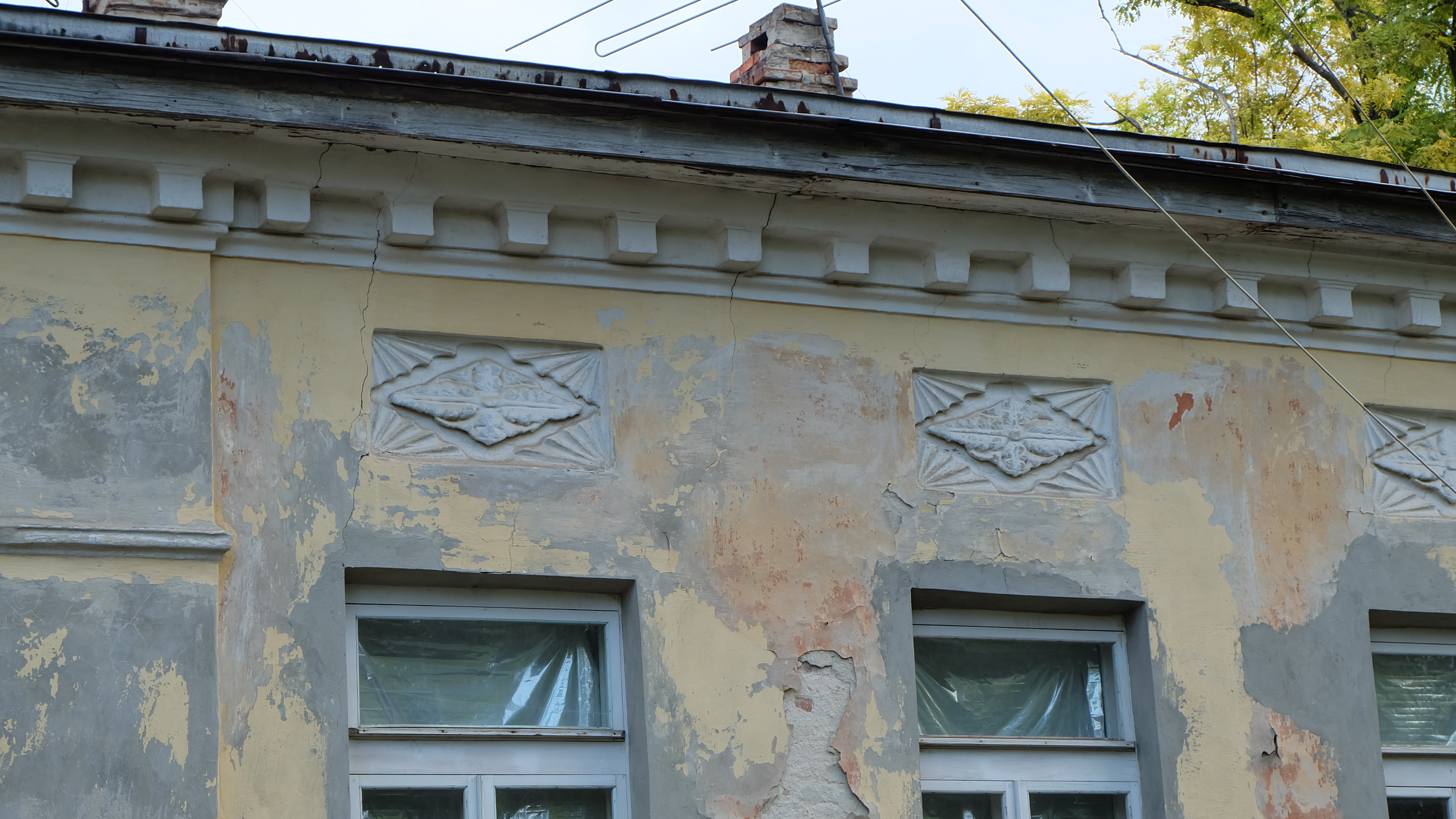

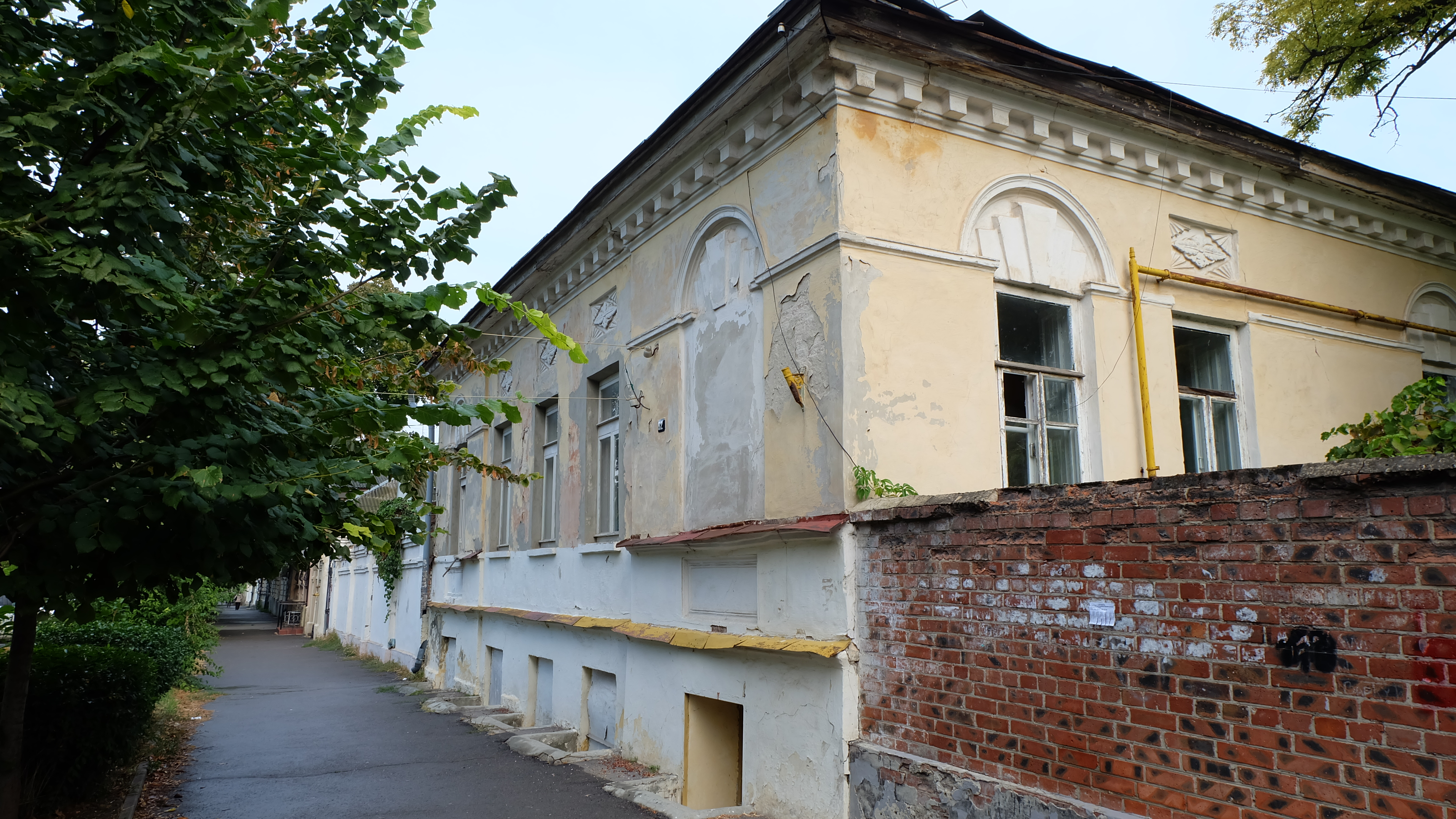
