= Shtalberg House =

- Дом Штальберга
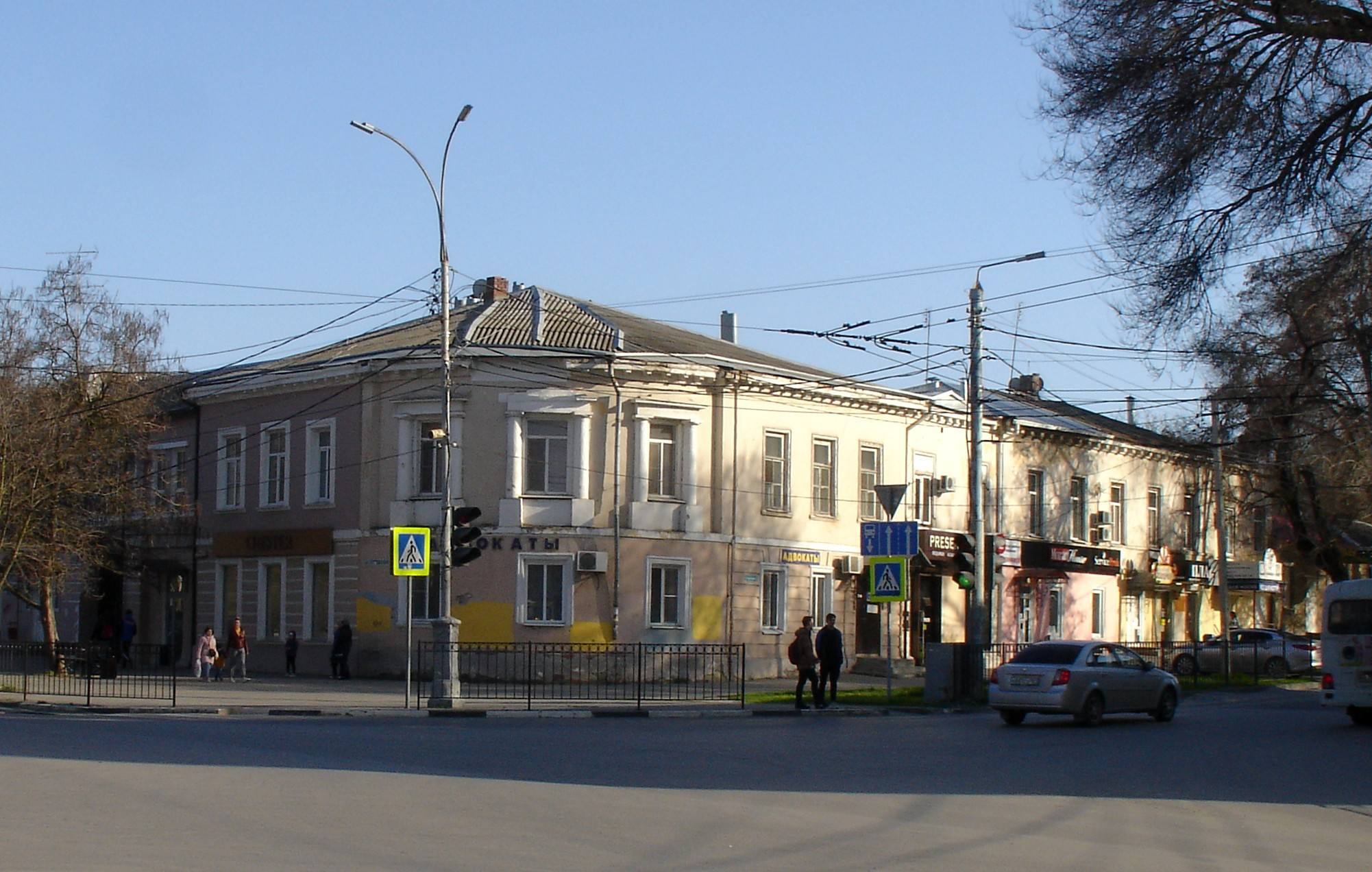
- House of Shalberg
- Interactive map of Shtalberg House
- Location: Taganrog, 105 Petrovskaya Street

The House of Shtalberg (Russian: Дом Штальберга) is a building of regional cultural heritage. It is at 105 Petrovsky Street, Taganrog, in Rostov Oblast.

== History ==
The House was built In the second quarter of the 19th century in classical style. In the 1840s the house was owned by German Ebergard Karlovic Lorentz, who was registered as an outside adviser. Lorentz taught Latin and German at a men's gymnasium before the 1860s. Ebergard Lorentz's spouse was Adelaide Lyudvigovna. It initiated opening in 1848 in the house of the spouse of "Maiden boarding house". In 1863, 32 schoolgirls arrived from Nakhchivan-on-Don, Rostov-on-Don and Novocherkassk. It was the school of the "closed" type. According to the Charter of Educational Institutions, approved on 8 December 1828, the maintenance of boards at gymnasiums happened at the expense of the made donations. In the third quarter of the 19th century the tradeswoman of the third guild Matrona Nikitichna Batasheva made extensions in the territory of a household. Trade in sugar goods was primary activity of the tradeswoman.

On 2 March 1882 (according to other data – on 2 March 1886) in the house the new educational institution was open. Several years later it became two-complete. Here teachers taught: M. N. Grekov, E. Grekova, A. I. Blonskaya. Achilles Nikolaevich Alferaki was a trustee of school. By the period of opening of this educational institution and the beginning of its work Ebergard Karlovic Lorentz died. His wife Adelaide Lyudvigovna lived till 1899. They had several children: daughters Sofia and Louise, son Karl. Louise was not married, died in 1918. Karl Ebergardovich studied in a gymnasium together with the writer Anton Pavlovich Chekhov.

At the beginning of the 20th century the house became the property of the merchant from Tiraspol Alexander Moiseevich Shtalberg, by last name which the structure is mentioned in historical sources. Some part of rooms of a household was rented by A. E. Kuzovenkova-Anino who equipped since 1902 a parental shelter here. In the 1910th years Alexander Ivanovich Perov opened a photographer's studio in this house which enjoyed wide popularity at locals. Perov's wife was called Anastasia Dmitriyevna, in family there were several children — Antonina, Vera, Nadezhda and Elena. In the 1920th years in the house the club of metalworkers of the boiler plant was located. In 1992 the house down the street Petrovsky, 105, is recognized as an object of cultural heritage and a monument of architecture. It is protected by the law.
