= Taganrog =

City in Rostov Oblast, Russia

Taganrog Таганрог
- City
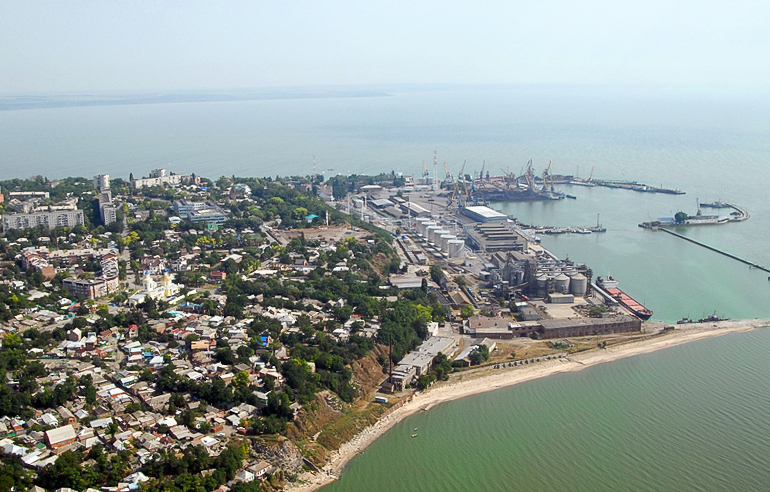
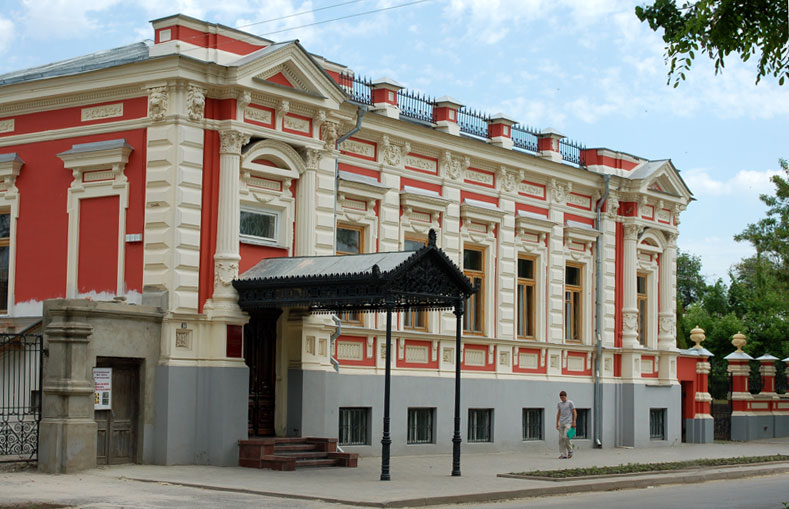
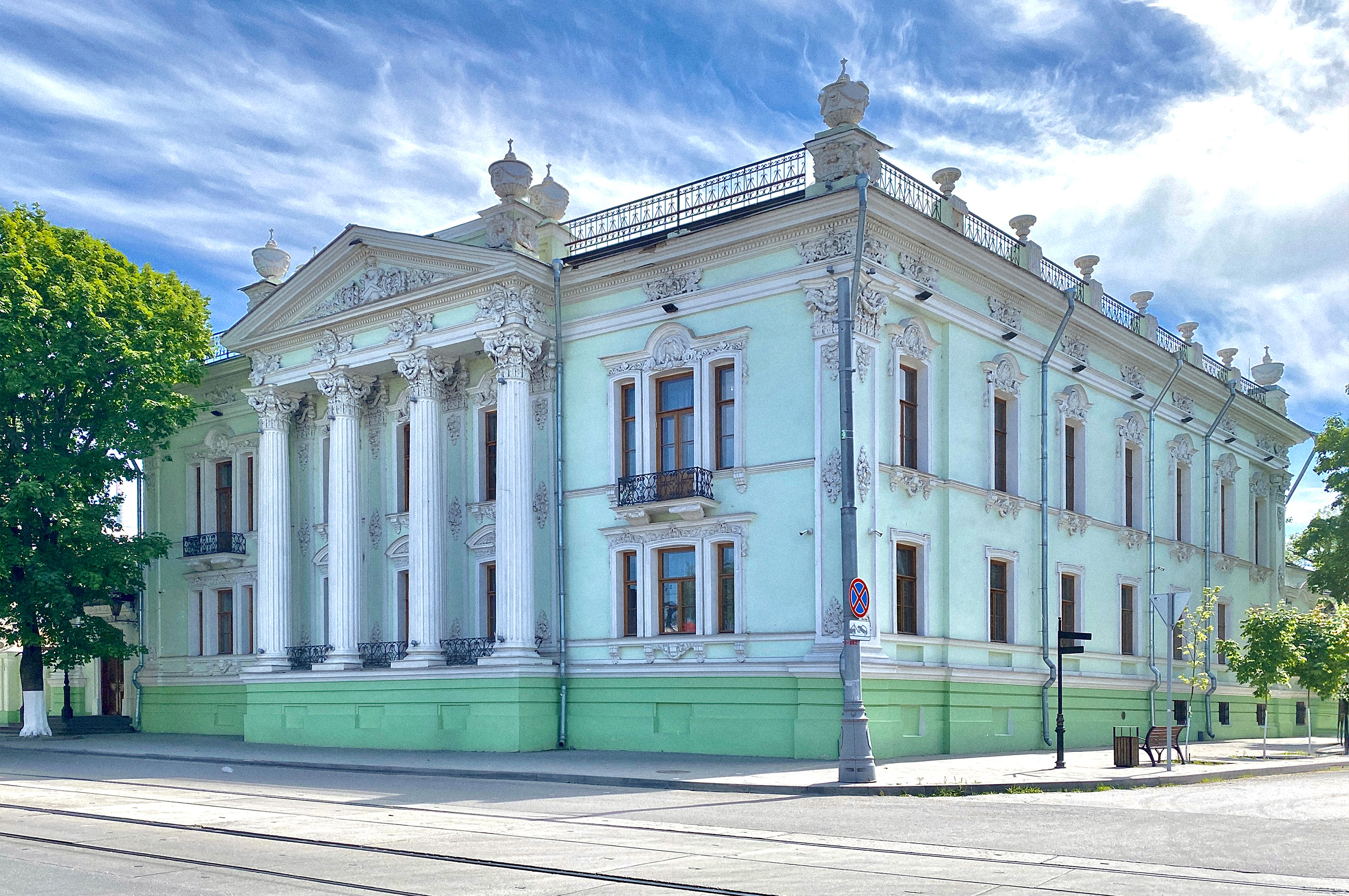
- Aerial view of the port Museum of Art Alferaki Palace

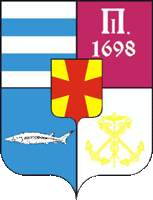
- Flag Coat of arms
- Anthem: Anthem of Taganrog
- Interactive map of Taganrog
- Location of Taganrog Taganrog (European Russia) Taganrog (Europe)
- Coordinates: 47°13′N 38°55′E
- Country: Russia
- Federal subject: Rostov Oblast
- Founded: September 12, 1698
- City status since: 1775

Government
  - Body: City Duma
  - Head: Mikhail Solonitsin

Area
  - Total: 80 km^{2} (31 sq mi)
- Elevation: 30 m (98 ft)

Population (2010 Census)
  - Total: 257,681
  - Estimate (2025): 251,100 (−2.6%)
  - Rank: 72nd in 2010
  - Density: 3,200/km^{2} (8,300/sq mi)

Administrative status
  - Subordinated to: Taganrog Urban Okrug
  - Capital of: Taganrog Urban Okrug

Municipal status
  - Urban okrug: Taganrog Urban Okrug
  - Capital of: Taganrog Urban Okrug
- Time zone: UTC+3 (MSK)
- Postal codes: 347900, 347902, 347904, 347905, 347909, 347910, 347913, 347916, 347919, 347922–347924, 347927, 347928, 347930–347932, 347935, 347936, 347939, 347942, 347943, 347949, 347990
- Dialing code: +7 8634
- OKTMO ID: 60737000001
- City Day: September 12
- Website: tagancity.ru

Taganrog (Russian: Таганрог, IPA: [təɡɐnˈrok]; Ukrainian: Таганрог or Таганріг, romanized: Tahanroh, Tahanrih) is a port city in Rostov Oblast, Russia, on the north shore of Taganrog Bay in the Sea of Azov, several kilometers west of the mouth of the Don River. It is in the Black Sea region. Population: 245,120 (2021 census); 257,681 (2010 census); 281,947 (2002 census); 291,622 (1989 Soviet census).

Located at the site of an ancient Greek and medieval Italian colony, modern Taganrog was founded in 1698. Contested by various factions during World War I and the Russian Civil War, the city served as the temporary Soviet Ukrainian capital in 1918.

== Demographics ==
Historical population

Year	Pop.	±%
1897	51,000	—
1926	86,000	+68.6%
1939	188,781	+119.5%
1959	202,062	+7.0%
1970	254,154	+25.8%

Year	Pop.	±%
1979	276,444	+8.8%
1989	291,622	+5.5%
2002	281,947	−3.3%
2010	257,681	−8.6%
2021	245,120	−4.9%

Source: Census data

== History ==
The history of the city goes back to the late Bronze Age–early Iron Age. Later, it became the earliest Greek settlement in the northeastern Black Sea region and was probably mentioned by the Greek historian Herodotus as emporion Kremnoi (Κρήμνοι, meaning cliffs). It had contacts as well to the other Greek colonies around the Black Sea as well as to the indigenous communities of the hinterland.

In the 13th century, Pisan merchants founded a colony, Portus Pisanus, which was however short-lived.

Taganrog was founded by Peter the Great on 12 September 1698 and served as the base of the Azov Flotilla. In 1712, it passed to the Ottoman Empire and the fort was destroyed. In 1769, it was recaptured by Russia. The city was officially reincorporated by the Russian Empire according to the 1774 Treaty of Küçük Kaynarca. The first Russian Navy base, it hosted the Azov Flotilla of Catherine the Great (1770–1783), which subsequently became the Russian Black Sea Fleet. Taganrog was granted city status in 1775. From 1775 it was administratively located in the Azov Governorate, and then from 1784 in the Yekaterinoslav Governorate.

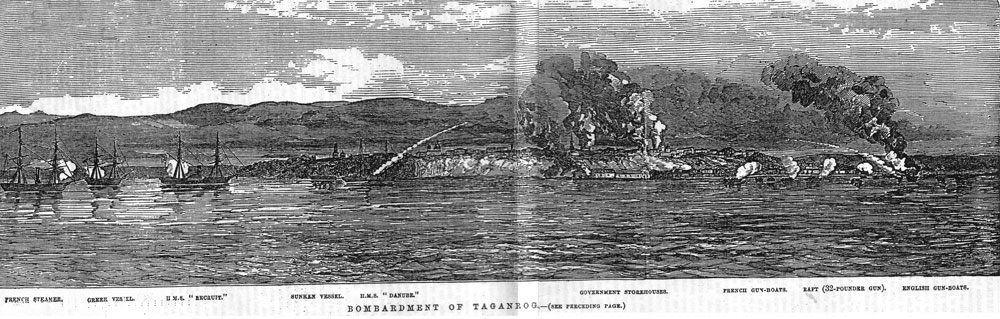
Bombardment of Taganrog in 1855

By the end of the 18th century, Taganrog had lost its importance as a military base after Crimea and the entire Sea of Azov were absorbed into the Russian Empire. In 1802, Tsar Alexander I granted the city special status, which lasted until 1887. In 1825, the Alexander I Palace in Taganrog was used as his summer residence, and he died there in November 1825. Also in Taganrog is the House of Teacher, a mansion where numerous artists have performed. Between 1887 and 1920 the city served as an okrug centre of the Don Host.

Although it was besieged by Anglo-French fleet in 1855 during the Crimean War, Taganrog became important as a commercial port, used for the import of grain by the end of the 19th century until the early 20th century. Industrialization increased in the city when Belgian and German investors founded a boiler factory, an iron and steel foundry, a leather factory, and an oil press factory. By 1911, fifteen foreign consulates had opened in the city.

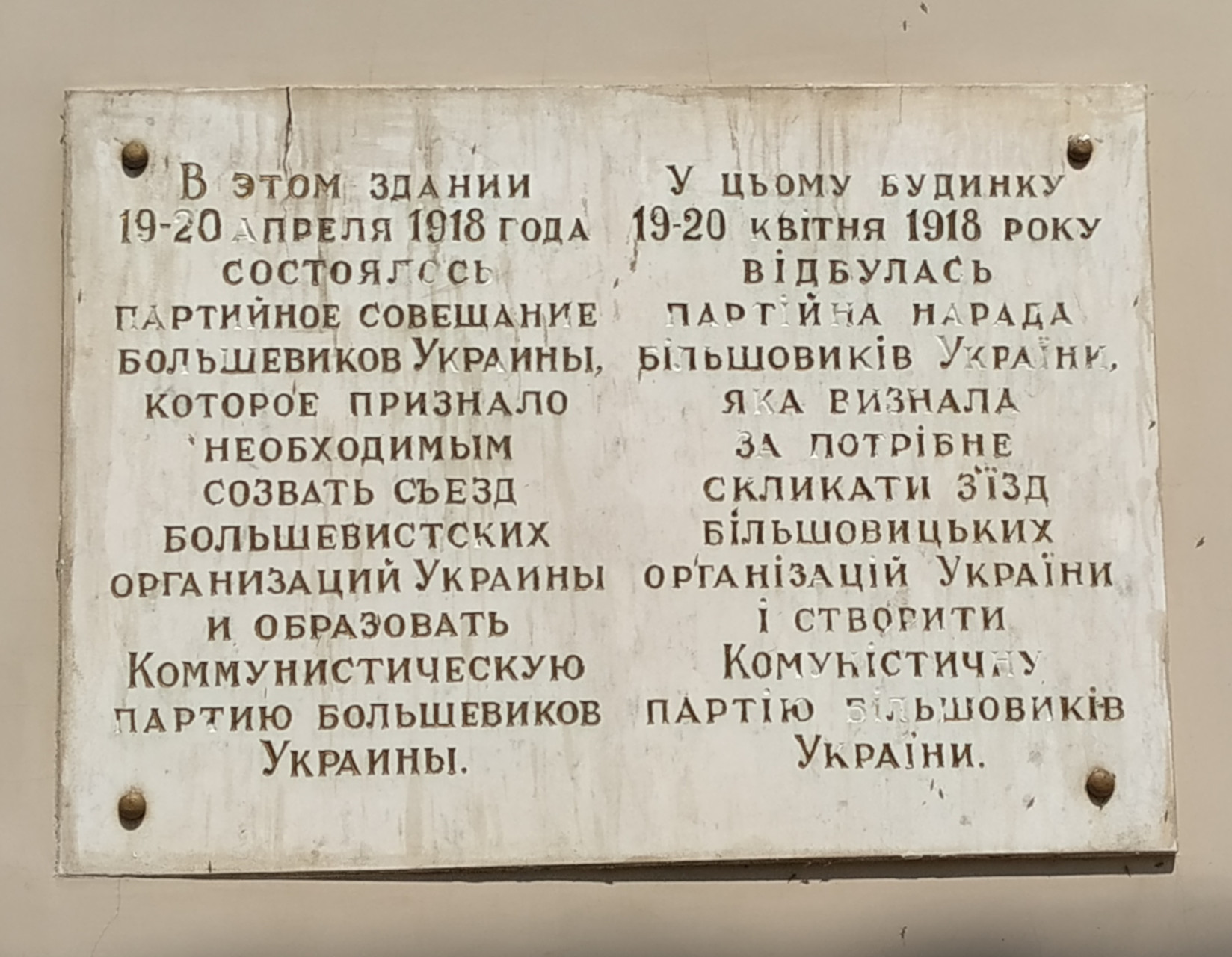
Plaque commemorating the foundation of the Communist Party of Ukraine in 1918 in the former Bristol Hotel

Between 1905 and 1915 a Ukrainian hromada community was active in the city. During World War I, Taganrog served as the temporary capital of the Ukrainian Soviet Republic in March–April 1918. Afterwards it was occupied by the troops of the German Army from May to August 1918. In 1919, General Anton Denikin established his headquarters at the Avgerino mansion in the city while commanding White Russian troops fighting in South Russia during the Russian Civil War. When the White Russians were defeated and Bolshevik power was established in the city on 25 December 1919, Denikin's remaining troops and the British Consulate were evacuated by HMS Montrose.

Full power was granted to the executive committee of The City Soviet Workers' council on 17 December 1920, and Taganrog joined the Ukrainian SSR as the administrative center of Taganrog okruha. It was transferred to the Russian SFSR along with Shakhty okruha on 1 October 1924, becoming part of Southeastern Oblast, and later North Caucasus Krai. In 1937 Taganrog was administratively incorporated into Rostov Oblast.

During World War II, Taganrog was occupied by Nazi Germany from 1941 to 1943 during Operation Barbarossa, when two SS divisions entered the city on 17 October 1941, followed by the Wehrmacht. The city suffered extensive damage. Under German occupation the local government system was replaced by a German-style Bürgermeisteramt (Mayor's Office), which governed the city until it was liberated by the Red Army on 30 August 1943.

== Administrative and municipal status ==
Within the framework of administrative divisions, it is incorporated as Taganrog Urban Okrug—an administrative unit with the status equal to that of the districts. As a municipal division, this administrative unit also has urban okrug status.

== Economy ==
Taganrog is the leading industrial center of Rostov Oblast. Local industry is represented by aerospace, machine-building, automobile, military, iron and steel industry, engineering, metal traders and processors, timber, woodwork, pulp and paper, food, light, chemical and construction materials. The city is one of the major ports of the Sea of Azov.

The biggest company currently operating in Taganrog is Taganrog Iron & Steel Factory, (publicly traded company Tagmet), which manufactures steel, steel pipe, for oil and gas industry and consumer goods. The other major employer is Taganrog Auto Factory (TagAZ Ltd.), which originated from Taganrog Combine Harvester Factory. The plant manufactures automobiles licensed by Hyundai. The production line includes Hyundai Accent compact sedan, mid-size Hyundai Sonata, sport utility vehicle Santa Fe, and Hyundai Porter pickup truck. Taganrog is also home to the aircraft design bureau Beriev.

The area around Taganrog has a large industrial potential, a diversified agricultural industry, production plants, and a modern infrastructure. The location of Taganrog on the intersection of traffic routes and the seaport facilitate access to the emerging CIS markets.

Taganrog's main trading partners are the CIS countries, South Korea, Turkey, Italy, Greece, and Egypt.

== Military ==
The Taganrog air base is six kilometres (3 nmi) northwest of the city and hosts the Taganrog Aviation Museum. The city also hosts the Taganrog military museum.

== Higher education ==
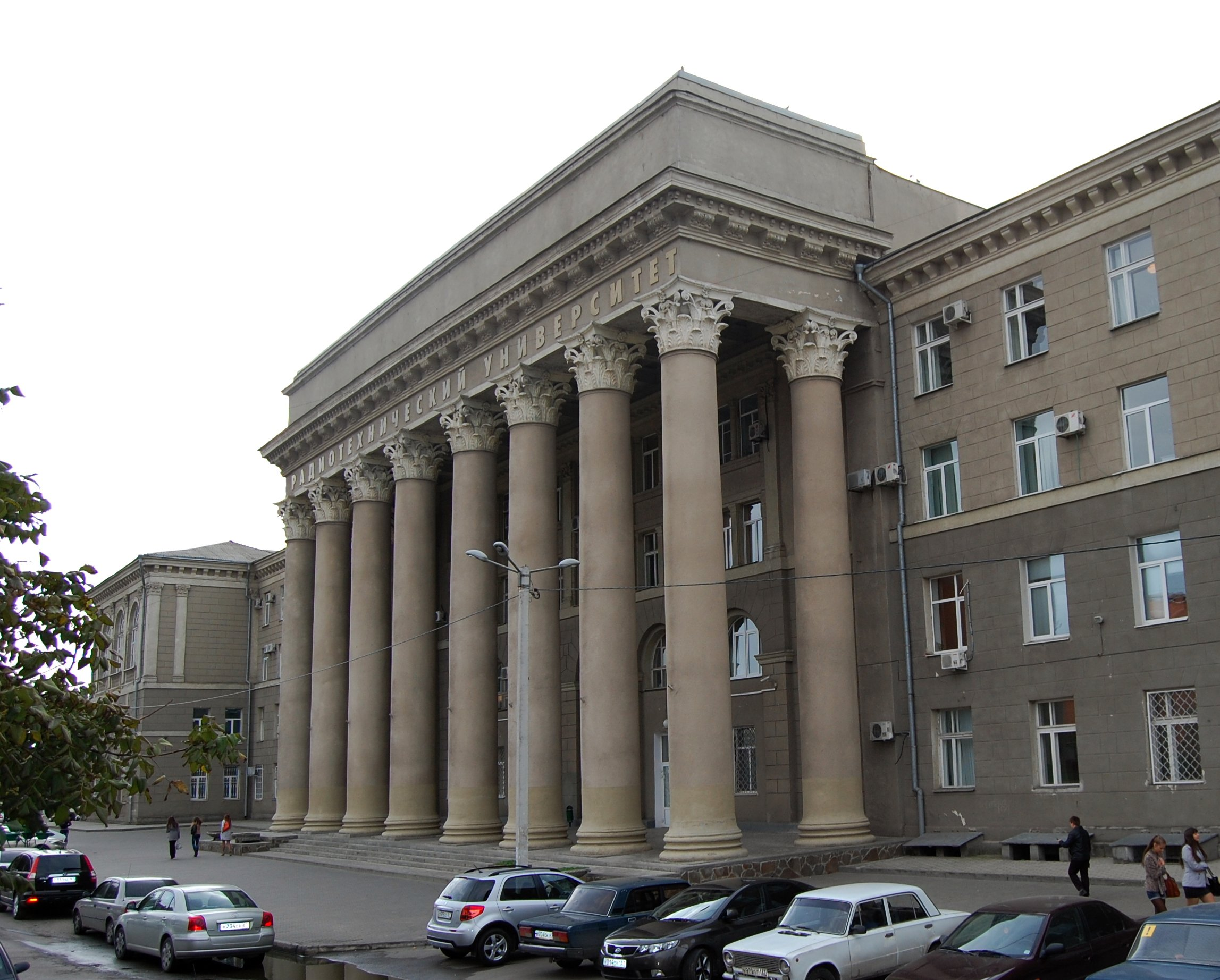
Taganrog College of Technologies

- Taganrog College of Technologies
- Taganrog State Pedagogical Institute
- Taganrog College of Management and Economy

== Climate ==
The climate of Taganrog is temperate (Köppen climate classification Cfa/Dfa). Taganrog experiences moderately cold (mild by Russian standards) winters and hot summers.

Climate data for Taganrog (1991–2020, extremes 1905–present)
Month	Jan	Feb	Mar	Apr	May	Jun	Jul	Aug	Sep	Oct	Nov	Dec	Year
Record high °C (°F)	13.2 (55.8)	15.6 (60.1)	22.0 (71.6)	28.4 (83.1)	35.8 (96.4)	37.4 (99.3)	40.5 (104.9)	40.5 (104.9)	35.6 (96.1)	30.5 (86.9)	22.7 (72.9)	14.5 (58.1)	40.5 (104.9)
Mean daily maximum °C (°F)	0.1 (32.2)	1.3 (34.3)	7.0 (44.6)	15.4 (59.7)	22.2 (72.0)	27.1 (80.8)	29.9 (85.8)	29.5 (85.1)	22.9 (73.2)	15.0 (59.0)	6.8 (44.2)	1.7 (35.1)	14.9 (58.8)
Daily mean °C (°F)	−2.5 (27.5)	−1.9 (28.6)	3.2 (37.8)	10.9 (51.6)	17.6 (63.7)	22.3 (72.1)	24.7 (76.5)	24.1 (75.4)	18.0 (64.4)	11.0 (51.8)	3.8 (38.8)	−0.9 (30.4)	10.9 (51.6)
Mean daily minimum °C (°F)	−4.5 (23.9)	−4.2 (24.4)	0.5 (32.9)	7.5 (45.5)	13.6 (56.5)	18.0 (64.4)	20.2 (68.4)	19.4 (66.9)	13.8 (56.8)	7.9 (46.2)	1.6 (34.9)	−2.8 (27.0)	7.6 (45.7)
Record low °C (°F)	−32.0 (−25.6)	−29.5 (−21.1)	−23.7 (−10.7)	−7.0 (19.4)	−0.9 (30.4)	4.6 (40.3)	9.6 (49.3)	7.3 (45.1)	−0.2 (31.6)	−10.3 (13.5)	−20.9 (−5.6)	−26.1 (−15.0)	−32.0 (−25.6)
Average precipitation mm (inches)	58 (2.3)	48 (1.9)	45 (1.8)	39 (1.5)	51 (2.0)	59 (2.3)	39 (1.5)	36 (1.4)	49 (1.9)	42 (1.7)	49 (1.9)	56 (2.2)	571 (22.5)
Average precipitation days	13.7	12.9	11.4	9.9	8.9	8.9	7.8	6.6	6.7	8.8	11.4	14.4	121.5
Mean monthly sunshine hours	60	80	129	195	271	293	318	305	237	158	70	44	2,160
Source 1: Pogoda.ru.net
Source 2: Climatebase (precipitation days, sun 1916–2012)

== Culture ==
=== Architecture ===
Alferaki Palace, Bishop's House, also known as Kirsanov's house, Chapel of Our Lady of Kazan, Taganrog, Shtalberg House, Telegraph House and the House of Subsovich, House of Deminoj-Cachoni, House of Voroshilkin, Stepan Akimov House, House of Sirotinykh, House of Lukin, House of Lobanov, House of Averino, Mansion of Handrin, House of Rabinovich are located in Taganrog.

== Taganrog in literature ==
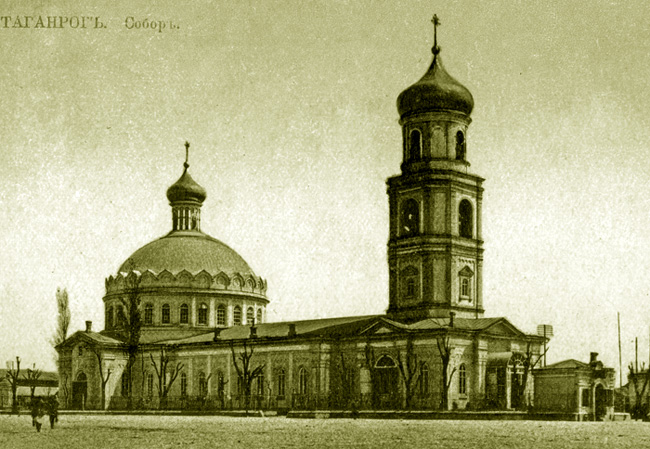
The Assumption Cathedral in Taganrog (1818–1938), where Anton Chekhov was christened on February 10, 1860

Anton Chekhov, a native of Taganrog, featured the city and its people in many of his works, including Ionych, The House with an Attic, The Man in a Shell, Van'ka, Three Years, Mask, and My Life. It is believed that Taganrog may have been the Lukomorye (fairy tale land) in which Alexander Pushkin's Ruslan and Lyudmila (1820) was set. The city also appeared in the novels of Ivan Vasilenko and Konstantin Paustovsky and in the poems of Nikolay Sherbina and Valentin Parnakh.

The legend of "Elder Fyodor Kuzmich" is cited in the book Roza Mira by Russian mystic Daniil Andreyev. According to this legend, the Russian tsar Alexander I did not die in Taganrog, but instead left his crown and the status of monarch to continue his life as a traveling hermit.

In foreign literature, the city was mentioned in the titles of Der Tote von Taganrog by Eberhard von Cranach-Sichart and Taganrog by Reinhold Schneider.

In 2004 Sabine Wichert published a collection of poems entitled Taganrog.

In Maria Kuncewiczowa's 1945 novel The Stranger (New York, LB Fischer publisher), the city of Taganrog plays an essential role as a place of nostalgic happiness for the uprooted Polish musician and matriarch, Rose.

== Notable people ==
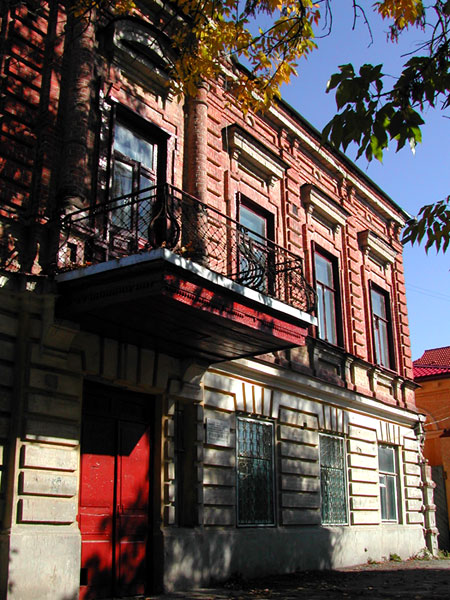
Birth house of Faina Ranevskaya

Numerous Russian and international aristocrats, politicians, artists, and scientists were born and/or have lived in Taganrog. Taganrog is the native city of

- Anton Chekhov (1860–1904)
- Faina Ranevskaya (1896–1984)
- Sophia Parnok (1885–1933)
- Alexandre Koyré (1892–1964)
- Isaac Yakovlevich Pavlovsky (1853–1924)
- Witold Rowicki (1914–1989)
- Georgy Sedov (1877–1914)
- Dmitri Sinodi-Popov (1855–1910)
- Natalya Agapyeva (1883–1956)

It is also associated with:

- Peter I of Russia
- Alexander I of Russia
- Cornelius Cruys
- Giuseppe Garibaldi
- Pyotr Ilyich Tchaikovsky
- Adolph Brodsky
- Konstantin Paustovsky
- Nestor Kukolnik
- Achilles Alferaki
- Ioannis Varvakis
- Vasily Zolotarev
- Sergei Bondarchuk
- William Frederick Yeames
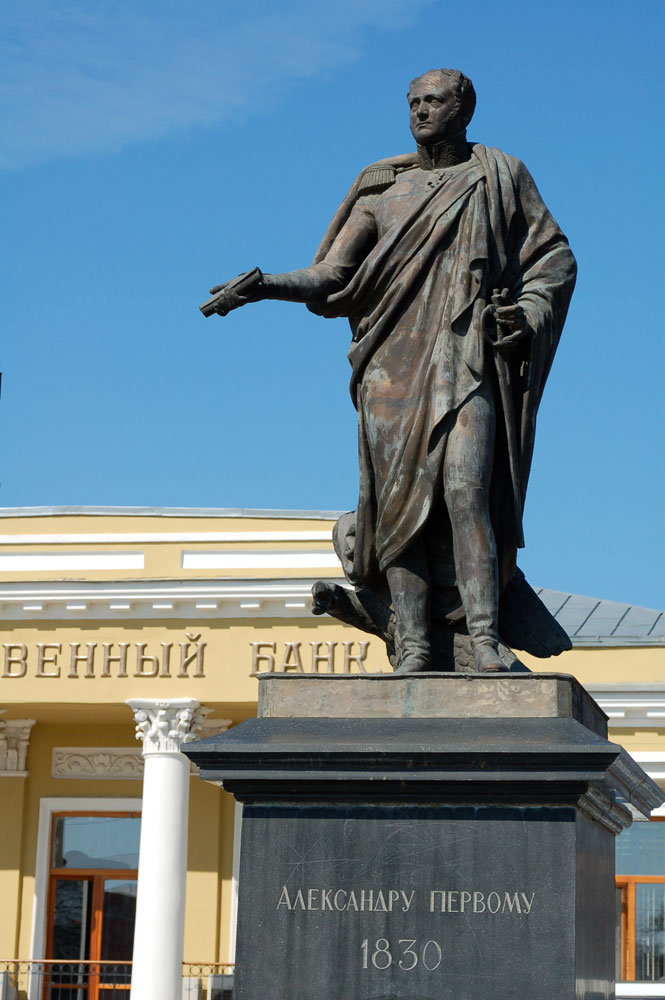
Alexander I Statue in Taganrog

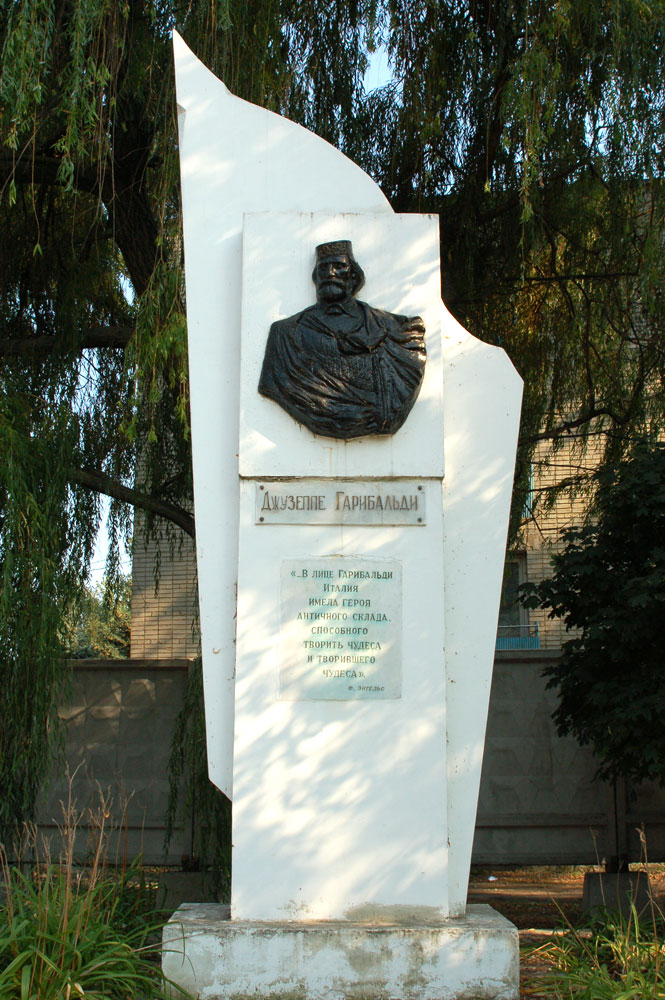
Garibaldi Monument in Taganrog

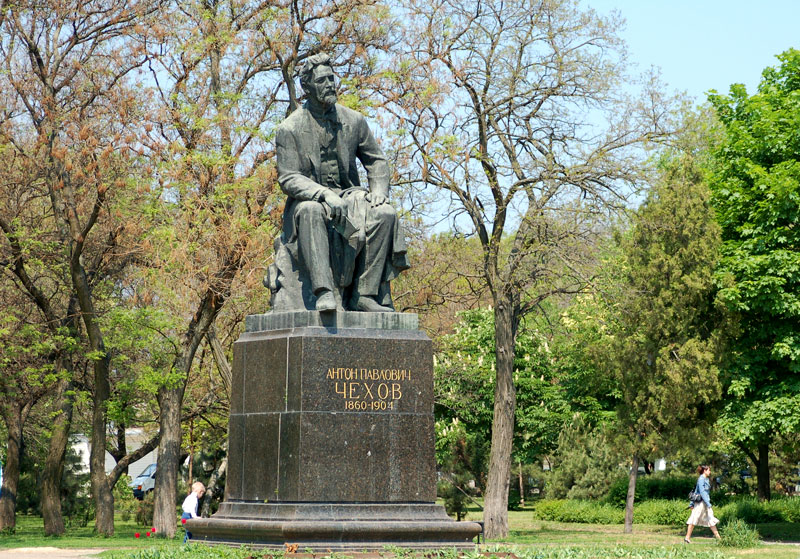
Chekhov Monument in Taganrog

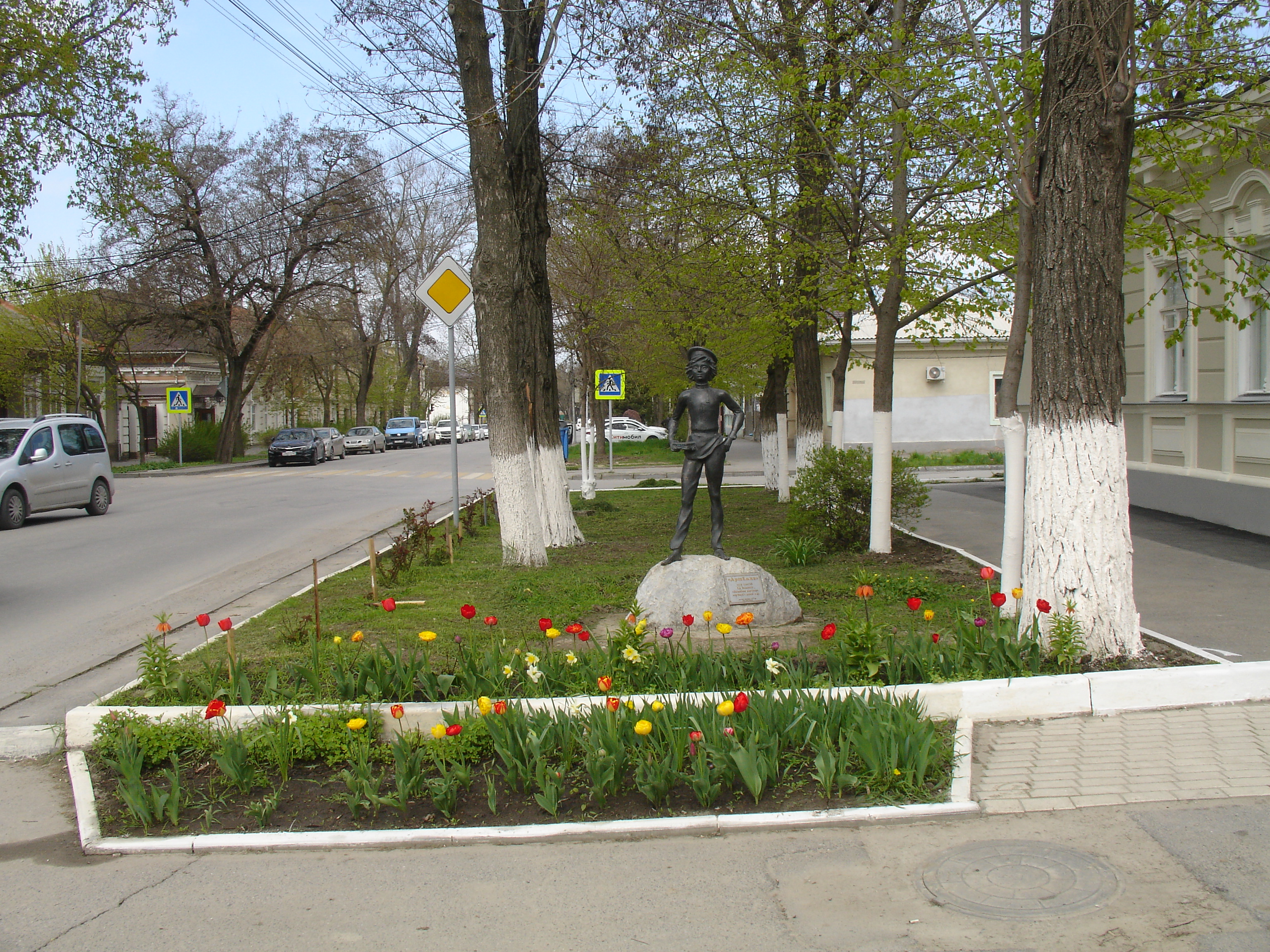
Monument "Artyomka"

== Twin towns – sister cities ==
Taganrog is twinned with:

- Antratsyt, Ukraine (2012)
- Badenweiler, Germany (2002)
- Cherven Bryag, Bulgaria (1963)
- Jining, China (2009)
- Khartsyzk, Ukraine (2009)
- Lüdenscheid, Germany (1991)
- Odesa, Ukraine

== See also ==
- Apostolopulo House
- Chapel of Our Lady of Kazan, Taganrog
- House of Laskin
- House of Sinodi-Popov
- Bust of Lenin (Taganrog)
- Freken Bock (Cafe)
- Mariupol Cemetery
- Taganrog Palace of Youth
- Monument of Cathopoul
- House of Zolotaryov
- Memorable sign Barrier
- House of Skizerl
- House of the merchant Kudrin
- House of Perestiani
- House of Lakiyerov
- House of Lakiyer
- Korolev and Gagarin Monument
- SIZO-2
- Taganrog Priboy plant
- Vosstaniya Square
