= House of Perestiani =

- Дом Перестиани
- Interactive map of House of Perestiani
- Location: Taganrog, 64 Greek street
- Coordinates: 47°12′49″N 38°56′08″E

The House of Perestiani (Russian: Дом Перестиани) is a model of background building of the 19th century: 64 Greek St in Taganrog, Rostov Oblast.

== History ==
At the beginning of the 1860s to the modern address 64 Grecheskaya Street, the two-storeyed house which for 1880 belonged to the official Nikolay Afanasyevich Perestiani was built. He was a native of the wealthy family of merchants, held a position of the magistrate judge and was a member of an artistic society of Taganrog. The first marriage was unsuccessful, and with the first wife, it parted. At Nikolay, Afanasyevich was two children born out of marriage from the actress Anna Ivanovna Solodukhina (a creative pseudonym – Alexandrov). Younger of these children became the film director and the actor, Ivan Nikolaevich Perestiani who acted in movies "Red Little Devils" and "Three Lives". Nikolay Afanasyevich Perestiani spent many forces, submitted various applications of office that his children were not considered as illegitimate and as a result achieved official adoption. Lidiya Pavlovna Petropavlovskaya became his second official wife. It also had the second marriage – she was a widow of a collegiate assessor. The wedding was held on October 15, 1872, in marriage with Lidiya Petropavlovskaya was born three children: Lidiya, Lyudmila, and Mstislav. Nikolay Afanasyevich died in 1899.

From 1890 to 1906 the house was owned by Lidiya Perestiani. In 1915 the barrister's wife Elena Konstantinovna Kovalevskaya became the owner of the house.

== Description ==
The house is built of a brick, two-storeyed, built on the stone base. As of 1871 at the house, there was a wing, the big yard, and wooden services. A house facade at the level of the first-floor рустован. Shod gate and a gate are located between brick poles. In the yard, the two-storeyed ledge which serves as the central entrance settles down. Windows which are on the first floor are decorated with capstones with lion's masks which are placed over a design. Windows on the second floor possess a rectangular shape, they are taken away in simple platbands. The crowning eaves on a facade lean on arms.
