= Anna Hojska =

Ruthenian noblewoman

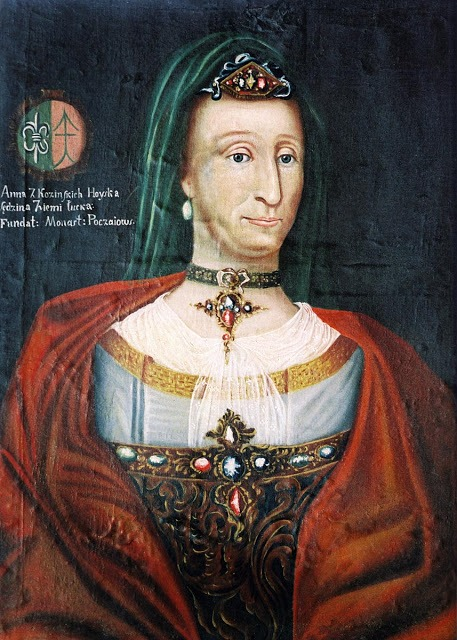
- Portrait of Anna Hojska
- Native name: Ганна Гостська
- Known for: Donating lands and the Theotokos of Pochayiv to Pochaiv Lavra
- Born: Anna Tikhonovna Erofeyeva Kosiñska c. 1530; Grand Duchy of Lithuania
- Died: c. 1617
- Noble family: Kozyñski
- Spouse: Vasyl Hojski (d. 1581)

Anna Tikhonovna Erofeyeva Hojska (née Kosiñska, c. 1530–1617) was a Ruthenian noblewoman and patron of religion. She was a benefactor of the Ukrainian Orthodox monastery Pochaiv Lavra, where she also founded a printing house, donating extensive lands and a miracle-working icon of Theotokos.

== Biography ==
Hojska was born about 1530 and was descended from the ancient Ruthenian (Ukrainian) noble family of Kozyñski. She was married to Vasyl Hojski (died 1581), a judge of Lutsk in the Grand Duchy of Lithuania. The couple did not have any children and she remained a widow after his death.

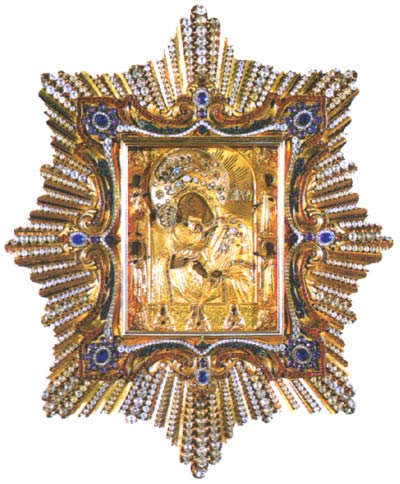
The icon Theotokos of Pochayiv, or Our Lady of Pochayiv, set in a golden diadem presented by Pope Clement XIV

Hojska was a member of the Orthodox Church. In 1597, she donated extensive lands and funds to a group of monks so that they could build the lavra monastery: Pochaiv Lavra. She also funded the foundation of a printing house there.

Hojska donated a miracle working Byzantine Eleusa icon of Theotokos (the title of Mary, mother of Jesus in Eastern Christianity). The icon was given to her by Neophitos of Constantinople in gratitude for staying at her estate near Pochaev during his travels through Volyn lands. The icon was said to have cured her brother Pylyp Kozyñski of blindness and she felt that the holy image should not be kept solely for herself. It became known as Theotokos of Pochayiv, or Our Lady of Pochayiv, and one of the most venerated icons in Ukraine.

Hojska died in 1617.
