= Theotokos of Pochayiv =

Eastern Orthodox icon of the Virgin Mary

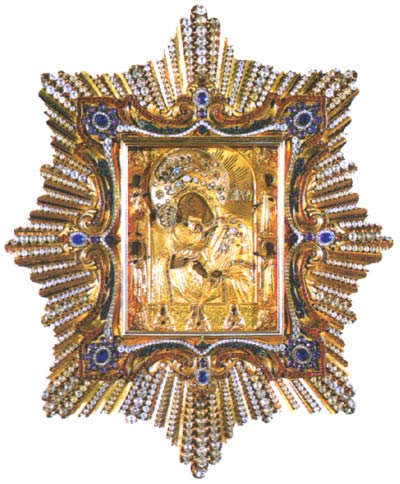
Holy icon of the Theotokos of Pochaiv, set in the golden diadem presented by Pope Clement XIV.

Theotokos of Pochayiv (Ukrainian: Почаївська ікона Пресвятої Богородиці) is an icon of the Virgin Mary, painted in a late Byzantine style, of the Eleusa iconographic type. Like many famous icons, it is now usually displayed with most of the surface covered by an elaborate frame in precious metals, or riza, except for the faces.

The icon is venerated equally by Eastern Orthodox and Catholics.

The origin of the icon is not clear. It is painted in old Byzantine manner, hence it could be made in either Byzantium or Bulgaria.

== Icon description ==
The icon belongs to the Eleusa type. The Mother of God is depicted with baby Jesus, who is leaning against her face. The icon also shows a rock. According to legend, there is a footprint of the Virgin Mary on this rock.

== History of the icon ==
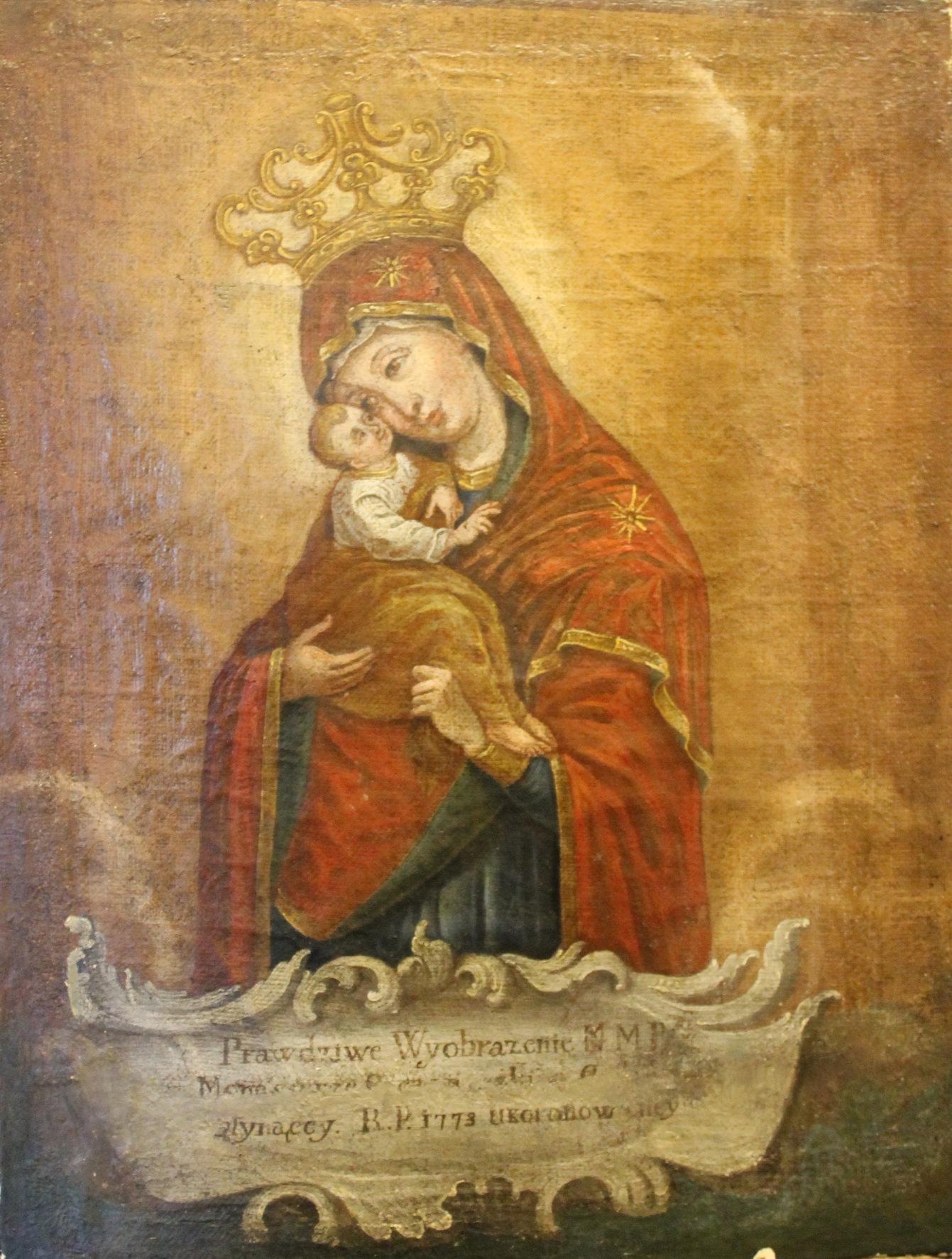
The Catholic icon of The Holy Virgin of Pochaiv. Second half of the 19th century. From the Museum of Ukrainian Home Icons (Radomysl Castle, Ukraine)

It has been in the Pochaiv Lavra (monastery), in Ternopil oblast, Ukraine, since 1597, when it was given by a wealthy widow Anna or Hanna Hoyska, who owned the town of Pochaiv in the second half of the 16th century. Anna had received the sacred image from the Greek metropolitan Neophyte.

According to some sources, the Virgin Mary depicted on the icon helped to heal Philip, the brother of Hanna Hoyska, from blindness. Later, the Theotokos of Pochayiv acquired a reputation as a miracle-working icon.

=== Crowning of the icon ===
Coronation rites were practiced in the Roman Catholic and Greek Catholic churches. Count N. Potocki, who converted to the Uniate faith, began the coronation of the Pochaiv Mother of God in the 1760s. Evidence of miracles was studied by Bishop Sylvester Rudnytskyi, who specially arrived in Pochaev. After confirming the truth of the miracles, permission was given for the coronation. The general list of miracles starts in 1661.

April 23, 1773, Pope Clement XIV, meeting the request of the count Nicolas Potocki sent two small golden crowns for the icon — one for the Holy Virgin, the other for Jesus.

The solemn coronation of the icon took place on September 8, 1773. It was conducted by two Greek Catholic bishops - S. Rudnytskyi and M. Rillo. More than 33,000 believers came to the ceremony.

Nicolas Potocki published a book dedicated to the coronation of the icon.

This event contributed to the establishment of the cult of the icon.

In 1869, the icon was decorated with a golden robe with precious stones and placed in a gilded kiot.

== Our time ==
Nowadays, the icon is located in the Assumption Cathedral of the Lavra. It can be seen after the morning Liturgy. Monks lower the icon to the level of human height. Every year, thousands of pilgrims come to the monastery in the hope of healing and receiving grace.

The feast day of the Theotokos of Pochayiv icon is celebrated on 23 July, either on the Gregorian calendar (23 July N.S.) or on the Julian calendar (23 July O.S., 5 August N.S.).
