= Ivan Khvorostetskyi =

Ukrainian painter (1888–1958)

- Іван Федорович Хворостецький
- Born: 6 April 1888; Yurydyky, now part of Pochaiv, Kremenets Raion, Ternopil Oblast, Ukraine
- Died: 19 November 1958 (aged 70); Pochaiv, now Kremenets Raion, Ternopil Oblast, Ukraine
- Education: Kyiv Art School, Kyiv Art Institute
- Occupation: Painter

Ivan Khvorostetskyi (Ukrainian: Іван Федорович Хворостецький; 6 (18) April 1888 – 19 November 1958) was a Ukrainian painter. Member of the Union of Artists of Ukraine (1949).

== Biography ==
Ivan Khvorostetskyi was born on 6 (18) April 1888 in the village of Yurydyky, which is now part of Pochaiv in the Kremenets Raion of Ternopil Oblast.

He received his first art education at the icon painting school of the Pochaiv Lavra (teacher Andronyk Lazarchuk). In 1915, he graduated from the Kyiv Art School (his teachers were artists Oleksandr Murashko and Fedir Krychevskyi), and in 1928, he graduated from the Kyiv Art Institute, where he began working as an assistant in 1935 and as an docent in 1940. From 1929 to 1934, he also taught at the Kyiv Art Technical School, and from 1932 to 1936, he taught at the Kyiv Engineering and Construction Institute. In 1936, he headed the fine arts studio, which operated in the Palace of Pioneers in Kyiv.

== Creativity ==
Khvorostetskyi was recognized as a master of lyrical landscapes and genre paintings. His works are restrained, with deep and expressive colors and impeccable taste. He painted churches in the Pustovity (now Kremenchuk Raion) and the cathedral in Bila Tserkva (Kyiv Oblast). Khvorostetskyi's icon paintings suffered a tragic fate: they were destroyed by the Soviet authorities, and later his other paintings were burned during World War II. In 1943, he returned to Pochaiv, where in 1952 he began to create inspired but hurried works, which manifested themselves in the sketchiness of his creative manner.

In 1927, he began exhibiting his works at national and international exhibitions. In 1928, in Venice, he presented the painting "Prali" ("Laundresses") at an exhibition, which was recognized as the best work. Solo exhibitions were held in Kyiv (1937, 1948, 1954, 1957, 1959, 1973), Lviv (1955), Ternopil (1955, 1963, 2003), Kremenets (1955–1956, 1969), Pochaiv (1957, 1978), Kherson (1976), and elsewhere. Some of his works are kept in the collections of the National Art Museum of Ukraine in Kyiv, the Ternopil Art and Local History Museums, and the Kremenets Local History Museum.

Among the important works: "Ostanniy snih" (1945), "Zyma" (1947, 1952), "Pasika" (1949, 1957), "Malvy" (1954), "Ozero v Ternopoli" (1955), "Zamkova hora v Kremenetsi" (1956), "Zyma v Kremenetsi" (1957), "Kopytsi", "Pochaivsʹkyi motyv" (both — 1958).

== Honouring ==
In 1968, a memorial plaque to Khvorostetskyi was installed on the facade of the artist's family home. In 1989, the Khvorostetskyi Art and Memorial Museum was founded, which is currently operating in Pochaiv.

== Bibliography ==
- Павлов В. Іван Хворостецький. Життя та творчість. Спогади сучасників. — К.: Мистецтво, 1981.
- Енциклопедія українознавства : Словникова частина : [в 11 т.] / Наукове товариство імені Шевченка ; гол. ред. проф., д-р Володимир Кубійович. — Париж — Нью-Йорк : Молоде життя, 1955–1995. — ISBN 5-7707-4049-3. — Том 9. — С. 3577.
- Мистецтво України : Біографічний довідник. / упоряд.: А. В. Кудрицький, М. Г. Лабінський ; за ред. А. В. Кудрицького. — Київ : «Українська енциклопедія» імені М. П. Бажана, 1997. — С. 700 с. . — ISBN 5-88500-071-9.. — С. 614.
