= Chapel of Saint Pavel of Taganrog =

Chapel in Taganrog, Rostov Oblast, Russia

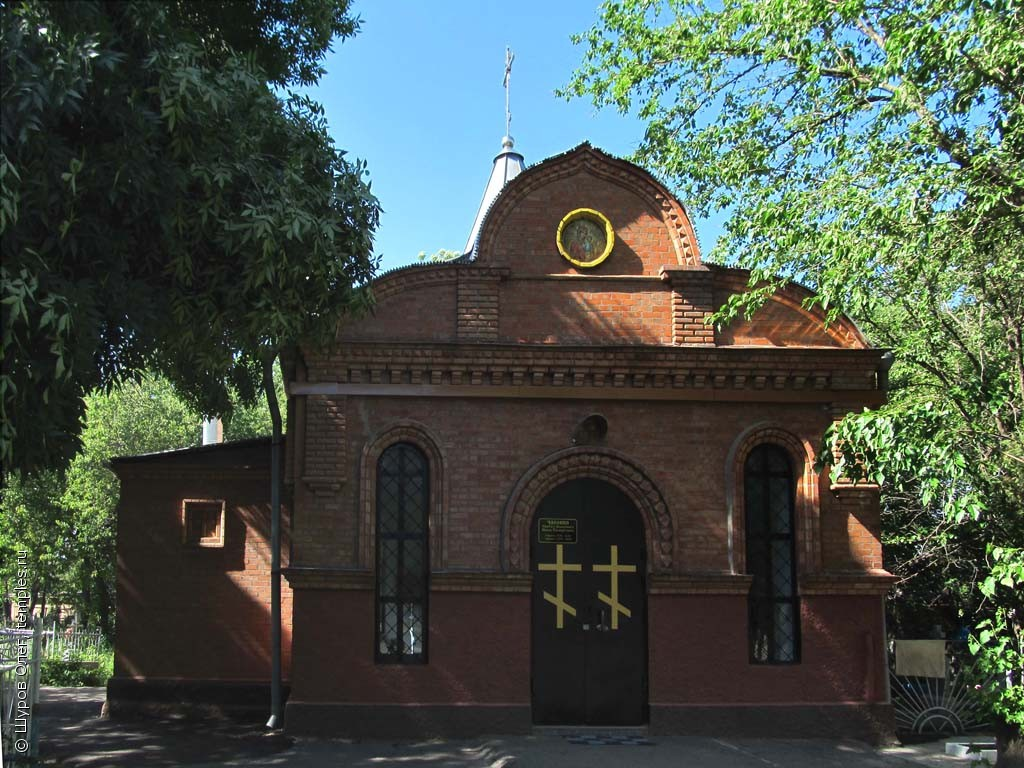

- Location within Russia

Religion
- Affiliation: Russian Orthodox

Location
- Location: Taganrog, Russia
- Interactive map of Chapel of Saint Pavel of Taganrog
- Coordinates: 47.206831°N 38.904086°E

Architecture
- Architect: novice Maria Velichko
- Completed: 1905

The Chapel of Saint Pavel of Taganrog (Russian: Часовня Павла Таганрогского) is a place of worship, which is located at Street Lagerny, 2, in Taganrog, Rostov Region. The chapel was first erected in 1905 at the burial place of Pavel Pavlovich Stozhkov. The religious denomination of the chapel is orthodox.

== History ==
At the old cemetery of Taganrog there is a place where Pavel Taganrogskiy is buried. For the protection and preservation of his grave, in 1905 was built a wooden chapel. The wooden chapel was burned down on 12 July 1912.

The novice Maria Velichko bustled about building a new stone chapel, which was approved in 1913. The chapel was built, and it was consecrated on 29 June 1914. The church was crowned with 5 domes. Inside it was a marble iconostasis, aged in the Greek-Byzantine style. The cost of building of the chapel was 20 thousand rubles. The money was collected through donations. In 1925, the chapel was destroyed and revived again in 1995 with the help of private donations. Now it is a rectangular construction in plan with small tent dome.
