= Chapel of Our Lady of Kazan, Taganrog =

Orthodox chapel in Rostov Oblast, Russia

Chapel of Our Lady of Kazan
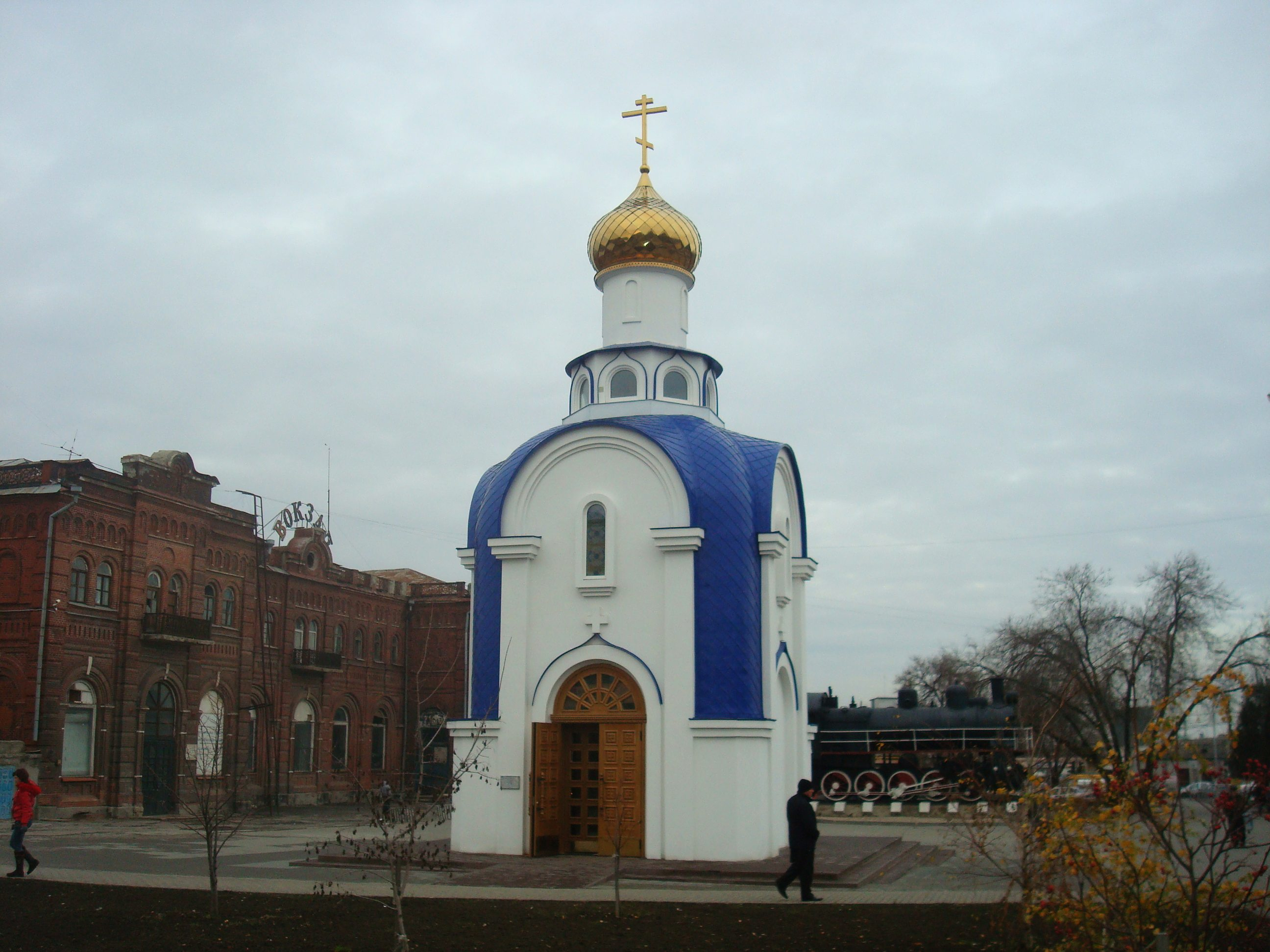

- Location within Russia

Religion
- Affiliation: Russian Orthodox

Location
- Location: Taganrog, Rostov Oblast, Russia
- Coordinates: 47.2208°N 38.9147°E

Architecture
- Architect: Vladimir Elitenko
- Completed: 2012

Chapel of Our Lady of Kazan is an Orthodox chapel in Taganrog. It was built in the area of the Rebellion Square, in front of the Old Train Station, in 2012.

== History ==
The old chapel was built in 1908 on the territory of Taganrog Old Train Station to celebrate the birth of Grand Duke Alexei Nikolaevich. This chapel was destroyed in the 1920s.

New chapel was planned to be built on the square in front of the station, close to "Locomotive" monument, which was dedicated to revolutionary events in Taganrog.

Commemorating these events was one of the reasons for the decision to dedicate the chapel to Our Lady of Kazan, whose feast day is 4 November, which is also a public holiday, National Unity Day.

Chapel of Our Lady of Kazan was built on the initiative of Archpriest Alexei Lysikov with the financial support of the president of "Lemax" company Leonid Matusevich.

The symbolic laying of a stone at the construction site of the chapel took place on 24 May 2011. The ceremony was attended by Taganrog mayor Nikolai Fedyanin.

On July 21, 2012 a dome was solemnly hoisted on the chapel.

Chapel of Our Lady of Kazan was built on project of Taganrog designer Vladimir Elitenko. The iconostasis of the chapel was made by masters from Palekh.

Northern and southern walls of the chapel are decorated with bas-reliefs with images of the Virgin Mary and Saint Nicholas (Nicholas of Mozhaisk). Taganrog sculptor Vladimir Dmitriev worked on this decoration for six months. Temple painting was done by artist Natalia Krasnovskaya, and stained glass windows were made by Mikhail Abramenko.

Chapel Our Lady of Kazan was consecrated on November 19, 2012 by Metropolitan of Rostov and Novocherkassk Mercuriy, on the 220th anniversary of the birth of Saint Paul of Taganrog.
