= Kelya of Saint Pavel of Taganrog =

Coordinates: 47.2024°N 38.9288°E

House (kelya) of Saint Pavel of Taganrog
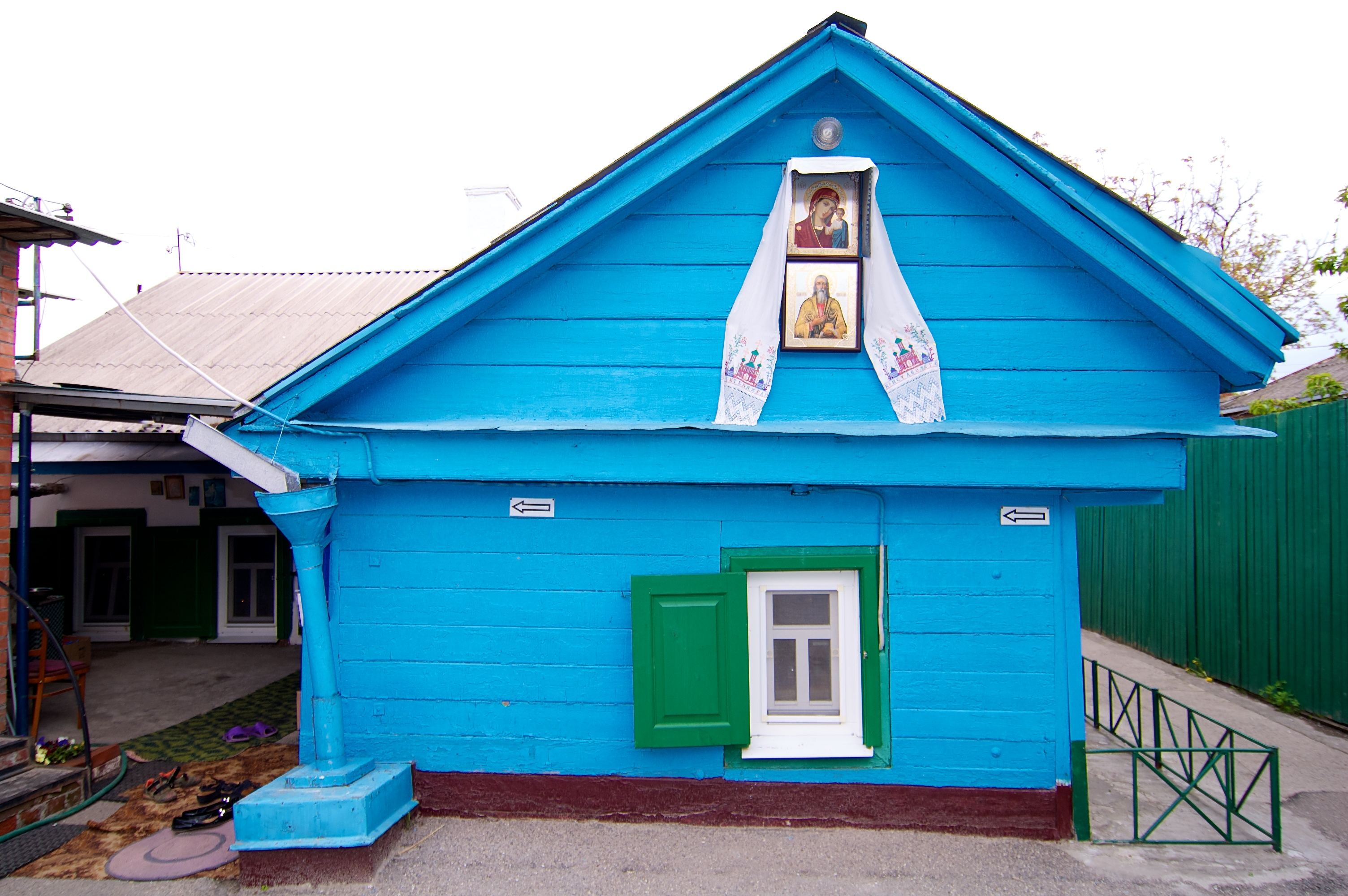

Religion
- Affiliation: Russian Orthodox
- Province: Rostov Oblast
- Ecclesiastical or organizational status: most holy site
- Status: active

Location
- Location: Taganrog, Russia
- Municipality: Taganrog
- Interactive map of House (kelya) of Saint Pavel of Taganrog

The House or Kelya of The Blessed starets Saint Pavel of Taganrog is situated in the city of Taganrog on Turgenevsky Street 82 not far from The Saint Nicholas the Wonderworker Church and open to Russian Orthodox pilgrims.

Pavel of Taganrog spent about half of his Taganrog years in this house, which is commonly referred to as Kelya of Saint Starets Pavel of Taganrog. The house has never been renovated and the walls, icons, earthenware, tables and benches are all witnesses to the epoch. In the courtyard stands an old draw well, which is believed to be sanctified by John of Kronstadt.

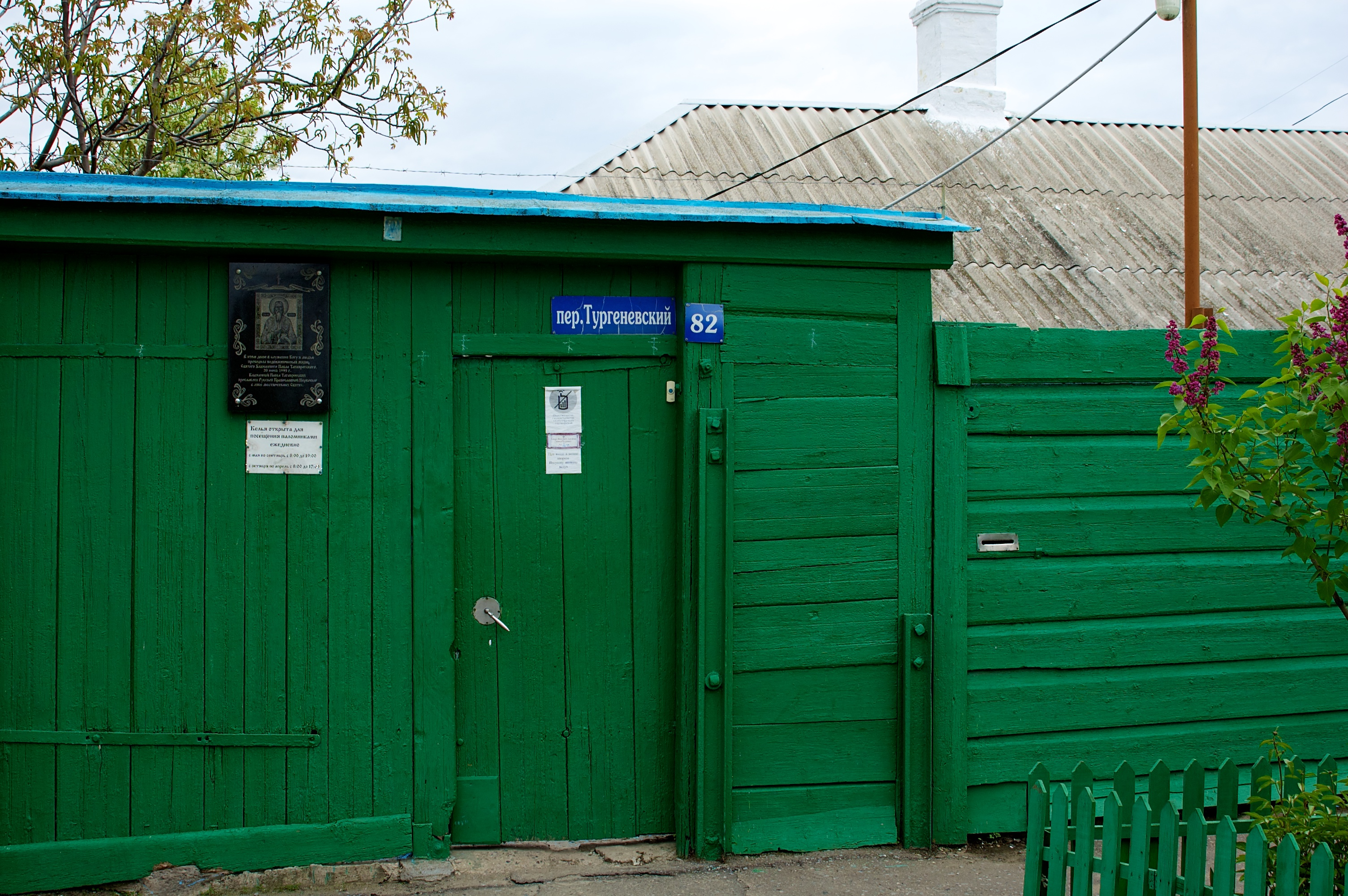
The wicket gate to kelya on Turgenev Street 82

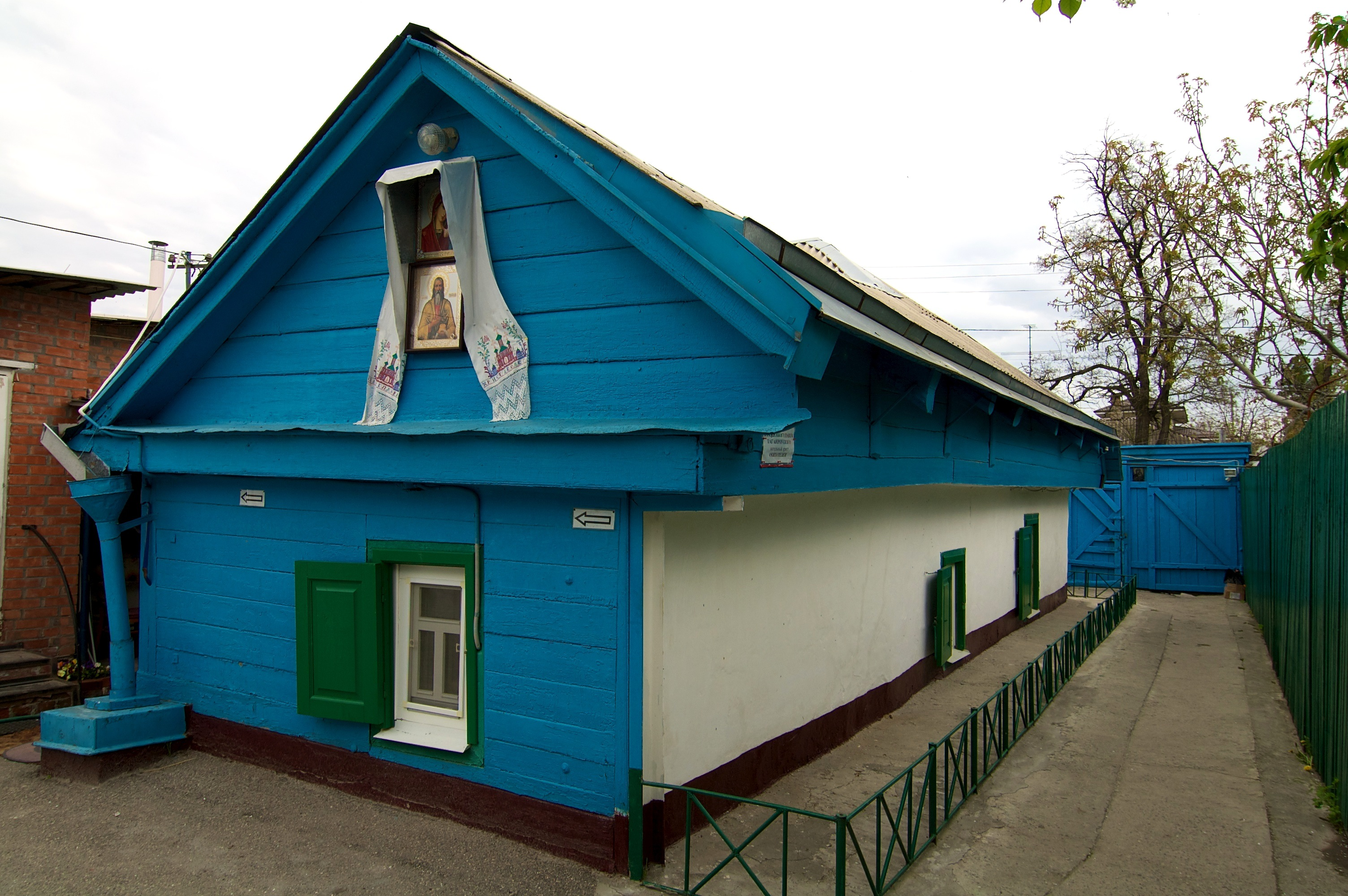
Kelya of Saint Pavel

== External links and references ==
- Encyclopedia of Taganrog, Anton Edition, Taganrog, 2008
