= Budky, Ternopil Oblast =

Rural locality in Ternopil Oblast, Ukraine

Budky Будки
- Interactive map of Budky
- Location in Ternopil Oblast Budky (Ternopil Oblast)
- Coordinates: 50°2′23″N 25°26′51″E
- Country: Ukraine
- Oblast: Ternopil Oblast
- Raion: Kremenets Raion
- Hromada: Pochaiv urban hromada

Population (2001)
  - Total: 1,091
- Time zone: UTC+2 (EET)
  - Summer (DST): UTC+3 (EEST)
- Postal code: 47024

Budky (Ukrainian: Будки) is a village in Ukraine, Ternopil Oblast, Kremenets Raion, Pochaiv urban hromada. After the liquidation of the Kremenets Raion (1940–2020) on 19 July 2020, the village became part of the Kremenets Raion.

== Bibliography ==
- (in Ukrainian) В. Уніят., Будки // Ternopil Encyclopedic Dictionary: in 4 v. / editorial board: H. Yavorskyi and other, Ternopil: "Zbruch", 2004, V. 1: А—Й, S. 194-195. — ISBN 966-528-197-6.
- "Budki 3.), wś, pow. krzemieniecki". Geographical Dictionary of the Kingdom of Poland (in Polish). p. 259.
