= Pochaiv urban hromada =

Urban hromada in Ternopil Oblast, Ukraine

Pochaiv urban hromada Почаївська міська громада
- hromada
- Location within Ternopil Oblast Location within Ukraine
- Coordinates: 50°0′23″N 25°30′37″E
- Country: Ukraine
- Oblast: Ternopil Oblast
- Raion: Kremenets Raion
- Administrative center: Pochaiv

Government
  - Hromada head: Vasyl Boiko

Area
  - Total: 218.3 km^{2} (84.3 sq mi)

Population (2022)
  - Total: 17,704
- City: 1
- Villages: 11
- Website: pochaiv-rada.gov.ua

Pochaiv urban territorial hromada (Ukrainian: Почаївська територіальна громада, romanized: Pochaivska miska terytorialna hromada) is a hromada in Ukraine, in Kremenets Raion of Ternopil Oblast. The administrative center is the city of Pochaiv. Its population is 17,704 (2022 estimate) It was formed on 7 August 2015.

== Settlements ==
The hromada consists of 1 city (Pochaiv) and 11 villages:

- Borshchivka
- Budky
- Valihury
- Zatyshshia
- Komaryn
- Komarivka
- Lidykhiv
- Losiatyn
- Rydomyl
- Staryi Pochaiv
- Staryi Tarazh
