= Rydomyl =

Rural locality in Ternopil Oblast, Ukraine

Rydomyl Ридомиль
- Interactive map of Rydomyl
- Location in Ternopil Oblast Rydomyl (Ternopil Oblast)
- Coordinates: 49°54′49″N 25°35′56″E
- Country: Ukraine
- Oblast: Ternopil Oblast
- Raion: Kremenets Raion
- Hromada: Pochaiv urban hromada

Population (2014)
  - Total: 1,630
- Time zone: UTC+2 (EET)
  - Summer (DST): UTC+3 (EEST)
- Postal code: 47060

Rydomyl (Ukrainian: Ридомиль) is a village in Ukraine, Ternopil Oblast, Kremenets Raion, Pochaiv urban hromada. After the liquidation of the Kremenets Raion (1940–2020) on 19 July 2020, the village became part of the Kremenets Raion.

== Bibliography ==
- "Rydoml". Geographical Dictionary of the Kingdom of Poland (in Polish). 10. Warszawa: Kasa im. Józefa Mianowskiego. 1889. p. 83.
