= Losiatyn, Ternopil Oblast =

Rural locality in Ternopil Oblast, Ukraine

Losiatyn Лосятин
- Interactive map of Losiatyn
- Location in Ternopil Oblast Losiatyn (Ternopil Oblast)
- Coordinates: 49°58′16″N 25°29′23″E
- Country: Ukraine
- Oblast: Ternopil Oblast
- Raion: Kremenets Raion
- Hromada: Pochaiv urban hromada

Population (2001)
  - Total: 1,519
- Time zone: UTC+2 (EET)
  - Summer (DST): UTC+3 (EEST)
- Postal code: 47052

Losiatyn (Ukrainian: Лосятин) is a village in Ukraine, Ternopil Oblast, Kremenets Raion, Pochaiv urban hromada. After the liquidation of the Kremenets Raion (1940–2020) on 19 July 2020, the village became part of the Kremenets Raion.

== Bibliography ==
- (in Ukrainian) В. Уніят, Б. Хаварівський., Лосятин // Ternopil Encyclopedic Dictionary: in 4 v. / editorial board: H. Yavorskyi and other, Ternopil: "Zbruch", 2005, V. 2: К—О, S. 393. — ISBN 966-528-199-2.
- "Łosiatyn(2)". Geographical Dictionary of the Kingdom of Poland (in Polish). p. 273.
