= Komarivka, Kremenets Raion, Ternopil Oblast =

Rural locality in Ternopil Oblast, Ukraine

Komarivka Комарівка
- Interactive map of Komarivka
- Location in Ternopil Oblast Komarivka (Ternopil Oblast)
- Coordinates: 50°4′4″N 25°29′32″E
- Country: Ukraine
- Oblast: Ternopil Oblast
- Raion: Kremenets Raion
- Hromada: Pochaiv urban hromada

Population (2003)
  - Total: 908
- Time zone: UTC+2 (EET)
  - Summer (DST): UTC+3 (EEST)
- Postal code: 47022

Komarivka (Ukrainian: Комарівка) is a village in Ukraine, Ternopil Oblast, Kremenets Raion, Pochaiv urban hromada. After the liquidation of the Kremenets Raion (1940–2020) on 19 July 2020, the village became part of the Kremenets Raion.
