= Zatyshshia, Ternopil Oblast =

Rural locality in Ternopil Oblast, Ukraine

Zatyshshia Затишшя
- Interactive map of Zatyshshia
- Location in Ternopil Oblast Zatyshshia (Ternopil Oblast)
- Coordinates: 50°1′35″N 25°32′56″E
- Country: Ukraine
- Oblast: Ternopil Oblast
- Raion: Kremenets Raion
- Hromada: Pochaiv urban hromada

Population (2001)
  - Total: 295
- Time zone: UTC+2 (EET)
  - Summer (DST): UTC+3 (EEST)
- Postal code: 47025

Zatyshshia (Ukrainian: Затишшя) is a village in Ukraine, Ternopil Oblast, Kremenets Raion, Pochaiv urban hromada. After the liquidation of the Kremenets Raion (1940–2020) on 19 July 2020, the village became part of the Kremenets Raion.
