= Komaryn =

Rural locality in Ternopil Oblast, Ukraine

Komaryn Комарин
- Interactive map of Komaryn
- Location in Ternopil Oblast Komaryn (Ternopil Oblast)
- Coordinates: 49°58′48″N 25°36′37″E
- Country: Ukraine
- Oblast: Ternopil Oblast
- Raion: Kremenets Raion
- Hromada: Pochaiv urban hromada

Population (2015)
  - Total: 415
- Time zone: UTC+2 (EET)
  - Summer (DST): UTC+3 (EEST)
- Postal code: 47074

Komaryn (Ukrainian: Комарин) is a village in Ukraine, Ternopil Oblast, Kremenets Raion, Pochaiv urban hromada. After the liquidation of the Kremenets Raion (1940–2020) on 19 July 2020, the village became part of the Kremenets Raion.

== Bibliography ==
- "Komaryn (pow. krzemieniecki)". Geographical Dictionary of the Kingdom of Poland (in Polish). p. 110.
