= Lidykhiv =

Rural locality in Ternopil Oblast, Ukraine

Lidykhiv Лідихів
- Interactive map of Lidykhiv
- Location in Ternopil Oblast Lidykhiv (Ternopil Oblast)
- Coordinates: 50°1′3″N 25°23′49″E
- Country: Ukraine
- Oblast: Ternopil Oblast
- Raion: Kremenets Raion
- Hromada: Pochaiv urban hromada

Population (2001)
  - Total: 2,372
- Time zone: UTC+2 (EET)
  - Summer (DST): UTC+3 (EEST)
- Postal code: 47022

Lidykhiv (Ukrainian: Лідихів) is a village in Ukraine, Ternopil Oblast, Kremenets Raion, Pochaiv urban hromada. After the liquidation of the Kremenets Raion (1940–2020) on 19 July 2020, the village became part of the Kremenets Raion.

== Bibliography ==
- (in Ukrainian) Клименко О., Хаварівський Б., Лідихів // Ternopil Encyclopedic Dictionary: in 4 v. / editorial board: H. Yavorskyi and other, Ternopil: "Zbruch", 2005, V. 2: К—О, S. 371. — ISBN 966-528-199-2.
- "Ledóchów". Geographical Dictionary of the Kingdom of Poland (in Polish). 5. Warszawa: Kasa im. Józefa Mianowskiego. 1884. p. 121.
