= Staryi Tarazh =

Rural locality in Ternopil Oblast, Ukraine

Staryi Tarazh Старий Тараж
- Interactive map of Staryi Tarazh
- Location in Ternopil Oblast Staryi Tarazh (Ternopil Oblast)
- Coordinates: 49°58′53″N 25°34′30″E
- Country: Ukraine
- Oblast: Ternopil Oblast
- Raion: Kremenets Raion
- Hromada: Pochaiv urban hromada

Population (2007)
  - Total: 1,046
- Time zone: UTC+2 (EET)
  - Summer (DST): UTC+3 (EEST)
- Postal code: 47051

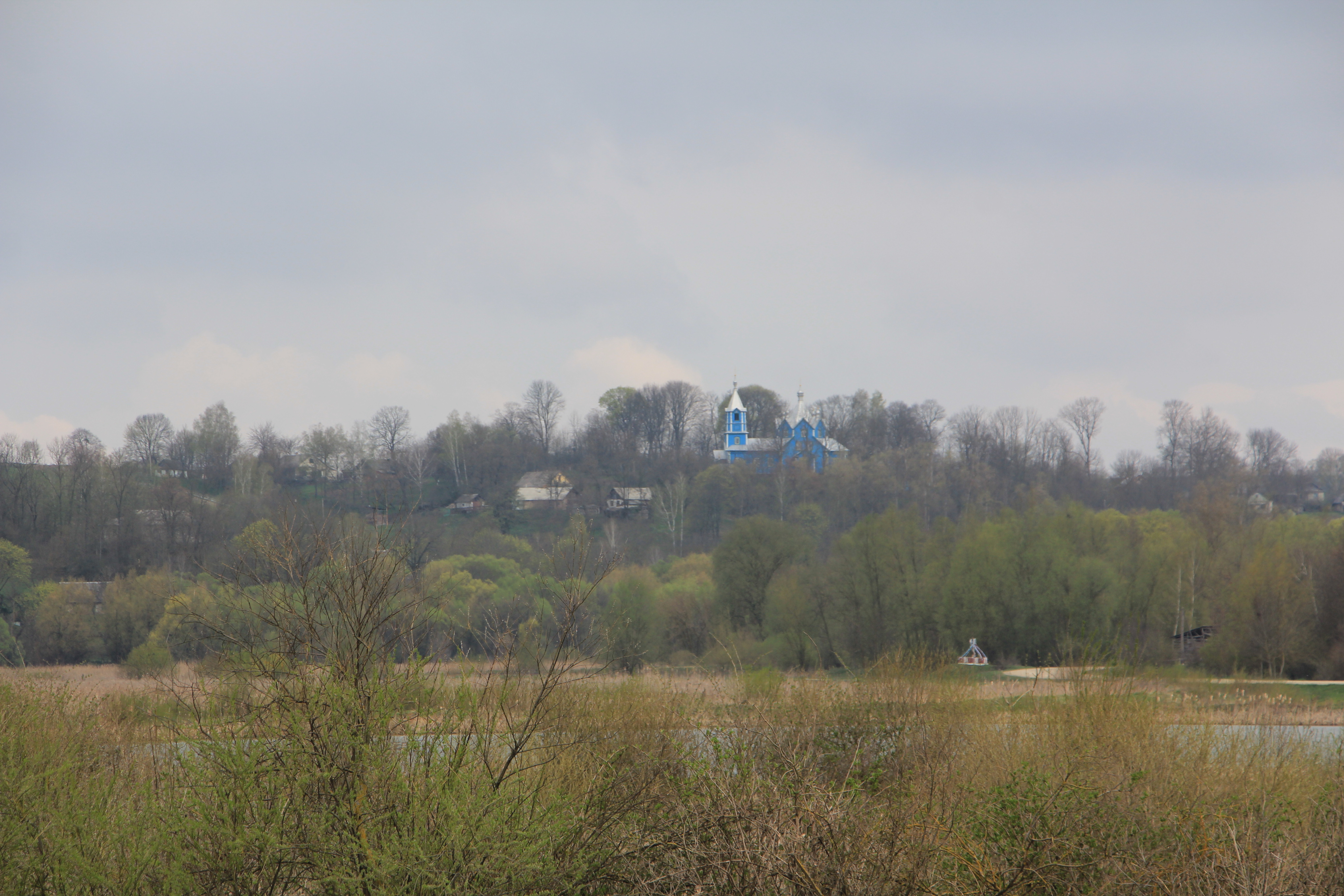
The village of Stary Tarazh, Kremenets district, Ternopil region

Staryi Tarazh (Ukrainian: Старий Тараж) is a village in Ukraine, Ternopil Oblast, Kremenets Raion, Pochaiv urban hromada. After the liquidation of the Kremenets Raion (1940–2020) on 19 July 2020, the village became part of the Kremenets Raion.

== Bibliography ==
- (in Ukrainian) Басюк Г., Бігус М., Старий Тараж // Ternopil Encyclopedic Dictionary: in 4 v. / editorial board: H. Yavorskyi and other, Ternopil: "Zbruch", 2008, V. 3: П—Я, S. 334. — ISBN 978-966-528-279-2.
- "Taraż Nowy i Stary". Geographical Dictionary of the Kingdom of Poland (in Polish). 12. Warszawa: Kasa im. Józefa Mianowskiego. 1892. p. 163.
