= Valihury =

Rural locality in Ternopil Oblast, Ukraine

Valihury Валігури
- Interactive map of Valihury
- Location in Ternopil Oblast Valihury (Ternopil Oblast)
- Coordinates: 50°3′58″N 25°26′51″E
- Country: Ukraine
- Oblast: Ternopil Oblast
- Raion: Kremenets Raion
- Hromada: Pochaiv urban hromada

Population (2003)
  - Total: 248
- Time zone: UTC+2 (EET)
  - Summer (DST): UTC+3 (EEST)
- Postal code: 47024

Valihury (Ukrainian: Валігури) is a village in Ukraine, Ternopil Oblast, Kremenets Raion, Pochaiv urban hromada. After the liquidation of the Kremenets Raion (1940–2020) on 19 July 2020, the village became part of the Kremenets Raion.

== Bibliography ==
- "Waligóry". Geographical Dictionary of the Kingdom of Poland (in Polish). p. 677.
