= Amphilochius of Pochayiv =

Ukrainian Orthodox saint

Saint Amphilochius of Pochayiv
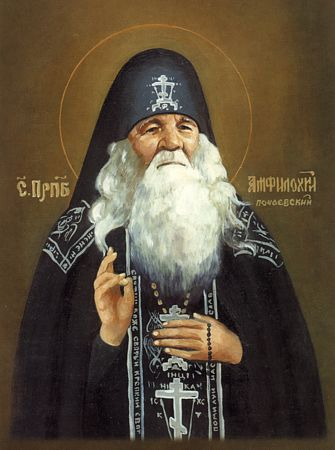
- Icon of Saint Amphilochius

Venerable
- Born: 27 November 1894; Mala Ilovitsia
- Died: 1 January 1971 (aged 76)
- Venerated in: Eastern Orthodox Church
- Canonized: 23 April 2002
- Feast: 29 April

Amphilochius of Pochayiv (Ukrainian: Амфілохій Почаївський) was a 20th-century Ukrainian Orthodox saint from Ternopil Oblast of western Ukraine.

== Early years ==
Amphilochius of Pochaiv was born Yakov Varnavovich Golovatyuk on 27 November 1894 in the village of Mala Ilovytsia (Mala Ilowica in Polish), in Kremenets Raion of Ternopil Oblast in western Ukraine, at that time part of the Russian Empire. The village of Mala Ilovytsia is located in the Ilovetska valley, which is 7 km (4 mi) wide, and is surrounded by the Kremenets mountains. It is the northernmost village of Ternopil Oblast, off the main roads and surrounded by forested areas.

Yakov was one of 10 children. His father, Varnava, was an able craftsman, making shoe lasts and sleighs, and had a reputation as a skilled bone setter. Yakov often assisted his father in caring for people who came for help.

In 1912 he was drafted into the army of the Tsar. During the First World War he served in Lutsk and then in Tomsk, where he was a medical attendant at the hospital. Later he was posted to the front as a field medic. He was captured as a prisoner of war by the Austrians, and sent to the Alps, where for three years he worked for a farmer. Eventually he managed to flee.

== Joining Pochaiv Lavra ==
Having returned home, he intended to marry but his experiences during the war, drew him to religious life and the Pochaiv monastery. Yakiv went to the Uspens’ka (Dormition) Lavra in Pochaiv in 1925. He constructed sleighs and wheels, and sang in the choir, always in the spirit of humility and obedience. On 8 July 1932 he was tonsured a monk through postryh (clipping of hair ceremony) and took the name Joseph (Yosyp in Ukrainian). On 27 September 1936, he was ordained a hieromonk.

Amphilochius spent much time praying in front of the miraculous icons of Pochaiv. He was appointed the caretaker of the God's Mother's Foot. God's Mother's Foot is a rock footprint left after apparition of Virgin Mary in Pochaiv around 1240.

His earlier work with his father and experience as a medic during the war gave him some skill in healing, and many people came to the Lavra seeking his help. The Archimandrite Abbot of the monastery of the lavra blessed Hieromonk Joseph in this work and allowed him to settle in a small house near the cemetery of the monastery, so as not to disturb the other monks. There the venerable Amphilochius spent 20 years ministering to the sick. He was credited with the gift of healing.

The Soviet regime which seized power after the war wished to stem the constant stream of people seeking healing from the pious monk. Fr. Joseph resisted their attempts to close the Lavra, and was subsequently incarcerated in a psychiatric hospital where he was injected with drugs. Eventually, he was released through he good offices of Svetlana Alliluyeva, whom he had previously met. Upon his release the authorities forbade him to return to the Lavra and so he settled in his native Ilovytsia with his nephew, where for many years he continued to serve the people, frequently conducting a Moleben with the Blessing of the Waters in his yard. It was believed that God gifted him with the grace of prophecy and the performing of miracles.

One day, at the instigation of the local authorities, he was severely beaten and left in an icy swamp. When found, he was taken to the lavra, where, as they thought that he was dying, he was tonsured into the Great Schema and given the name Amphilochius, in honor of Holy Hierarch Amphilochius of Iconium. Amphilochius slowly recovered. As he did not have a residence permit to stay at the Lavra, he returned to the village and resumed his ministry of healing.

He died on 1 January 1971 at the age of seventy-six. On 23 April 2002, Pochaev Elder Schema-abbot Amphilochius was glorified as a saint.
