= Staryi Pochaiv =

Rural locality in Ternopil Oblast, Ukraine

Staryi Pochaiv Старий Почаїв
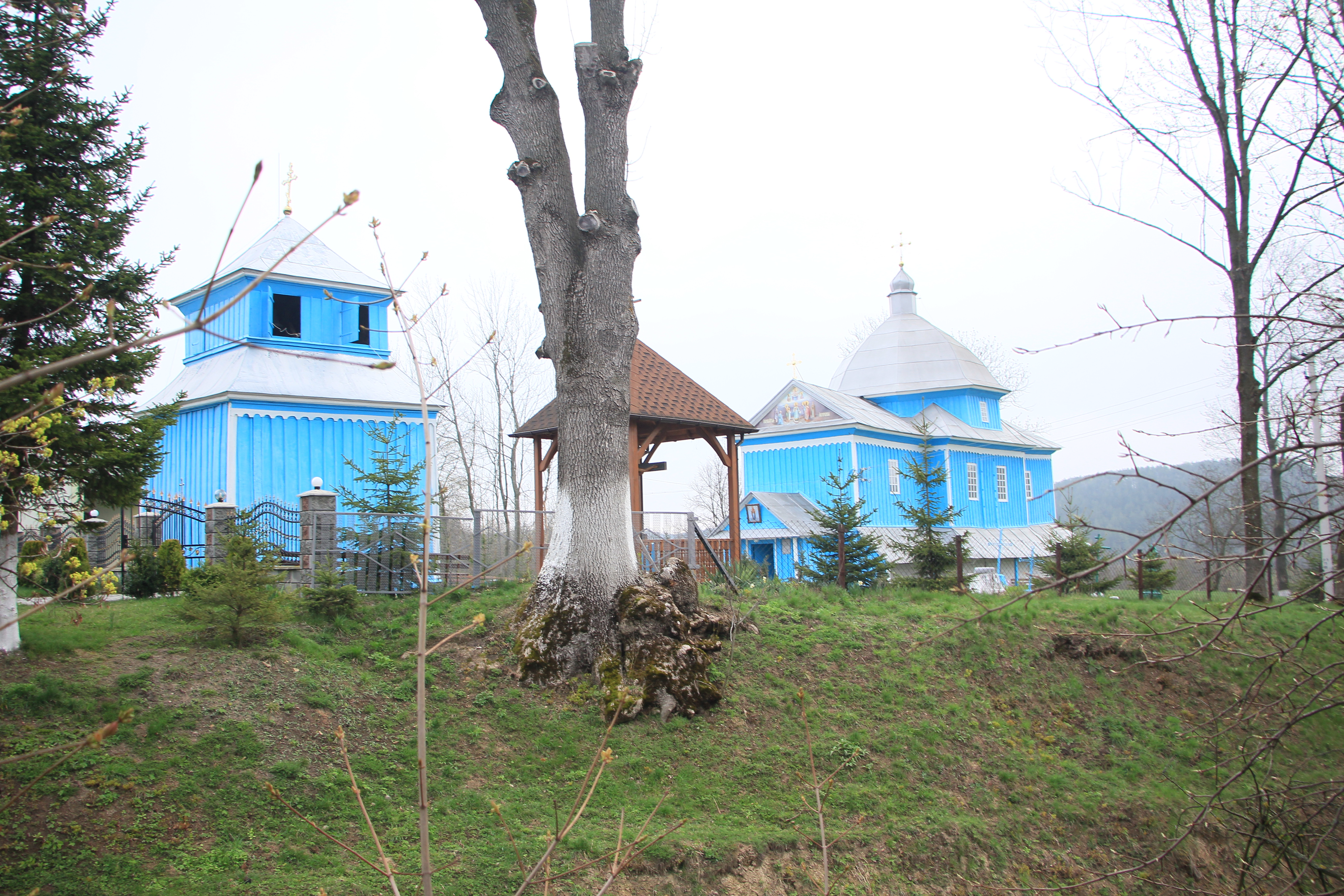
- Intercession Church

- Location in Ternopil Oblast
- Coordinates: 50°1′12″N 25°28′46″E
- Country: Ukraine
- Oblast: Ternopil Oblast
- Raion: Kremenets Raion
- Hromada: Pochaiv urban hromada
- Time zone: UTC+2 (EET)
  - Summer (DST): UTC+3 (EEST)
- Postal code: 47027

Staryi Pochaiv (Ukrainian: Старий Почаїв) is a village in Pochaiv urban hromada, Kremenets Raion, Ternopil Oblast, Ukraine.

== History ==
The first written mention of the village dates back to 1442.

== Religion ==
- The wooden Church of the Intercession (1643, rebuilt in 1746)
