= St. Nicholas Church, Taganrog =

Church in Taganrog, Russia

Coordinates: 47°12′06″N 38°56′26″E

Saint Nicholas Church
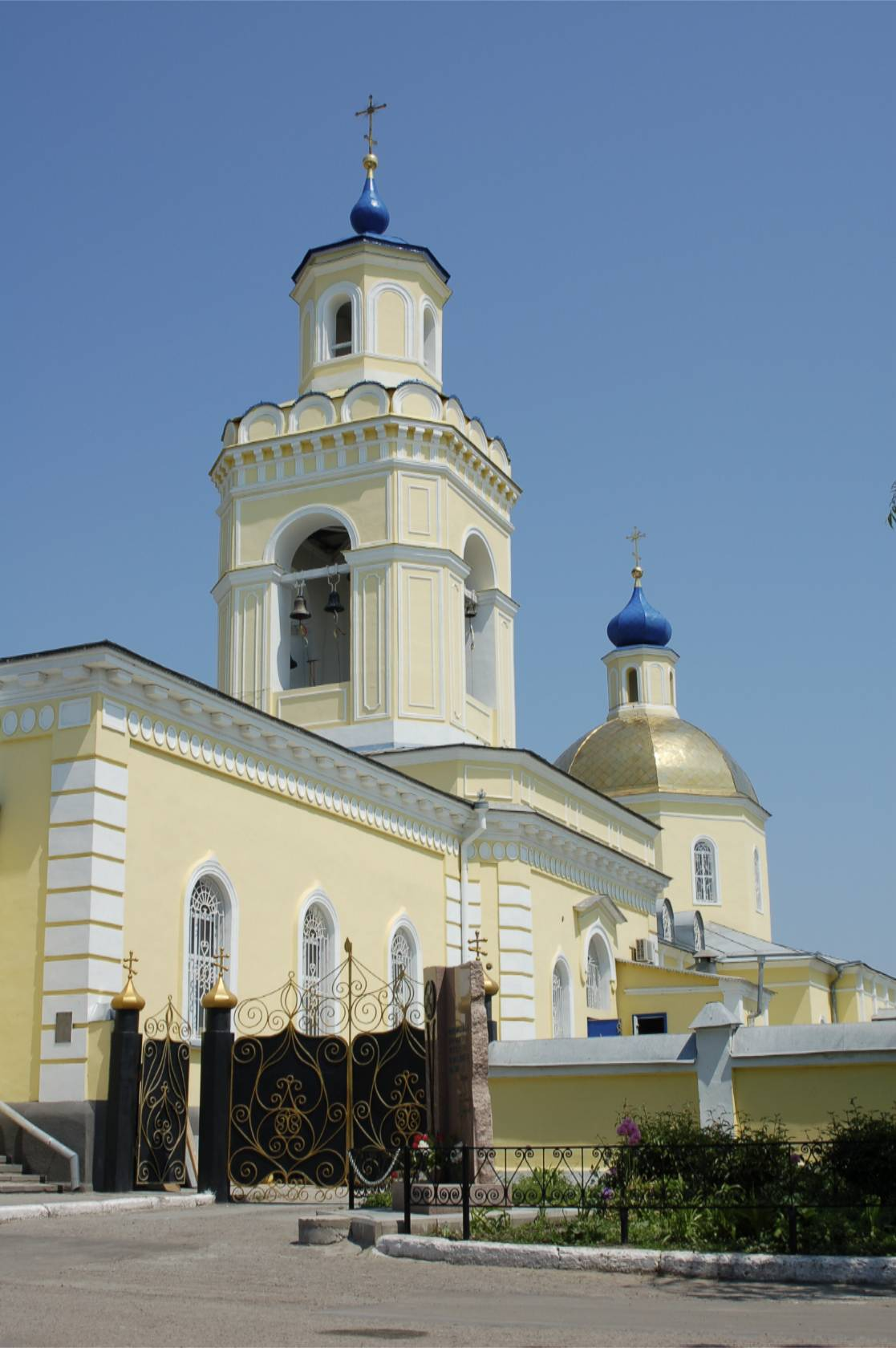
- The Saint Nicholas the Wonderworker Church (fronton)

Religion
- Affiliation: Russian Orthodox
- Ecclesiastical or organizational status: temple
- Year consecrated: 1778

Location
- Location: Taganrog, Russia
- Interactive map of Saint Nicholas Church

Architecture
- Type: Church
- Groundbreaking: 1777
- Completed: 1778

Website
- http://www.taganrog.orthodoxy.ru/index.php?id=39

The Saint Nicholas the Wonderworker Church is a Russian Orthodox Church in the city of Taganrog in Rostov Oblast, Russia.

== History ==
The Saint Nicholas Church is the oldest Russian Orthodox church in Taganrog. It was erected in 1778 at the request of rear-admiral Fedot Klokachev who commanded the Azov Flotilla, and was dedicated to Saint Nicholas, who is considered as the patron saint of all sailors.

In 1855, during the Siege of Taganrog, the building of the church was shelled by the British and French warships.

In 1941 the church was severely damaged during occupation of Taganrog, after the end of war it was not used and gradually deteriorated. It was reconstructed in the early 1990s.

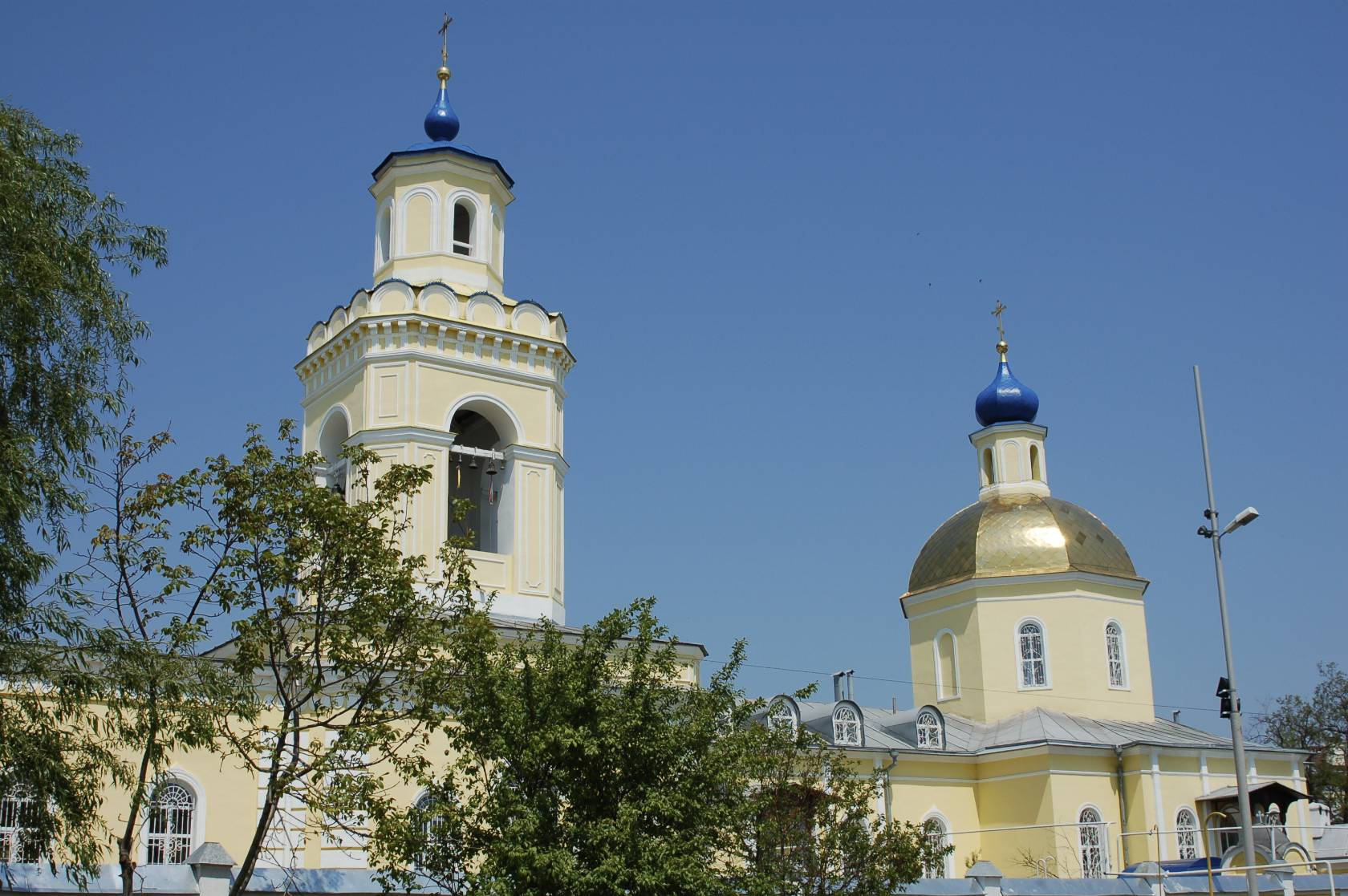
The Saint Nicholas the Wonderworker Church (view from the Krepostnoy Pereulok)

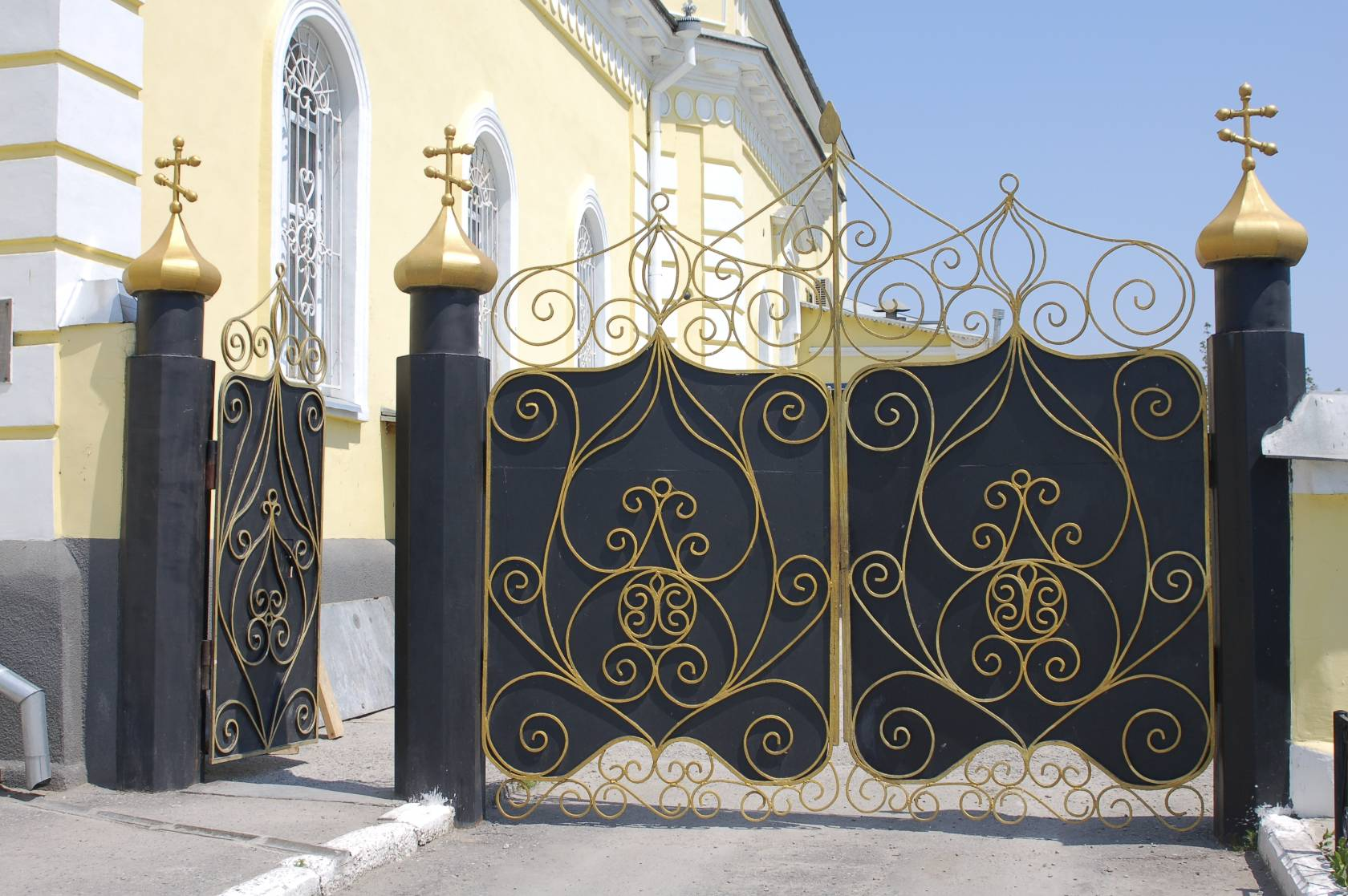
The gate, St.Nicholas Nicholas the Wonderworker Church

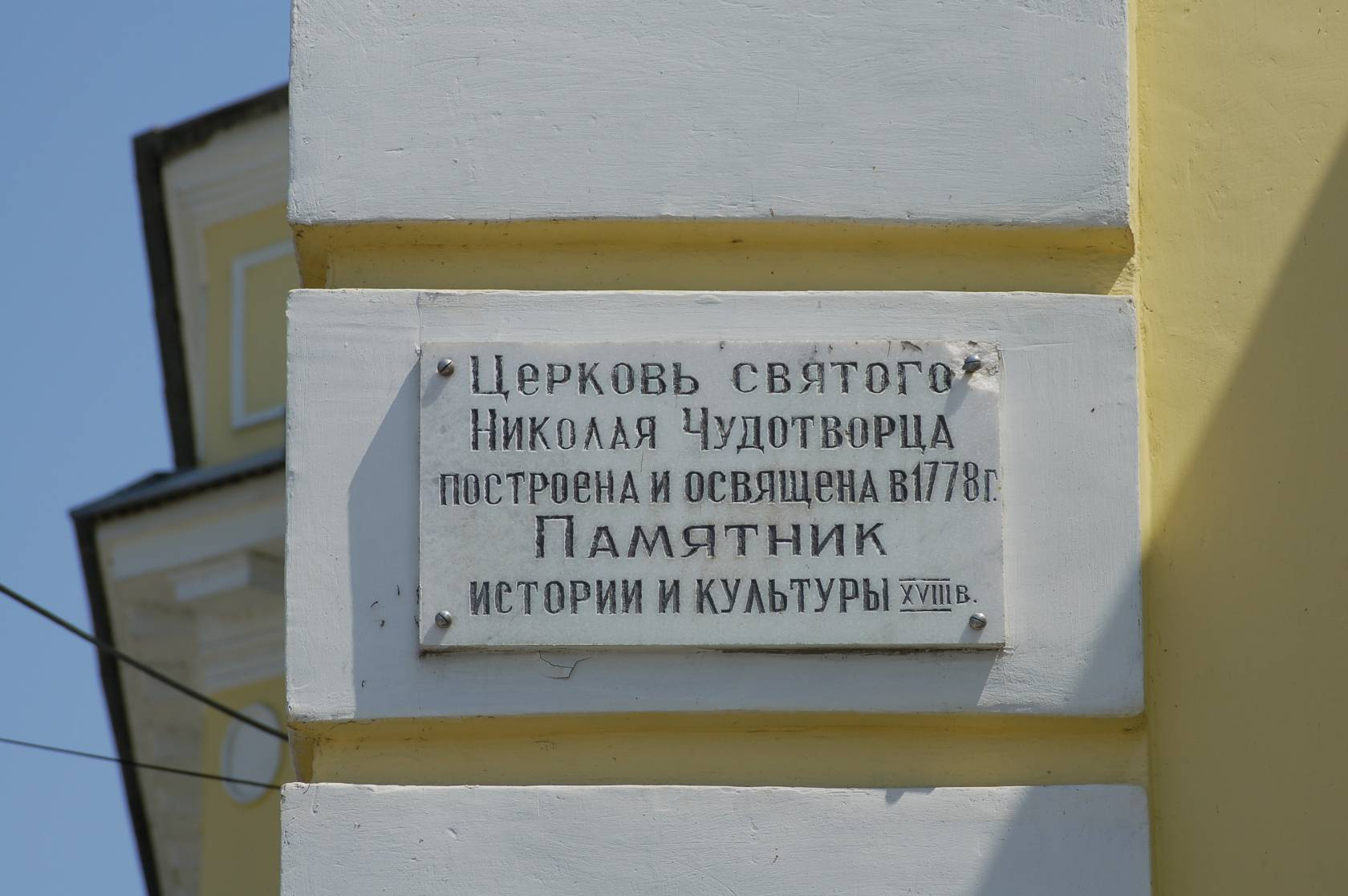
The plaque on the fronton of the church

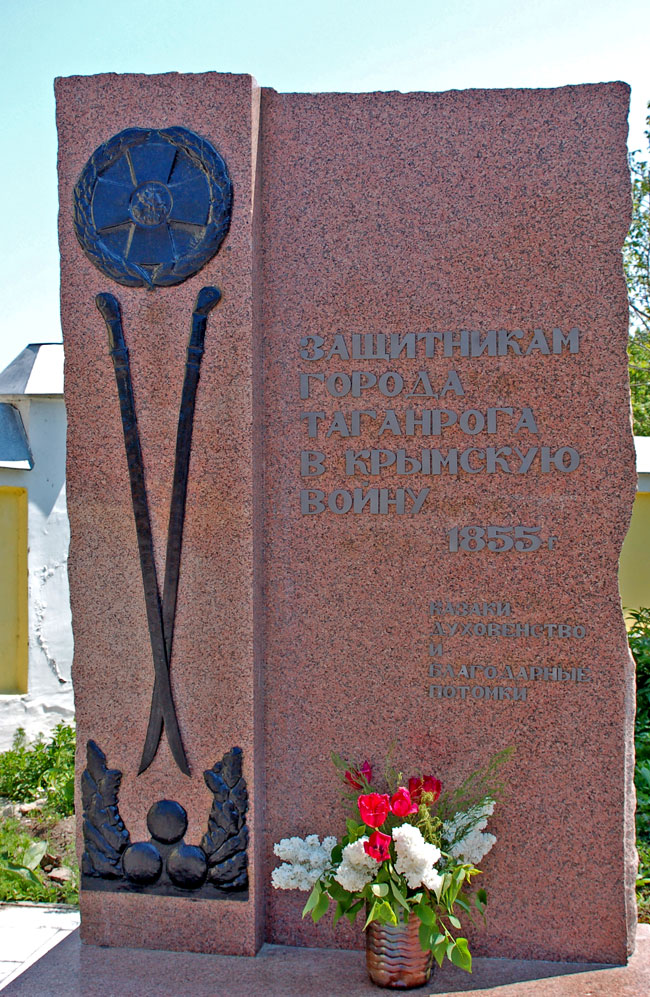
Monument to defenders of the city during the Siege of Taganrog.

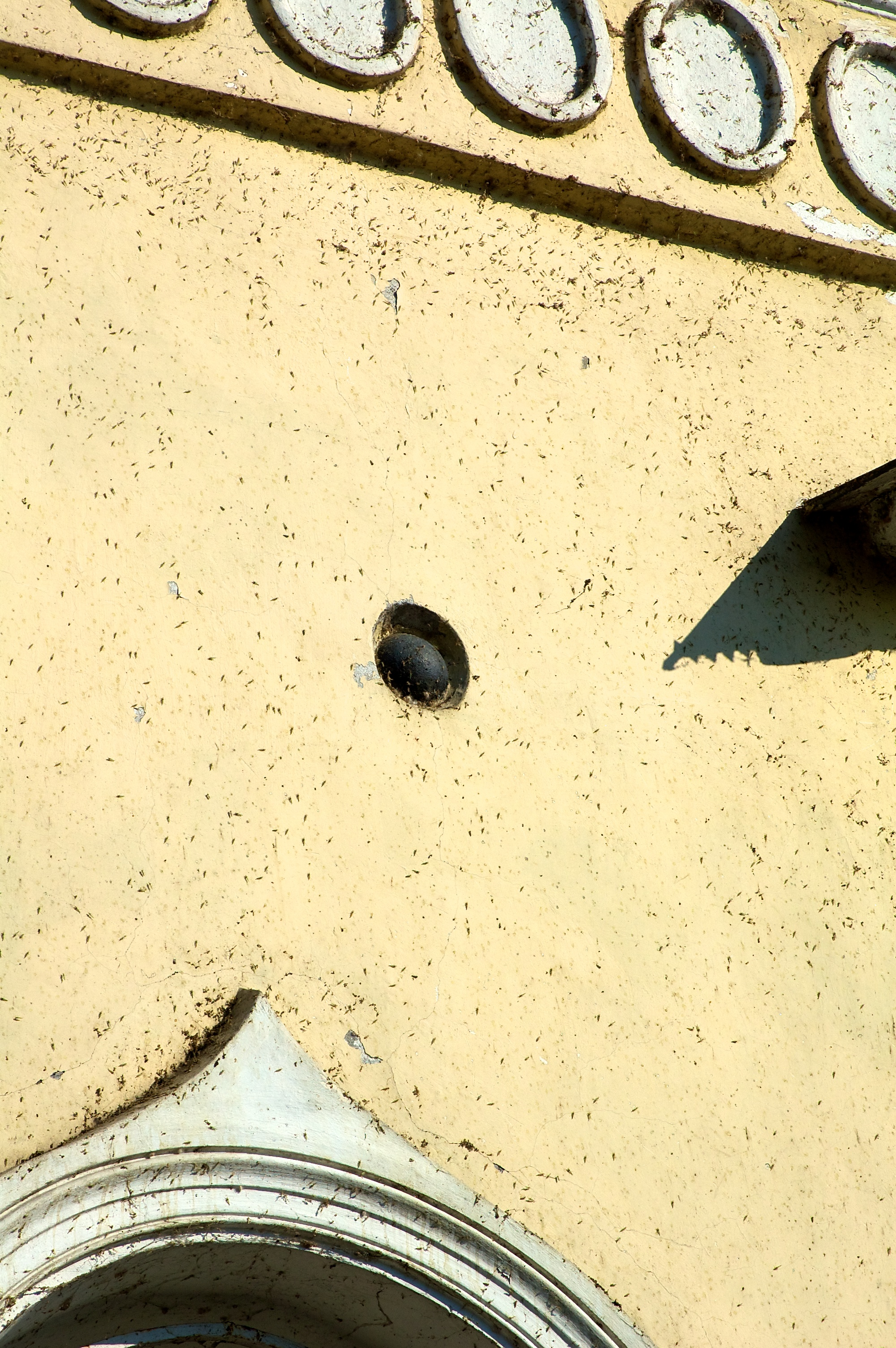
Cannonball in the church wall

== Canonization of Saint Pavel of Taganrog ==
On 20 June 1999 the Russian Orthodox Church canonized Blessed Pavel.

== The bell of Chersonesos ==
The bell of Chersonesos or "the fog bell of Chersonesos" is considered by many as "one of Taganrog's sights located abroad", which even became a symbol of another city - Sevastopol or to be more exact, the symbol of Chersonesos Taurica.

The fog bell was cast in 1778 from the trophy Turkish cannons seized by the Russian Imperial Army during Russo-Turkish War (1768–1774).

During the Crimean War the fog bell was seized by the French and was placed in the cathedral of Notre-Dame of Paris.

The monastery was closed in 1925 by the new authorities, and two years later all its bells were sent away to be recast. Only one bell escaped this sad fate because the Department of the Security of Navigation of the Black and Azov Seas proposed to place it on the coast as a signal fog bell. In this quality the bell served until the 1960s.

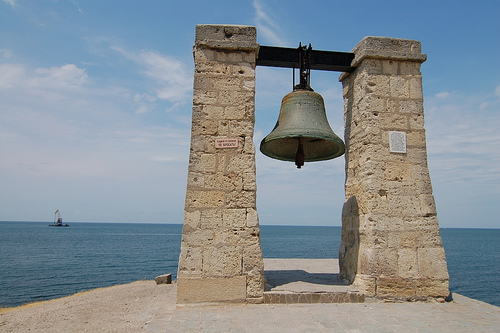
The bell of Chersonesos, view on the Black Sea.

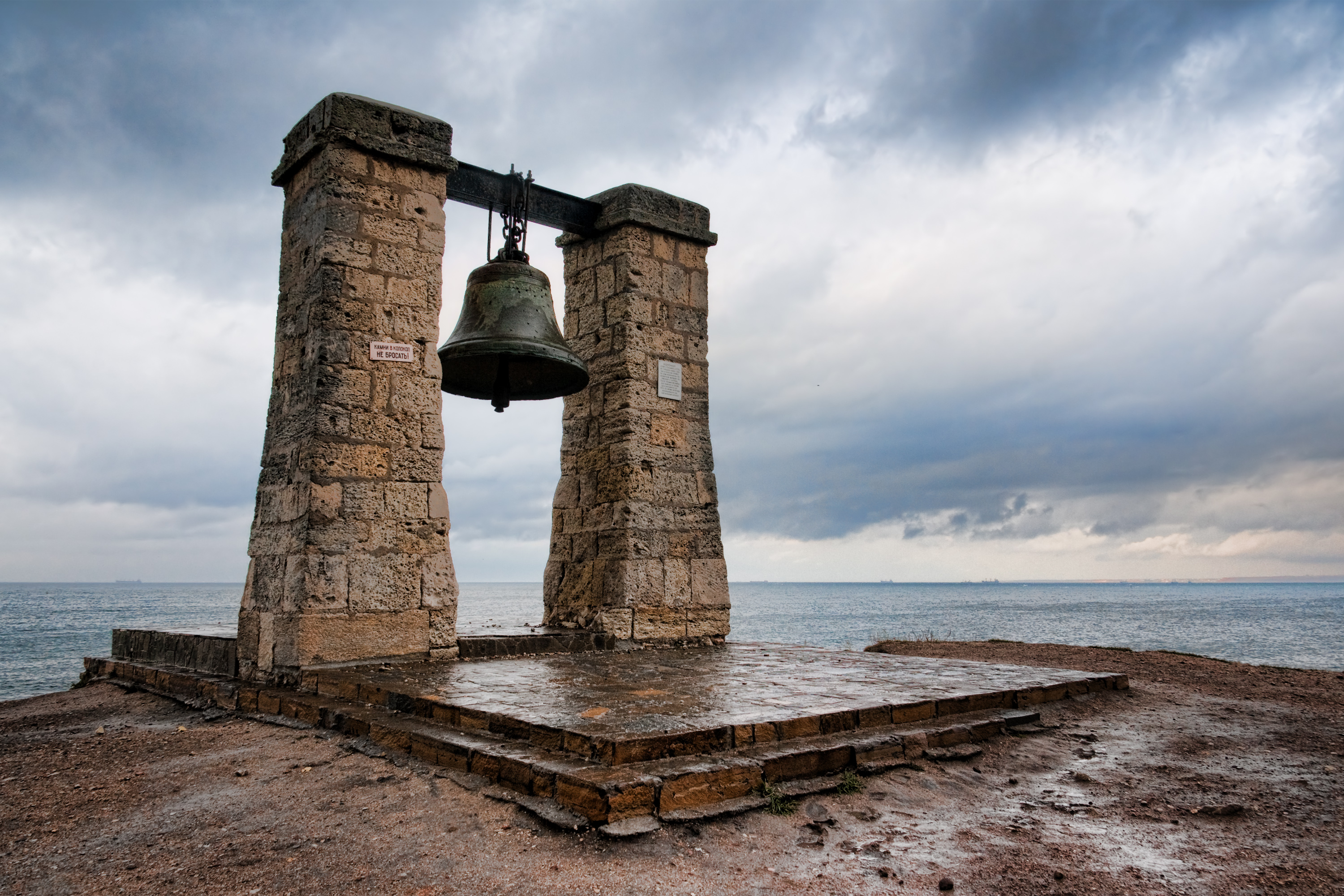
The bell of Chersonesos, view on the Black Sea.

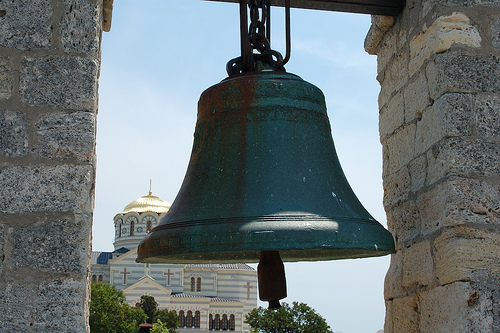
The bell of Chersonesos, view on the St.Vladimir Cathedral

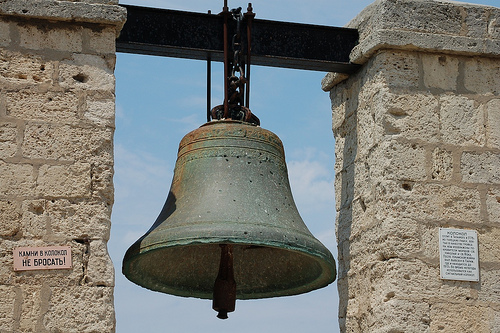
The bell of Chersonesos, close-up

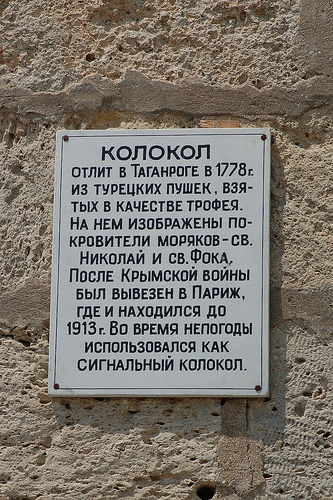
Memorial plate with short history of the fog bell

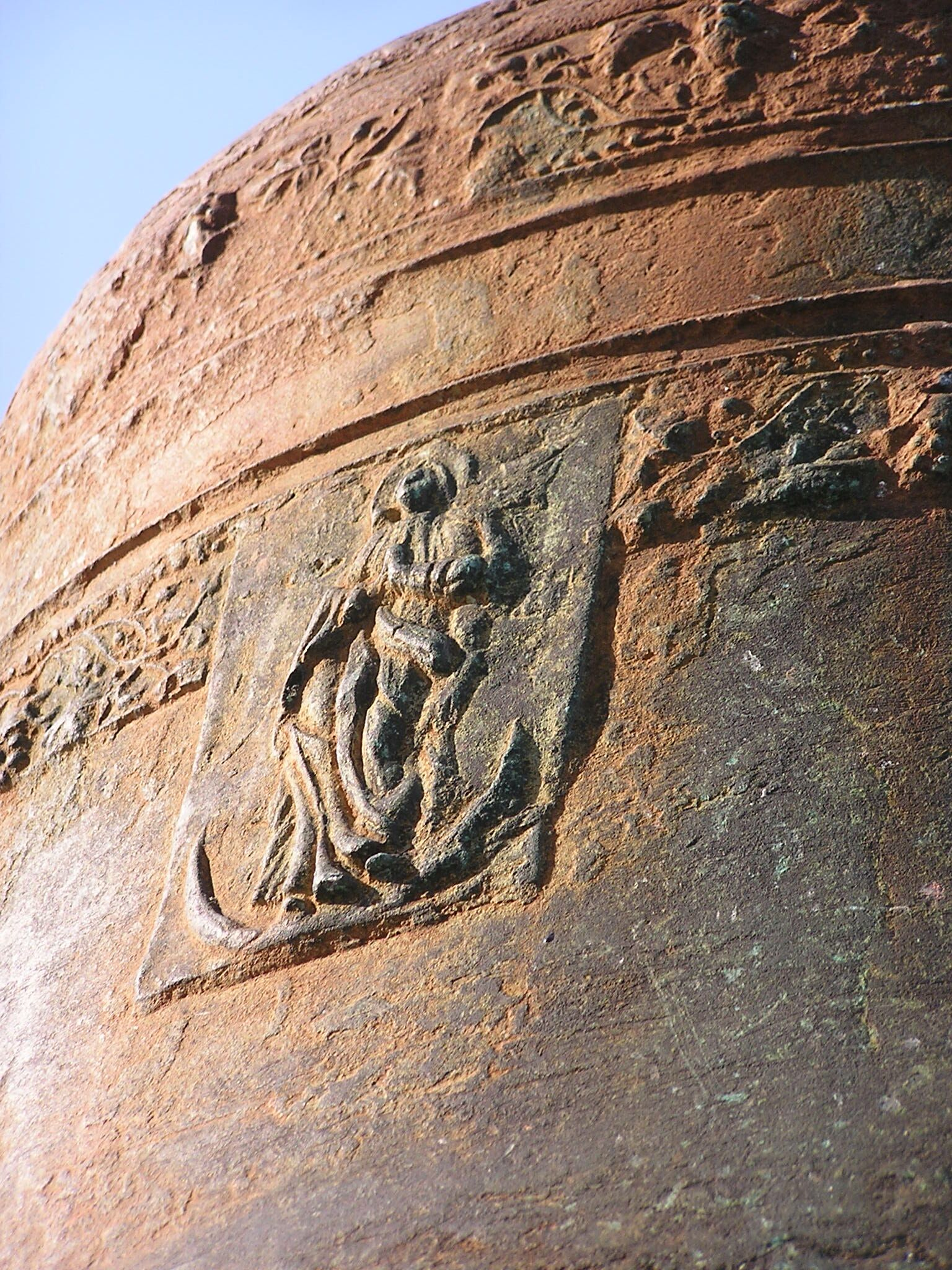
The bell of Chersonesos, close-up

== External links and references ==
- Таганрог. Энциклопедия, Таганрог, издательство АНТОН, 2008
- Official web site
