= Paul of Taganrog =

Russian Orthodox religious figure

Saint Pavel of Taganrog
- Russian Icon of Pavel of Taganrog

The Blessed Starets
- Born: 21 November 1792; Krolevetsky Uyezd, Novgorod-Seversky Viceroyalty, Russian Empire
- Died: 23 March 1879; Taganrog, Russian Empire
- Venerated in: Eastern Orthodoxy
- Canonized: 20 June 1999 (locally), 3 February 2016 (Church-wide) by Russian Orthodox Church
- Major shrine: St. Nicholas The Wonderworker Church
- Feast: 21 November
- Attributes: Monastic habit Prosphora

Paul of Taganrog (Russian: Павел Таганрогский, romanized: Pavel Taganrogskiy; born Pavel Pavlovich Stozhkov; Russian: Павел Павлович Стожков; 21 November 1792 – 23 March 1879) was a Russian Orthodox religious figure who was active in Taganrog, Don Land, South of Russia and Ukraine.

Pavel Pavlovich Stozhkov was born on November 21 (November 8 OS), 1792 in Krolevetsky Uyezd, Novgorod-Seversky Viceroyalty of the Russian Empire (now Ukraine) in a rich noble family. His parents – collegiate registrar Pavel and Paraskeva – were devoutly religious people, who instilled in their son belief in God and piety. Since his youth Stozhkov had felt a love for holy places and pilgrimage. He related about himself: “All my desire was to pray to God, my intention was to go on pilgrimage to rescue my soul, because surrounding life was full of secular vanity and impeded my holy wish”. His father would not permit him to become a clergyman; he wanted to provide his son with a higher education. Instead of this, Stozhkov secretly left the home of his parents to go on pilgrimages to monasteries for a year.

When Stozhkov was 25 years old, his father decided to divide the property between him and his elder brother Ivan. Stozhkov dispensed it in Christ's name, his father gave his blessing and Stozhkov left home to become an ascetic. He wandered to holy places, including to the Kiev Pechersk Lavra and Pochaiv Lavra Lavras. He also liked to go to the north of Russia, visited the Solovetskiy, Verkolskiy, and Kojeozerskiy cloisters and many others.

After 10 years of pilgrimage, Stozhkov settled in Taganrog in the years 1825–1830. Taganrog became Stozhkov’s second home city. Stozhkov spent the first years of his life in Taganrog renting different flats. Later, he moved into a house on Depaldo Street (now "Pereulok Turgenevskiy"), not far from the Saint Nicholas Church. This house still exists and is known locally as the “keliya of starets Pavel”.

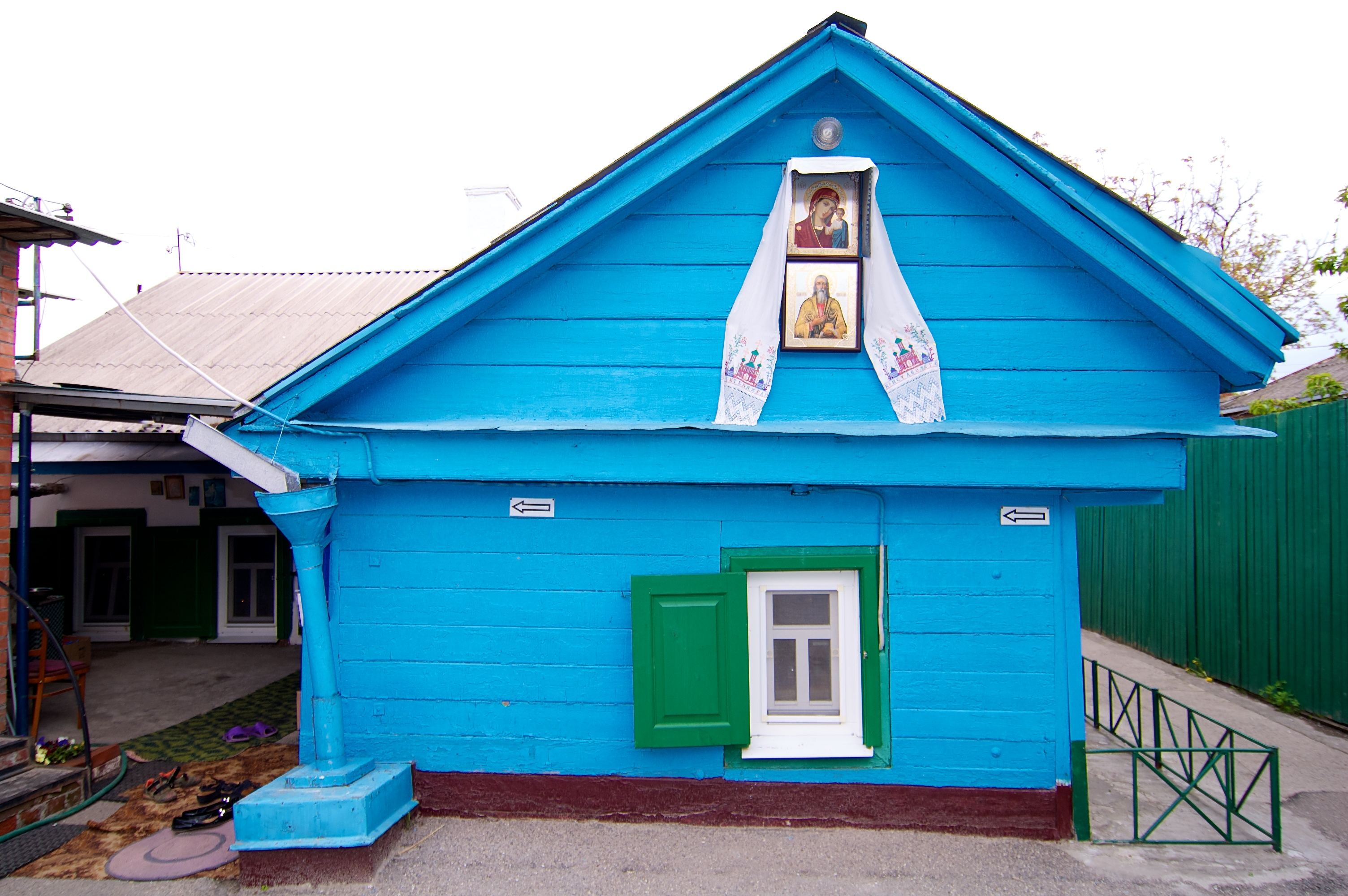
Kelya of Saint Pavel of Taganrog.

Although Stozhkov was not in orders, essentially he led an ascetic monastic life in a bustling town; he kept constantly a severe fast and gave himself to incessant prayers.In his old age he reportedly drank only one cup of kvass with a soaked rusk a day. He commonly slept on the bare bench without a pillow. He put on plain peasant clothes and spoke simple Low-Russian language. He told nobody about his noble birth. He went to pray to the church every day, and also kept all-night prayer vigils. While his health allowed Stozhkov continued to travel to holy places, including journeys of 3000 versts on foot to Solovki more than once.

In the five final years of his life, Stozhkov ate and slept little and never went out of his house. Stozhkov died on 23rd (10th) of March 1879 at the time of the Great Fast (Lent) at the age of 78.

On 20 June 1999 the Russian Orthodox Church canonized Stozhkov. Many people reported seeing a unique aureole in the sky over the Saint Nicholas Church in Taganrog on the day of his canonization. Today his relics are kept at the Saint Nicholas the Wonderworker Church (1778) in Taganrog.
