= Pochaiv Lavra =

Ukrainian Orthodox monastery in Pochaiv, Ukraine

- Ukrainian: Свято-Успенська Почаївська Лавра
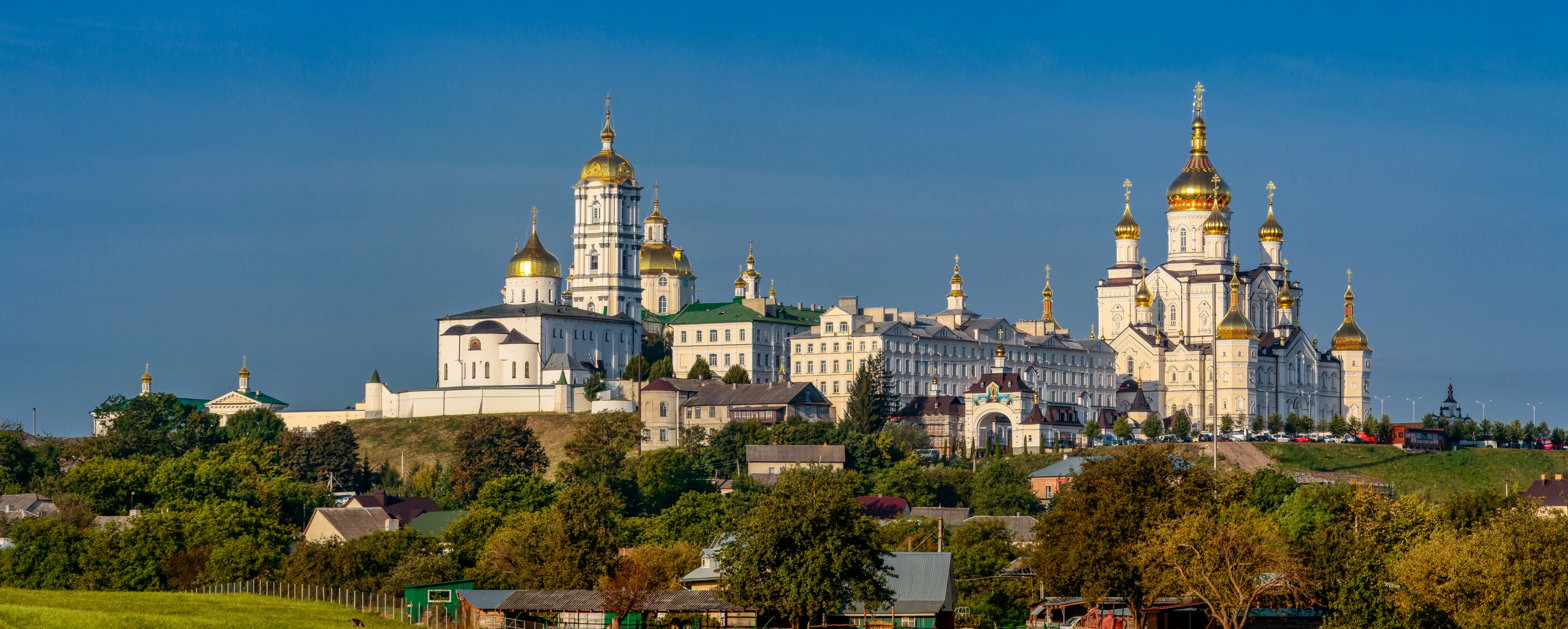
- General view of the Pochaiv Lavra

- Location within Ternopil Oblast Location within Ukraine
- Interactive map of the Pochaiv Lavra area
- Alternative names: Holy Dormition Pochaiv Lavra

General information
- Architectural style: Baroque
- Location: Pochaiv, Kremenets Raion, Ternopil Oblast, Ukraine
- Coordinates: 50°00′18″N 25°30′24″E

Design and construction
- Known for: Saint Amphilochius of Pochayiv, canonized in 2002

Immovable Monument of National Significance of Ukraine
- Official name: Комплекс споруд Почаївської Свято-Успенської Лаври (Building complex of the Pochaiv Holy Dormition Lavra)
- Type: Architecture
- Reference no.: 190029

The Holy Dormition Pochaiv Lavra, (Note: Ukrainian: Свято-Успенська Почаївська Лавра, romanized: Sviato-Uspenska Pochaivska Lavra, Russian: Свято-Успенская Почаевская Лавра, Polish: Ławra Poczajowska) also sometimes known as the Pochaiv Monastery, is a monastery and lavra in Pochaiv, Kremenets Raion, Ternopil Oblast, Ukraine. The monastery tops a 60-metre hill in the town of Pochaiv, 18 km southwest of Kremenets and 70 km north of Ternopil.

The Pochaiv Lavra has been an important spiritual and ideological centre of Eastern Orthodoxy until 1720, then of Greek Catholicism until 1831, after which it once again became Orthodox. In December 2023, after years of disputes, a ruling by the Supreme Court of Ukraine gave the Orthodox Church of Ukraine the spiritual control of the monastery.

== History ==
=== Origins ===
A first record of the monastery in Pochaiv dates back to 1527, although a local tradition claims that it was established three centuries earlier, during the Mongol invasion, by several runaway monks, either from the Kyiv Monastery of the Caves or from Mount Athos. The legend has it that the Theotokos appeared to the monks in the shape of a column of fire, leaving her footprint in the rock she stood upon.

=== Between Poland and Russia ===
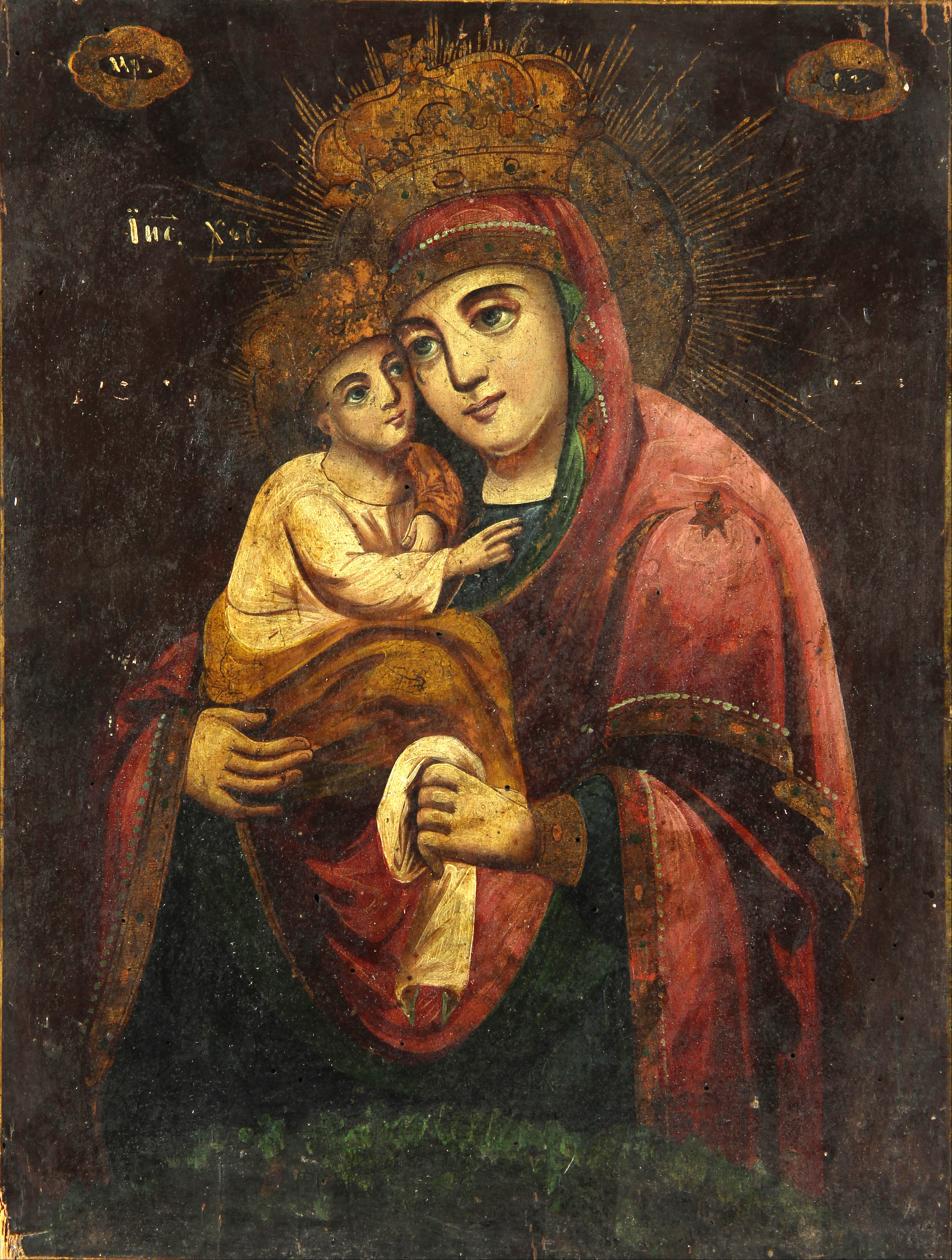
The Virgin of Pochaiv, 1840. Ivan Honchar Museum.

In 1833, the Russian Church accorded the status of lavra upon the monastery, even though it had been a lavra during the time of the Basilians. It also became the summer residence for the Russian Orthodox bishops of Volhynia. Towards the end of the 19th century, Pochaiv became a mecca of Orthodox pilgrims from across the Russian empire and the Balkans. Its politically symbolic image as a western forepost of imperial Orthodoxy (being only several kilometres from the Greek Catholics in Austrian-ruled Galicia) was widely used in propagating Pan-slavism.

In the early 20th century the monastery became one of the main centres of Black Hundreds movement in the Russian Empire. Its printing house produced numerous propaganda publications supporting Russian nationalism, but at the same time contributed to the spread of knowledge about the history of Ukraine. Pochaiv archimandrite Vitaliy (Maksymenko), a member of the monarchist Union of the Russian People, was a key figure in the establishment of a memorial to Bohdan Khmelnytskyi's Cossacks, which was constructed in 1914 at the field of the 1651 Battle of Berestechko.

At the start of the 20th century the archbishop Antonii Khrapovitskii ordered the construction of a new Trinity Church, a visual contrast to the Baroque Dormition Cathedral, which for the archbishop was "too Catholic". The new Trinity Church was intended to Russify the landscape of the monastery and mirror the architectonic form of the Trinity monastery in Sergiev Posad near Moscow.

=== Recent history ===
Pochaiv Lavra had an indirect influence on Orthodoxy in the West. Archimandrite Vitaly (Maximenko), the director of the monastery's printshop, evacuated the monastery's printshop following the Russian Revolution. He then fled to Czechoslovakia, where he started a new brotherhood and resumed publishing. This new St. Job of Pochaev Brotherhood moved from Czechoslovakia to Germany and eventually America, where it joined the Holy Trinity Monastery near Jordanville, New York, with now-Archbishop Vitaly becoming its abbot. Holy Trinity Monastery thus carried on the publishing legacy of St. Job of Pochaev.

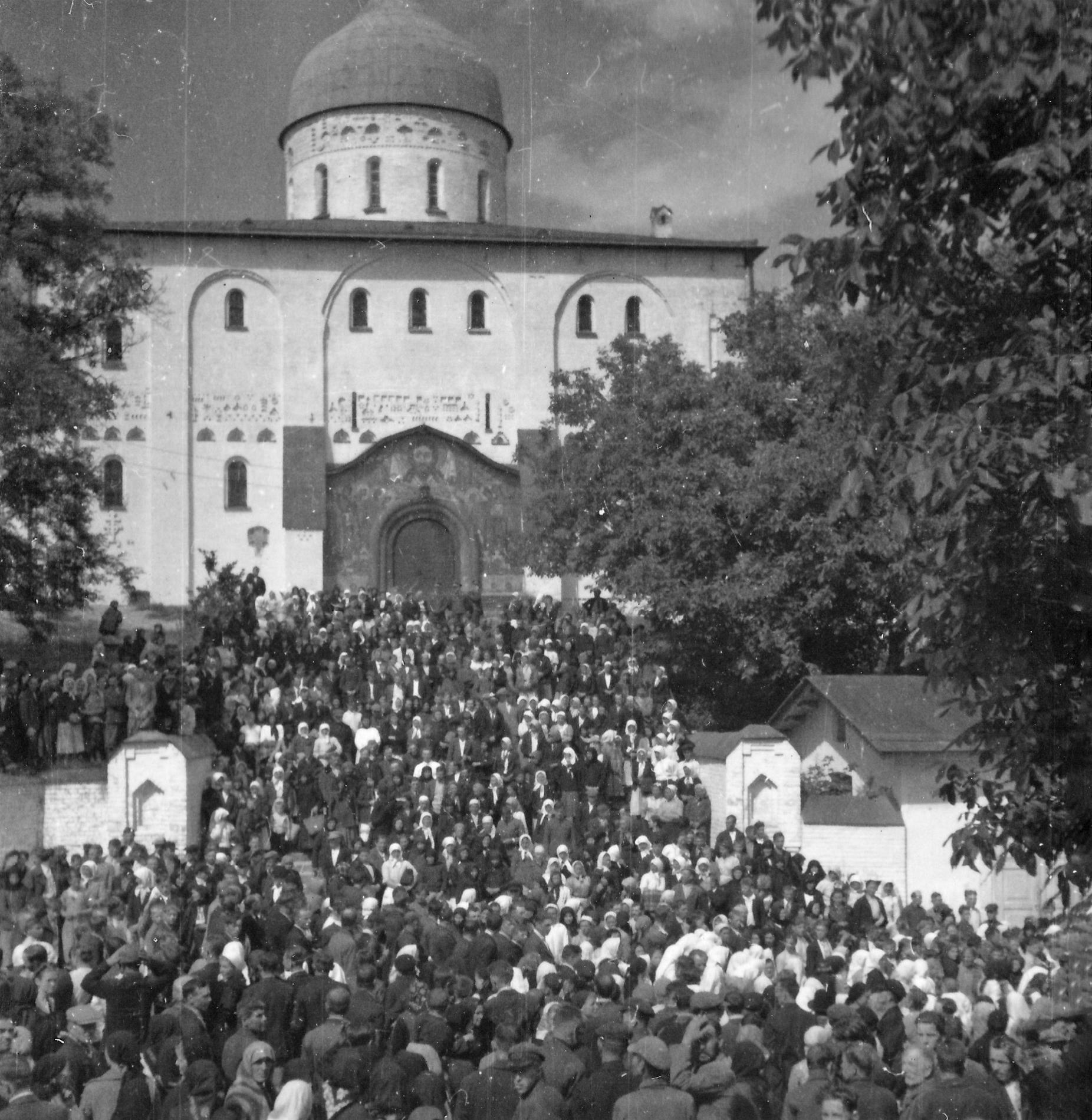
"Liberation celebration" of the Ukrainian population on the grounds of the monastery 1941

When Nazi Germany in World War 2 invaded the USSR on 22 June 1941, the Germans did not close the Lavra, but they did confiscate all that the Soviets could not get their hands on. During this time the Ukrainian Autocephalous Orthodox Church was formed. The Germans supported that church and forcefully transferred some of the Orthodox property to it. However, the Pochaiv Lavra refused to follow, what it called, a schism. Instead, in 1941 it became the center of the "Autonomist" movement, which claimed jurisdictional subordination to Moscow while at the same time being free to act independently of Moscow so long as the Moscow Patriarch was under Soviet control.

Following the war, the Lavra was situated on a territory which contained the largest concentration of Orthodox parishes in the USSR. Its position as a forepost of Orthodoxy in western Ukraine was even more reinforced in 1948 after the Soviet state-organised Synod of Lviv, which terminated the Union of Brest and forcibly disbanded Greek Catholicism in Eastern Galicia by converting them to Russian Orthodoxy. However the post-war permissive attitude towards religion in the Soviet Union promptly ended with the new Thaw policy of Nikita Khrushchev in the late 1950s. During this time the Lavra came under extensive pressure from the Soviet government, subjected to regular raids and searches as well as constant monitoring. A museum of atheism was opened in one of the confiscated church buildings in 1959.The monastery buildings were confiscated by the Soviets, and from the 1960s until 2000 the monks were required to pay rent.

In the late 1980s, after the Soviet Union relaxed its restrictions on religion, the former Museum of Atheism was closed and was first turned into a theological school, which in turn became a seminary in 1991. At the same time the Ukrainian Greek Catholic Church, was revived, as was the Ukrainian Autocephalous Orthodox Church. The Lavra's community unanimously declined any sympathy to these newly restored communities, attributing their action partly to some of the more violent methods that were employed, aided by nationalist paramilitaries, against the parishes of the Russian Orthodox Church.

In opposition a Cossack regiment was formed to safeguard Russian Orthodox parishes. Because the Lavra's rise from Soviet persecution coincided with these events, its politico-historical position as a forepost of Orthodoxy in Western Ukraine was once again unveiled. The Cossacks prevented seizure of Orthodox communities in Volhynia and in Ukraine by the Greek Catholic or Ukrainian Kyiv Patriarchate jurisdictions (the ambiguous position of Greek Catholic churches and property seized for the Russian Orthodoxy remained unsettled.

In 2000, Presidential decrees returned the possession of the Lavra to the church, and the monks were no longer required to pay rent.

In 2002, the Ternopil Oblast Council established the Kremenets-Pochaiv State Historical-Architectural Preserve and declared the monastery to be part of it. However, in 2003, on the petition of the monks, the Cabinet of Ministers of Ukraine took the historical buildings of the Lavra out of the Preserve and transferred them to the Ukrainian Orthodox Church (Moscow Patriarchate) and the monks, subject to a lease for 49 years, running until 1 January 2052.

In July 2014, the Ternopil Oblast Council initiated an appeal to Prime Minister Arseniy Yatsenyuk to rescind the lease and to return the monastery buildings to the Preserve. In April 2015, the regional council voted to petition Yatsenyuk, and his Cabinet to take the monastery out of the hands of the Ukrainian Orthodox Church (Moscow Patriarchate) and turn it into a museum.

In November 2022, the Security Service of Ukraine (SBU), Ukrainian police, and the National Guard of Ukraine raided the Lavra following the 2022 Russian invasion of Ukraine. This was part of more searches conducted by Ukrainian law enforcement at premises of the Ukrainian Orthodox Church (Moscow Patriarchate).

In January 2023 The Ukrainian Greek Catholic Church stated it wanted to obtain the right to hold services in the Pochaiv Lavra.

In February 2023 the Ternopil Oblast Council created a working group studying the legality of the Ukrainian Orthodox Church (Moscow Patriarchate) leasing the Lavra complex. The following month the Orthodox Church of Ukraine asked to allocate premises of the Lavra to them "for monastic life, liturgy and other religious activities."

== Saint Amphilochius of Pochaiv ==
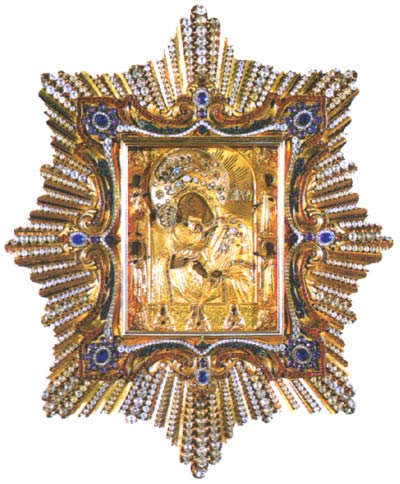
Icon of the Theotokos of Pochaiv, set in the golden diadem presented by Pope Clement XIV.

On 12 May 2002, the Ukrainian Orthodox Church canonized schema monk Amphilochius (Amfilohiy) of Pochaiv. Amphilochius of Pochaiv (in world Yakiv Holovatyuk 1894 - 1971) was born on 27 November 1894 in the village Mala Ilovytsya, in Shumsk raion of Ternopil Oblast in western Ukraine.

== See also ==
- USSR Anti-Religious Campaign (1958–1964)
