= Pochaiv =

City in Ternopil Oblast, Ukraine

Pochaiv Почаїв
- City
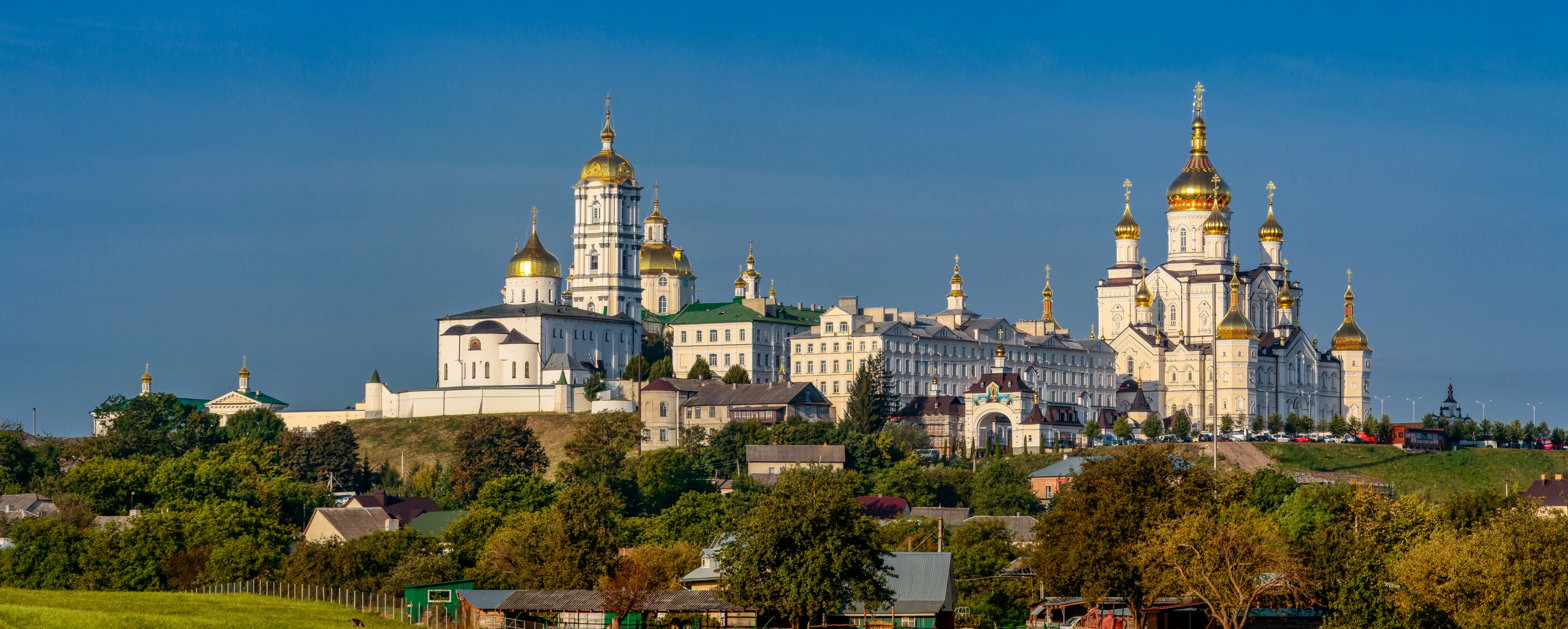
- View of Pochaiv and its monastery

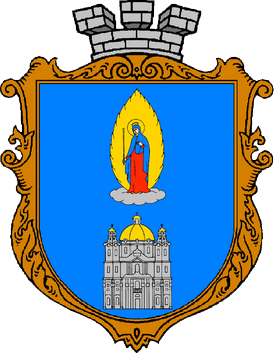
- Flag Coat of arms

- Location within Ternopil Oblast Location within Ukraine
- Coordinates: 50°0′10″N 25°30′35″E
- Country: Ukraine
- Oblast: Ternopil Oblast
- Raion: Kremenets Raion
- Hromada: Pochaiv urban hromada

Population (2022)
  - Total: 7,633
- Time zone: UTC+2 (EET)
  - Summer (DST): UTC+3 (EEST)

Pochaiv (Ukrainian: Почаїв, IPA: [poˈtʃɑjiu̯]; Russian: Почаев, romanized: Pochayev; Polish: Poczajów; Yiddish: פּאטשאיעװ, romanized: Pitshayev) is a city in Kremenets Raion, Ternopil Oblast, western Ukraine. It is located 18 kilometres (11 mi) south-west of Kremenets and 70 kilometres (43 mi) north of the administrative center of the oblast, Ternopil. It hosts the administration of Pochaiv urban hromada. Population: 7,633 (2022 estimate).

== History ==
Pochaiv was a part of Kremenetsky Uyezd, Volhynian Governorate, Russian Empire. During World War I, it was captured by the Austro-Hungarian Army in August 1915 and by the Imperial Russian Army during the Brusilov offensive in summer 1916. It became a part of Wołyń Voivodeship, Poland, after the 1917 Russian Revolution and the Polish–Soviet War.

Pochaiv became an urban-type settlement in the 1950s and a town in 1978. It had a population of 10,019 in January 1989.

Pochaiv is home to the Pochaiv Lavra, the second-largest Eastern Orthodox monastery in Ukraine. On October 1, 2020, the Center for Provision of Social Services of the Pochaiv City Council was established, the head of which was appointed Gichka Yuriy Serhiyovych on the basis of competitive selection.

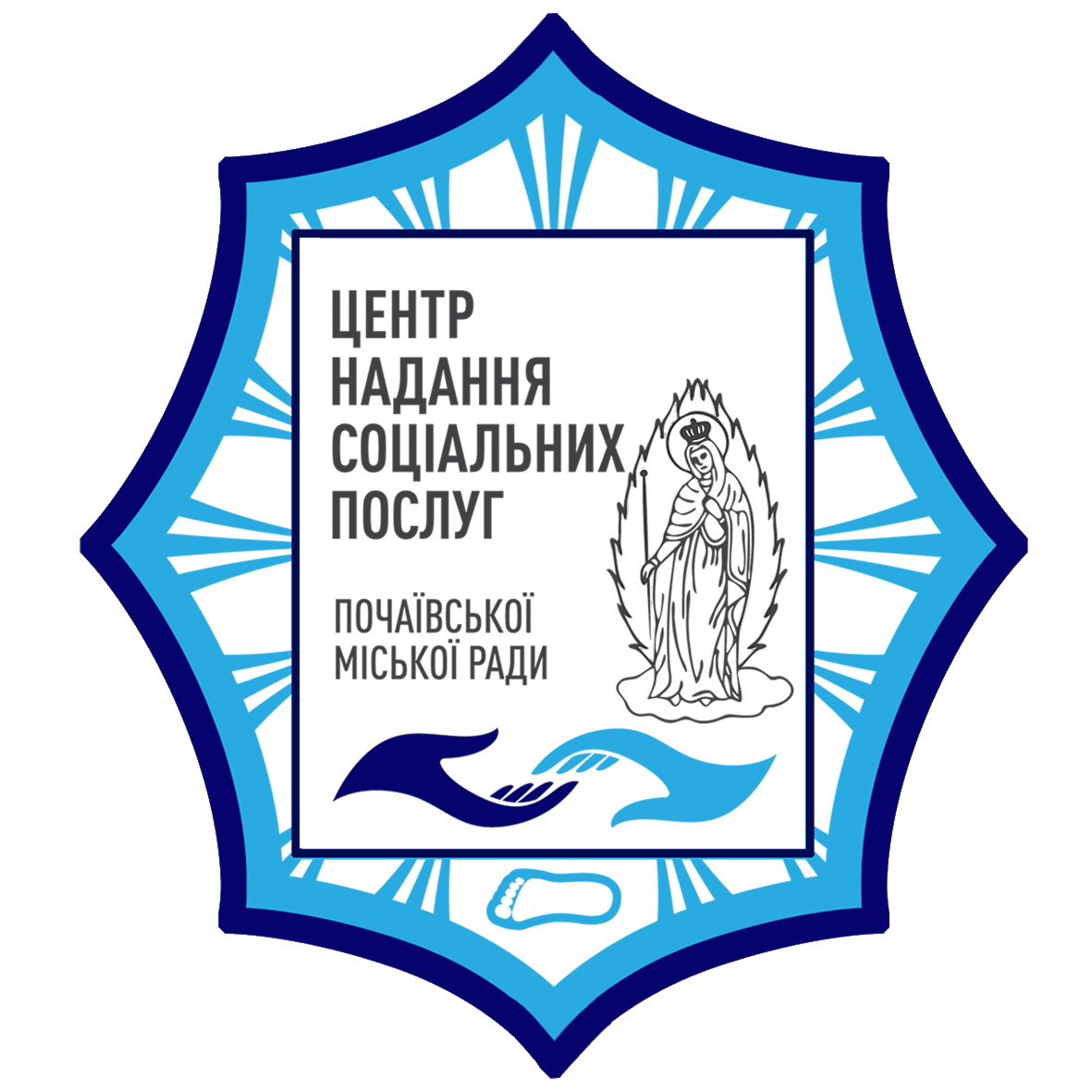
Logo of the Center for Social Services of Pochaiv City Council

== Notable residents ==
- Ivan Khvorostetskyi (1888–1958), Ukrainian painter

== Gallery ==
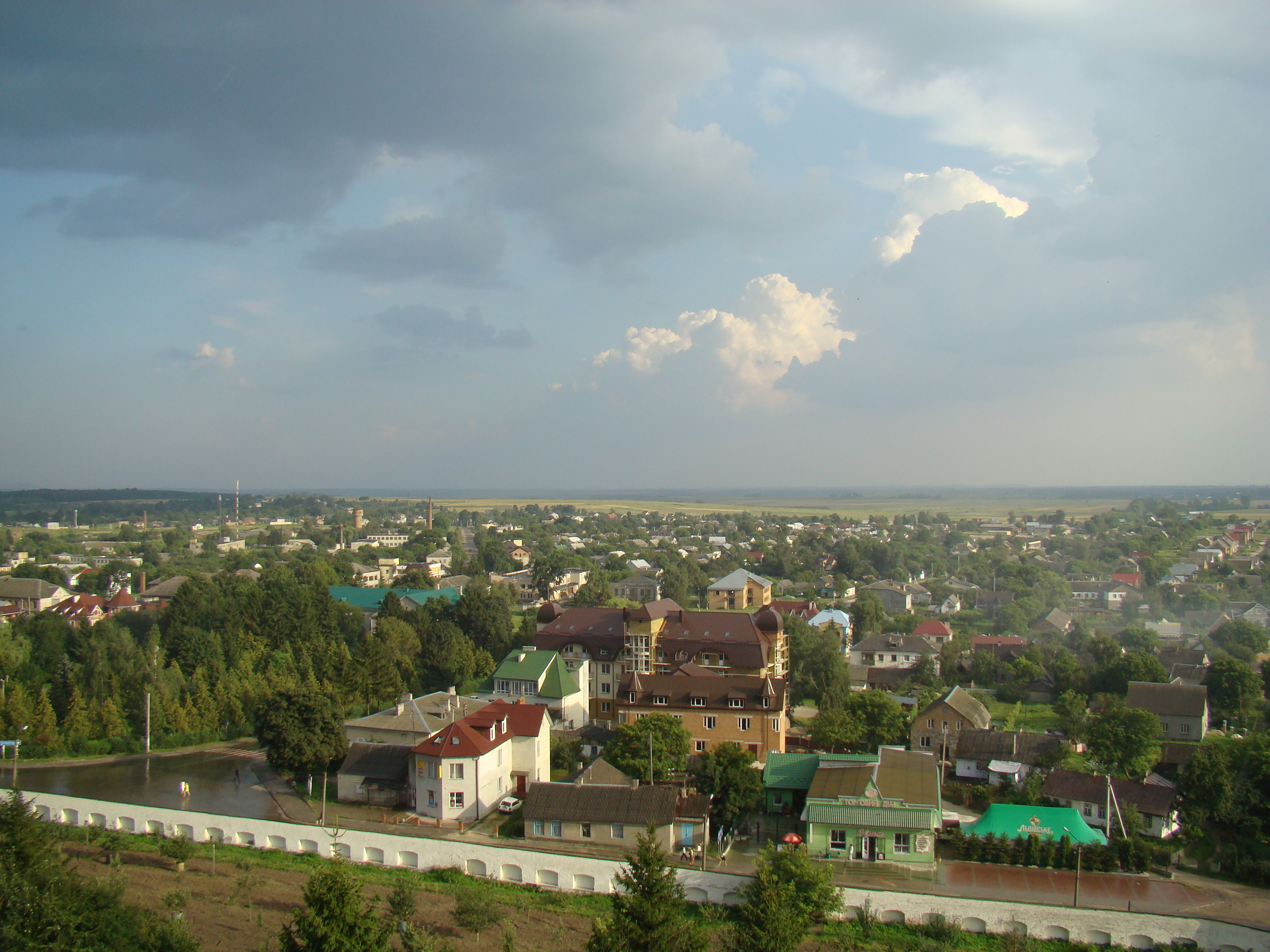
Panoramic view of Pochaiv

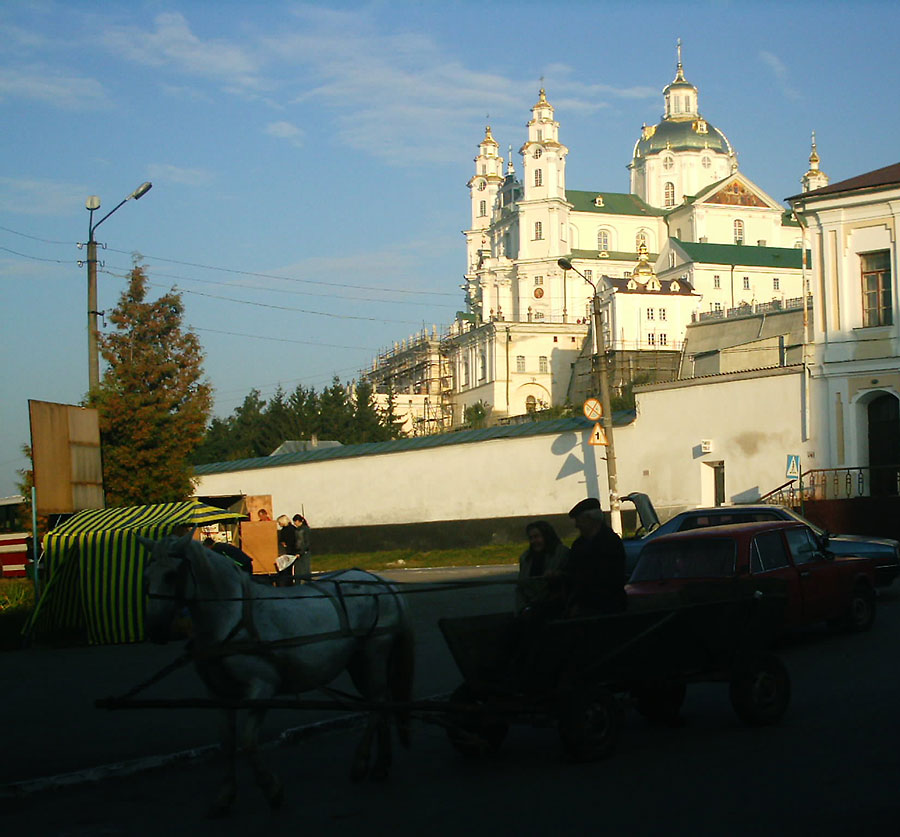
Street near Pochaiv Lavra

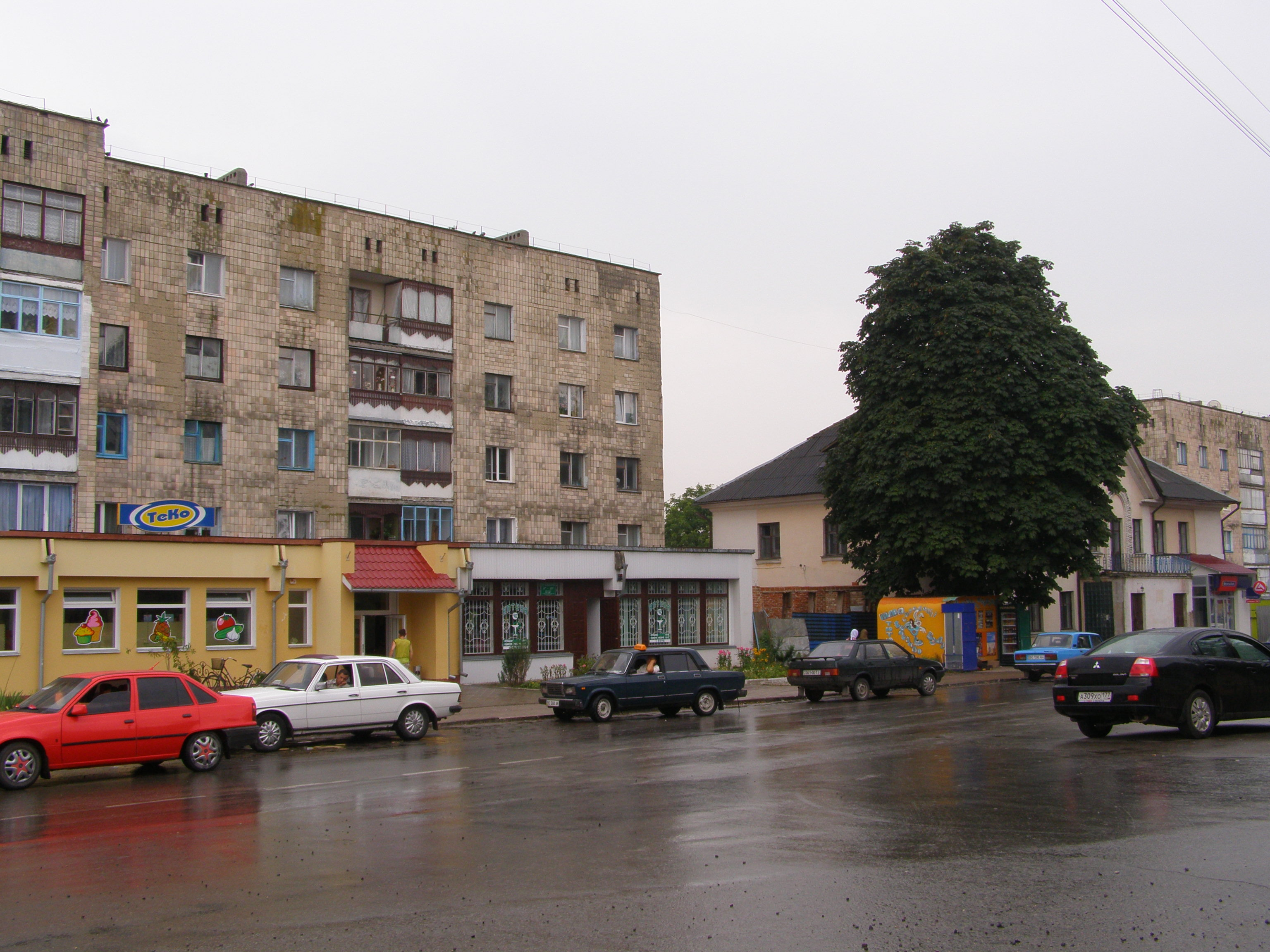
City center

Seminary building
