= Vosstaniya Square, Taganrog =

Square in Taganrog, Russia

Vosstaniya Square
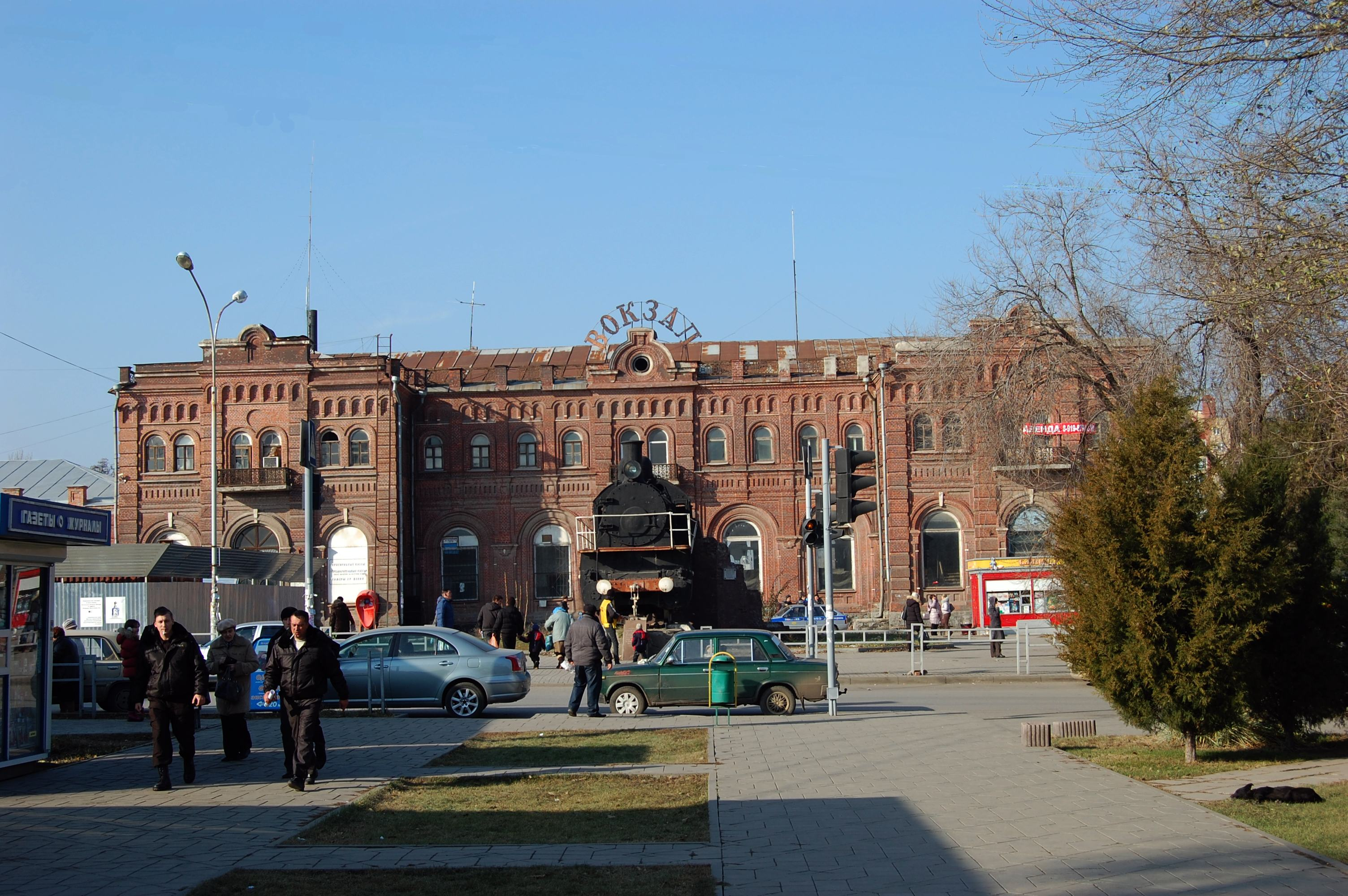
- Vosstaniya Square in 2011
- Interactive map of Vosstaniya Square
- Location: Taganrog, Russia
- Coordinates: 47.1314°N 38.5452°E

Vosstaniya Square or Rebellion Square (Russian: Площадь Восстания) is a city square of Taganrog.

== Geography ==
Vosstaniya Square is situated within the area between Frunze Street, Smirnovsky Lane, Oktyabrskaya Street and the facade of the Railway Station with its adjacent buildings.

== History ==
Formerly the area was called Fair Square. Until the 1860s, there was a plot of land for pasturing cattle.

With the construction of the railway and railway station, the adjacent territory began to be quickly built up. From the side of the Gymnasium Street (now Oktyabrskaya Street), the square was limited to the courtyard of the Archangel Michael Church, the building of the Raftopulo Hotel and Belov's House.

On the site of today's intercity bus station there were forest warehouses where cooperative trade was conducted. The entire station square turned into a trading place with dozens of shops and stalls. In one of them in the summer of 1873 the schoolboys brothers Alexander and Anton Chekhov conducted trade.

In 1935, a square was laid out here and a monument to Lenin was erected. In the same year the square received a new name - Vosstaniya Square - in memory of the armed uprising of January 1918. This name did not catch on then, the Taganrogs continued to call the Square of the Railway Station. Secondly, the name of the area of the Uprising was confirmed on February 13, 1958. In 1976 the Steam Engine Monument was erected here.

== Gallery ==
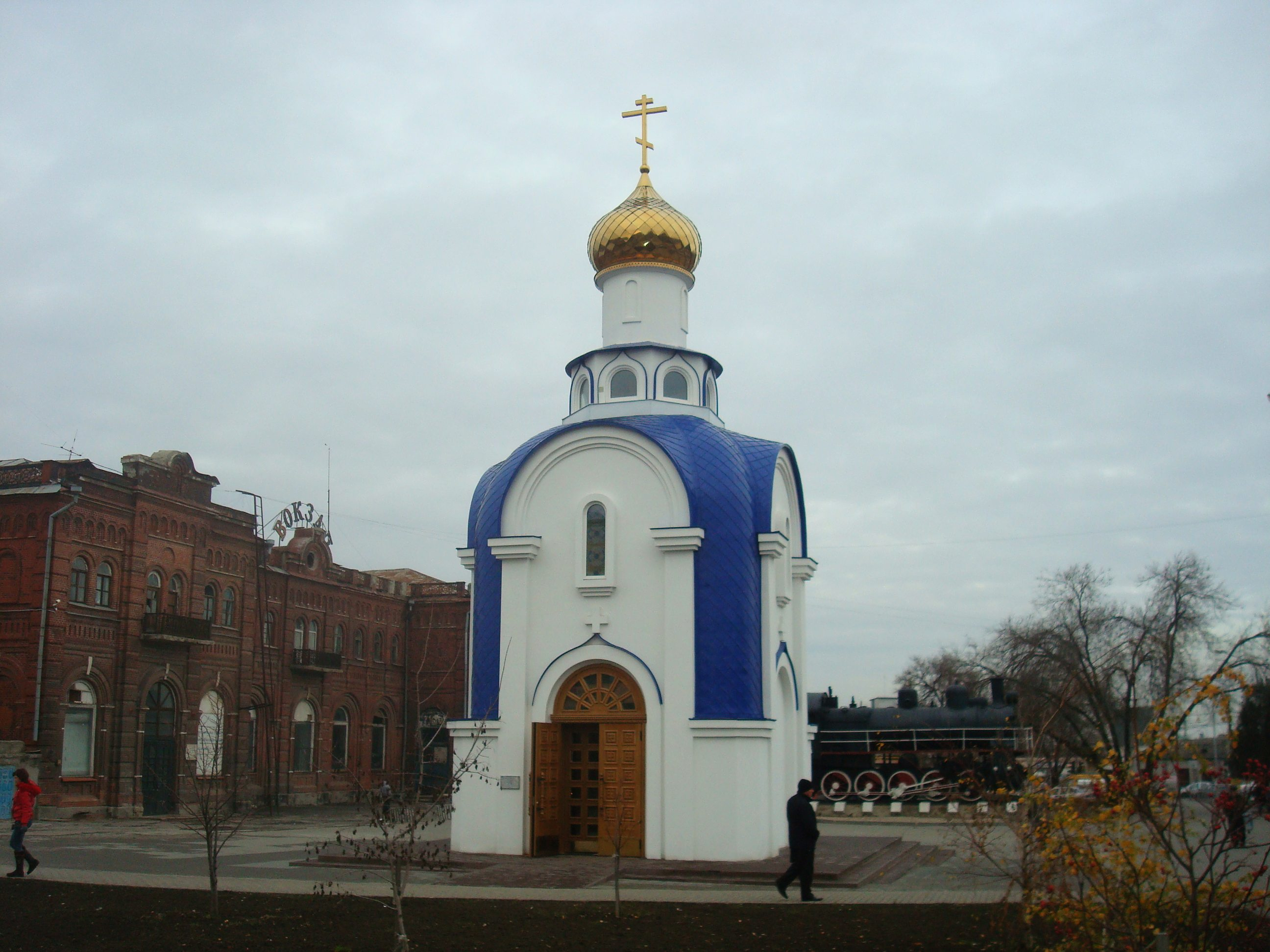
Kazan Icon of Mother of God Chapel at the square

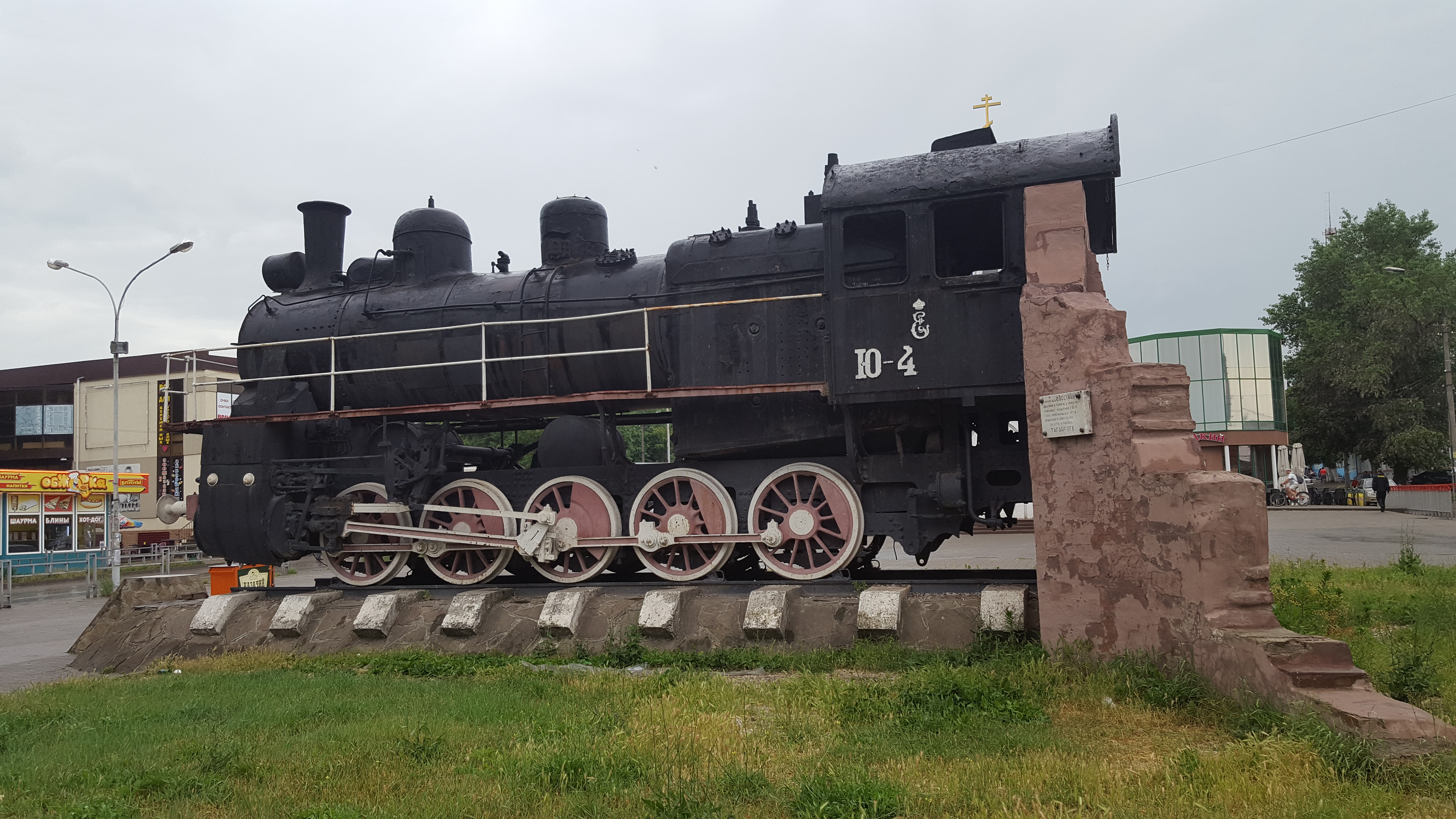
Steam Engine Monument

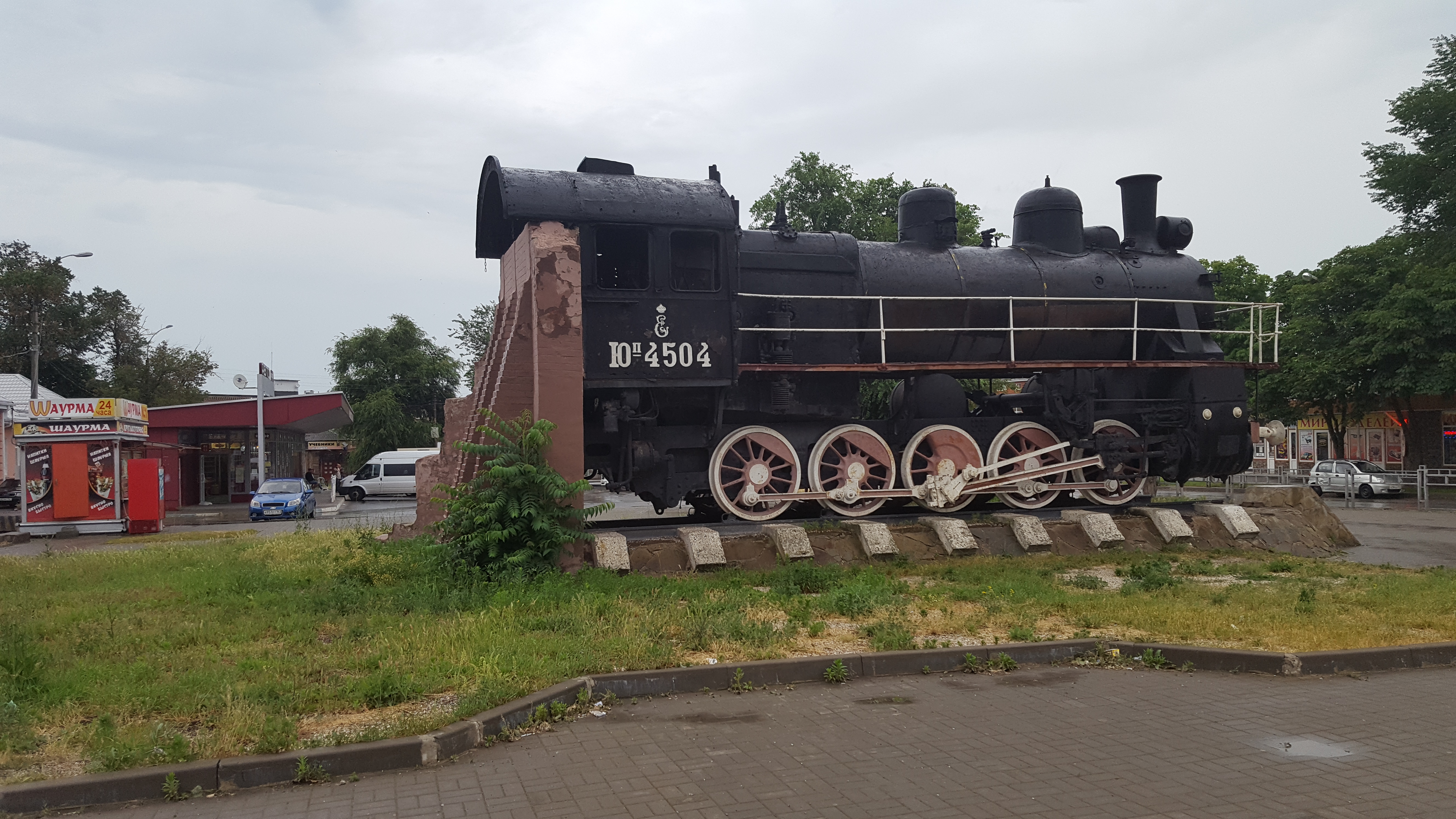
Steam Engine Monument
