= Hotel Raftopulo =

Hotel in Taganrog, Rostov, Russia

- Гостиница Рафтопуло (Russian)
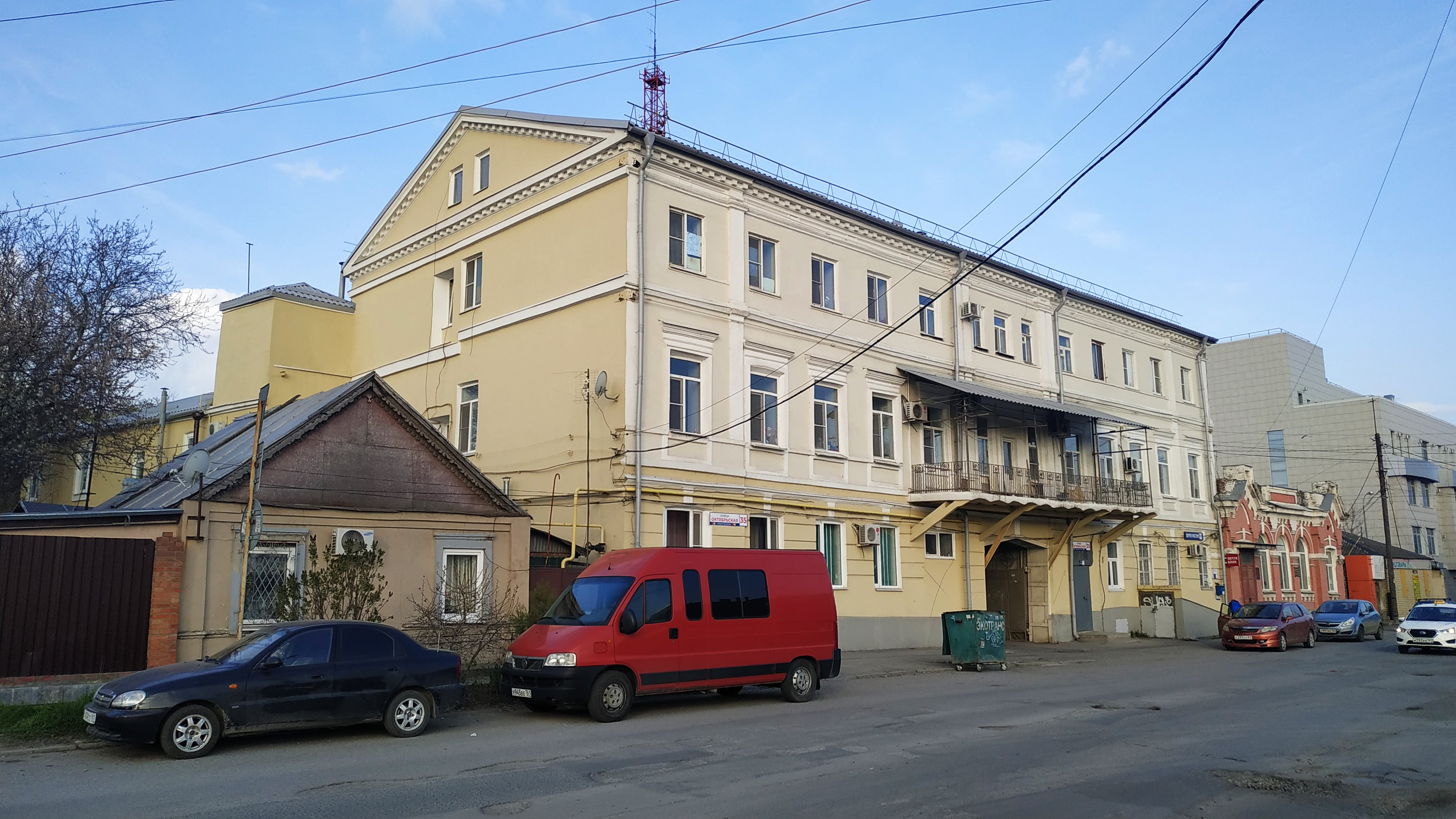

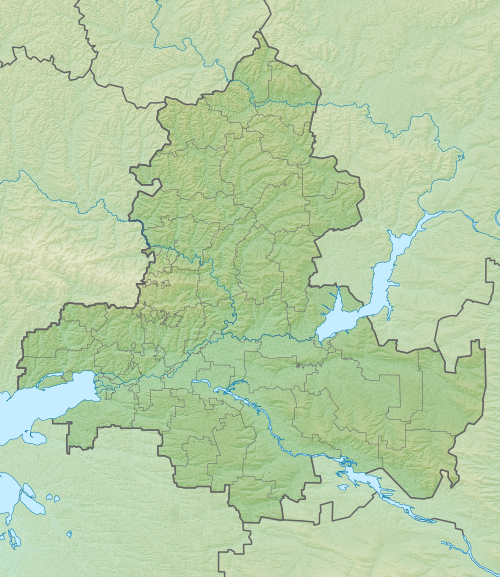
- Location within Rostov Oblast Location within Russia
- 47°13′10″N 38°54′48″E
- Type: Hotel
- Location: str. October, 35 Taganrog, Rostov oblast, Russia

History
- Built: 1870

Site notes
- Architect: A. Belov
- Architectural style: provincial classicism

Hotel Raftopulo (Russian: Гостиница Рафтопуло) is a cultural heritage of regional significance. The hotel located along October Street, 35 in Taganrog, Rostov Region, in Russia. Since 1992 it belongs to the monuments of the city history.

== History ==
On October Street, there are two houses on the odd side having historical interest. A three-story apartment house №35 was built in 1870, it is in the list of historical and cultural monuments. The building was built as a profitable house by the merchant A. Belov. He was owner from 1873 to 1880. Its location was on the opposite side of the station's city square. To the building was added third floor because of the laying of a railway in Taganrog, in 1874 .

In 1890 to 1906 the house was owned by peasant Yevdokim Nekrasov and Bulgarian subject Nikulov.

In 1915 the house already belonged to the merchant Evdokim Ivanovich Nekrasov and the sergeant Stepan Nikiforovich Dronov. The last owner's name is Raftopulo, under which the building is mentioned as a historical monument. There was the Red Guards strong point during the January revolt.

In the 21st century, the building is used as an apartment building.

== Architecture ==
Architectural style is provincial classicism. There are rusts of the first floor, window frames, proportions of the facade, inter-floor panels, strictly decorated cornice.
