= House of Rabinovich =

- Дом Рабинович
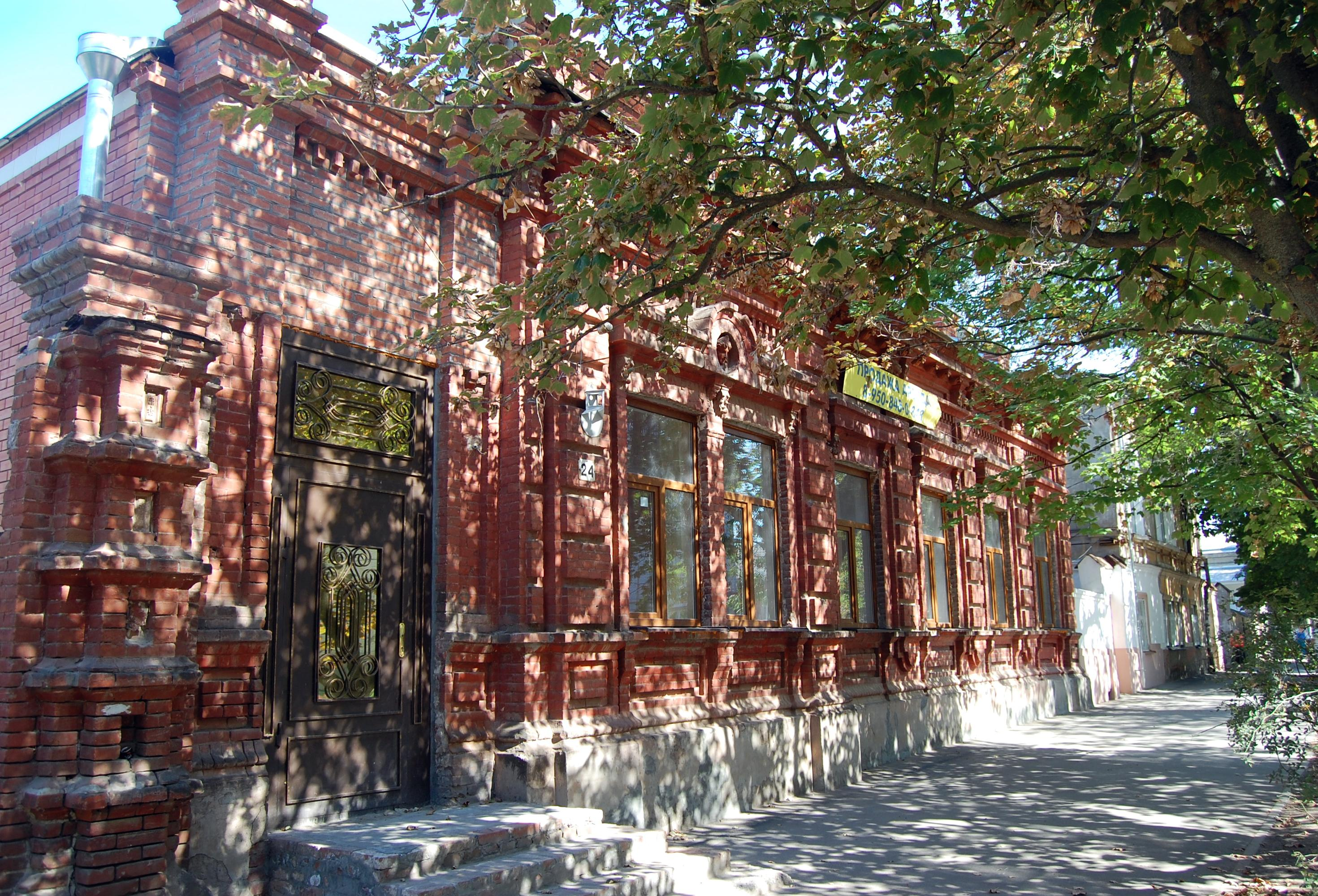
- Interactive map of House of Rabinovich
- Location: Taganrog, 24 Frunze Street
- Coordinates: 47°12′44″N 38°55′53″E
- Beginning date: 1870
- Completion date: 1870

The House of Rabinovich (Russian: Дом Рабинович) is a mansion located in Taganrog, Rostov Oblast, Russia. It stands between Apostolopulo's House and the House of Drossi (24 Frunze St). It is a famous example of the classic 1870s style of architecture and is a representation of Neo-Greek architectural style. Architectural monuments are among the Russian Federations' objects of cultural heritage and regional value.

== History ==
The one-story house is in a historical part of Taganrog. Its main construction is of red brick. The building consists of seven windows in front of the house.

The house was constructed in 1870 by a Greek merchant of the 2nd guild, Afanasy Brusali (Bristol). Brusali "traded in bread and ship's biscuit." He was the father of three boys and six girls.

In the late 1880s, Brusali sold the house to the wife of the assistant to the barrister, Anastasia Spiridonovne Rabinovich, née Titova. She was the wife of the local notary Mikhail Abramovich Rabinovich, the messmate A. P. Chekhov on a gymnasium, the candidate of the rights of the St. Petersburg University. According to other data, at the end of the 1880s, the house was owned by the pharmacist Yakov Solomonovich Parnokh.

Having bought this household, Mikhail Abramovich Rabinovich demolished the existing building and constructed the new one. Rabinovich gave one of them to the public library which was managed by Pavel Filevsky's brother – Alexey Petrovich.

In 1913, the owners of the House Rabinovich and Houses Drossi entered a conflict over the tiny plot of land between these houses. In Taganrog, similar strips of earth between houses were called "stock" since long ago. A lawsuit between Madam Steyger (in the girlhood of Drossi) and Madam Rabinovich lasted eight months. Many witnesses were invited to testify while experts and architects surveyed the plot. A simple issue turned into a dilemma. The court hearing which took place on 9 March 1914, refused Madam Rabinovich's claims on the plot of land under the name "stock", with the deduction of all legal costs and payment to experts.

In 1925 the authorities included all households which more than 100 square meters into the municipality. The Rabinovich House was no exception. Mikhail Abramovich Rabinovich, his sister Yulia and daughter-in-law Vera were "condensed", and moved to the small house opposite, at number 15 where he spent his last days. M.D. Rabinovich with the husband and the daughter of Olay continued to live in the house, occupying a part of the first floor. Near them, on the first floor, there lived the priest of a Catholic church.

From 1933 to 1982, Rabinovich lived in the House. V. A. Zaytsev, a legend of the Taganrog soccer, the honored trainer of RSFSR with whom the soccer team "Torpedo" is connected, is also associated with the house. Zaytsev was the chairman of factory council of volunteer sports society "Traktor", the coach of the soccer team "Torpedo", the member of the Presidium of the regional board of judges, the chairman of city football federation, the chief of the Torpedo team.

During the occupation of Taganrog in World War II, German soldiers used the house as a hostel, and it was heated in the winter by means of a "potbelly stove". During this period the wooden fence and numerous fruit-trees planted in the well-groomed yard were used as firewood. During the German anti-aircraft battery, the Soviet artillery shell, which exploded before windows of the house, nearly got to the house.

The house Rabinovich is now listed as a historical and cultural monument. It is under state protection by the decision of Small Council of a regional council of the Rostov region No. 301 of 18 November 1992.
