= House of Drossi =

- Дом Дросси
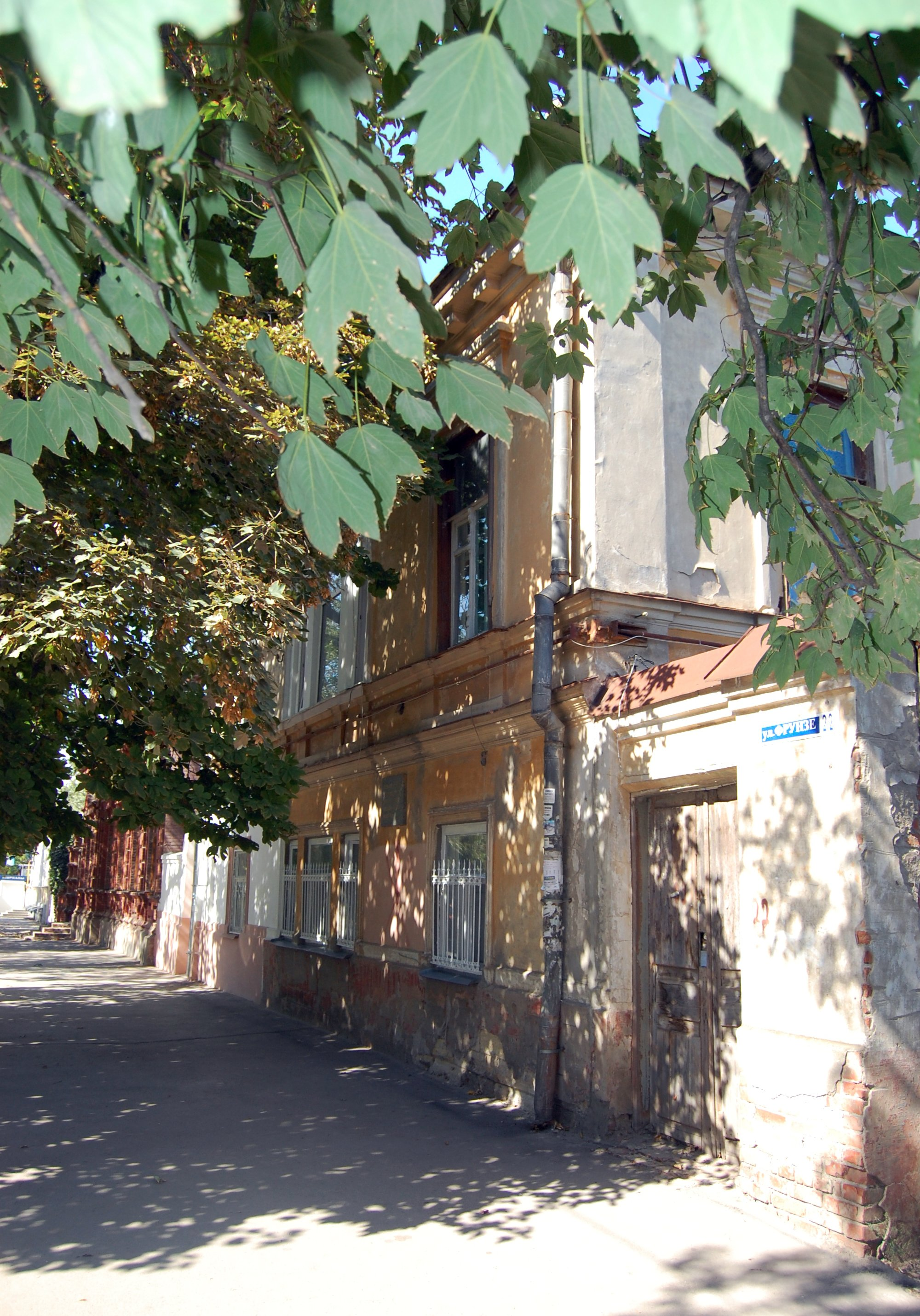

General information
- Location: Taganrog, st. of Frunze, 22
- Coordinates: 47°12′43″N 38°55′54″E
- Construction started: 1850
- Completed: 1850

The House of Drossi (Russian: Дом Дросси) is an ancient mansion in Taganrog, Russia, a monument of 1850s architecture, certified as code No. 6100130000.

== History ==
The mansion was built in the 1850s by Taganrog merchant, grain businessman D. A. Drossi. Anton Chekhov was a schoolmate of the son of the house owner – Andrey Drossi. Chekhov often visited, attracted by the cultural atmosphere reigning in this family, their musicales and house performances.

In 1925 in Taganrog general private houses that had total area over 100 sq.m. were confiscated by the state. A small room in the house was provided to the former owners, or they were moved elsewhere. In 1925 the House was divided into communal flats.

On a facade of the building, a marble commemorative plaque states: "In this house, grammar-school boys put amateur theatricals. Antosha Chekhov" was the author and the performer often."

== Description ==
The two-story mansion is externally modest, without any bright architectural concepts.
