= Krivoye =

Krivoye or Krivoe (Russian: Кривое) may refer to:

- Krivoye Lake, lake in Chelyabinsk Oblast, Russia
- Krivoye, Vologodsky District, village in Russia
- Krivoye Ozero (disambiguation)

== See also ==
- Kryve
