= Urytva =

Rural locality in Ternopil Oblast, Ukraine

Urytva Уритва
- Location in Ternopil Oblast
- Coordinates: 49°29′31″N 25°11′52″E
- Country: Ukraine
- Oblast: Ternopil Oblast
- Raion: Ternopil Raion
- Hromada: Kozova settlement hromada
- Time zone: UTC+2 (EET)
  - Summer (DST): UTC+3 (EEST)
- Postal code: 47641

Urytva (Ukrainian: Уритва) is a village in the Kozova hromada of the Ternopil Raion of Ternopil Oblast in Ukraine.

== History ==
The village originated as a hamlet of Olesyne in the 19th century.

After the liquidation of the Kozova Raion on 19 July 2020, the village became part of the Ternopil Raion.

== Religion ==
- Church of the Assumption (1996, brick).

== Sources ==
- (in Ukrainian) Мельничук Б., Новосядла Н., Уритва // Ternopil Encyclopedic Dictionary: in 4 v. / editorial board: H. Yavorskyi and other, Ternopil: "Zbruch", 2008, V. 3: П—Я, S. 496. — ISBN 978-966-528-279-2.
- "o wsi w h. Olesin 3.) al. pow. Oleszyn, pow. brzeżański". Geographical Dictionary of the Kingdom of Poland (in Polish). 7. Warszawa: Kasa im. Józefa Mianowskiego. 1886. p. 462.
