= Dmukhivtsi =

Rural locality in Ternopil Oblast, Ukraine

Dmukhivtsi Дмухівці
- Location in Ternopil Oblast
- Coordinates: 49°32′40″N 25°20′12″E
- Country: Ukraine
- Oblast: Ternopil Oblast
- Raion: Ternopil Raion
- Hromada: Kozliv settlement hromada
- Time zone: UTC+2 (EET)
  - Summer (DST): UTC+3 (EEST)
- Postal code: 47683

Dmukhivtsi (Ukrainian: Дмухівці) is a village in Kozliv settlement hromada, Ternopil Raion, Ternopil Oblast, Ukraine.

== History ==
The village was founded as a street in the town of Kozliv in 1467.

After the liquidation of the Kozova Raion on 19 July 2020, the village became part of the Ternopil Raion.

== Religion ==
- St. Demetrius church (1993).

== Sources ==
- "Dmuchawiec". Geographical Dictionary of the Kingdom of Poland (in Polish). 2. Warszawa: Kasa im. Józefa Mianowskiego. 1881. p. 44.
