= Horby, Ternopil Oblast =

Rural locality in Ternopil Oblast, Ukraine

Horby Горби
- Location in Ternopil Oblast
- Coordinates: 49°29′31″N 25°18′21″E
- Country: Ukraine
- Oblast: Ternopil Oblast
- Raion: Ternopil Raion
- Hromada: Kozova settlement hromada
- Time zone: UTC+2 (EET)
  - Summer (DST): UTC+3 (EEST)
- Postal code: 47633

Horby (Ukrainian: Горби) is a village in Kozova settlement hromada, Ternopil Raion, Ternopil Oblast, Ukraine.

== History ==
In 1952, there were 37 yards on the khutir and 138 people lived there.

After the liquidation of the Kozova Raion on 19 July 2020, the village became part of the Ternopil Raion.

== Sources ==
- (in Ukrainian) Завіруха М., Горби // Ternopil Encyclopedic Dictionary: in 4 v. / editorial board: H. Yavorskyi and other, Ternopil: "Zbruch", 2004, V. 1: А—Й, S. 394. — ISBN 966-528-197-6.
