= Yosypivka, Kozova settlement hromada, Ternopil Raion, Ternopil Oblast =

Rural locality in Ternopil Oblast, Ukraine

Yosypivka Йосипівка
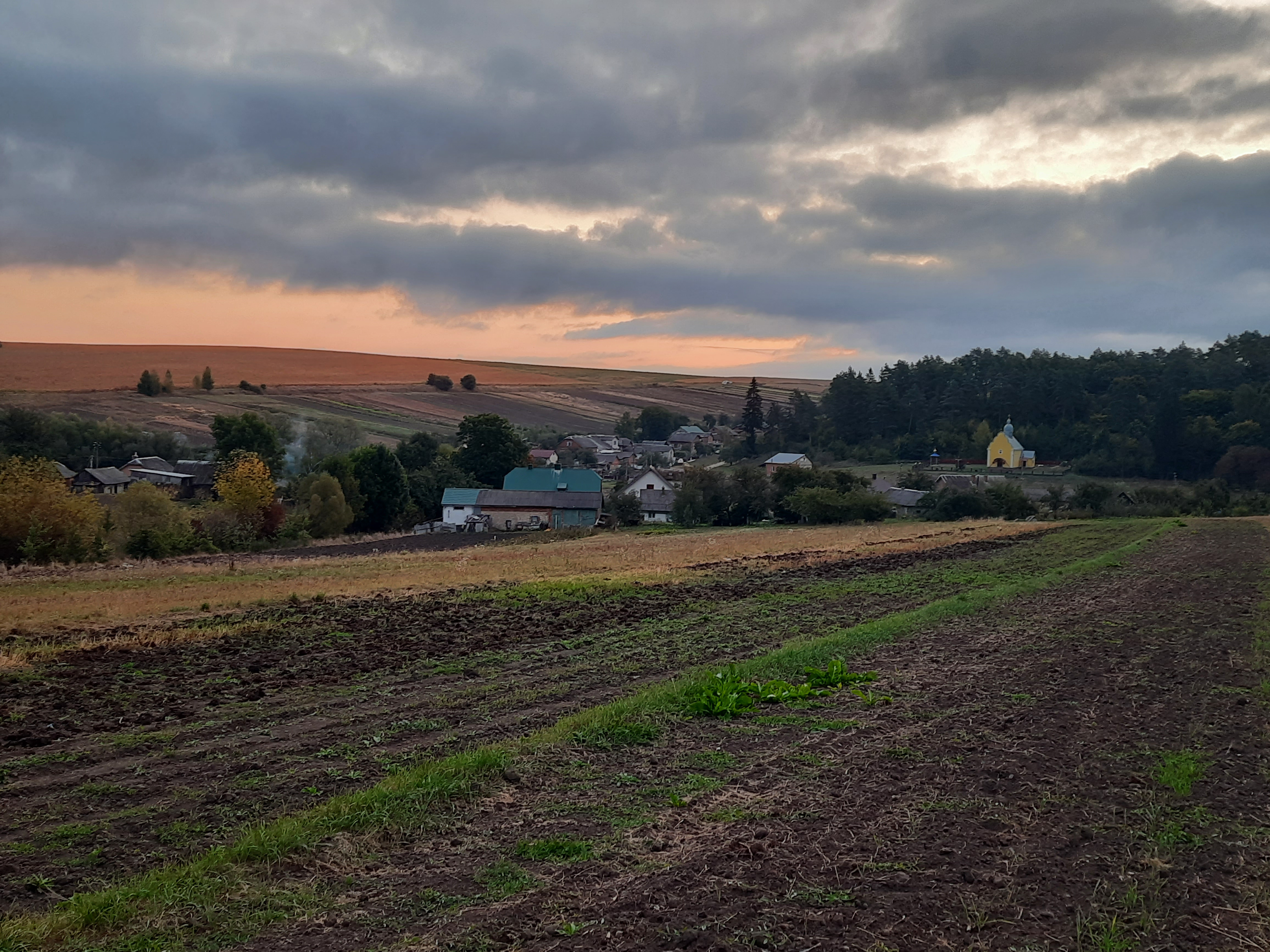

- Location in Ternopil Oblast
- Coordinates: 49°24′1″N 25°8′54″E
- Country: Ukraine
- Oblast: Ternopil Oblast
- Raion: Ternopil Raion
- Hromada: Kozova settlement hromada
- Time zone: UTC+2 (EET)
  - Summer (DST): UTC+3 (EEST)
- Postal code: 47602

Yosypivka (Ukrainian: Йосипівка, Polish: Józefówka) is a village in Kozova settlement hromada, Ternopil Raion, Ternopil Oblast, Ukraine.

== History ==
The village was founded in 1626.

After the liquidation of the Kozova Raion on 19 July 2020, the village became part of the Ternopil Raion.

== Religion ==
- Church of the Transfiguration (2009).

== Sources ==
- "Józefówka, przys. Kupczyńce". Geographical Dictionary of the Kingdom of Poland (in Polish). 3. Warszawa: Kasa im. Józefa Mianowskiego. 1882. p. 613.
