= Mala Plavucha =

Rural locality in Ternopil Oblast, Ukraine

Mala Plavucha Мала Плавуча
- Location in Ternopil Oblast
- Coordinates: 49°35′6″N 25°11′50″E
- Country: Ukraine
- Oblast: Ternopil Oblast
- Raion: Ternopil Raion
- Hromada: Kozova settlement hromada
- Time zone: UTC+2 (EET)
  - Summer (DST): UTC+3 (EEST)
- Postal code: 47621

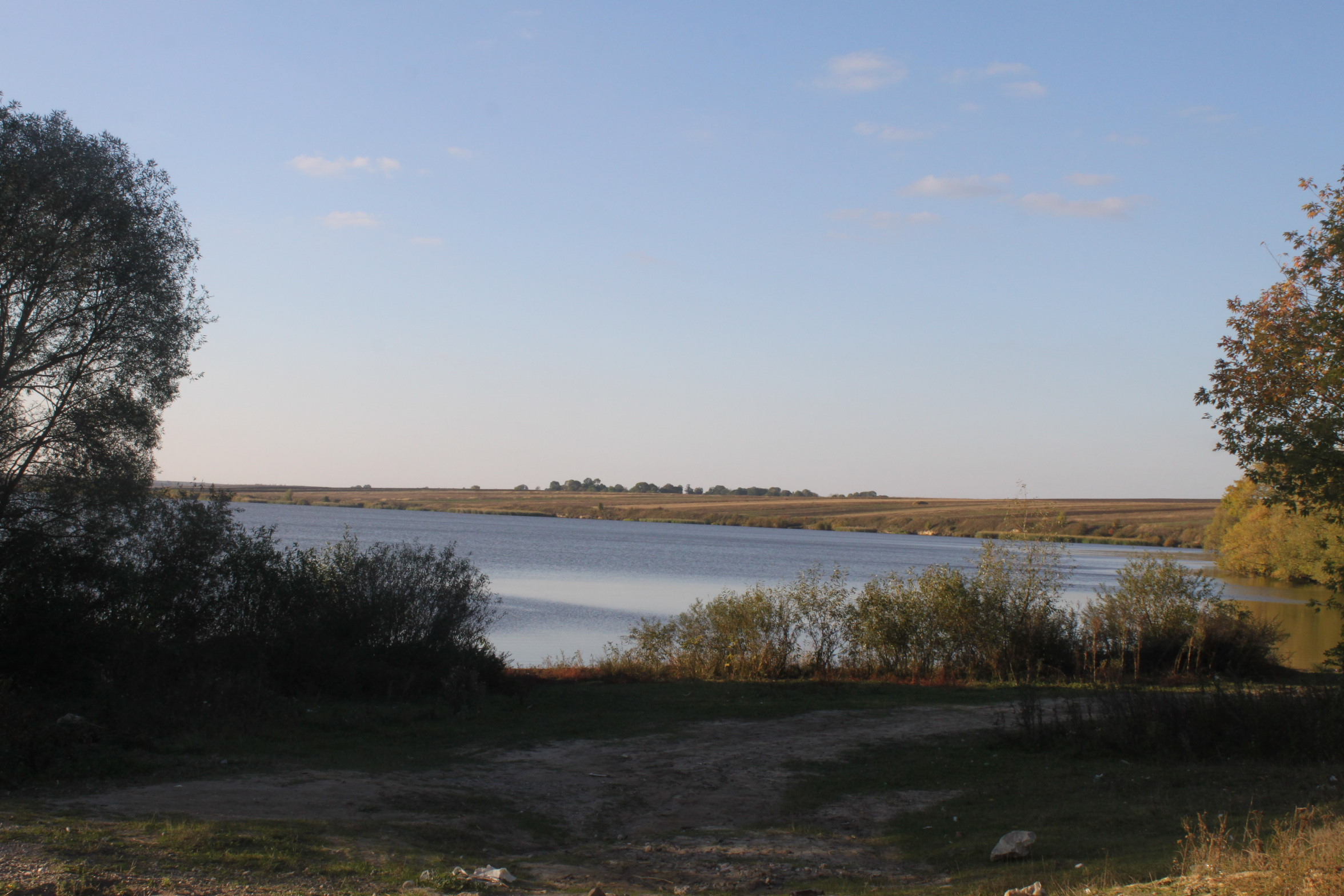
View of the pond on the Strypa River in the village of Mala Plavucha (Ternopil region)

Mala Plavucha (Ukrainian: Мала Плавуча) is a village in Kozova settlement hromada, Ternopil Raion, Ternopil Oblast, Ukraine.

== History ==
The first written mention of the village was in 1615.

After the liquidation of the Kozova Raion on 19 July 2020, the village became part of the Ternopil Raion.

== Religion ==
- Two churches of St. Peter and St. Paul (1878, wooden; 2014, brick).

== Sources ==
- (in Ukrainian) Пегарський М., Мала Плавуча // Ternopil Encyclopedic Dictionary: in 4 v. / editorial board: H. Yavorskyi and other, Ternopil: "Zbruch", 2005, V. 2: К—О, S. 437. — ISBN 966-528-199-2.
