= Hlynna =

Rural locality in Ternopil Oblast, Ukraine

Hlynna Глинна
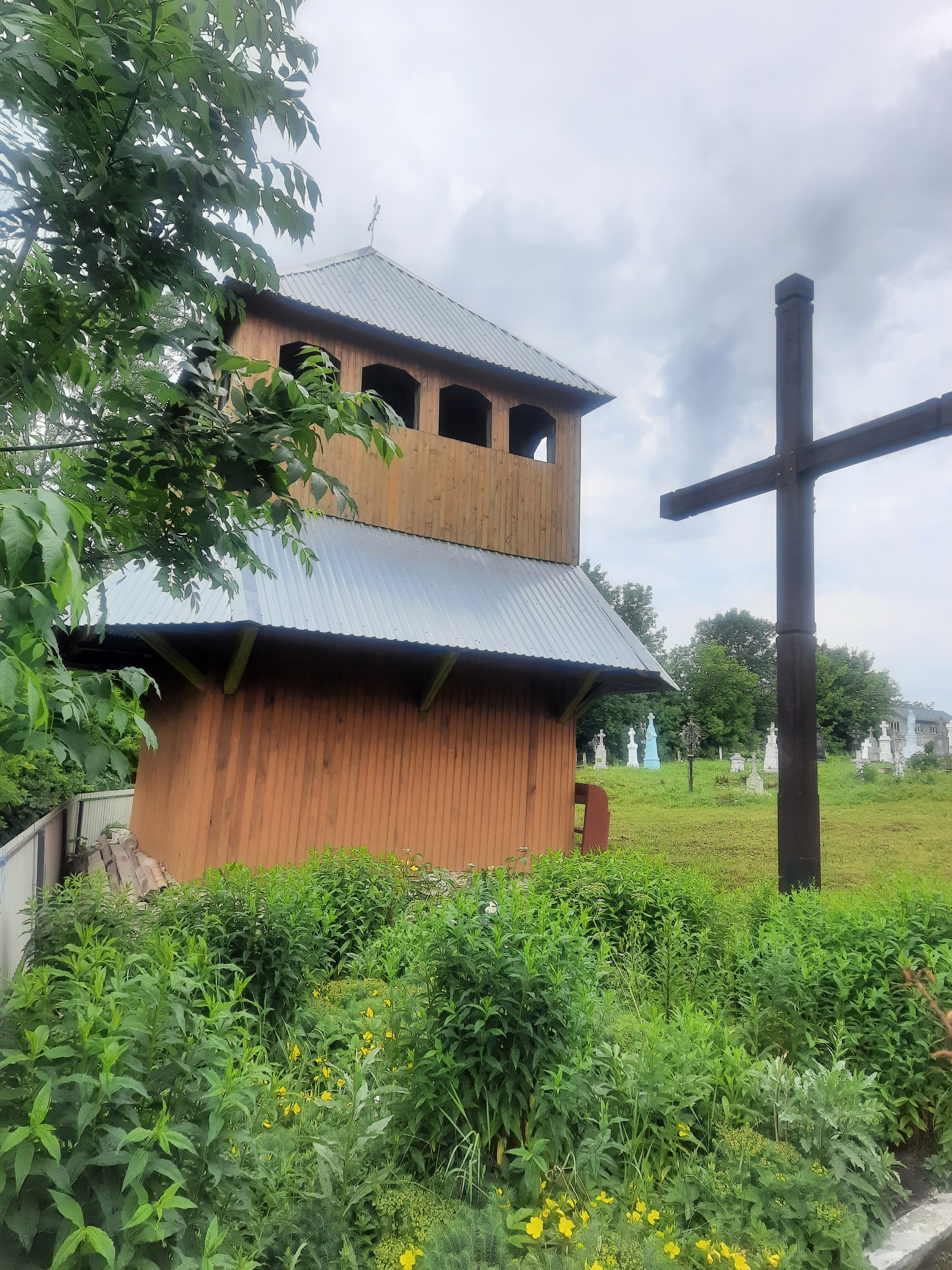

- Location in Ternopil Oblast
- Coordinates: 49°35′20″N 25°10′50″E
- Country: Ukraine
- Oblast: Ternopil Oblast
- Raion: Ternopil Raion
- Hromada: Kozova settlement hromada
- Time zone: UTC+2 (EET)
  - Summer (DST): UTC+3 (EEST)
- Postal code: 47611

Hlynna (Ukrainian: Глинна) is a village in Kozova settlement hromada, Ternopil Raion, Ternopil Oblast, Ukraine.

== History ==
The first written mention of the village was in 1502.

After the liquidation of the Kozova Raion on 19 July 2020, the village became part of the Ternopil Raion.

== Religion ==
- Two churches of St. Michael (1856; 1994).

== Sources ==
- (in Ukrainian) Уніят В., Яворська М., Глинна // Ternopil Encyclopedic Dictionary: in 4 v. / editorial board: H. Yavorskyi and other, Ternopil: "Zbruch", 2004, V. 1: А—Й, S. 363. — ISBN 966-528-197-6.
- "Glinna 3.)". Geographical Dictionary of the Kingdom of Poland (in Polish). 2. Warszawa: Kasa im. Józefa Mianowskiego. 1881. p. 588.
