= Krivoye Ozero =

Krivoye Ozero may refer to:

- Krivoye Lake, a lake in Chelyabinsk Oblast, Russia
- Kryvoye Ozero (village), a village (selo) in the Republic of Tatarstan, Russia
- Kryve Ozero, an urban-type settlement in Mykolaiv Oblast, Ukraine

== See also ==
- Krivoye
- Kryve
