= Kalne =

Kalne (Ukrainian: Кальне) is an inhabited locality in Ukraine and it may refer to:

- Kalne, Lviv Oblast, a village in Stryi Raion, Lviv Oblast
- Kalne, Kozova settlement hromada, Ternopil Raion, Ternopil Oblast, a village in Ternopil Raion, Ternopil Oblast
- Kalne, Zboriv urban hromada, Ternopil Raion, Ternopil Oblast, village in Ternopil Raion, Ternopil Oblast
