= Slobidka, Kozliv settlement hromada, Ternopil Raion, Ternopil Oblast =

Rural locality in Ternopil Oblast, Ukraine

Slobidka Слобідка
- Location in Ternopil Oblast
- Coordinates: 49°30′49″N 25°20′45″E
- Country: Ukraine
- Oblast: Ternopil Oblast
- Raion: Ternopil Raion
- Hromada: Kozliv settlement hromada
- Time zone: UTC+2 (EET)
  - Summer (DST): UTC+3 (EEST)
- Postal code: 47633

Slobidka (Ukrainian: Слобідка) is a village in Kozliv settlement hromada, Ternopil Raion, Ternopil Oblast, Ukraine.

== History ==
The first written mention of the village was in 1467.

After the liquidation of the Kozova Raion on 19 July 2020, the village became part of the Ternopil Raion.

== Religion ==
- Saints Peter and Paul church (1991, brick).

== Sources ==
- (in Ukrainian) Бойко Я., Уніят В., Слобідка // Ternopil Encyclopedic Dictionary: in 4 v. / editorial board: H. Yavorskyi and other, Ternopil: "Zbruch", 2008, V. 3: П—Я, S. 290. — ISBN 978-966-528-279-2.
