= Pokropyvna =

Rural locality in Ternopil Oblast, Ukraine

Pokropyvna Покропивна
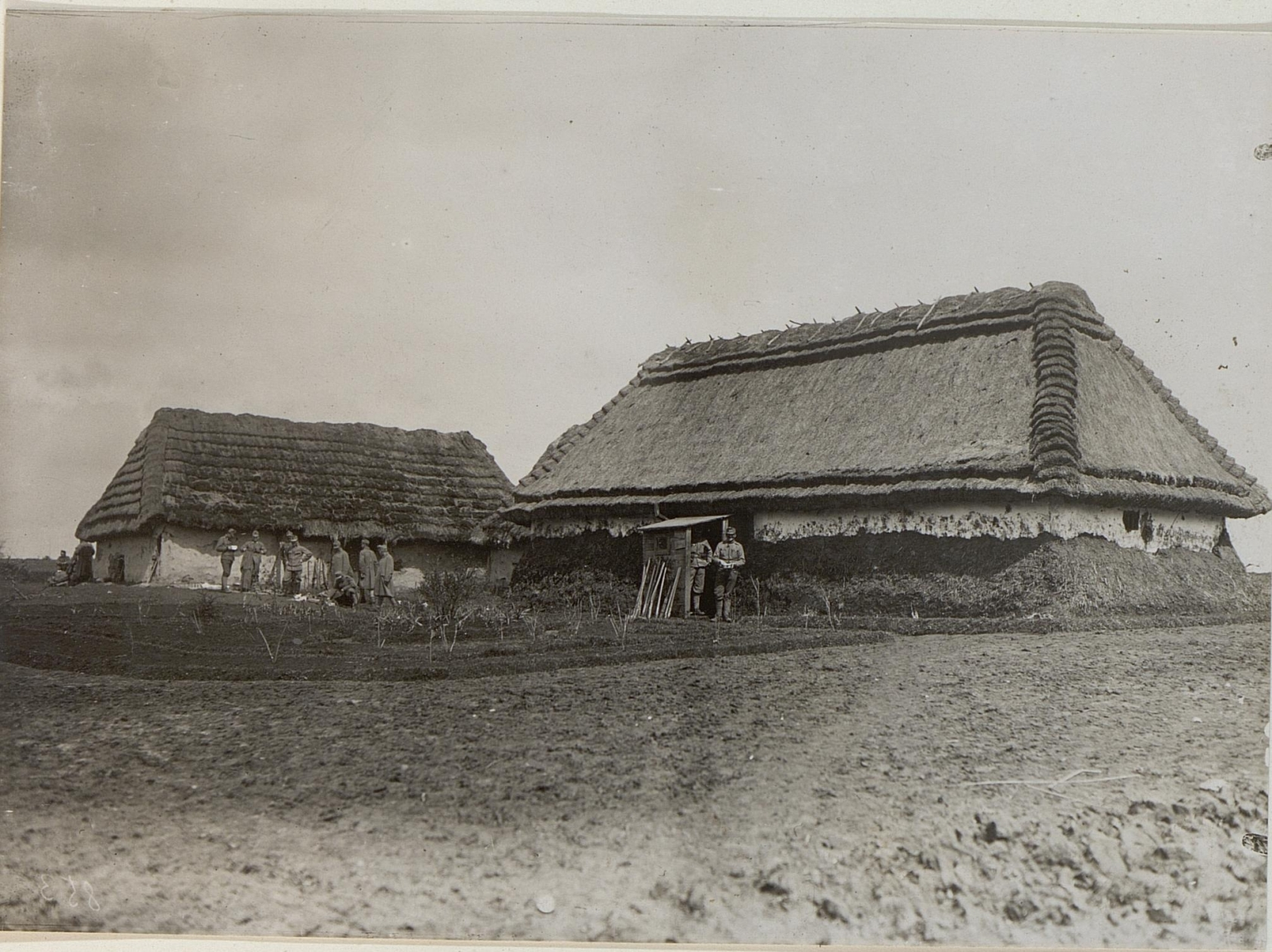
- Houses in Pokropiwna

- Location in Ternopil Oblast
- Coordinates: 49°35′12″N 25°22′11″E
- Country: Ukraine
- Oblast: Ternopil Oblast
- Raion: Ternopil Raion
- Hromada: Kozliv settlement hromada
- Time zone: UTC+2 (EET)
  - Summer (DST): UTC+3 (EEST)
- Postal code: 47630

Pokropyvna (Ukrainian: Покропивна) is a village in Kozliv settlement hromada, Ternopil Raion, Ternopil Oblast, Ukraine.

== History ==
The first written mention of the village was in 1467.

After the liquidation of the Kozova Raion on 19 July 2020, the village became part of the Ternopil Raion.

== Religion ==
- Church of the Nativity of the Blessed Virgin Mary (1884; 1944 - destroyed; 1991 - rebuilt).

== Sources ==
- (in Ukrainian) Гарасимів Г., Уніят В., Покропивна // Ternopil Encyclopedic Dictionary: in 4 v. / editorial board: H. Yavorskyi and other, Ternopil: "Zbruch", 2008, V. 3: П—Я, S. 108. — ISBN 978-966-528-279-2.
- "Pokropiwna". Geographical Dictionary of the Kingdom of Poland (in Polish). 8. Warszawa: Kasa im. Józefa Mianowskiego. 1887. p. 543.
