= Senkiv, Ternopil Raion, Ternopil Oblast =

Rural locality in Ternopil Oblast, Ukraine

Senkiv Сеньків
- Location in Ternopil Oblast
- Coordinates: 49°29′26″N 25°6′19″E
- Country: Ukraine
- Oblast: Ternopil Oblast
- Raion: Ternopil Raion
- Hromada: Kozova settlement hromada
- Time zone: UTC+2 (EET)
  - Summer (DST): UTC+3 (EEST)
- Postal code: 47640

Senkiv (Ukrainian: Сеньків) is a village in the Kozova hromada of the Ternopil Raion of Ternopil Oblast in Ukraine.

== History ==
In 1952, there were 31 yards on the khutir, and 118 people lived there.

After the liquidation of the Kozova Raion on 19 July 2020, the village became part of the Ternopil Raion.

== Sources ==
- (in Ukrainian) Хаварівський Б., Сеньків // Ternopil Encyclopedic Dictionary: in 4 v. / editorial board: H. Yavorskyi and other, Ternopil: "Zbruch", 2008, V. 3: П—Я, S. 346. — ISBN 978-966-528-279-2.
- "Seńków 1.) folw. koło Kuropatnik". Geographical Dictionary of the Kingdom of Poland (in Polish). 10. Warszawa: Kasa im. Józefa Mianowskiego. 1889. p. 432.
- "Seńków 2.), obszar dworski Potoka". Geographical Dictionary of the Kingdom of Poland (in Polish). 10. Warszawa: Kasa im. Józefa Mianowskiego. 1889. p. 432.
