= Vivsia, Ternopil Oblast =

Vivsia Вівся
- Village
- Location within Ukraine
- Coordinates: 49°22′28.63″N 25°13′50.31″E
- Country: Ukraine
- Oblast: Ternopil Oblast
- Raion: Ternopil Raion
- Established: 1785
- Elevation: 380 m (1,250 ft)

Population (2018)
  - Total: 800
- Time zone: UTC+2 (EET)
  - Summer (DST): UTC+3 (EEST)
- Postal code: 47673
- Area code: +380-3547
- Website: Page on Official Website of Verkhovna Rada

Vivsia (Ukrainian: Вівся, Polish: Uwsie) is a village in Ternopil Raion, Ternopil Oblast (province) in western Ukraine. The village is located 9 kilometres (5.6 mi) away from Kozova railway station and 48 kilometres (30 mi) away from Ternopil. Vivsia belongs to Kozova settlement hromada, one of the hromadas of Ukraine. Its population was 800 inhabitants in 2018.

Until 18 July 2020, Vivsia belonged to Kozova Raion. The raion was abolished in July 2020 as part of the administrative reform of Ukraine, which reduced the number of raions of Ternopil Oblast to three. The area of Kozova Raion was merged into Ternopil Raion.

== Etymology ==
Name Vivsia derived from the Ukrainian words овес (oves), вовес (voves), говес (hoves), means avena in English.

== Gallery ==
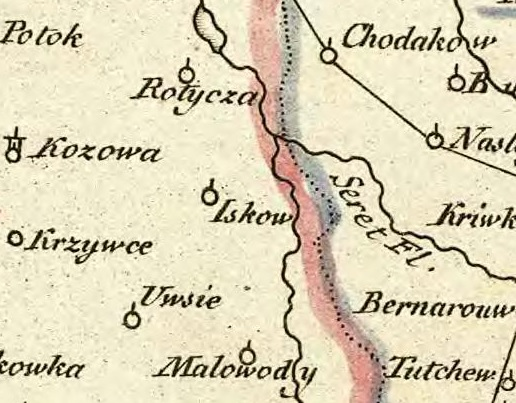
Vivsia on Austrian map, 1790

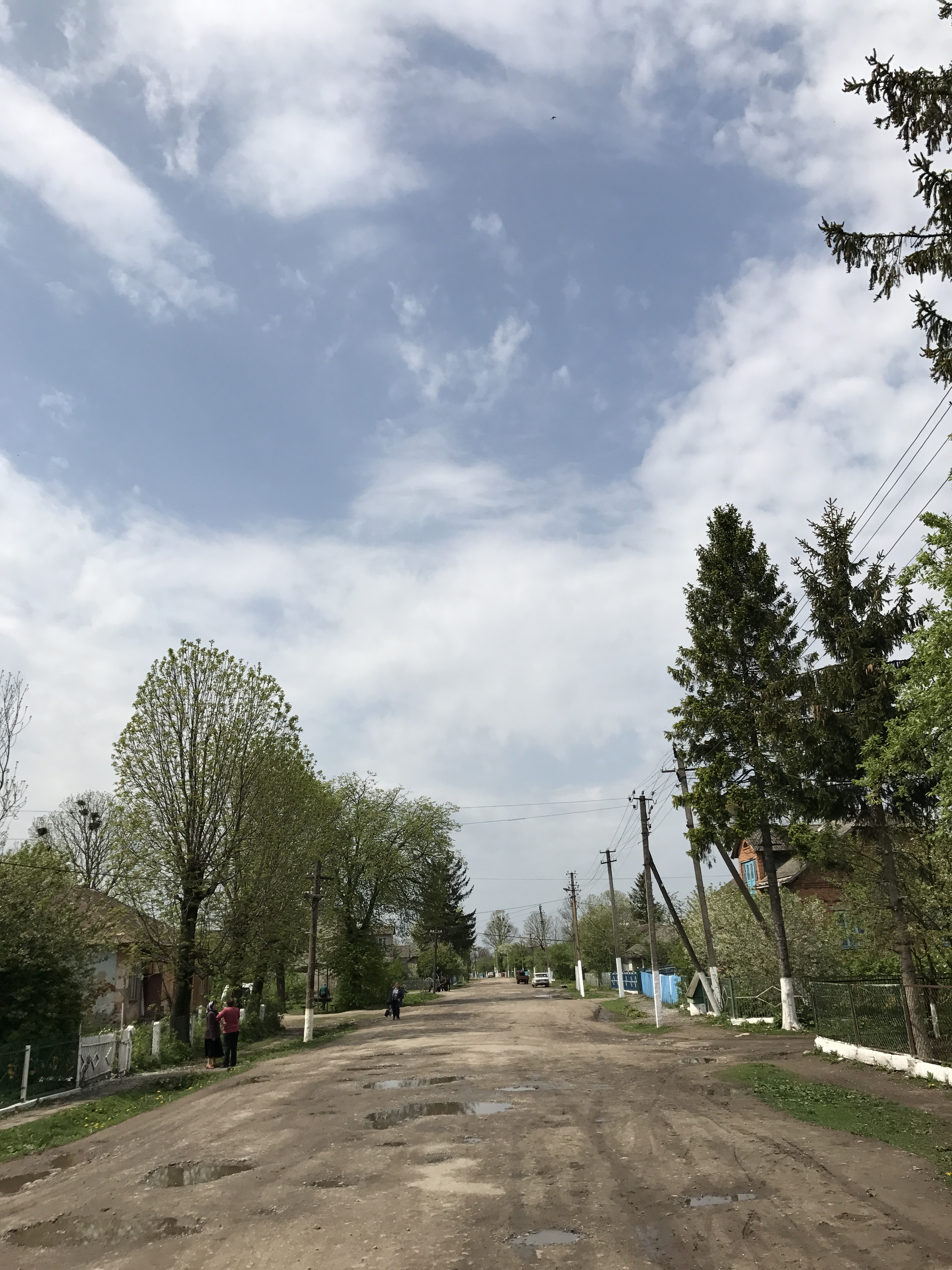
Vivsia during spring

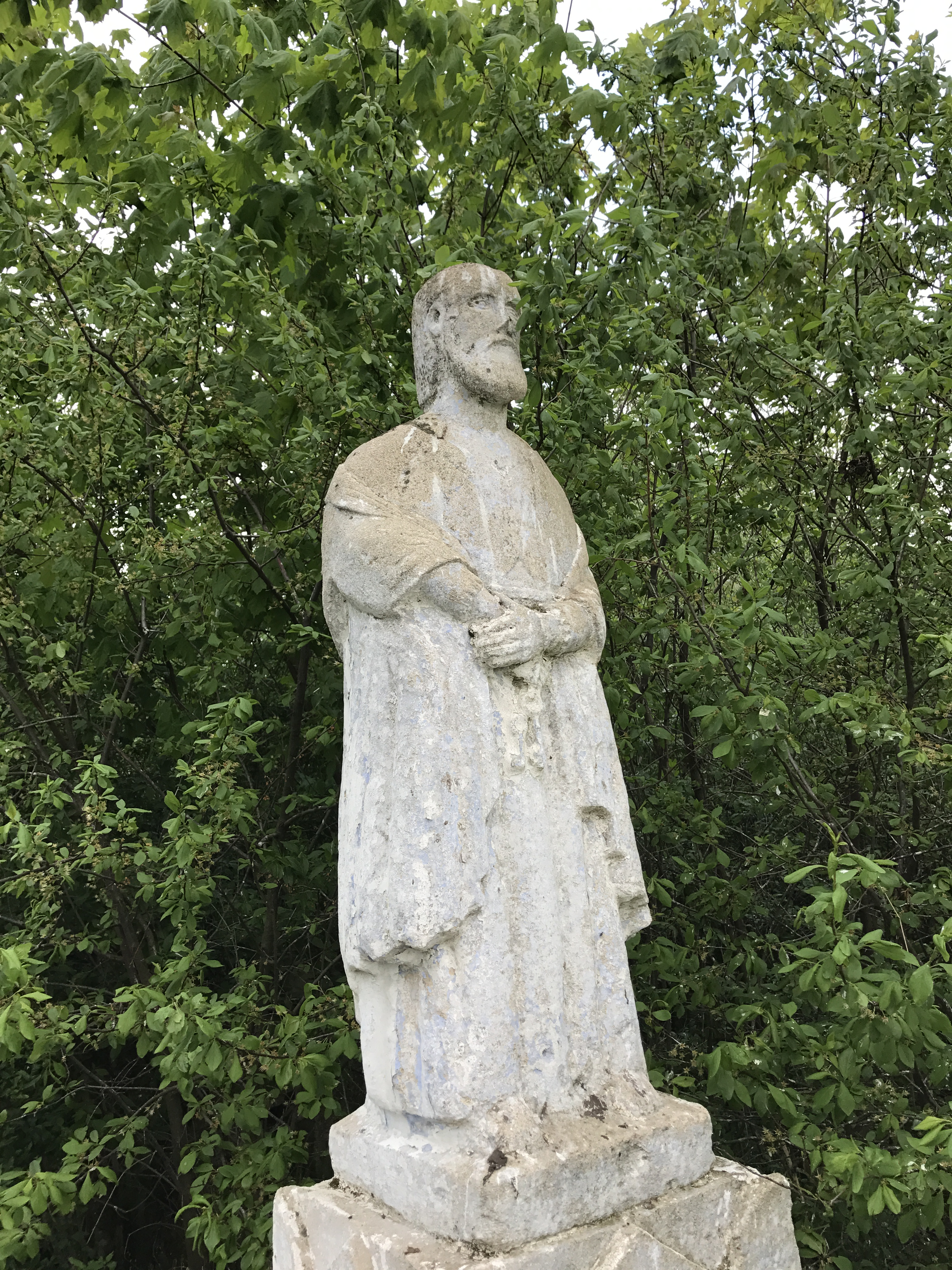
Monument on the old cemetery

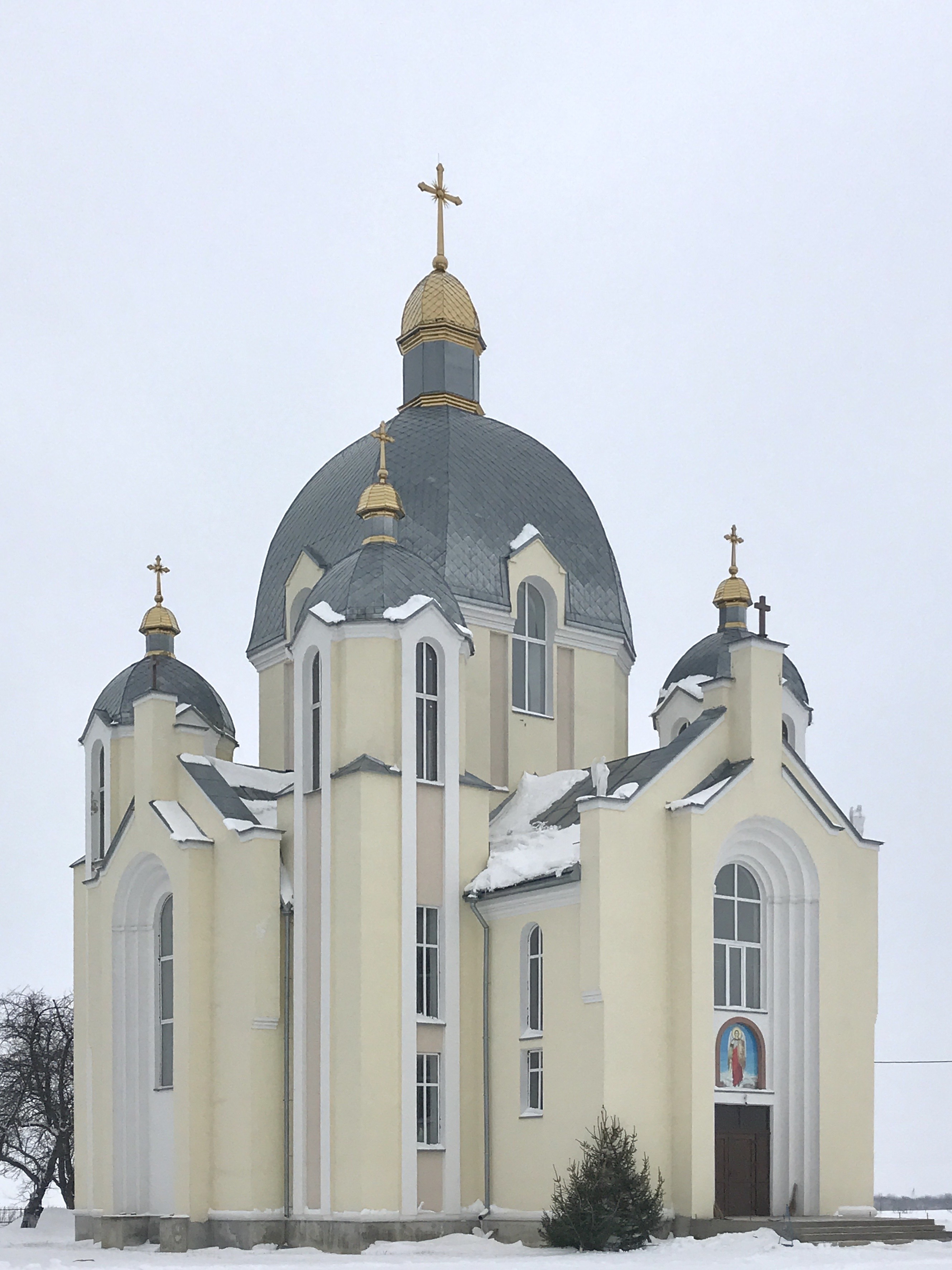
St. Michael church

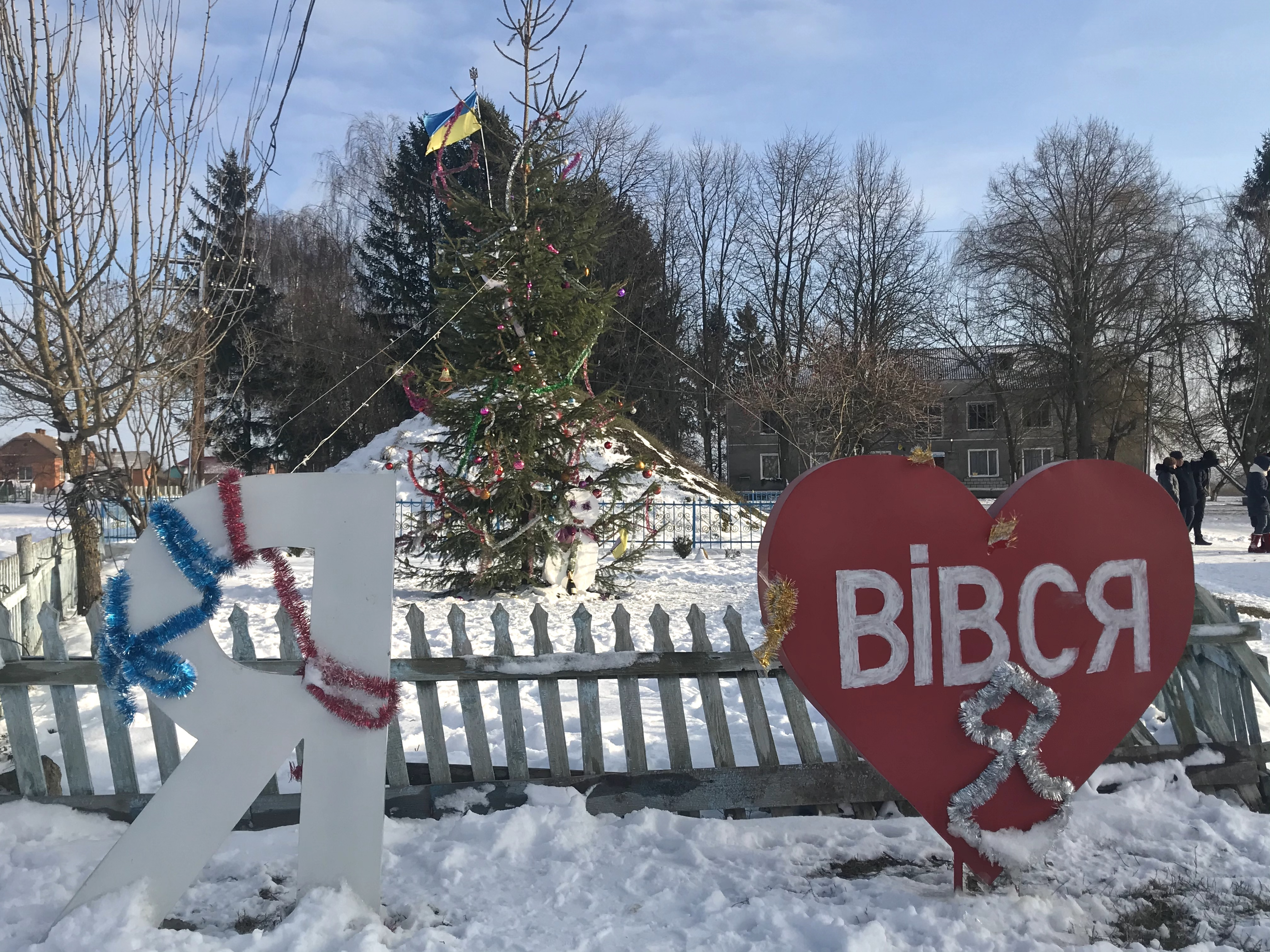
Decorations
