= Potik =

Rural locality in Ternopil Oblast, Ukraine

Potik Потік
- Location in Ternopil Oblast
- Coordinates: 49°30′42″N 25°2′4″E
- Country: Ukraine
- Oblast: Ternopil Oblast
- Raion: Ternopil Raion
- Hromada: Kozova settlement hromada
- Time zone: UTC+2 (EET)
  - Summer (DST): UTC+3 (EEST)
- Postal code: 47684

Potik (Ukrainian: Потік) is a village in the Kozova hromada of the Ternopil Raion of Ternopil Oblast in Ukraine.

== History ==
The first written mention of the village was in 1449. After the liquidation of the Kozova Raion on 19 July 2020, the village became part of the Ternopil Raion.

== Religion ==
- Church of the Holy Martyr Josaphat (1938, brick, UGCC),
- Saint Demetrius church (1998, brick, OCU).

== Sources ==
- (in Ukrainian) Дідух І., Свергун А., Потік // Ternopil Encyclopedic Dictionary: in 4 v. / editorial board: H. Yavorskyi and other, Ternopil: "Zbruch", 2008, V. 3: П—Я, S. 123—124. — ISBN 978-966-528-279-2.
- "Potok (13)". Geographical Dictionary of the Kingdom of Poland (in Polish). 8. Warszawa: Kasa im. Józefa Mianowskiego. 1887. p. 870.
