= Kozova Castle =

Castle in Kozova, Ternopil Oblast, Ukraine

- Козівський замок
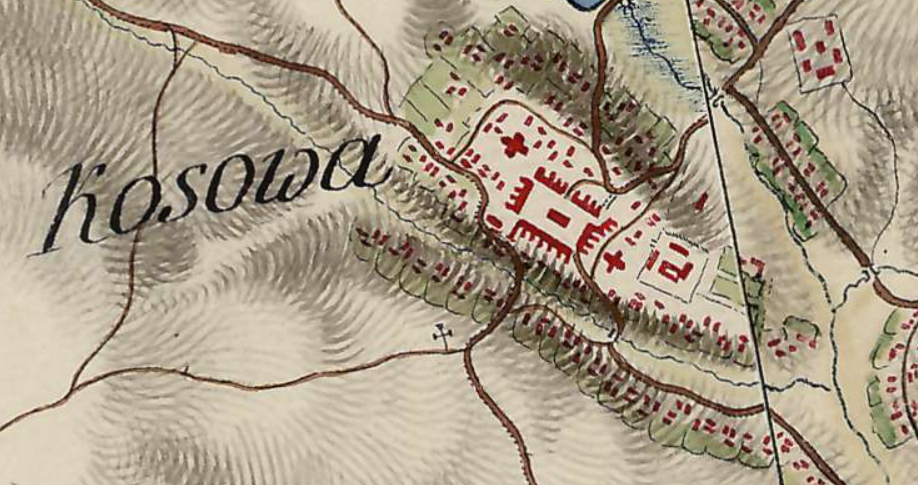
- Kozova Castle on the map by Friedrich von Mieg, 18th century

General information
- Location: Kozova, Ternopil Raion, Ternopil Oblast
- Country: Ukraine
- Coordinates: 49°25′54.9″N 25°08′57.7″E

The Kozova Castle (Ukrainian: Козівський замок, romanized: Kozivs'kyi zamok) is a defensive castle built in Kozova, Ternopil Oblast on the Koropets River in the early 16th century.

== Location ==
The site for the fortification was chosen because of the natural conditions favorable to military defense. The castle was built on a hill, at the confluence of the Koropets River and its small tributary.

== History ==
The castle was built when the town was owned by the noble Potocki family. In 1575, 1589, 1621 and 1626 the castle was attacked by Tatars. Between 6-16 October 1667, during the Battle of Podhajce, Tatar and Turkish troops burned and destroyed the town and the castle. After this event the fortress was not rebuilt again. On 28-29 November 1671, the locality of Kozova was visited by the traveler Ulrich von Werdum, a Frisia, who mentioned the town and the ruined castle in his notes. At the time, the castle's walls and palisades were severely damaged.

Later, the building was the seat of the Muszyński family, owners of the Kozova key at the time, which included several villages and the town of Zavaliv. At the end of the 19th century, the castle was rebuilt for use as a county court, a court prison and a judge's apartment. Today there is no trace of the castle.
