= Viktorivka, Ternopil Oblast =

Rural locality in Ternopil Oblast, Ukraine

Viktorivka Вікторівка
- Location in Ternopil Oblast
- Coordinates: 49°26′33″N 25°11′33″E
- Country: Ukraine
- Oblast: Ternopil Oblast
- Raion: Ternopil Raion
- Hromada: Kozova settlement hromada
- Time zone: UTC+2 (EET)
  - Summer (DST): UTC+3 (EEST)
- Postal code: 47681

Viktorivka (Ukrainian: Вікторівка) is a village in Kozova settlement hromada, Ternopil Raion, Ternopil Oblast, Ukraine.

== History ==
The first written mention of the village was in 1785.

After the liquidation of the Kozova Raion on 19 July 2020, the village became part of the Ternopil Raion.

== Religion ==
- Saint Nicholas church (1992; OCU; brick).

== Sources ==
- (in Ukrainian) Масира, Я., Вікторівка // Ternopil Encyclopedic Dictionary: in 4 v. / editorial board: H. Yavorskyi and other, Ternopil: "Zbruch", 2004, V. 1: А—Й, 696 s. — ISBN 966-528-197-6.
- "Wiktorówka". Geographical Dictionary of the Kingdom of Poland (in Polish). 13. Warszawa: Kasa im. Józefa Mianowskiego. 1893. p. 448.
