= Ploske, Ternopil Raion, Ternopil Oblast =

Rural locality in Ternopil Oblast, Ukraine

Ploske Плоске
- Location in Ternopil Oblast
- Coordinates: 49°27′45″N 25°16′6″E
- Country: Ukraine
- Oblast: Ternopil Oblast
- Raion: Ternopil Raion
- Hromada: Kozova settlement hromada
- Time zone: UTC+2 (EET)
  - Summer (DST): UTC+3 (EEST)
- Postal code: 47652

Ploske (Ukrainian: Плоске) is a village in the Kozova hromada of the Ternopil Raion of Ternopil Oblast in Ukraine.

== History ==
The first written mention of the village was in 1559.

After the liquidation of the Kozova Raion on 19 July 2020, the village became part of the Ternopil Raion.

== Sources ==
- (in Ukrainian) Лашта В., Плоске // Ternopil Encyclopedic Dictionary: in 4 v. / editorial board: H. Yavorskyi and other, Ternopil: "Zbruch", 2008, V. 3: П—Я, S. 97. — ISBN 978-966-528-279-2.
