= Kozova =

Rural locality in Ternopil Oblast, Ukraine

Kozova Козова Kozowa
- Rural settlement
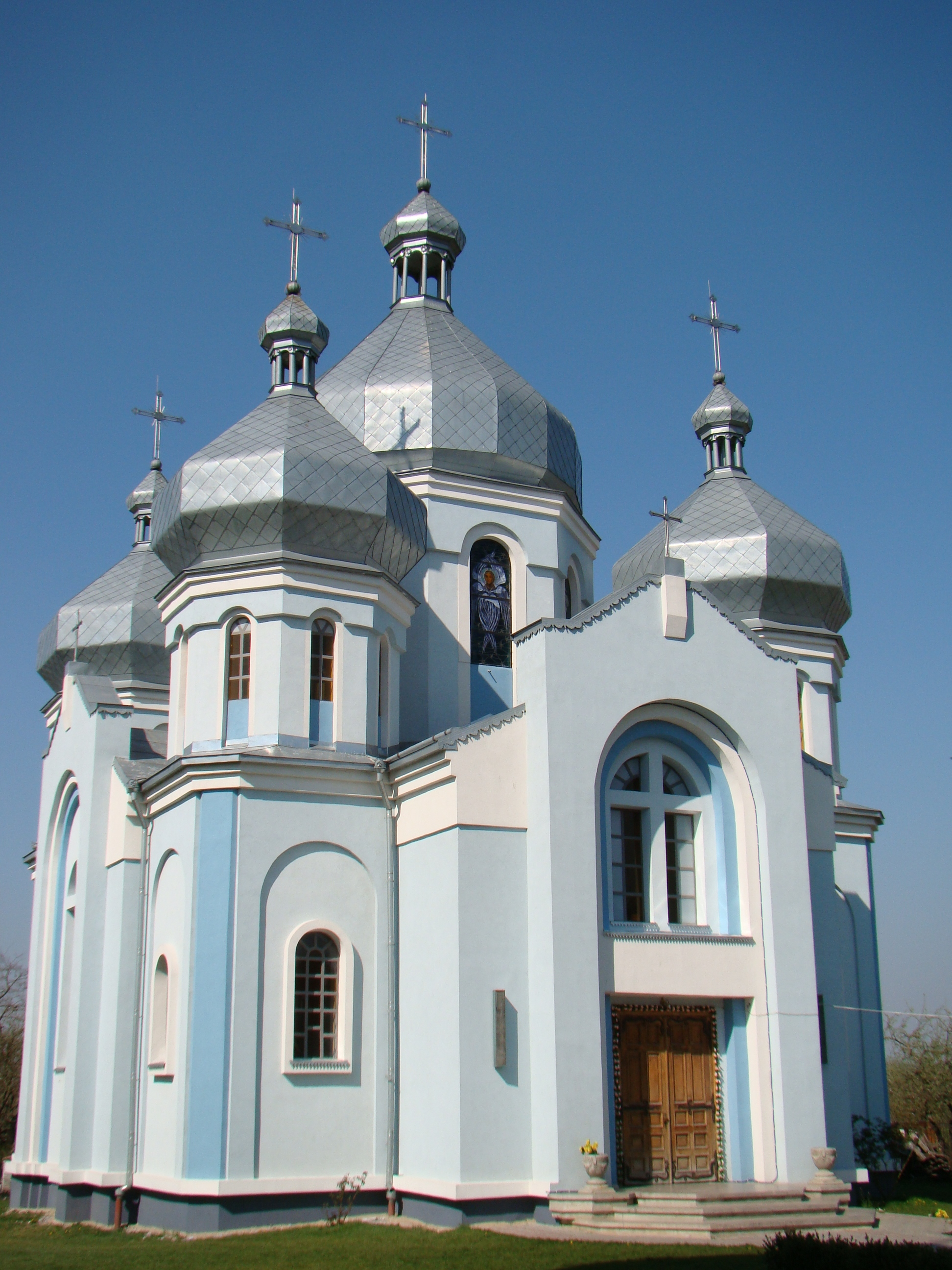
- Church of St. Basil

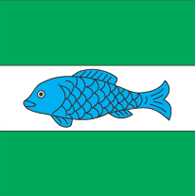
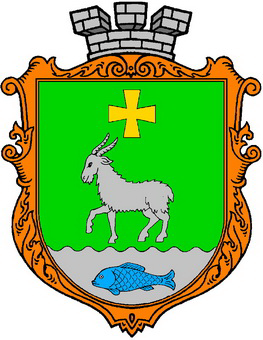
- Flag Coat of arms

- Location of Kozova in Ternopil Oblast Location of Kozova in Ukraine
- Coordinates: 49°25′55″N 25°09′34″E
- Country: Ukraine
- Oblast: Ternopil Oblast
- Raion: Ternopil Raion
- Established: 1440

Area
  - Total: 18 km^{2} (6.9 sq mi)

Population (2022)
  - Total: 8,750
  - Density: 490/km^{2} (1,300/sq mi)
- Postal code: 47600
- Area code: +380 3547
- Climate: Dfb

Kozova (Ukrainian: Козова; Polish: Kozowa; Russian: Козо́ва; Yiddish: קאזעווע) is a rural settlement in Ternopil Raion, Ternopil Oblast, western Ukraine. It is located in the historical region of Galicia, 16 km (10 mi) east of Berezhany, some 30 km (19 mi) west of Ternopil, and 100 km (62 mi) southeast of Lviv. It hosts the administration of Kozova settlement hromada, one of the hromadas of Ukraine. The settlement is situated beside a lake on the Koropets River in the western part of the historical region of Podolia. There is presumption that the name Kozova comes from the Ukrainian word koza (goat), though other possible sources exist. Population: 8,750 (2022 estimate).

== History ==
From 1350 to 1772 Kozova belonged to the Kingdom of Poland, which incorporated territories of the former Kingdom of Galicia and Lodomeria. The first partition of Poland in 1772 attributed Galicia to the Habsburg monarchy. The Weingarten family, influential in Canadian and New York real estate, emigrated from Kozova at the turn of the 20th century.

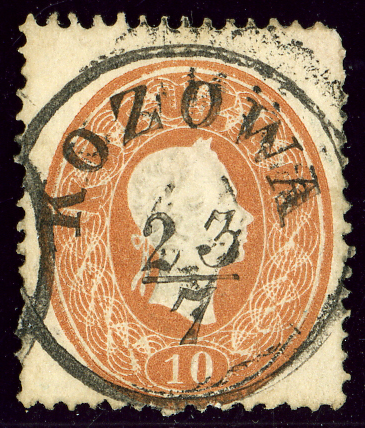
Austrian stamp cancelled around 1861 in KOZOWA (Polish name in Galicia)

During the Kerensky Offensive the Armoured Car Expeditionary Force of the British Royal Navy Air Service established their forward operating base here, close to the headquarters of the 41st Corps of the Russian Imperial Army.

From 1919 to 1939 Kozova was part of the Second Polish Republic. The Polish name Kozowa was used until 1939. Kozova was part of the Soviet Union from 1939 to 1991, interrupted by the period of German occupation, 1941 to 1944.

The population in 1939 was about 5,000, including many Poles and Jews. Upon the German occupation following Operation Barbarossa, the extermination of the town's Jewish population began. After the war's end, the remaining population was almost exclusively Ukrainian, with only a few Poles, Jews and Russians.

Until 18 July 2020, Kozova served as the administrative center of Kozova Raion. The raion was abolished in July 2020 as part of the administrative reform of Ukraine, which reduced the number of raions of Ternopil Oblast to three. The area of Kozova Raion was merged into Ternopil Raion.

Until 26 January 2024, Kozova was designated urban-type settlement. On this day, a new law entered into force which abolished this status, and Kozova became a rural settlement.

== Jews ==
Jews had lived in the town since the end of the 17th century. From the mid-19th century, rabbis from the Rothenberg family served as the head of the community in the town. In a great fire that broke out in 1906, around 300 Jewish families were left homeless.

In 1909, a Hebrew school was established in the town, and between the World Wars, Zionist activity increased there, especially among the Revisionists. During those years about 1,570 Jews lived in the town, about one-third of its inhabitants, and the Jewish community council was dominated by Agudat Yisrael. Jewish public activity in the town was banned after the Soviets occupied the area in September 1939.

=== During the Holocaust ===
On July 3, 1941, during Operation Barbarossa, the town was occupied by the Germans. Following pogroms carried out by Ukrainian peasants against Jews from surrounding villages, many Jewish refugees fled into Kozova. On October 16, 1941, the Germans carried out a massacre of the Jews of the town, murdering between 300 and 500 Jews in a nearby forest.

In the spring of 1942, with the arrival of deported Jews, the Jewish population of the town rose to about 2,850. As more Jews were brought in, all of the town’s Jews were confined to a ghetto that was established there, where conditions were extremely overcrowded.

On September 21, 1942 (Yom Kippur), a mass Aktion was carried out in the ghetto: between 800 and 1,000 Jews were seized and taken to Berezhany, from where they were quickly deported in freight cars to the Belzec extermination camp.

In the winter of 1942–1943, the Jews of the ghetto suffered from a typhus epidemic; German forces executed any Jewish patients they discovered. On April 9, 1943, the Germans executed about 100 more Jews from the ghetto.

On April 17, 1943, another mass Aktion took place in the ghetto, in which about 1,000 Jews were shot to death.

On June 12, 1943, the last 1,000 Jews remaining in the ghetto were murdered. During this Aktion, a member of the Judenrat, attorney Kurczuk, committed suicide together with his nine family members by drinking poison, so as not to fall alive into German hands.

=== After the Holocaust ===
After the war only a few Jews remained in Kozova.

== Economy ==
Kozova Dairy is a major dairy enterprise, with a butter plant that processes 50 tons of milk daily. AGRO Ltd. from Lviv holds majority positions in Kozova Dairy. The town also is known for the sugar refinery, one of the main ones of the region.

== Communications ==
The telephone code for Kozova and the Kozova district is +380 3547. Kozova telephone information service (called Dovidkova in Ukrainian): +380 3547 21222

== Monuments ==
- Ukrainian Greek-Catholic Church Church of Assumption of Theotokos (1885), saint Peter and Paul (2007), saint Basil Great (2001).
- Belfry of Holy Spirit Church in village of Koniukhy, Kozova district.
- Holy Spirit Church in village of Koniukhy, Kozova district.
- Monument to Taras Shevchenko (classical Ukrainian writer and poet) in front of Kozova Children Arts School (Khudozhnya Shkola)

There was a castle in the rural settlement.

== See also ==
- Shtetl, a small town with a large Jewish population in pre-Holocaust Central and Eastern Europe.
