= Mlyntsi (village) =

Rural locality in Ternopil Oblast, Ukraine

Mlyntsi Млинці
- Location in Ternopil Oblast
- Coordinates: 49°29′15″N 25°20′18″E
- Country: Ukraine
- Oblast: Ternopil Oblast
- Raion: Ternopil Raion
- Hromada: Kozova settlement hromada
- Time zone: UTC+2 (EET)
  - Summer (DST): UTC+3 (EEST)
- Postal code: 47633

Mlyntsi (Ukrainian: Млинці) is a village in the Kozova hromada of the Ternopil Raion of Ternopil Oblast in Ukraine.

== History ==
Until 1987 the village was a khutir.

After the liquidation of the Kozova Raion on 19 July 2020, the village became part of the Ternopil Raion.

== Sources ==
- (in Ukrainian) Свергун В., Млинці // Ternopil Encyclopedic Dictionary: in 4 v. / editorial board: H. Yavorskyi and other, Ternopil: "Zbruch", 2005, V. 2: К—О, S. 541. — ISBN 966-528-199-2.
- "Młyniec (1), cz. w. Horodyszcze". Geographical Dictionary of the Kingdom of Poland (in Polish). 6. Warszawa: Kasa im. Józefa Mianowskiego. 1885. p. 543.
