= Zalissia, Ternopil Raion, Ternopil Oblast =

Rural locality in Ternopil Oblast, Ukraine

Zalissia Залісся
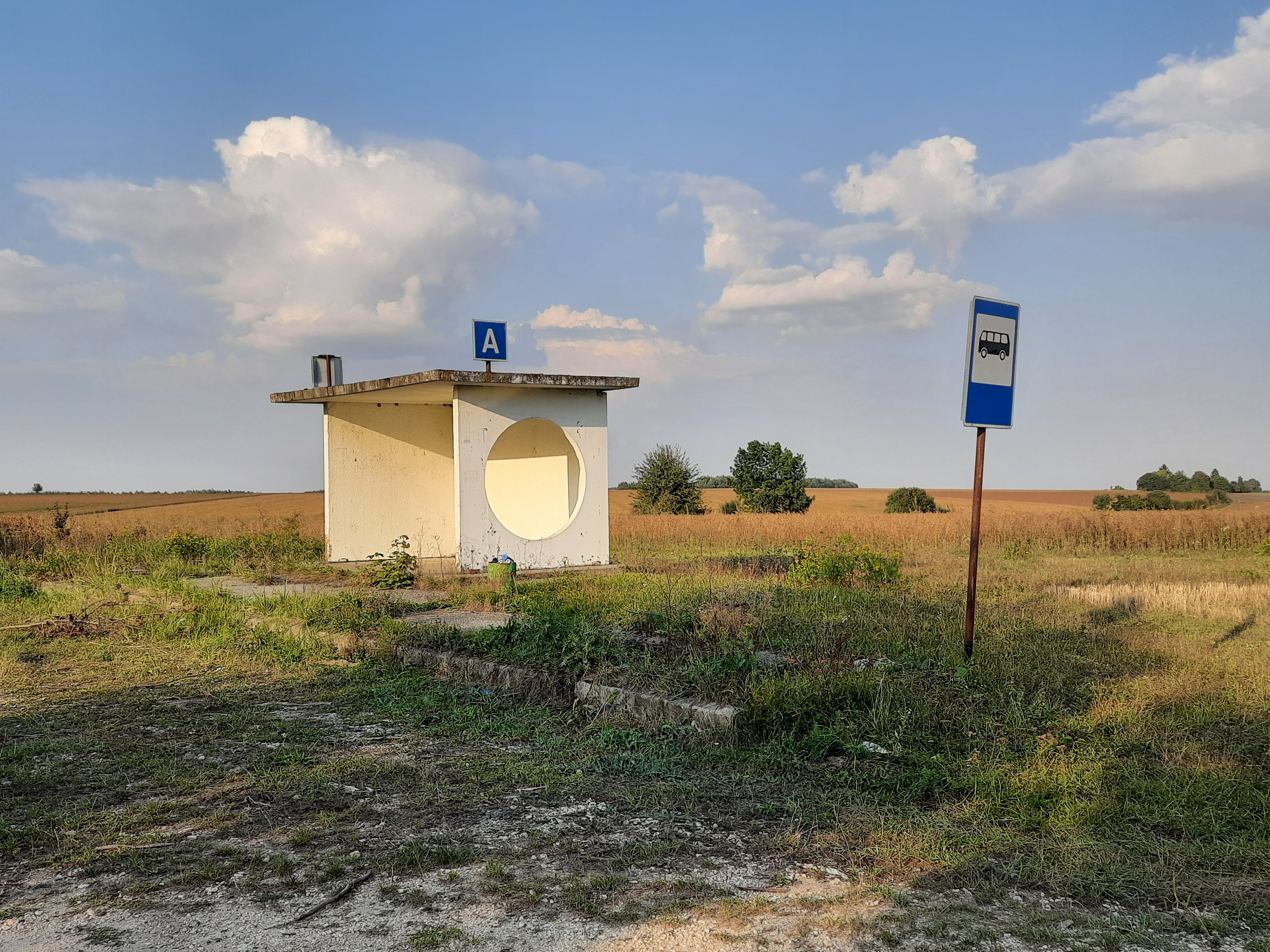
- Bus stop in Zalissya, Ternopil district

- Location in Ternopil Oblast
- Coordinates: 49°35′12″N 25°0′15″E
- Country: Ukraine
- Oblast: Ternopil Oblast
- Raion: Ternopil Raion
- Hromada: Kozova settlement hromada
- Time zone: UTC+2 (EET)
  - Summer (DST): UTC+3 (EEST)
- Postal code: 47612

Zalissia (Ukrainian: Залісся) is a village in Kozova settlement hromada, Ternopil Raion, Ternopil Oblast, Ukraine.

== History ==
The village was founded in the late 19th century.

After the liquidation of the Kozova Raion on 19 July 2020, the village became part of the Ternopil Raion.

== Religion ==
- Church of the Ascension (1994).

== Sources ==
- (in Ukrainian) Ханас В., Залісся // Ternopil Encyclopedic Dictionary: in 4 v. / editorial board: H. Yavorskyi and other, Ternopil: "Zbruch", 2004, V. 1: А—Й, S. 607. — ISBN 966-528-197-6.
