= Makovysko =

Rural locality in Ternopil Oblast, Ukraine

Makovysko Маковисько
- Location in Ternopil Oblast
- Coordinates: 49°23′4″N 25°10′30″E
- Country: Ukraine
- Oblast: Ternopil Oblast
- Raion: Ternopil Raion
- Hromada: Kozova settlement hromada
- Time zone: UTC+2 (EET)
  - Summer (DST): UTC+3 (EEST)
- Postal code: 47672

Makovysko (Ukrainian: Маковисько) is a village in Kozova settlement hromada, Ternopil Raion, Ternopil Oblast, Ukraine.

== History ==
The village was founded in 1938 as a khutir.

After the liquidation of the Kozova Raion on 19 July 2020, the village became part of the Ternopil Raion.

== Sources ==
- (in Ukrainian) Свергун В., Маковисько // Ternopil Encyclopedic Dictionary: in 4 v. / editorial board: H. Yavorskyi and other, Ternopil: "Zbruch", 2005, V. 2: К—О, S. 431. — ISBN 966-528-199-2.
