= Tauriv =

Rural locality in Ternopil Oblast, Ukraine

Tauriv Таурів
- Location in Ternopil Oblast
- Coordinates: 49°32′30″N 25°16′38″E
- Country: Ukraine
- Oblast: Ternopil Oblast
- Raion: Ternopil Raion
- Hromada: Kozliv Hromada
- Time zone: UTC+2 (EET)
  - Summer (DST): UTC+3 (EEST)
- Postal code: 47622

Tauriv (Ukrainian: Таурів) is a village in Kozliv settlement hromada, Ternopil Raion, Ternopil Oblast, Ukraine.

== History ==
The first written mention dates from 1467.

== Religion ==
- Church of the Holy Spirit (1907, brick)
