= Plotycha =

Plotycha (Ukrainian: Плотича) is a name of several populated places in Ukraine:

- Plotycha, Bila rural hromada, Ternopil Raion, Ternopil Oblast
- Plotycha, Kozova settlement hromada, Ternopil Raion, Ternopil Oblast
