= Dybshche =

Rural locality in Ternopil Oblast, Ukraine

Dybshche Дибще
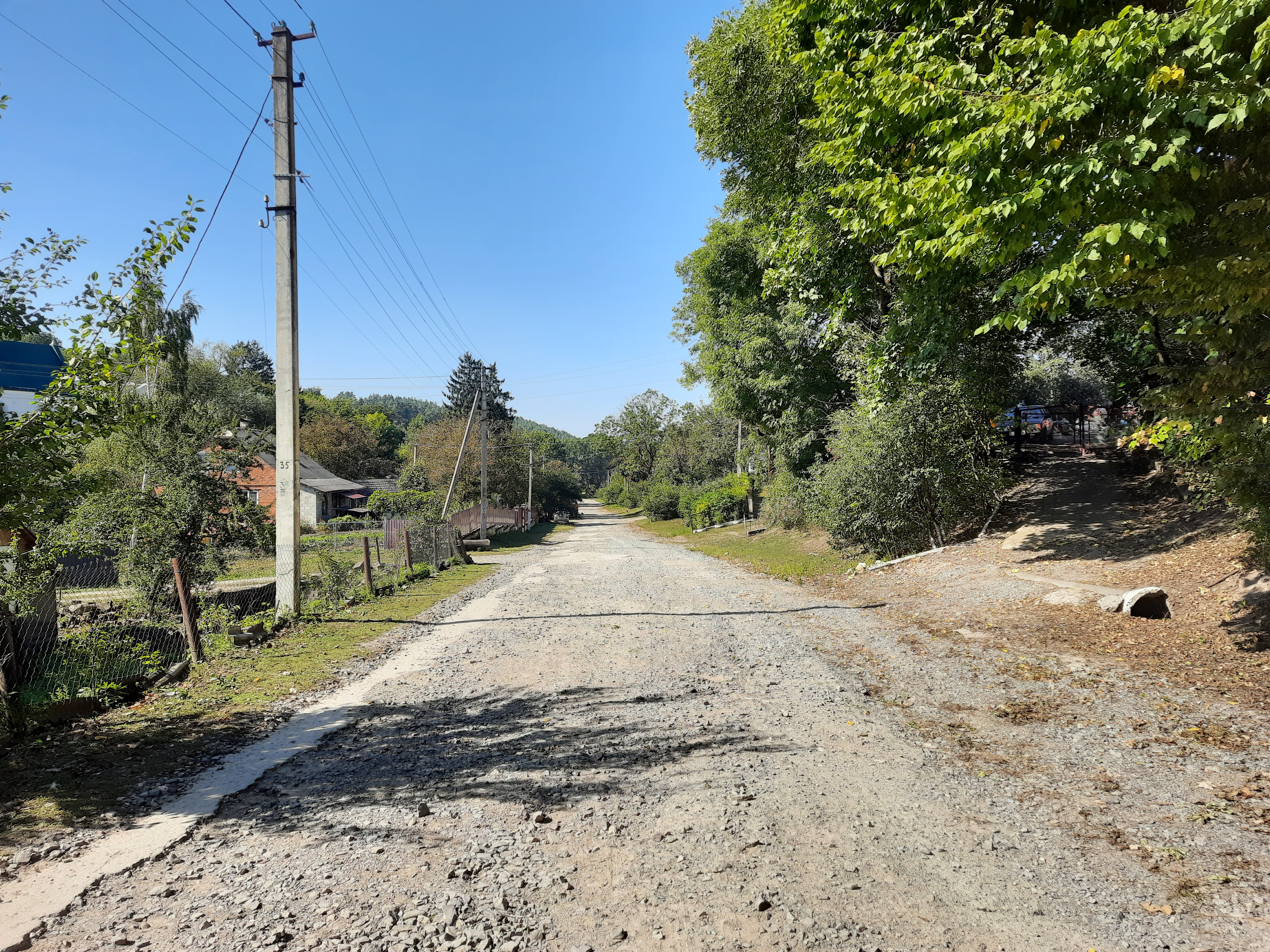

- Location in Ternopil Oblast
- Coordinates: 49°26′21″N 25°5′1″E
- Country: Ukraine
- Oblast: Ternopil Oblast
- Raion: Ternopil Raion
- Hromada: Kozova settlement hromada
- Time zone: UTC+2 (EET)
  - Summer (DST): UTC+3 (EEST)
- Postal code: 47643

Dybshche (Ukrainian: Дибще) is a village in Kozova settlement hromada, Ternopil Raion, Ternopil Oblast, Ukraine.

== History ==
The first written mention of the village was in 1447.

After the liquidation of the Kozova Raion on 19 July 2020, the village became part of the Ternopil Raion.

== Religion ==
- St. Paraskeva church (1873, brick).

== Sources ==
- "Dubszcze". Geographical Dictionary of the Kingdom of Poland (in Polish). 2. Warszawa: Kasa im. Józefa Mianowskiego. 1881. p. 206.
