= Mykhailo Svitenkyi =

Ukrainian priest (1858–1936)

- Михайло Світенький
- Born: 8 November 1858; Teofipilka, Austrian Empire (now Ternopil Oblast, Ukraine)
- Died: 15 June 1936 (aged 77); Ladychyn, Second Polish Republic (now Ternopil Oblast, Ukraine)

Mykhailo Svitenkyi (Ukrainian: Михайло Світенький; 8 November 1858, Teofipilka, Austrian Empire – 15 June 1936, Ladychyn, Poland) was a Ukrainian priest and public figure.

== Biography ==
Graduated from Berezhany gymnasium (1880), studied theology in Lviv (1884).

On 18 December 1884 he was ordained a priest. Served as a staff member in the villages of Tovste (1885–1887, near Hrymailiv) and Ladychyn (1887–1893), as a parish priest in Vovkiv (1893–1897); vice-dean of the Shchyrets Deanery (from 1894); catechist at the selective school in Lviv (1897–1898); military chaplain in Przemyśl (1898-1901); and as a parish priest in Ladychyn (1901–1936).

During 1897–1898, he was the editor of the Christian social newspaper Ruslan.

Active in public organizations in Ternopil and Terebovlia Powiat; a well-known speaker and preacher in Galicia (his contemporaries called him Zolotoust). Fr. Mykhailo sermons were heard at the funerals of Marko Kahanets (now Koropets, Chortkiv Raion), Adam Kotsko (Lviv), and the first anniversary of Ivan Franko's death (1917, Ternopil).

Founded Prosvita reading rooms, agricultural clubs, and cooperatives in the surrounding villages. Organized the construction of churches in Kryvky and Ludvykivtsi, and the repair of the church in Ladychyn. He supported the Lviv literary group Moloda Muza.

Father Svetenkyi was visited by Petro Karmanskyi.

== Family ==
With his wife, he raised three children. As of 1901, he was a widower.

== Awards ==
- Bronze Jubilee Medal of 1898 (Austria-Hungary, 1898)
