= Plotycha, Kozova settlement hromada, Ternopil Raion, Ternopil Oblast =

Rural locality in Ternopil Oblast, Ukraine

Plotycha Плотича
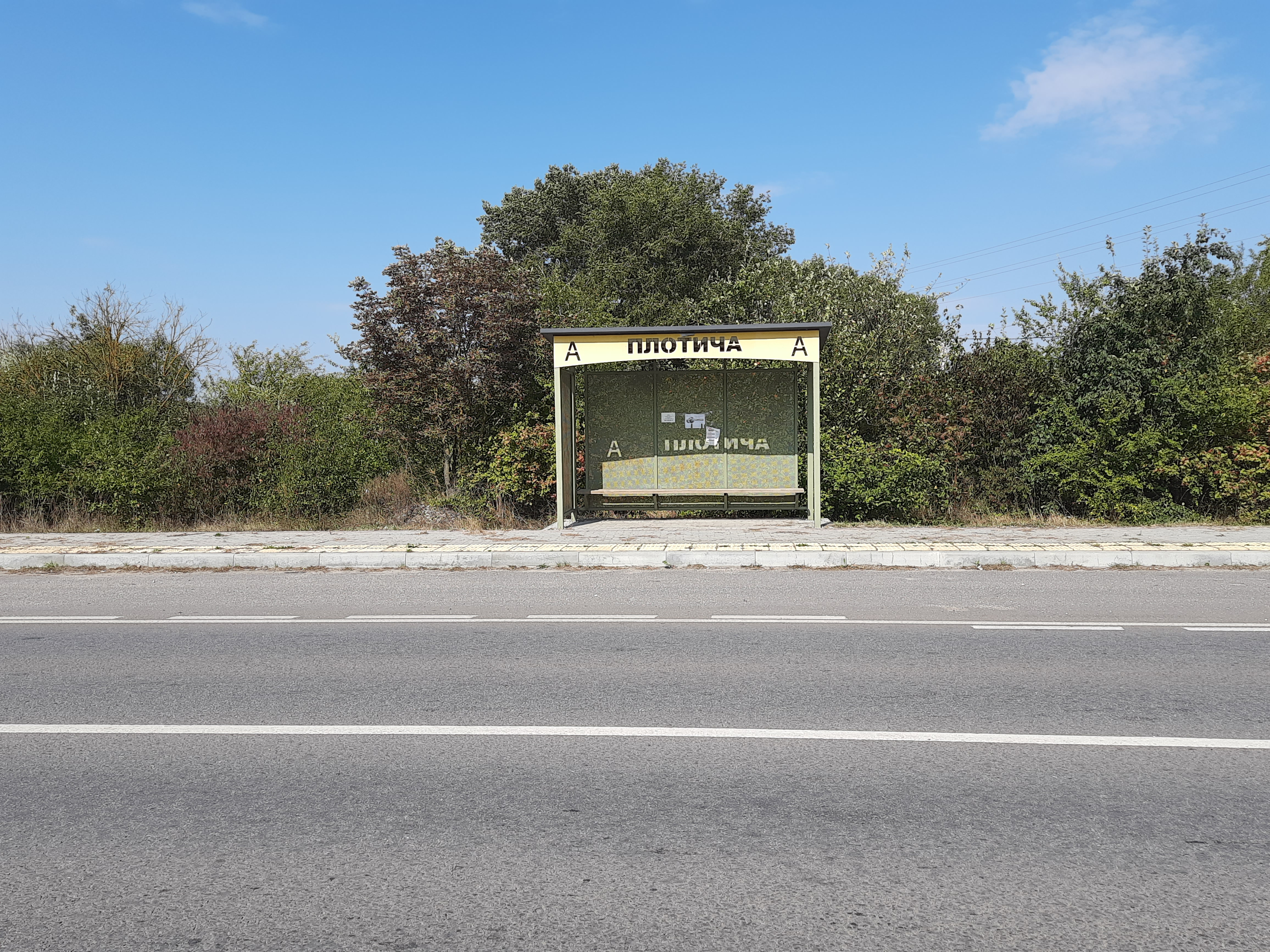
- Bus stop in Plotycha

- Location in Ternopil Oblast
- Coordinates: 49°29′10″N 25°17′48″E
- Country: Ukraine
- Oblast: Ternopil Oblast
- Raion: Ternopil Raion
- Hromada: Kozova settlement hromada
- Time zone: UTC+2 (EET)
  - Summer (DST): UTC+3 (EEST)
- Postal code: 47650

Plotycha (Ukrainian: Плотича) is a village in the Kozova hromada of the Ternopil Raion of Ternopil Oblast in Ukraine.

== History ==
The first written mention of the village was in 1456.

After the liquidation of the Kozova Raion on 19 July 2020, the village became part of the Ternopil Raion.

== Religion ==
- Church of the Nativity of the Blessed Virgin Mary (early second half of the 17th century, wooden),
- Church of the Candlemas (2008).

== Sources ==
- (in Ukrainian) Бігус М., Савич С., Плотича // Ternopil Encyclopedic Dictionary: in 4 v. / editorial board: H. Yavorskyi and other, Ternopil: "Zbruch", 2008, V. 3: П—Я, S. 97. — ISBN 978-966-528-279-2.
- "Płotycza (2)". Geographical Dictionary of the Kingdom of Poland (in Polish). 8. Warszawa: Kasa im. Józefa Mianowskiego. 1887. p. 322—323.
