= Tseniv =

Rural locality in Ternopil Oblast, Ukraine

Tseniv Ценів
- Location in Ternopil Oblast Tseniv (Ternopil Oblast)
- Coordinates: 49°30′35″N 25°6′3″E
- Country: Ukraine
- Oblast: Ternopil Oblast
- Raion: Ternopil Raion
- Hromada: Kozova settlement hromada
- Time zone: UTC+2 (EET)
  - Summer (DST): UTC+3 (EEST)
- Postal code: 47640

Tseniv (Ukrainian: Ценів) is a village in the Kozova hromada of the Ternopil Raion of Ternopil Oblast in Ukraine.

== History ==
The first written mention of the village was in 1437.

After the liquidation of the Kozova Raion on 19 July 2020, the village became part of the Ternopil Raion.

== Religion ==
- Two churches of St. Michael (1760, wooden, restored in 1873 and 1972; 1997, brick).

== Sources ==
- (in Ukrainian) Свергун В., Ценів // Ternopil Encyclopedic Dictionary: in 4 v. / editorial board: H. Yavorskyi and other, Ternopil: "Zbruch", 2008, V. 3: П—Я, S. 570. — ISBN 978-966-528-279-2.
- "Ceniów". Geographical Dictionary of the Kingdom of Poland (in Polish). 1. Warszawa: Kasa im. Józefa Mianowskiego. 1880. p. 533.
