= Teofipilka =

Rural locality in Ternopil Oblast, Ukraine

Teofipilka Теофіпілка
- Location in Ternopil Oblast
- Coordinates: 49°27′15″N 25°12′48″E
- Country: Ukraine
- Oblast: Ternopil Oblast
- Raion: Ternopil Raion
- Hromada: Kozova Hromada
- Time zone: UTC+2 (EET)
  - Summer (DST): UTC+3 (EEST)
- Postal code: 47652

Teofipilka (Ukrainian: Теофіпілка) is a village in Kozova settlement hromada, Ternopil Raion, Ternopil Oblast, Ukraine.

== History ==
The first written mention of the village was in 1785.

After the liquidation of the Kozova Raion on 19 July 2020, the village became part of the Ternopil Raion.

== Religion ==
- Church of the Nativity of John the Baptist (1998, brick, UGCC)
- Church (1921, not preserved, destroyed in 1966, RCC)

== Notable residents ==
- Mykhailo Svitenkyi (1858–1936), Ukrainian priest and public figure
