= Shchepaniv =

Rural locality in Ternopil Oblast, Ukraine

Shchepaniv Щепанів
- Location in Ternopil Oblast
- Coordinates: 49°22′22″N 25°6′45″E
- Country: Ukraine
- Oblast: Ternopil Oblast
- Raion: Ternopil Raion
- Hromada: Kozova settlement hromada
- Time zone: UTC+2 (EET)
  - Summer (DST): UTC+3 (EEST)
- Postal code: 47671

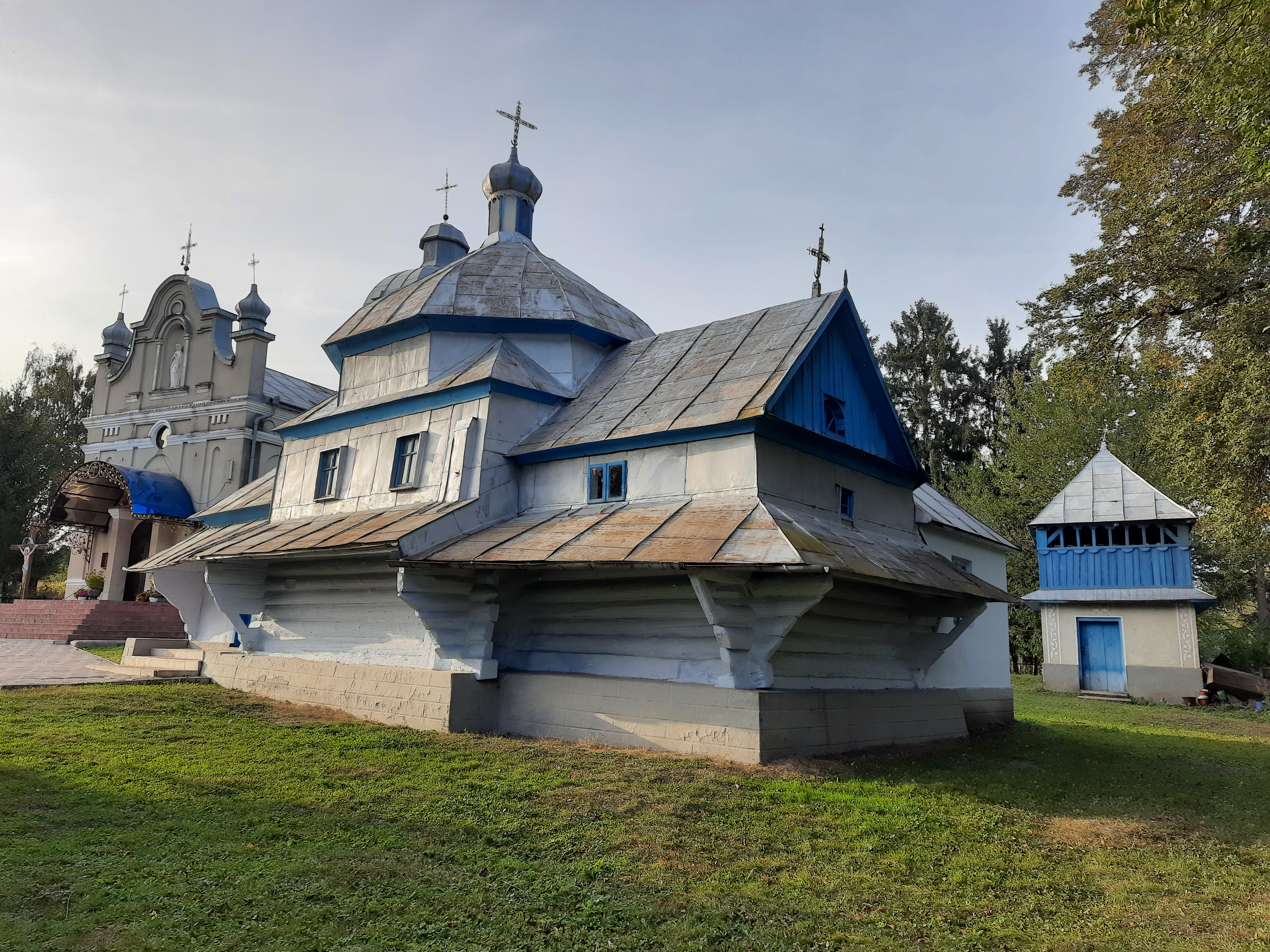
Church of the Presentation of the Blessed Virgin Mary (1638) Shchepaniv Ternopil district, Ternopil region

Shchepaniv (Ukrainian: Щепанів) is a village in the Kozova hromada of the Ternopil Raion of Ternopil Oblast in Ukraine.

== History ==
The first written mention of the village was in 1638.

After the liquidation of the Kozova Raion on 19 July 2020, the village became part of the Ternopil Raion.

== Religion ==
- Two churches of the Presentation of the Blessed Virgin Mary (1638, wooden; 1995, brick).

== Sources ==
- (in Ukrainian) Мельничук Б., Черемшинський О., Щепанів // Ternopil Encyclopedic Dictionary: in 4 v. / editorial board: H. Yavorskyi and other, Ternopil: "Zbruch", 2008, V. 3: П—Я, S. 665–666. — ISBN 978-966-528-279-2.
- "Szczepanów, wś, pow. podhajecki". Geographical Dictionary of the Kingdom of Poland (in Polish). 11. Warszawa: Kasa im. Józefa Mianowskiego. 1890. p. 843.
