= Vymyslivka =

Rural locality in Ternopil Oblast, Ukraine

Vymyslivka Вимислівка
- Location in Ternopil Oblast
- Coordinates: 49°31′20″N 25°10′57″E
- Country: Ukraine
- Oblast: Ternopil Oblast
- Raion: Ternopil Raion
- Hromada: Kozova settlement hromada
- Time zone: UTC+2 (EET)
  - Summer (DST): UTC+3 (EEST)
- Postal code: 47614

Vymyslivka (Ukrainian: Вимислівка) is a village in Kozova settlement hromada, Ternopil Raion, Ternopil Oblast, Ukraine.

== History ==
The first written mention of the village was in 1785.

After the liquidation of the Kozova Raion on 19 July 2020, the village became part of the Ternopil Raion.

== Religion ==
- St. Volodymyr church (1990; wooden).

== Sources ==
- "Wymysłówka". Geographical Dictionary of the Kingdom of Poland (in Polish). 14. Warszawa: Kasa im. Józefa Mianowskiego. 1895. p. 99.
