= Ladychyn =

Rural locality in Ternopil Oblast, Ukraine

Ladychyn Ладичин
- Location in Ternopil Oblast
- Coordinates: 49°22′40″N 25°34′13″E
- Country: Ukraine
- Oblast: Ternopil Oblast
- Raion: Ternopil Raion
- Hromada: Mykulyntsi settlement hromada
- Time zone: UTC+2 (EET)
  - Summer (DST): UTC+3 (EEST)
- Postal code: 48124

Ladychyn (Ukrainian: Ладичин; Polish: Ładyczyn) is a village in Mykulyntsi settlement hromada, Ternopil Raion, Ternopil Oblast, Ukraine.

== History ==
The first written mention of the village was in 1564.

After the liquidation of the Terebovlia Raion on 19 July 2020, the village became part of the Ternopil Raion.

== Religion ==
- Church of the Nativity of the Blessed Virgin Mary (1815, brick, UGCC),
- Church of the Sacred Heart of the Lord Jesus (1922, reconstructed, RCC).

== Notable residents ==
- Mykhailo Svitenkyi (1858–1936), Ukrainian priest and public figurę

== Sources ==
- (in Ukrainian) Клименко О., Уніят В., Ладичин // Ternopil Encyclopedic Dictionary: in 4 v. / editorial board: H. Yavorskyi and other, Ternopil: "Zbruch", 2005, V. 2: К—О, S. 312. — ISBN 966-528-199-2.
- "Ładyczyn". Geographical Dictionary of the Kingdom of Poland (in Polish). p. 252.
- "Ładyczyn". Geographical Dictionary of the Kingdom of Poland (in Polish). 5. Warszawa: Kasa im. Józefa Mianowskiego. 1884. p. 569.
