= Koniukhy =

Koniukhy Конюхи
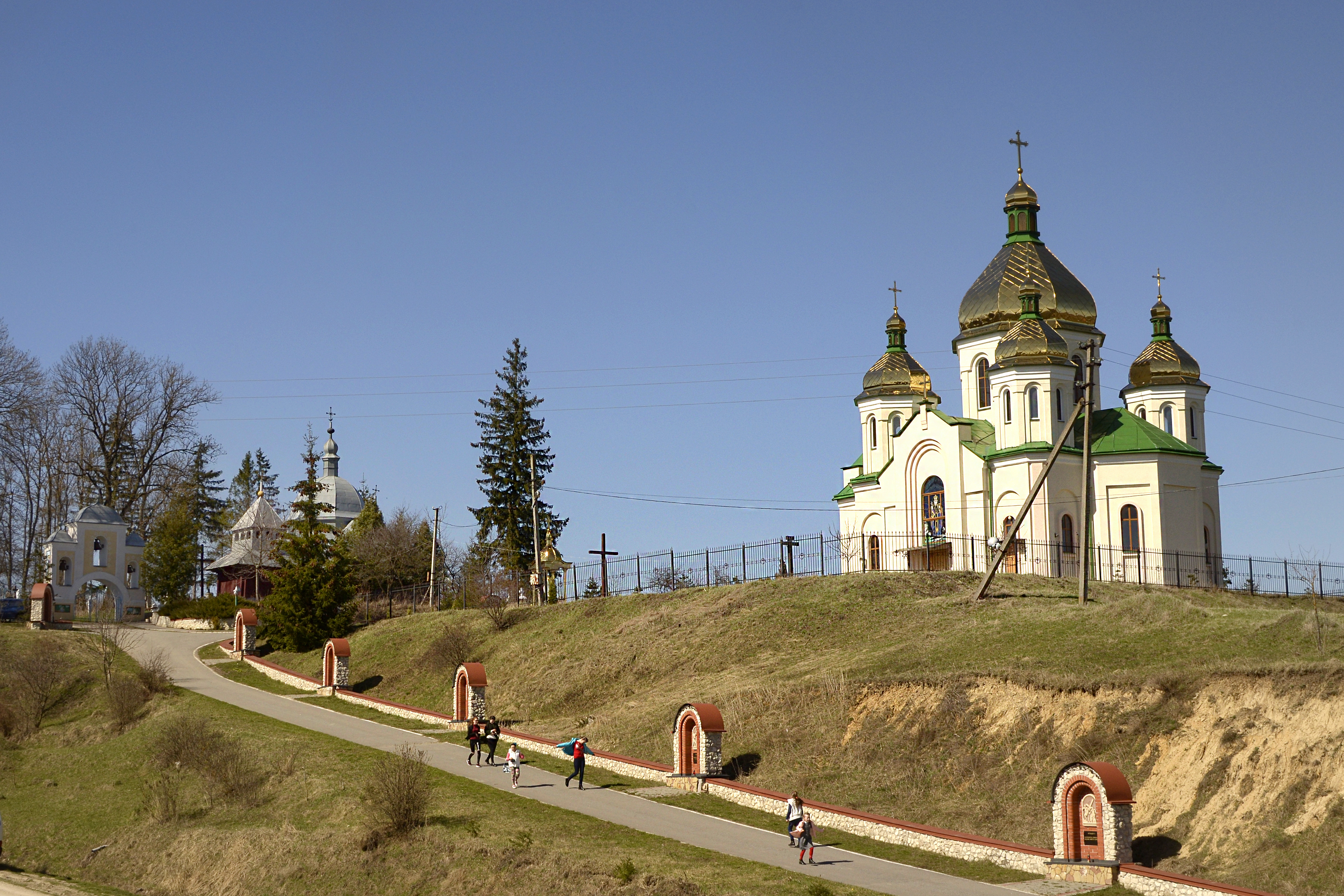
- Wooden Church of the Descent of the Holy Spirit (1700) and Church of St. John the Baptist (2010) in Koniukhy
- Interactive map of Koniukhy
- Coordinates: 49°33′40″N 25°03′29″E
- Country: Ukraine
- Oblast: Ternopil Oblast
- Raion: Ternopil Raion
- Hromada: Kozova settlement hromada
- First mentioned: 1440
- Postal code: 47612
- Area code: +380 3547

Koniukhy (Ukrainian Конюхи, Polish: Koniuchy) is a village in Ternopil Raion (Ternopil Oblast), Ukraine. It is located on the Korsa and the Koniukhy rivers. Koniukhy belongs to Kozova settlement hromada, one of the hromada administrative divisions of Ukraine.

== History ==
The origin of the village is associated with the ancient settlements of the Korsiv, which existed here before the Mongol-Tatar invasion. The current name is first mentioned in 1440 when the village was a small town. In 1626, as a result of the Tatars attack, the town was destroyed, and the village remained in its place. At the beginning of the 20th century "Prosvita", "Ridna shkola", "Silskyi hospodar" and other Ukrainian societies and organizations operated here.

Until 18 July 2020, Koniukhy belonged to Kozova Raion. The raion was abolished in July 2020 as part of the administrative reform of Ukraine, which reduced the number of raions of Ternopil Oblast to three. The area of Kozova Raion was merged into Ternopil Raion.

== Cultural heritage ==
In the village there are three churches, namely, the wooden Descent of the Holy Spirit (1607 or 1700), the Blessed Virgin Mary (1770), bell tower (1807), Church of the Nativity of St. John the Baptist (2010). The symbolic memorials of Sich Riflemen, OUN, Ukrainian Insurgent Army, memorable crosses in honor of the abolition of serfdom and the proclamation of Ukraine's Independence.
