= Koropets (river) =

River in Ternopil Oblast, Ukraine

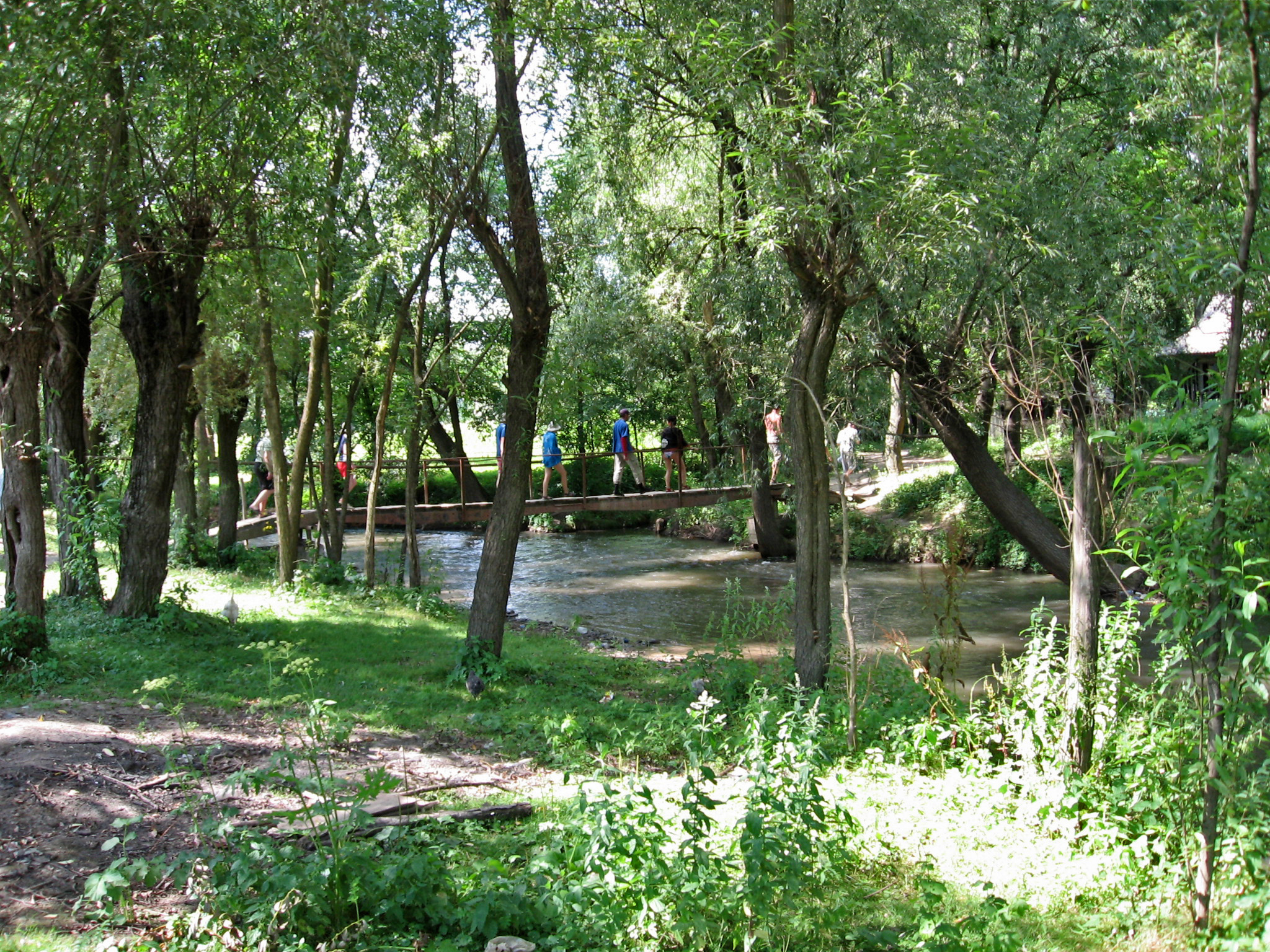
- Native name: Коропець (Ukrainian)

Location
- Country: Ukraine

Physical characteristics
- Source
  - location: north of Kozivka
  - elevation: 48°55′15″N 25°11′27″E
- Mouth: Dniester
  - coordinates: 49°27′32″N 25°05′52″E
- Length: 78 km (48 mi)

Koropets (Ukrainian: Коропець) is a river in Ukraine which flows within the Ternopil and Chortkiv Raions of Ternopil Oblast.

== Details ==
The left tributary of the Dniester River. Length – 78 km, catchment area – 511 km^{2}. Width – from 20 m, depth – 0,5-1,5 m.

It flows from a source near the village of Kozivka, and flows through the Podolian Upland, through Kozova, Pidhaitsi, Monastyryska, Koropets.

== Sources ==
- "Koropiec, także Koropczyk, rzeka". Geographical Dictionary of the Kingdom of Poland (in Polish). 4. Warszawa: Kasa im. Józefa Mianowskiego. 1883. p. 414.
