= Vybudiv =

Rural locality in Ternopil Oblast, Ukraine

Vybudiv Вибудів
- Location in Ternopil Oblast
- Coordinates: 49°31′34″N 25°6′7″E
- Country: Ukraine
- Oblast: Ternopil Oblast
- Raion: Ternopil Raion
- Hromada: Kozova settlement hromada
- Time zone: UTC+2 (EET)
  - Summer (DST): UTC+3 (EEST)
- Postal code: 47614

Vybudiv (Ukrainian: Вибудів) is a village in Kozova settlement hromada, Ternopil Raion, Ternopil Oblast, Ukraine.

== History ==
The first written mention of the village was in 1470.

After the liquidation of the Kozova Raion on 19 July 2020, the village became part of the Ternopil Raion.

== Religion ==
- Church of the Nativity (1751, wooden),
- Church of the Assumption of the Mother of God (1995, brick).

== Sources ==
- "Wybudów". Geographical Dictionary of the Kingdom of Poland (in Polish). 14. Warszawa: Kasa im. Józefa Mianowskiego. 1895. p. 72.
