= Kalne, Kozova settlement hromada, Ternopil Raion, Ternopil Oblast =

Rural locality in Ternopil Oblast, Ukraine

Kalne Кальне
- Location in Ternopil Oblast
- Coordinates: 49°22′22″N 25°8′46″E
- Country: Ukraine
- Oblast: Ternopil Oblast
- Raion: Ternopil Raion
- Hromada: Kozova settlement hromada
- Time zone: UTC+2 (EET)
  - Summer (DST): UTC+3 (EEST)
- Postal code: 47672

Kalne (Ukrainian: Кальне) is a village in Kozova settlement hromada, Ternopil Raion, Ternopil Oblast, Ukraine.

== History ==
The first written mention of the village was in 1473.

After the liquidation of the Kozova Raion on 19 July 2020, the village became part of the Ternopil Raion.

== Religion ==
- Two churches of St. Nicholas (wooden, 1720; brick, 2008).

== Sources ==
- (in Ukrainian) Бабій П., Уніят В., Кальне // Ternopil Encyclopedic Dictionary: in 4 v. / editorial board: H. Yavorskyi and other, Ternopil: "Zbruch", 2005, V. 2: К—О, S. 19–20. — ISBN 966-528-199-2.
- "Kalne 3.) K., wś, pow. brzeżański". Geographical Dictionary of the Kingdom of Poland (in Polish). 3. Warszawa: Kasa im. Józefa Mianowskiego. 1882. p. 703.
