= Helenky =

Rural locality in Ternopil Oblast, Ukraine

Helenky Геленки
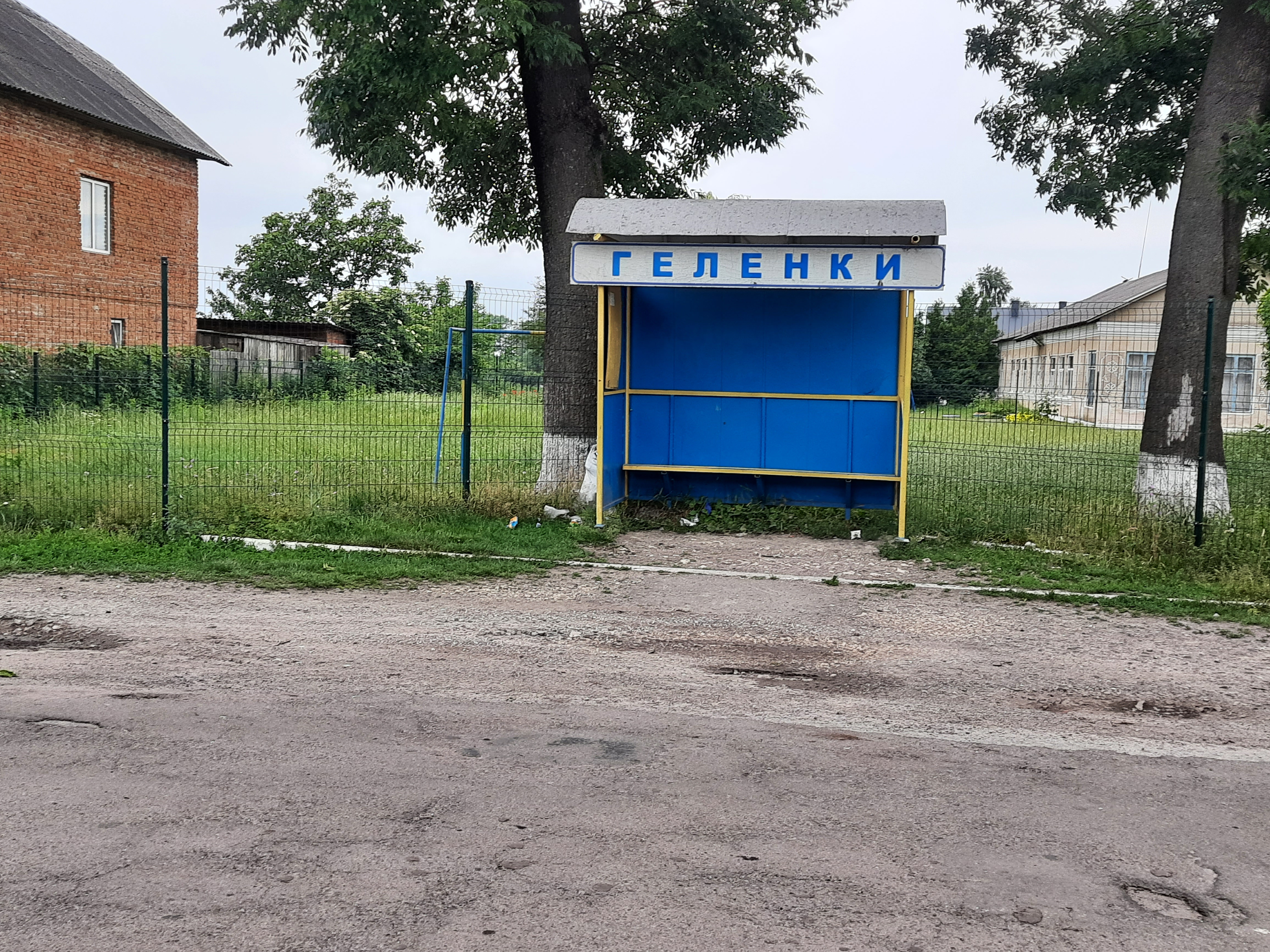

- Location in Ternopil Oblast
- Coordinates: 49°27′54″N 25°9′49″E
- Country: Ukraine
- Oblast: Ternopil Oblast
- Raion: Ternopil Raion
- Hromada: Kozova settlement hromada
- Time zone: UTC+2 (EET)
  - Summer (DST): UTC+3 (EEST)
- Postal code: 47682

Helenky (Ukrainian: Геленки) is a village in Kozova settlement hromada, Ternopil Raion, Ternopil Oblast, Ukraine.

== History ==
The first written mention of the village was in 1740.

After the liquidation of the Kozova Raion on 19 July 2020, the village became part of the Ternopil Raion.

== Religion ==
- Saint Demetrius church (construction began before the war but was completed in 1990, brick).

== Sources ==
- (in Ukrainian) Федечко В., Геленки // Ternopil Encyclopedic Dictionary: in 4 v. / editorial board: H. Yavorskyi and other, Ternopil: "Zbruch", 2004, V. 1: А—Й, S. 341. — ISBN 966-528-197-6.
- "Helenków". Geographical Dictionary of the Kingdom of Poland (in Polish). 3. Warszawa: Kasa im. Józefa Mianowskiego. 1882. p. 55.
