= Kozliv settlement hromada =

Hromada in Ternopil Oblast, Ukraine

Kozliv settlement hromada Козлівська селищна громада
- hromada
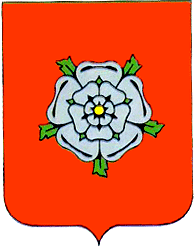
- Seal

- Location within Ternopil Oblast Location within Ukraine
- Coordinates: 49°33′40″N 25°19′41″E
- Country: Ukraine
- Oblast: Ternopil Oblast
- Raion: Ternopil Raion
- Administrative center: Kozliv

Government
  - Hromada head: Volodymyr Kolisnyk

Area
  - Total: 95.1 km^{2} (36.7 sq mi)

Population (2022)
  - Total: 4,351
- Urban-type settlement: 1
- Villages: 4
- Website: kozlivska-gromada.gov.ua

Kozliv settlement hromada (Ukrainian: Козлівська селищна територіальна громада, romanized: Kozlivska selyshchna terytorialna hromada is a hromada in Ukraine, in Ternopil Raion of Ternopil Oblast. The administrative center is the urban-type settlement of Kozliv. Its population is 4,351 (2022 estimate)

== Settlements ==
The community consists of 1 urban-type settlement (Kozliv) and 4 villages:

- Dmukhivtsi
- Pokropyvna
- Slobidka
- Tauriv
