= Krivoye, Vologodsky District =

Krivoye Кривое
- Village
- Location within Vologda Oblast Location within Russia
- Coordinates: 59°26′N 39°08′E
- Country: Russia
- Region: Vologda Oblast
- District: Vologodsky District
- Time zone: UTC+3:00

Krivoye (Russian: Кривое) is a rural locality (a village) in Kubenskoye Rural Settlement, Vologodsky District, Vologda Oblast, Russia. The population was 21 as of 2002.

== Geography ==
Krivoye is located 68 km northwest of Vologda (the district's administrative centre) by road. Dulovo is the nearest rural locality.
