= Kozova settlement hromada =

Hromada in Ternopil Oblast, Ukraine

Kozova settlement hromada Козівська селищна громада
- hromada
- Location within Ternopil Oblast Location within Ukraine
- Coordinates: 49°25′55″N 25°9′34″E
- Country: Ukraine
- Oblast: Ternopil Oblast
- Raion: Ternopil Raion
- Administrative center: Kozova

Government
  - Hromada head: Serhii Dobaliuk

Area
  - Total: 435.1 km^{2} (168.0 sq mi)

Population (2022)
  - Total: 24,732
- Urban-type settlement: 1
- Villages: 35
- Website: kozova-rada.gov.ua

Kozova settlement hromada (Ukrainian: Козівська селищна територіальна громада, romanized: Kozivska selyshchna terytorialna hromada is a hromada in Ukraine, in Ternopil Raion of Ternopil Oblast. The administrative center is the urban-type settlement of Kozova. Its population is 24,732 (2022 estimate)

== Settlements ==
The community consists of 1 urban-type settlement (Kozova) and 35 villages:

- Bartoshivka
- Byshky
- Budyliv
- Budova
- Vybudiv
- Vymyslivka
- Vivsia
- Viktorivka
- Helenky
- Hlynna
- Horby
- Horodyshche
- Dybshche
- Zaberizky
- Zalissia
- Zolota Sloboda
- Zolochivka
- Yosypivka
- Kalne
- Kozivka
- Koniukhy
- Kryve
- Makovysko
- Mala Plavucha
- Medova
- Mlyntsi
- Olesyne
- Ploske
- Plotycha
- Potik
- Senkiv
- Teofipilka
- Urytva
- Tseniv
- Shchepaniv
