= Kozliv =

Rural locality in Ternopil Oblast, Ukraine

Kozliv Козлів
- Rural settlement
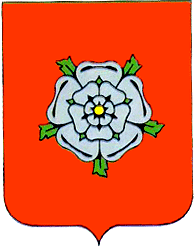
- Coat of arms

- Location of Kozliv in Ternopil Oblast Location of Kozliv in Ukraine
- Coordinates: 49°33′40″N 25°19′41″E
- Country: Ukraine
- Oblast: Ternopil Oblast
- Raion: Ternopil Raion
- Founded: 1467
- Rural settlement: 2024

Government
  - Town Head: Volodymyr Kolisnyk

Area
  - Total: 7 km^{2} (2.7 sq mi)
- Elevation: 348 m (1,142 ft)

Population (2022)
  - Total: 1,758
  - Density: 250/km^{2} (650/sq mi)
- Time zone: UTC+2 (EET)
  - Summer (DST): UTC+3 (EEST)
- Postal code: 47600—47684
- Area code: +380 3547
- Website: http://rada.gov.ua/

Kozliv (Ukrainian: Козлів; Polish: Kozłów; Yiddish: קאָזלעוו, romanized: Kozlev) is a rural settlement in Ternopil Raion, Ternopil Oblast, western Ukraine. It hosts the administration of Kozliv settlement hromada, one of the hromadas of Ukraine. Population: 1,758 (2022 estimate).

== Name ==
The name Kozliv stems from the Ukrainian noun kozel, meaning goat.

== History ==
Kozliv was first mentioned in 1467. Located in the western part of the historical region of Podolia, it initially had the status of a town.

During World War II Kozliv was under German occupation from 1941 to 1944. In 1952, it was a village, there was а distillery, a primary school, a secondary school, a machine tractor station and a Palace of Culture.

Kozliv acquired the status of an urban-type settlement in 1961. Under the Soviet rule it was a district centre of Ternopil Oblast.

In January 1989 the population was 2,041 people.

In January 2013 the population was 1,846 people.

Until 18 July 2020, Kozliv belonged to Kozova Raion. The raion was abolished in July 2020 as part of the administrative reform of Ukraine, which reduced the number of raions of Ternopil Oblast to three. The area of Kozova Raion was merged into Ternopil Raion. On 26 January 2024, a new law entered into force which abolished the urban-type settlement status, and Kozliv became a rural settlement.

== Transport ==
A railway station is 14 km from Kozliv
