= Kozivka, Kozova settlement hromada, Ternopil Raion, Ternopil Oblast =

Rural locality in Ternopil Oblast, Ukraine

Kozivka Козівка
- Location in Ternopil Oblast
- Coordinates: 49°27′25″N 25°6′30″E
- Country: Ukraine
- Oblast: Ternopil Oblast
- Raion: Ternopil Raion
- Hromada: Kozova settlement hromada
- Time zone: UTC+2 (EET)
  - Summer (DST): UTC+3 (EEST)
- Postal code: 47642

Kozivka (Ukrainian: Козівка) is a village in Kozova settlement hromada, Ternopil Raion, Ternopil Oblast, Ukraine.

== History ==
The first written mention of the village was in the late 16th and early 17th centuries.

After the liquidation of the Kozova Raion on 19 July 2020, the village became part of the Ternopil Raion.

== Religion ==
- Church of the Nativity (1773, wooden),
- Church of the Transfiguration (2007).

== Sources ==
- (in Ukrainian) Бучинський О., Уніят В., Козівка // Ternopil Encyclopedic Dictionary: in 4 v. / editorial board: H. Yavorskyi and other, Ternopil: "Zbruch", 2005, V. 2: К—О, S. 127. — ISBN 966-528-199-2.
- "Kozówka 1.) wś, pow. brzeżański". Geographical Dictionary of the Kingdom of Poland (in Polish). 4. Warszawa: Kasa im. Józefa Mianowskiego. 1883. p. 573.
