= Kryve =

Kryve (Ukrainian: Криве) is a name of several populated places in Ukraine:

- Kryve, Chervohohrad Raion, Lviv Oblast
- Kryve, Kozova settlement hromada, Ternopil Raion, Ternopil Oblast
- Kryve, Lviv Raion, Lviv Oblast
- Kryve, Skalat urban hromada, Ternopil Raion, Ternopil Oblast
- Kryve, Stryi Raion, Lviv Oblast
- Kryve, Zhytomyr Oblast

== See also ==
- Kryve Ozero, an urban-type settlement in Mykolaiv Oblast, Ukraine
- Krivoye (disambiguation)
