= Krivoye Lake =

Lake in Russia

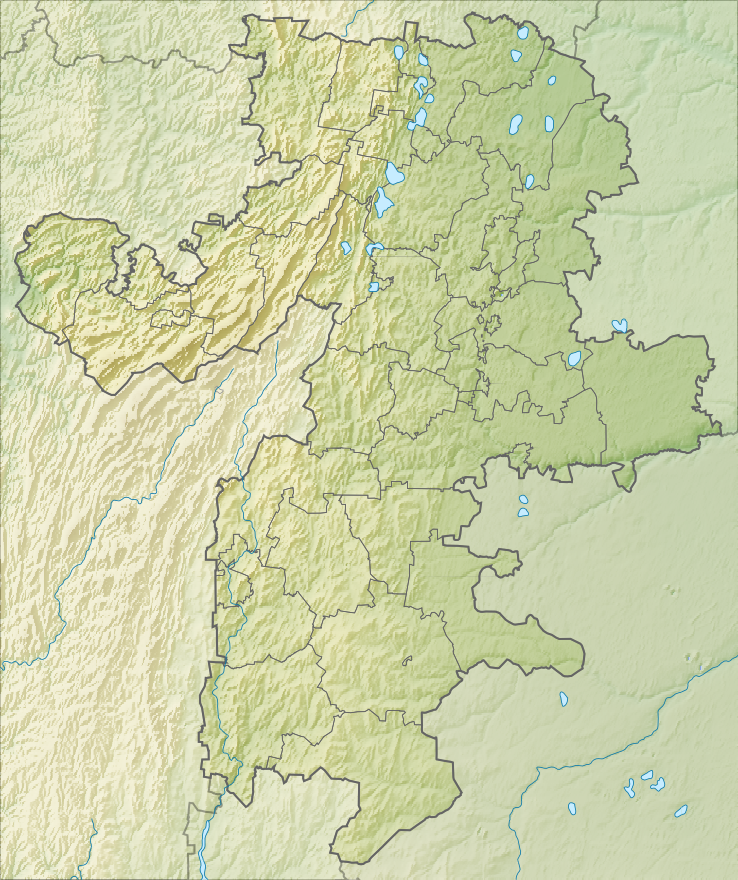
- Location within Chelyabinsk Oblast
- Location: Chelyabinsk Oblast
- Coordinates: 53°15′33″N 59°13′41″E
- Basin countries: Russia

Krivoye (Russian: Кривое), sometimes Krivoye Ozero, is a small oxbow lake in the Chelyabinsk Oblast of Russia, southeast of Magnitogorsk, near the Kazakhstani border. Its name is translated from the Russian as "Crooked Lake", reflecting its type.

The lake is primarily known for the Sintashta-Petrovka burials, dotted over the area of some 10 km^{2}. Particularly notable is one of the earliest chariot burials in the world, dated to ca. 2000 BC.The chariot grave contained a horse skull, three pots, two bridle cheek pieces, and points of spears and arrows. The bones were dated to an average of 2026 BC.
