= Kozova Raion =

Former subdivision of Ternopil Oblast, Ukraine

Kozova Raion Козівський район
- Raion
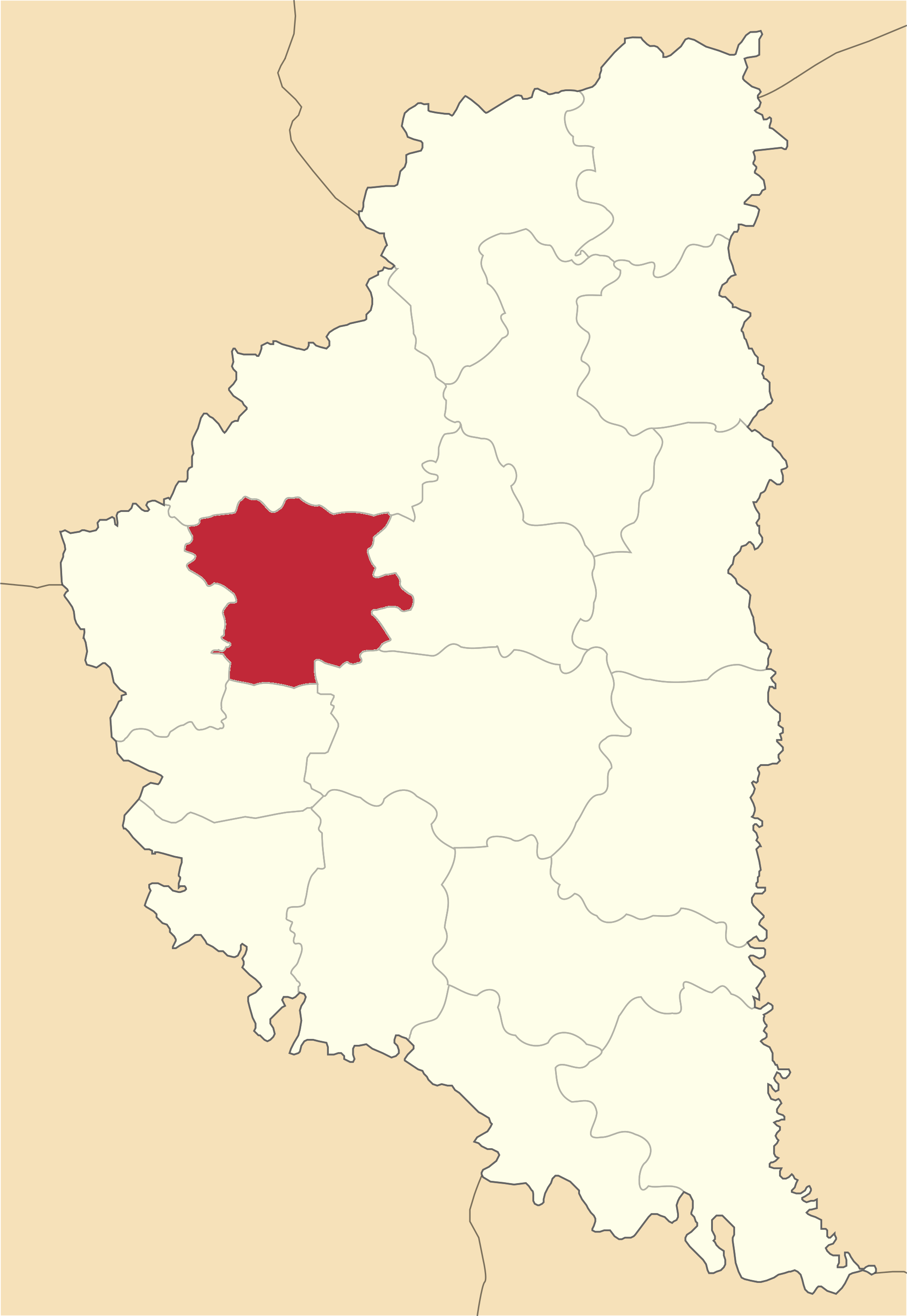
- Coordinates: 49°30′N 25°14′E
- Country: Ukraine
- Oblast: Ternopil Oblast
- Established: 1939
- Disestablished: 18 July 2020
- Admin. center: Kozova
- Subdivisions: List: — city councils; — settlement councils; — rural councils; Number of localities: — cities; — urban-type settlements; 53 — villages; — rural settlements

Area
  - Total: 694 km^{2} (268 sq mi)

Population (2020)
  - Total: 36,394
  - Density: 52.4/km^{2} (136/sq mi)
- Time zone: UTC+02:00 (EET)
  - Summer (DST): UTC+03:00 (EEST)
- Area code: 380-3547

Kozova Raion (Ukrainian: Козівський район) was a raion (district) of Ternopil Oblast in western Ukraine. The administrative center was the town of Kozova. Its area was 694 square kilometres (268 sq mi). The raion was abolished on 18 July 2020 as part of the administrative reform of Ukraine, which reduced the number of raions of Ternopil Oblast to three. The area of Kozova Raion was merged into Ternopil Raion. The last estimate of the raion population was 36,394 (2020 est.).

== Population ==
Population of Kozova in 1900 was 2,031 and in 1939 it was 2,570. In 2020, it was 8937.

== Subdivisions ==
At the time of disestablishment, the raion consisted of three hromadas:

- Kozliv settlement hromada with the administration in the urban-type settlement of Kozliv;
- Kozova settlement hromada with the administration in Kozova;
- Kupchyntsi rural hromada with the administration in the selo of Kupchyntsi.

== Villages ==
Other villages in Kozova Raion included: On the basis of new topographical map of Ternopil region published in Ukrainian in 1990 s Names are given in Ukrainian (Polish / Russian):

- Avhustivka, Awhustiwka, Avgustivka ( Augustowka / Awgustowka / Avgustovka) - 24 km north of Kozova (from first name Avhust = August)
- Beneva, Benewa (Beniawa / Byeneva, Byenyeva) - 16 km south east of Kozova
- Bohatkivtsi, Bogatkivtsi, Bohatkiwci, Bohatkiwci (Bogatkowcy / Bogatkovtsy) - 17 km east of Kozova (from "bahaty" - rich, "bahato" / "bahatsko" - much)
- Budyliv, Budyliw (Budilow / Budilov) - 15 km north east of Kozova (from "budyty" - awake)
- Byshky (Byszky / Byshki) - 15 km north west of Kozova (from "byty" - to beat)
- Denysiv, Denysiw, Denisiv, Denisiw (Denisow / Denisov) - 19 km east of Kozova (from first name Denys = Dennis)
- Drahomanivka, Dragomanivka (Darhomanowka, Dragomanowka / Dragomanovka) - 20 km east of Kozova (from old Ukrainian "drahoman / dragoman" - translator, learned person)
- Dybshche (Dybszcze, Dubszcze / Dybshche) - 2 km west of Kozova (from "dub" - oak)
- Ishkiv, Iszkiw, Ishkiw (Iszkow / Ishkov) - 17 km east of Kozova (from name Ishko)
- Helenky, Gelenky (Helenky, Helenki / Gelenki, former Polish name - Helenków) - 3 km north of Kozova (from name Helena, the village must have belonged to some Polish landlord called Helena)
- Horodyshche, Gorodyshche (Horodiszcze, Horodisko / Gorodishche) - 18 km north east of Kozova (from "horod" - fortified town, fortress, city, garden)
- Kalne (Kalne / Kalnoye) - 5 km south of Kozova
- Kozivka (Kozowka / Kozovka) - 2 km north west of Kozova (from "koza'" - goat)
- Konyukhy (Koniuchy / Konyukhi) - 17 km north of Kozova (from "kin'" - horse)
- Kozliv, Kozliw (Kozlow / Kozlov) - town 20 km north east of Kozova (from "kozel" - goat)
- Kryve, Krive (Krzywe / Krivoye) - 3 km south west of Kozova (from "kryvy" - wry)
- Kupchyntsi, Kupczynci (Kupczynce / Kupchintsy) - 17 km east of Kozova (from "kupets" - trader)
- Malovody (Malowody / Malovody) - 15 km south east of Kozova (from "mali vody" - little waters)
- Olesyne (Olesyne / Olesinoye) - 5 km north of Kozova (from Oles' / Alexandre - first name)
- Pidruda (Podrudzie / Podruda) - 13 km south east of Kozova (from "pid" under and "ruda" iron)
- Plotycha, Plotyche (Plotycza, Plotycze / Ploticha, Plotiche) - 16 km east of Kozova (from "plit" / "plot" - fence, "plotyty" to fence or install a damb)
- Rosukhuvatets, Rosochuwatec (Rosuchuwaciec / Rosukhuvatyets) - 10 km south east of Kozova (from "sukhy" - dry / "rozsushyty" - to dry)
- Semykivtsi, Semykiwci (Siemikowce / Semikovtsy) - 18 km south east of Kozova (from Ukrainian first slang name Semyk deriving from correct Semen = Simon)
- Shchepaniv, Szczepaniw (Szczepanow / Shchepanov) - 7 km south of Kozova (from "shchepyty" - to plant or from first name Stepan = Stephan)
- Sosniv (Sosnow / Sosnov) - 18 km south east of Kozova (from "sosna" - pine tree)
- Tseniv, Ceniw, Ceniv (Ceniów, Cenow / Tsenov) - 14 km north of Kozova (from "tsinyty" - to appreciate, "tsina" - price)
- Teofipilka (Teofipolka, Teofipowka / Teofipolka) - 4 km east of Kozova (from name Theofipil)
- Tsytsory (Cycory, Cecory / Tsytsory) - 23 km north east of Kozova (from "tytsy" - fem. breast)
- Yastrubove, Jastrobove (Jastrzebie, Jastrzembie / Yastrubovoye) - 17 km east of Kozova (from Slavic bird term "yastrub" - hawk)
- Yosypivka, Josypiwka, Josypivka (Jozefowka / Iosipovka, Yosipovka, Iosiofovka, Yosifovka) - 2 km south of Kozova (from first name Yosyp = Joseph)
- Vybudiv (Wybudow / Vybudov) - 10 km north of Kozova (from "budyty" - to awake)
- Vymyslivka (Wymislowka) - 15 km north of Kozova (from "vymyslyty" - to invent)
