= Mykhailo Nykolaichuk =

Ukrainian painter and graphic artist (born 1946)

- Михайло Степанович Николайчук
- Born: 14 November 1946 (age 79); Lysivtsi, Ternopil Oblast, Ukraine
- Education: Kosiv School of Applied Arts, Lviv Institute of Applied and Decorative Arts
- Occupations: Painter and graphic artist

Mykhailo Stepanovych Nykolaichuk (Ukrainian: Михайло Степанович Николайчук; born 14 November 1946) is a Ukrainian painter and graphic artist. Member of the National Union of Artists of Ukraine from 1988. He is the father of footballer Matvii Nykolaichuk.

== Biography ==
Mykhailo Nykolaichuk was born on 14 November 1946, in Lysivtsi (now Tovste Hromada, Chortkiv Raion, Ternopil Oblast, Ukraine).

He graduated from the Kosiv School of Applied Arts, and in 1975, from the Lviv Institute of Applied and Decorative Arts (his specialized teachers were V. Vendzylovych and R. Selskyi). From 1977 to 1990, he worked at the Ternopil Art and Production Plant.

In 1989, along with others, he founded the art group "Khoruhva".

== Creativity ==
He worked in major fields, particularly easel and monumental painting, and graphics.

From 1978, he has been presenting his works at city, all-Ukrainian, and international exhibitions. Solo exhibitions have been held in Chernivtsi (1986), Ivano-Frankivsk (1987), Lviv (1988), and Ternopil (1990, 1996, 2000, 2006, 2018).

A folk character bursts forth in Mykola Nykolaichuk's temperamental painting. He combines aesthetically chosen colors with dynamic lines and expressive decorative elements in his planar compositions. He was the head of the fresco painting for churches in the villages of Kupchyntsi, Velyki Hai, and Petrykiv in the Ternopil Raion. Some of his works are preserved in the collections of the National Art Museum of Ukraine in Kyiv; the Ternopil and Khmelnytskyi art museums; and in private collections in Australia, Canada, Germany, Poland, the U.S., and France.

Among his important works:

- Easel paintings: "Zalizni stovpy" (1975), "Mariia" (1980), "Novyi den" (1986), the triptych "Kateryna", "Kolyskova" (all — 1988), "Radiatsiia", "Tysk", "Vsevydiache oko", "Mariia" (all — 1992), "Serafymy" (1994), "Promenysta" (1995), "Seliany" (1996), "Zhinky" (1998), "Idemo", "Rover 'Khoruhvy'" (both — 2000).
- Series: "Or i Lel'" (2006).
- Monumental murals: Ternopil Regional Children's Clinical Hospital (1985–1987), the House of Nature in Ternopil, the Church of St. Nicholas in of Denysiv in the Ternopil Raion (both — 1992).
- Watercolors: "Opika" (1995), "Stykhiia", "Zvistka" (both — 1996), "Vesna" (1997).

== Awards ==
- Mykhailo Boichuk Prize (1990).

== Bibliography ==
- Nykolaichuk Mykhailo Stepanovych / I. M. Duda, Yu. I. Dolynna // Encyclopedia of Modern Ukraine [Online] / Eds. : I. М. Dziuba, A. I. Zhukovsky, M. H. Zhelezniak [et al.] ; National Academy of Sciences of Ukraine, Shevchenko Scientific Society. – Kyiv : The NASU institute of Encyclopedic Research, 2021.
- (in Ukrainian) Дуда І., Удіна Т., Николайчук Михайло Степанович // Ternopil Encyclopedic Dictionary: in 4 v. / editorial board: H. Yavorskyi and other, Ternopil: "Zbruch", 2005, V. 2: К—О, S. 629. — ISBN 966-528-199-2.
- Николайчук Михайло Степанович // Мистці Тернопільщини. Частина 1. Образотворче мистецтво: бібліографічний покажчик / департамент культури, релігій та національностей Тернопільської облдержадміністарації, Тернопільська обласна університецька наукова бібліотека; укладач Миськів В.; вступна стаття І. Дуда; керівник проєкту та науковий редактор Вітенко В.; редактор Жовтко Г. — Тернопіль : Підручники і посібники, 2015. — С. 188—190. — ISBN 978-966-07-2936-0.
- Дуда І. Михайло Николайчук // Тернопіль. — 1994. — № 2/3 : Художники Тернопільщини. — С. 69 : портр., іл.
- Хома В. Літературно-мистецька Козівщина. — Т. : Воля, 2003. — С. 183—184. : фотогр.
- Хома В. Старовинні Купчинці. — Т. : Горлиця, 2000. — С. 98.
- Онищук Д. Сповідник волі і любові // Колос. — 2011. — 11 листоп. — С. 4.
- Павуляк Я. Невгамовна муза // Русалка Дністрова. — 1996. — Чис. 21 (листоп.).
- Ситник І. Естетичне одкровення Михайла Николайчука // Тернопільський оглядач. — 2008. — 1 серп. — С. 18—19.
- Собуцька В. У вихорі кольору і почуттів // Свобода. — 2006. — 2 груд. — С. 6. — (Виставка).
- Сорока П. Естетичне одкровення Михайла Николайчука, або Синтез українського духу // Дзвін. — 2007. — № 1. — С. 151—153.
- Удіна Т. Від реальності — до образності // Літературний Тернопіль. — 2011. — № 4. — С. 114—118, [2] арк. іл. — (Художник номера).
- Удіна Т. Той, що хмари розганяє // Вільне життя. — 2006. — 16 груд. — С. 8. — (Світ нашої духовності).

=== Other publications ===
Catalogs:

- Михайло Николайчук [Образотворчий матеріал] = Mykhaylo Nykolaychuk : [каталог] / авт. вступ. ст. П. Сорока ; худож. ред.-упоряд., авт. передм. та післямови Т. Удіна. — Т. : Колір Прінт, 2010. — 56 с. : іл. кольор., фотогр. — Текст парал. укр., англ.
- Михайло Николайчук [Образотворчий матеріал] : [буклет] / передм. Т. Удіної. — Т. : [б. в.], [2006?]. — [6] с. : іл. кольор.
- Живопис. Скульптура : каталог музейної збірки. Ч. 1 / Терноп. обл. худож. музей ; упоряд. О. М. Войтович [та ін.] ; авт. вступ. ст. І. Дуда ; за ред. І. М. Дуди. — Т. : Астон, 2007. — С. 79—80, [64] с. іл. кольор.
- Мистці Тернополя : каталог виставки у Братиславі, 5—19 груд. 1995 р. / Терноп. орг. Спілки художників України ; авт.-упоряд. І. Дуда. — Т. : Лілея, 1995. — С. 16—17. : фотогр., іл.
- Николайчук Михайло Степанович : [біогр. довідка] // Тернопільська обласна організація Національної спілки художників України : [альбом- каталог]. — Т., [2007?]. — С. 36 : фотогр.
- Николайчук Михайло Степанович : [біогр. довідка] // Тернопільській обласній організації Національної спілки художників України 20: [альбом-каталог]. — Т., [2003?]. — С. 60 : фотогр.
