= Ivan Muliarchuk =

Ukrainian sculptor (1930–2020)

- Іван Мартвійович Мулярчук
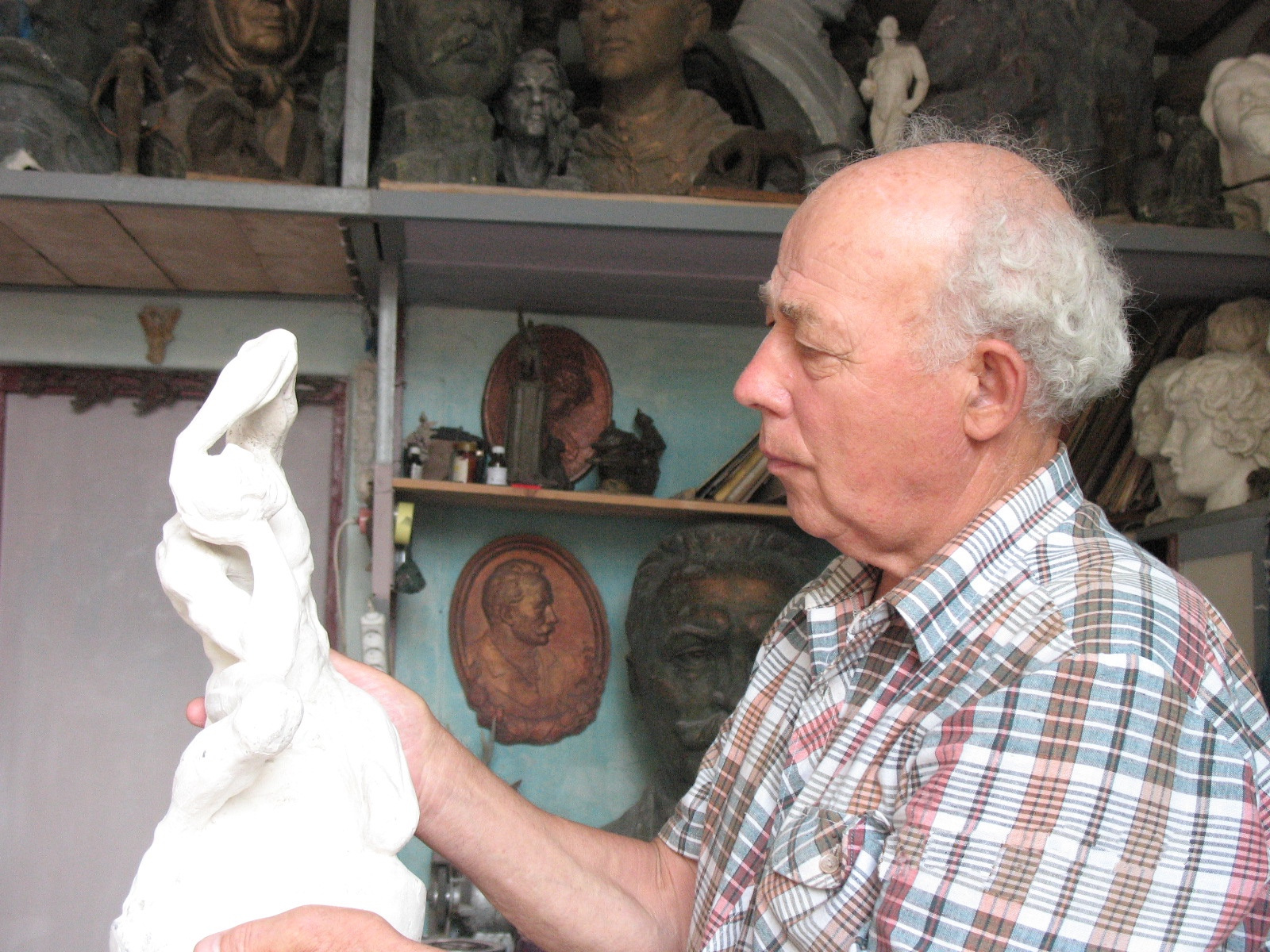
- Born: 27 July 1930; Ostrozhets, Poland (now Ukraine)
- Died: 18 May 2020 (aged 89); Ternopil, Ukraine
- Education: Krasnodar Pedagogical Institute

Ivan Muliarchuk (Ukrainian: Мулярчук Іван Матвійович; 27 July 1930 in Ostrozhets – 18 May 2020 in Ternopil) was a Ukrainian sculptor and member of the National Union of Artists of Ukraine (1988).

== Biography ==
His talent for drawing manifested itself in childhood.

A graduate of the Lutsk Art School (1952) and the Faculty of Art and Graphics of the Krasnodar Pedagogical Institute (1967). He worked as a teacher of drawing and sketching at the Ternopil Art Combine of the National Union of Artists of Ukraine.

From 1970 in Ternopil. Father of Dmytro Muliarchuk.

== Works ==
Muliarchuk worked in the field of easel and monumental sculpture, for which he used marble, granite, sandstone, bronze and artificial stone.

The author of about 50 monuments and more than 180 easel sculptures, monuments, among others:

- soldiers-fishermen (1969, Temryuk, Russia),
- Hero of the Soviet Union O. Zhadov (1985, Ternopil),
- Taras Shevchenko (1989, Verbovets, Kremenets Raion; 1993, Yabluniv; 1999, Tovste; both – Chortkiv Raion),
- Ivanna Blazhkevych (1989, Denysiv, Ternopil Raion),
- Stepan Charnetskyi (1991, Shmankivtsi, Chortkiv Raion),
- Ivan Franko (1992, Tsyhany, Chortkiv Raion),
- Denys Lukiianovych (Horodnytsia, Chortkiv Raion),
- Vasyl Simovych (both in 1993; Hadynkivtsi; both in the Chortkiv Raion),
- Pavlo Dumka (1999, Kupchyntsi, Ternopil Raion),
- to the 2000th anniversary of the Nativity of Christ (2000, Bila, Ternopil Raion)
- Independence (2003, Monastyryska; 2006, Romanivka, Ternopil Raion),
- soldiers of the UPA "Pokrova" (2005, Sapova, Ternopil Raion),
- To the Fighters for the Freedom of Ukraine (2006, Vasylkivtsi), Bishop Hryhorii Khomyshyn (2008, Hadynkivtsi; both – Chortkiv Raion),
- "Vitta – bohunnia zhyttia" (2009, Anapa, Krasnodar Territory);

series of portraits:

- "Trnopoliany" (1970–1990);

busts:

- A. Yelchaninov (1980),
- Hero of Socialist Labor A. Karpenko (1987),
- Taras Shevchenko (1989, Horodyshche, Ternopil Raion; all – Ternopil Oblast);

compositions:

- "Pratseiu zvelycheni" (1988);

memorial plaques:

- Severyn Dnistryanskyi (1991),
- Vasyl Stefanyk, Osyp Vitoshynskyi (both – 1992; all – Ternopil);

emblem:

- "Nauka" (Chortkiv Institute of Entrepreneurship and Business, Ternopil Oblast, 2004).
