= Volodymyr Khoma =

Ukrainian local historian, folklorist, writer (1930–2005)

- Володимир Іванович Хома
- Born: Volodymyr Ivanovych Khoma; 2 February 1930; Denysiv, Poland (now Ukraine)
- Died: 6 March 2005 (aged 75); Kupchyntsi, Ukraine
- Education: Kremenets Teachers' Institute, Kyiv Pedagogical Institute of Foreign Languages

Volodymyr Khoma (Ukrainian: Володимир Іванович Хома; 2 February 1930 – 6 March 2005) was a Ukrainian educator, local historian, literary critic, folklorist, writer. Corresponding member of the Rylsky Institute of Art Studies, Folklore and Ethnology, member of the National Union of Journalists of Ukraine (1992), the All-Ukrainian Union of Local History (1992), the Geographical Union of the Ukrainian SSR (1969); honorary member of the All-Ukrainian Union "Prosvita" (1998).

== Biography ==
Volodymyr Khoma was born on 2 February 1930 in Denysiv, now the Kupchyntsi rural hromada of the Ternopil Raion, Ternopil Oblast, Ukraine.

Khoma graduated from the Faculty of Philology of the Kremenets Teachers' Institute (1950, now Ternopil Volodymyr Hnatiuk National Pedagogical University), the Faculty of Philology of Lviv University (1957), and the Kyiv Pedagogical Institute of Foreign Languages (1962).

Khoma worked as a teacher of secondary schools in the villages of Pokropyvna (1949–1950), Tseniv (1953–1956), Kalne (1956–1960), Kupchyntsi (1960–1990); senior researcher at the local history museum in Denysiv (1990–2004, all in Ternopil Raion).

Khoma initiated the construction of monuments to Pavlo Dumka and Ivan Franko in Kupchyntsi, Ternopil Raion.

== Works ==
His research interests include the works of Taras Shevchenko, Ivan Franko, Ivanna Blazhkevych, Ivan Verkhratskyi, Volodymyr Hnatiuk, Pavlo Dumka, Olha Duchyminska, Meletii Kichura, Juliusz Słowacki, and others.

The author of more than 2000 articles, including local history works about the villages of Drahomanivka, Kupchyntsi, Yastrubove in Ternopil Raion; reviews of scientific, artistic, and local history works; articles in the Shevchenko Dictionary (1976–1977), Encyclopedia of Ukrainian Literature, Ukrainian Soviet Encyclopedia, Ukrainian Soviet Encyclopedic Dictionary, Ternopil Encyclopedic Dictionary; in the national, oblast, and raion press.

Books:

- Ivan Franko v Kupchyntsiakh i Drahomanivtsi (1996),
- Nash cynio-zhovtyi stiah,
- Denysiv – selo pradavnie,
- Providnyk “Yefrem” (all from 1997),
- Denysivskyi kalendar,
- Pavlo Dumka. Literaturnyi portret (both 1999),
- Starovynni Kupchyntsi (2000),
- Denysivski Ukrainski Sichovi Striltsi
- Literaturno-mystetska Kozivshchyna,
- Shchedrist pratsi (all from 2003).

Collections for children:

- My malenki ditochky (1993),
- U sadochku (1997),
- Lisova Bilisnizhka (1999).

Bibliographic indexes:

- Khliborob (1971, co-author),
- Ivanna Blazhkevych (1980).

Book compiler:

- Pavlo Dumka's "Vesnianka" (1970) and "Molytva rilnyka" (1994),
- Ivanna Blazhkevych's "Pryletiv leleka" (1971), "Chy ie v sviti shcho svitlishe?" (1977), "U dytiachomy sadochku" (1993), "Dramatychni tvory dlia ditei" (1993), "Pisni z-nad Strypy u zapysakh Ivanny Blazhkevych" (with composer Vasyl Podufalyi, 1993),
- Yevhen Borodiievych's "V chotyrykutnyku smerti" (1993).

Has collected a lot of folklore and ethnographic materials from the Ternopil region, which were published in the collections "Rekrutski ta soldatski pisni" (1974), "Spilkuvannia mytsiv z narodnoiu poeziieiu" (1981), "Pisni kokhznnia" (1986), "Balady" (3 vols., 1987), "Pisni Ternopilshchyny" (1993), "Kazky Zakhidnoho Podillia" (1994) and others.

== Awards ==
- Ivanna Blazhkevych Prize (1993),
- Honorary local historian of Ukraine.

== Sources ==
- Ярема, К. Володимир Хома: Літ. портрет: До 70-річчя від дня народження, Тернопіль, 2000, 36 s.
- Головин, Б. Літературознавець та фольклорист // Вільне життя, 04.02.1995.
- Сім'я, Г. Перлина до перлини // Вільне життя, 30.01.1990.
- Головин, Б. Натура творча, дослідницька // Вільне життя, 01.02.2000, (Ювілеї).
- Савак, Б. Не міліє джерело його творчості // Свобода, 19.02.2000, (Ювілеї).
- Штокало-Пархомчук, Я. Наступник Павла Думки та Іванни Блажкевич // Вільне життя плюс, 11.02.2015, No. 11, s. 11, (Пам'ять).
- Штокало-Пархомчук, Я. Купчинецький каменяр // Вільне слово, 12.02.2015, No. 7, s. 5, (Видатні особистості району).
- Савак, Б. Ювілейні роковини краєзнавця // Свобода, 13.02.2015, No. 11, s. 4, (Добрим словом).
- Савак, Б. Відзначено ювілейні роковини краєзнавця // Вільне слово, 13.02.2015, No. 7, s. 5, (Видатні особистості району).
