= Bohdan Pastukh =

Ukrainian literary critic, artist (1924–2008)

- Богдан Васильович Пастух
- Born: Bohdan Vasyliovych Pastukh; 17 September 1924; Kupchyntsi, Poland (now Ukraine)
- Died: 26 November 2008 (aged 84); Vrubivskyi, Ukraine
- Education: Kremenets Teachers' Institute, Voroshylovhrad Pedagogical Institute

Bohdan Pastukh (Ukrainian: Богдан Васильович Пастух; 17 September 1924 – 26 November 2008) was a Ukrainian literary critic, artist, teacher, public figure. Participant of the World War II. Grandfather of Taras Pastukh.

== Biography ==
Bohdan Pastukh was born on 17 September 1924 in Kupchyntsi, now the Kupchyntsi rural hromada of the Ternopil Raion, Ternopil Oblast, Ukraine.

He graduated from the Faculty of History and Philology of the Kremenets Teachers' Institute (now Ternopil Volodymyr Hnatiuk National Pedagogical University) and the Faculty of Philology of the Voroshylovhrad Pedagogical Institute (1952, now University of Luhansk). For 40 years, he worked as a teacher of Ukrainian language and literature at a secondary school in Vrubivskyi.

== Public activities ==
In 1993–2008, he was the first and honorary chairman of the Prosvita Luhansk Regional Association; chairman of the Ivan Ohienko Luhansk Regional Society.

In 1998, he initiated the establishment of the People's Memorial and Literary Museum and the construction of a monument to Borys Hrinchenko in Oleksiivka, Perevalsk Raion (now part of Mykhailivka, Alchevsk Raion). He also initiated the creation of the Pavlo Dumka Museum in his native village.

== Works ==
Author of publications related to language, culture, and literary studies. He created more than 100 bookplates of Taras Shevchenko, Panteleimon Kulish, Ivan Franko, Bohdan Lepkyi, Volodymyr Sosiura; ex libris for the libraries of Ivanna Blazhkevych, Borys Demkiv, and Maksym Rylskyi.

Books:

- "Poet nizhnosti, tryvohy i boliu: [pro Volodymyra Sosiuru]" (1998),
- "Borys Hrinchenko – bezkompromisnyi lytsar natsionalnoi idei" (1999),
- "Trokhym Zinkivskyi – syn Ukrainy – “kreshtal kryvavoi sliozy”" (2001).

== Awards ==
- Borys Hrinchenko Prize (2003);
- Prize of the All-Ukrainian Cultural and Scientific Foundation of Taras Shevchenko "V svoii khati svoia pravda, i syla, i volia" (2008).

== Sources ==
- Алла Антіпова (2009-08-08). "Таємна шафа Богдана Пастуха". Голос України.
