= Stepan Ivakhiv =

Ukrainian businessman and politician

- Степан Івахів
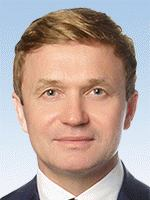
- Official portrait, 2019

People's Deputy of Ukraine
- Incumbent
- Assumed office 12 December 2012
- Preceded by: Constituency established
- Constituency: Volyn Oblast, No. 21

Personal details
- Born: 24 January 1968 (age 58) Andriyivka, Ukrainian SSR, Soviet Union (now Ukraine)
- Party: For the Future
- Other political affiliations: Independent

Stepan Petrovych Ivakhiv (Ukrainian: Степан Петрович Івахів; born 24 January 1968) is a Ukrainian businessman and politician currently serving as a People's Deputy of Ukraine representing Ukraine's 21st electoral district as a member of For the Future since 2019, having previously represented the district as an independent since 2012. He is co-owner of the Continuum FIG and the WOG gas station network, and is among the 100 richest people in Ukraine.

== Biography ==
He was born on 24 January 1968, in the village of Andriyivka, Busk district, Lviv Oblast.

In 1992, he graduated from the Rivne Institute of Water Management.

== Business activity ==
Founder and co-owner of FIG "Continuum" (Lutsk) with Ihor Yeremeyev. Western Oil Group (WOG) is part of Continuum Group. As of 2023 50% of WOG shares were owned by Ivakhiv ex-wife Svitlana (according to WOG's own documentation).

As of 2019, Ivakhiv's fortune is estimated at $93 million.

== Political activity ==
In 2010 he was elected a deputy of the Volyn regional council in a multi-member constituency on the electoral list of the Volyn regional organization of the Party of Regions. Member of the Standing Committee on International Cooperation, Foreign Economic Relations and Investment.

In the 2012 parliamentary election, he ran for the Verkhovna Rada (Ukraine's parliament) as a self-nominated candidate in Ukraine's 21st electoral district (Kovel, Kovel, Ratniv, Starovyzhiv, Shatsk districts) and won, receiving more than 37% of the vote and less than one percent ahead of Ihor Huz.

On 1 November 2018, he was included in the sanctions list of Russia.

On 29 August 2019, he joined the For the Future faction in the Verkhovna Rada.

Since 29 August 2019, Ivakhiv is First Deputy Chairman of the Verkhovna Rada Committee on Environmental Policy and Nature Management. Member of the Group for Interparliamentary Relations with the Czech Republic since 19 November 2019. Since 18 December 2019, a member of the group for inter-parliamentary relations with Sweden. Member of the Group for Inter-Parliamentary Relations with Slovenia since 18 December 2019. He has been a member of the Inter-Parliamentary Relations Group with Canada since 15 October 2019.

== Criticism ==
According to analysts of the CHESNO Movement, Ivakhiva's company makes money on the "green" tariff.

He was a truant from committee meetings in the Verkhovna Rada of the 8th convocation. He was engaged in non-personal voting. He is a subject of an anti-corruption investigation into political corruption. Voted for dictatorial laws on January 16, 2014.

He was engaged in bribing voters. In particular, the charity fund "Patriots of Volyn" of self-nominated candidate Stepan Ivakhiv presented a blanket and various household appliances to the winners of the nominations during the celebration of the Day of Rostan village in Shatsk district, Volyn region. According to the Civil Network "OPORA", it became known that in September 2014, on the eve of the parliamentary elections, a gift certificate from parliamentary candidate Stepan Ivakhiv for the construction of a stadium near the school was placed in the corridor of secondary school No. 12 in Kovel.
