= People's Will (parliamentary group) =

People's Will Воля народу
- Leader: Yaroslav Moskalenko
- Founded: February 27, 2014
- Dissolved: August 29, 2019
- Headquarters: Verkhovna Rada, Kyiv, Ukraine
- Ideology: Centrism; Pro-Europeanism
- Political position: Centre
- Colours: Green
- Verkhovna Rada: 0 / 450

Website
- volyanarodu.com.ua

People's Will (Ukrainian: Воля народу), formerly known as Sovereign European Ukraine (Ukrainian: Соборна європейська Україна), was a centrist, pro-Europe Ukrainian parliamentary faction in its national parliament Verkhovna Rada.

== History ==
=== Sovereign European Ukraine ===
The faction Sovereign European Ukraine was founded on 27 February 2014. It was founded by MP Ihor Yeremeyev who had till then had not been a member of any faction. The group included 35 MPs. Most of them had been, like Yeremeyev, unaffiliated. According to Yeremeyev not wanting a ministerial post had been one of the conditions that needed to be met to join the faction when it was established.

On its first day the faction with 250 other MPs sign up to join the coalition supporting the Yatsenyuk Government with the Batkivshchyna, UDAR, Svoboda factions and the Economic Development faction and other MPs.

The main policy aim of the faction were European integration and lustration, which is the purge of government officials associated with the past Communist system.

=== People's Will ===
The parliamentary group was revived after the 2014 parliamentary elections in Ukraine by Yeremeyev; but was renamed "People's Will". The new leader of the parliamentary group was again Yeremeyev. Its initial strength was 20 MPs. Late October 2016 the group counted 19 MPs.

Following the 2019 Ukrainian parliamentary election the faction was not revived in the 9th Ukrainian Verkhovna Rada.

== Members ==
Verkhovna Rada
Year	Party-list			Constituency /total	Overall seats won	Seat change	Government	Ref					
Year	Popular vote	%	Seats /total	Constituency /total	Overall seats won	Seat change	Government	Ref					
February 2014	formed during legislative period				35 / 450		Iatseniouk 1		October 2014	none	19/450	19 / 450	▼16

=== Leaders ===
- 2014–2015: Ihor Yeremeyev
- 2015–2019: Yaroslav Moskalenko

== See also ==
- Petro Dyminskyi (WOG (gas stations), Karpaty Lviv, Western Information Corporation ZIK)
