= Pastukh =

Pastukh (Ukrainian: Пастух) is an occupational surname of East Slavic origin, literally meaning "shepherd". Notable people with the surname include:

- Bohdan Pastukh (1924–2008), Ukrainian literary critic, artist, teacher, and public figure
- Ivan Pastukh (born 1998), Ukrainian footballer
- Taras Pastukh (born 1978), Ukrainian politician
- Yevheniy Pastukh (born 2004), Ukrainian footballer
