= Vesnivka (village) =

Rural locality in Ternopil Oblast, Ukraine

Vesnivka Веснівка
- Location in Ternopil Oblast
- Coordinates: 49°26′43″N 25°17′31″E
- Country: Ukraine
- Oblast: Ternopil Oblast
- Raion: Ternopil Raion
- Hromada: Kupchyntsi rural hromada
- Time zone: UTC+2 (EET)
  - Summer (DST): UTC+3 (EEST)
- Postal code: 47661

Vesnivka (Ukrainian: Веснівка) is a village in Kupchyntsi rural hromada, Ternopil Raion, Ternopil Oblast, Ukraine.

== History ==
The village was founded in the 2nd half of the 19th century as a hamlet of Denysiv.

After the liquidation of the Kozova Raion on 19 July 2020, the village became part of the Ternopil Raion.

== Religion ==
- Church of the Ascension.
