= Ivanna Blazhkevych =

Ukrainian writer, activist and educator

- Іванна Блажкевич
- Born: 9 October 1886; Denysiv, now Kupchyntsi rural hromada, Ternopil Raion, Ternopil Oblast
- Died: 2 March 1977 (aged 90); Denysiv, now Kupchyntsi rural hromada, Ternopil Raion, Ternopil Oblast

Ivanna Omelyanivna Blazhkevych (9 October 1886 — 2 March 1977) was a Ukrainian children's writer, public figure, and educator.

== Early life and education ==
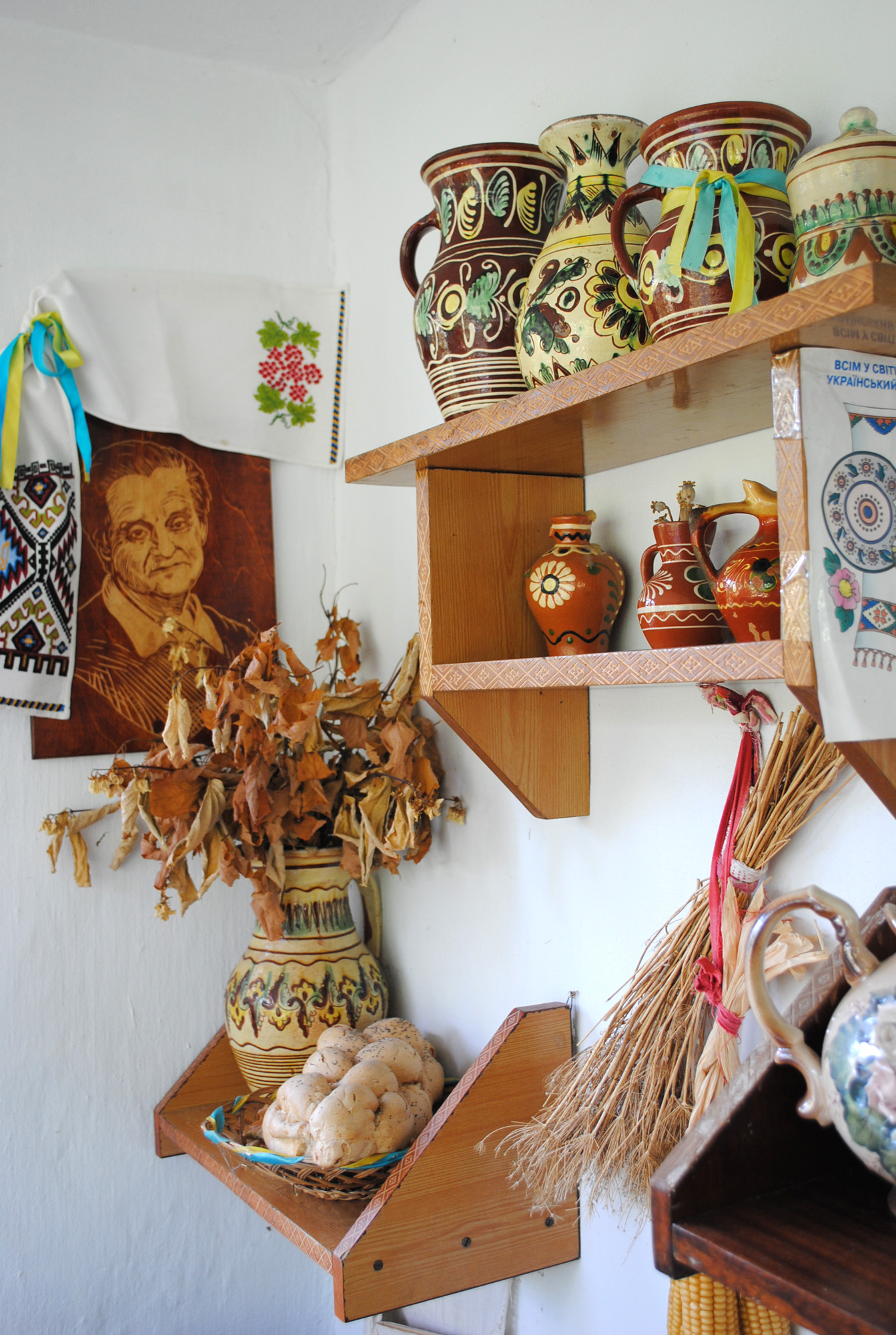
Residence of I.Blazhkevych in Denysiv (now museum)

Ivanna Blazhkevych, maiden surname Borodievych, was born on 9 October 1886 in the village Denysiv, the Kingdom of Galicia and Lodomeria, now Ternopil region, Ukraine. She was the third child in Borodievych's family. Her father was a cultural and public figure and a public teacher. Her mother was of Polish descent, but she considered herself a Ukrainian. Blazhkevych received her primary education in her native village, then studied in the Ternopil seven-year school. Blazhkevych’s brother Yevhen Borodievych fought in the Ukraine Sich Riflemen (USS) and Ukrainian Galician Army (UGA) Legion. He wrote poetry and memoirs and translated works into Ukrainian.

== Work and activity ==
In 1914, Blazhkevych’s husband, Ivan Blazhkevych, was appointed director of the Zalukvyan school. With the beginning of the First World War, he was mobilized to the front. Since then, Blazhkevych was in charge of school affairs. She organized the work of the Farmer's Department, the Self-Help Cooperative, the reading room, and the rescue committee to help those returning from exile. On November 1, 1918, Blazhkevych was in Lviv, where she was among the first to take the oath of allegiance to the Western Ukrainian People's Republic. At the request of Blazhkevych, a hundred young residents of Zalukva took power in Halych on November 2, 1918.

In her memoirs of June 9, 1919, Blazhkevych wrote that in 12 days she had survived 17 searches and 8 arrests, during which, in particular, a bayonet was placed on her son Bohdan’s chest. To avoid persecution, Blazhkevych lived for several months in the woods near the village Krylos and the town of Rozhniativ.

Blazhkevych graduated part-time in 1920 from the Lviv Teachers' Seminary. For a long time, she worked as a teacher and educator of kindergartens in Galician villages and was active in community service among women and youth.

In 1928, Blazhkevych was nominated as a candidate for ambassador to the Sejm by the Ukrainian Socialist Radical Party. The Polish authorities prevented Blazhkevych from running in the election with slander and intimidation. When these means were not sufficient they killed two of her children (two daughters she buried in three days). The next day after her daughter Lyuba's funeral, Blazhkevych received a letter in Polish, in particular, with the words: "The death of your children is the beginning of our revenge."

In 1938, Blazhkevych was severely "pacified" by Polish chauvinists.

In September 1939 Blazhkevych was elected a deputy of the People's Assembly of Western Ukraine. From 1941 to 1943 she was the director of an agricultural school in the village of Denysiv.

In 1963, at the insistence of Iryna Wilde and Oles Honchar, Blazhkevych was admitted to the Writers' Union of Ukraine.

In 1973 Halyna Didyk, an activist, Commander-in-Chief of the Ukrainian Insurgent Army lived in Blazhkevych’s house, from where she was evicted on the instructions of the KGB.

Until the last days of Blazhkevych’s life she worked in the literary field: she wrote memoirs about her meetings with famous writers of the past, new poems for children.

Ivanna Blazhkevych died on 2 March 1976 in her native Denysiv village.

== Private life ==
Blazhkevych’s husband, Ivan Blazhkevych, was a teacher. Two daughters of Blazhkevych, Luba (July 18, 1924 – September 17, 1928) and Sofia (December 8, 1922 – September 14, 1928), were killed by poisoning with chocolate by Polish chauvinists ("some gentleman"). Blazhkevych’s son Bohdan Ivanovych Blazhkevych (August 28, 1912 – October 10, 1986) was Doctor of Technical Sciences, Honored Scientist of the USSR. Blazhkevych also had a daughter, Daria, grandchildren Maria, Yarema, Ivan, and Igor.

Blazhkevych’s brother, Ostap Borodievych, was a Captain of the Ukrainian Galician Army (UGA), Veterinary Officer of the State Secretariat for Military Affairs. Another brother, Eugene Borodievych, was also a Captain of the Ukrainian Galician Army (UGA), commander of the sapper company, writer, and translator.

== Publications ==
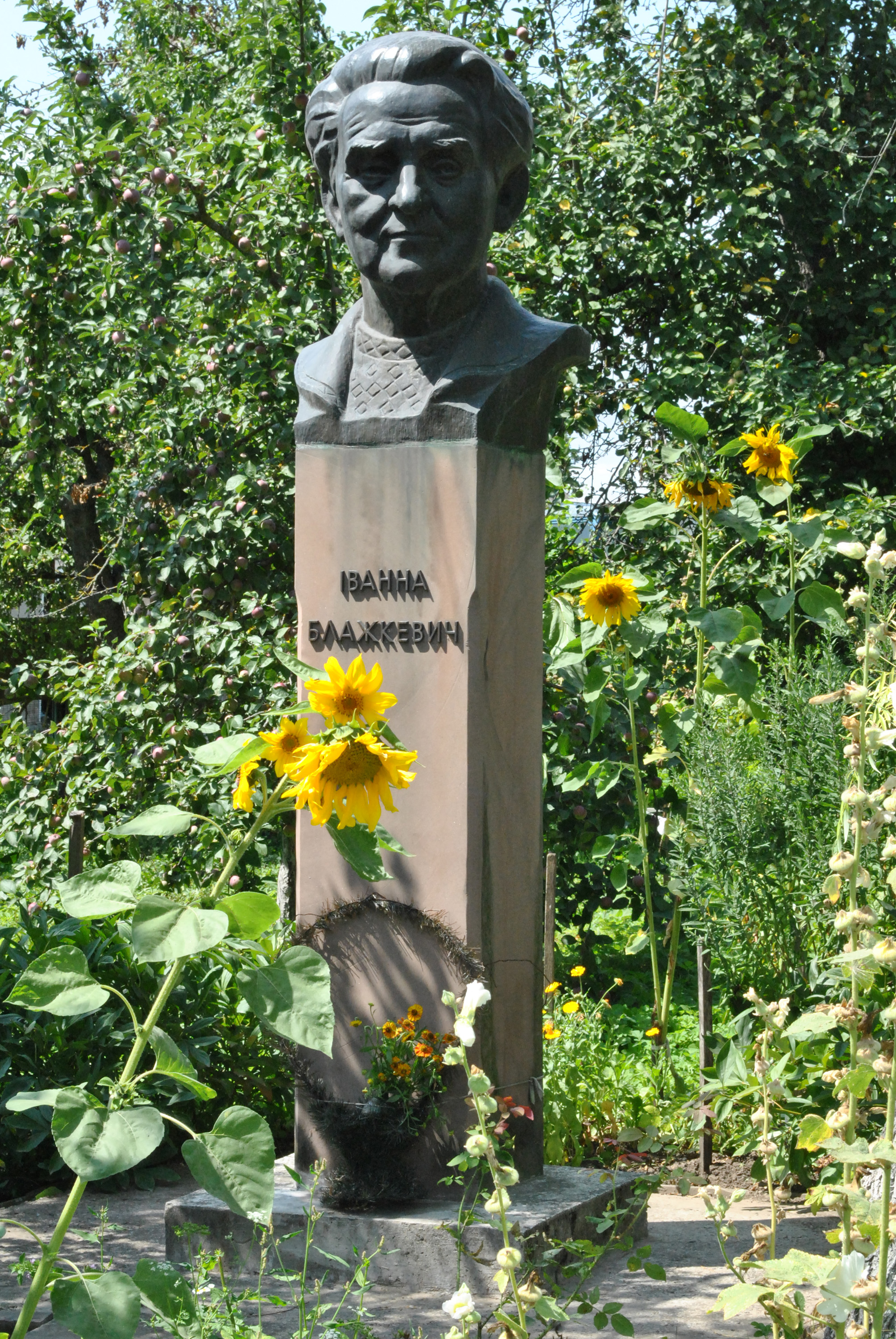
Monument of Blazhkevych in Denysiv

Blazhkevych has written in various genres of children's literature: poetry and drama. Blazhkevych collected songs, aphorisms, and ethnographic materials. She initiated the creation of the Denysiv Museum of Local Lore. She is the author of memoirs about Ivan Franko, Olha Kobylianska, Vasyl Stefanyk, Timothy Bordulyak, Osyp Vitoshynsky, Pavlo Dumka, Kornyl Ustiyanovych, Olena Kulchytska.

=== Poetic collections for children ===
- Podolyanochka
- Storks have arrived
- Is there anything brighter in the world?
- The swallow has arrived

=== Booklets ===
- St. Nicholas in 1920 (about a difficult childhood after the First World War),
- Taras to the Deacon (dedicated to Taras Shevchenko),
- Deed in honor of Taras (dedicated to Taras Shevchenko),
- Ivas-characteristic (about Ivan Franko),
- On Mother's Day
- Story

== Ivanna Blazhkevych Prize ==
In 1993 Ivanna Blazhkevych Prize was founded as an all-Ukrainian literary and artistic prize by the Ternopil Regional Press Office and editor of the magazine "Ternopil" for works for children, pedagogical work, and promotion of the writer's work. Since 2002, the award has received the status of regional literary, it is now awarded by the Ternopil regional organization National Union of the Writers of Ukraine (NSPU).

== Memory ==
A museum manor of Ivanna Blazhkevych was established in her native village of Denysiv.

In the autumn of 1988, a monument of Blazhkevych, a work of sculptor Ivan Mulyarchuk, was erected in Denysiv.

In 1993, the Ivanna Blazhkevych Literary Prize was established, which is awarded annually to Ukrainian writers in her native village on the writer's birthday. The 16th unit of Plast and the Ternopil's General School of Economics Lyceum № 9 are named after Blazhkevych. In early December 2014, a bas-relief of Ivanna Blazhkevych by sculptor Ivan Sonsyadlo was unveiled on the wall of the lyceum school.

== See also ==
- Volodymyr Khoma
