= Vrubivskyi =

Urban locality in Luhansk Oblast, Ukraine

Vrubivskyi Врубівський
- Rural settlement
- Location of Vrubivskyi within Luhansk Oblast#Location of Vrubivskyi within Ukraine Vrubivskyi (Ukraine)
- Coordinates: 48°25′08″N 39°07′09″E
- Country: Ukraine
- Oblast: Luhansk Oblast
- Raion: Luhansk Raion
- Hromada: Lutuhyne urban hromada
- Founded: 1895
- Elevation: 114 m (374 ft)

Population (2022)
  - Total: 1,222
- Time zone: UTC+2 (EET)
  - Summer (DST): UTC+3 (EEST)
- Postal code: 92020
- Area code: +380 6436

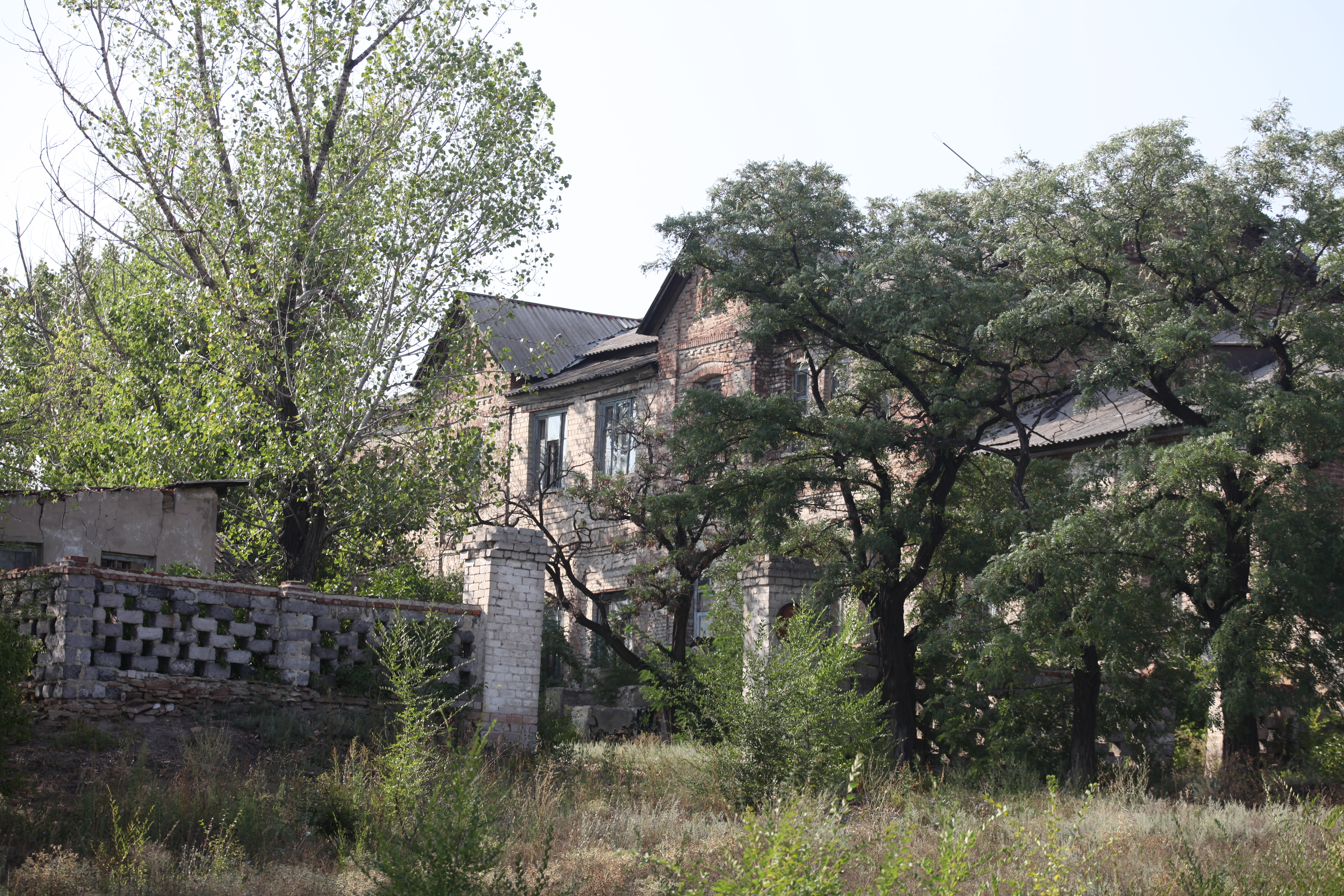
Vrubivs'kyi, Luhans'ka region, Ukraine

Vrubivskyi (Ukrainian: Врубівський) is a rural settlement in Lutuhyne urban hromada, Luhansk Raion, Luhansk Oblast (region), Ukraine. Population: 1,222 (2022 estimate)

== Demographics ==
Native language distribution as of the Ukrainian Census of 2001:

- Ukrainian: 26.24%
- Russian: 73.25%
- Others: 0.17%

== Notable residents ==
- Bohdan Pastukh (1924–2008), Ukrainian literary critic, artist, teacher, public figure
