= Ostrozhets =

Rural locality in Rivne Oblast, Ukraine

Ostrozhets Острожець
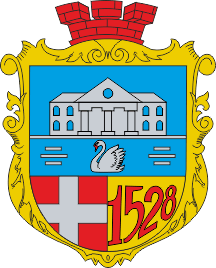
- Coat of arms

- Location in Rivne Oblast Ostrozhets (Ukraine)
- Coordinates: 50°40′18″N 25°33′10″E
- Country: Ukraine
- Oblast: Rivne Oblast
- Raion: Dubno Raion
- Hromada: Ostrozhets rural hromada
- Time zone: UTC+2 (EET)
  - Summer (DST): UTC+3 (EEST)
- Postal code: 35113

Ostrozhets (Ukrainian: Острожець) is a village in the Ostrozhets rural hromada of the Dubno Raion of Rivne Oblast in Ukraine.

== History ==
The first written mention of the village was in 1528.

On 19 July 2020, as a result of the administrative-territorial reform and liquidation of the Mlyniv Raion, the village became part of the Dubno Raion.

== Notable residents ==
- Ivan Muliarchuk (1930–2020), Ukrainian sculptor
- Volodymyr Koziavkin (1947–2022), Ukrainian physician and scientist who earned the title of Hero of Ukraine
- Ihor Yeremeiev (1968–2015), Ukrainian politician
