= Dvoryshche, Ternopil Oblast =

Rural locality in Ternopil Oblast, Ukraine

Dvoryshche Дворище
- Location in Ternopil Oblast
- Coordinates: 49°25′1″N 25°21′23″E
- Country: Ukraine
- Oblast: Ternopil Oblast
- Raion: Ternopil Raion
- Hromada: Kupchyntsi rural hromada
- Time zone: UTC+2 (EET)
  - Summer (DST): UTC+3 (EEST)
- Postal code: 47663

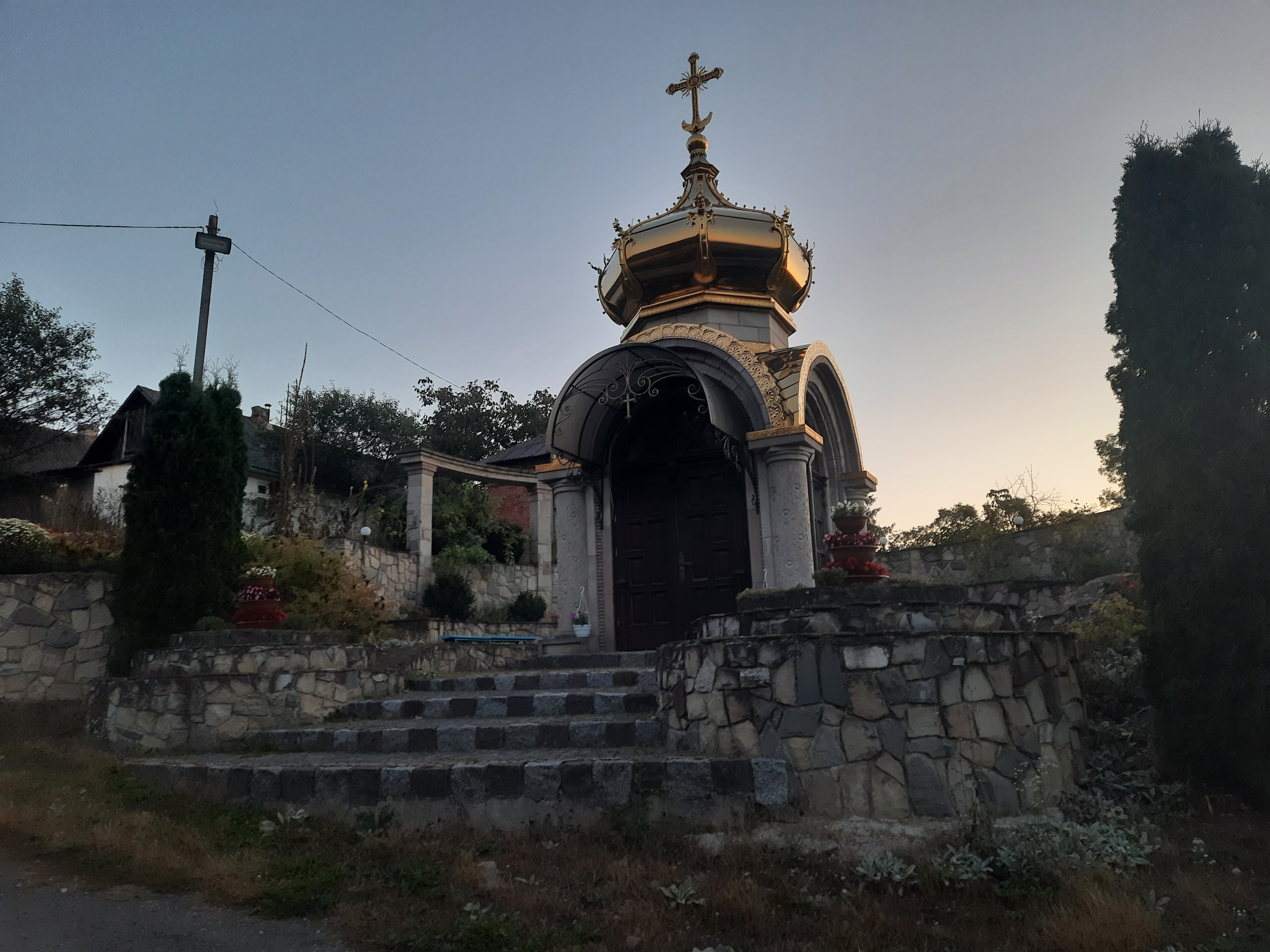
Chapel of the Veil of Our Most Holy Lady (Капличка Покрови Пресвятої Богородиці), in Dvoryshche village.

Dvoryshche (Ukrainian: Дворище) is a village in Kupchyntsi rural hromada, Ternopil Raion, Ternopil Oblast, Ukraine.

== History ==
In the 1930s, more than 60 families lived on the khutir.

After the liquidation of the Kozova Raion on 19 July 2020, the village became part of the Ternopil Raion.

== Religion ==
- Chapel of the Intercession (consecrated in 2011).

== Sources ==
- (in Ukrainian) Сидорак І., Дворище // Ternopil Encyclopedic Dictionary: in 4 v. / editorial board: H. Yavorskyi and other, Ternopil: "Zbruch", 2004, V. 1: А—Й, S. 469. — ISBN 966-528-197-6.
