= Lysivtsi =

Rural locality in Ternopil Oblast, Ukraine

Lysivtsi Лисівці
- Village
- Location within Ternopil Oblast
- Coordinates: 48°51′11″N 25°49′13″E
- Country: Ukraine
- Oblast: Ternopil Oblast
- District: Chortkiv Raion
- Established: 1418

Area
  - Total: 19.790 km^{2} (7.641 sq mi)
- Elevation: 193 m (633 ft)

Population
  - Total: 1,724
  - Density: 98.18/km^{2} (254.3/sq mi)
- Time zone: UTC+2 (EET)
  - Summer (DST): UTC+3 (EEST)
- Postal code: 48631
- Area code: +380 3554
- Website: село Лисівці (in Ukrainian)

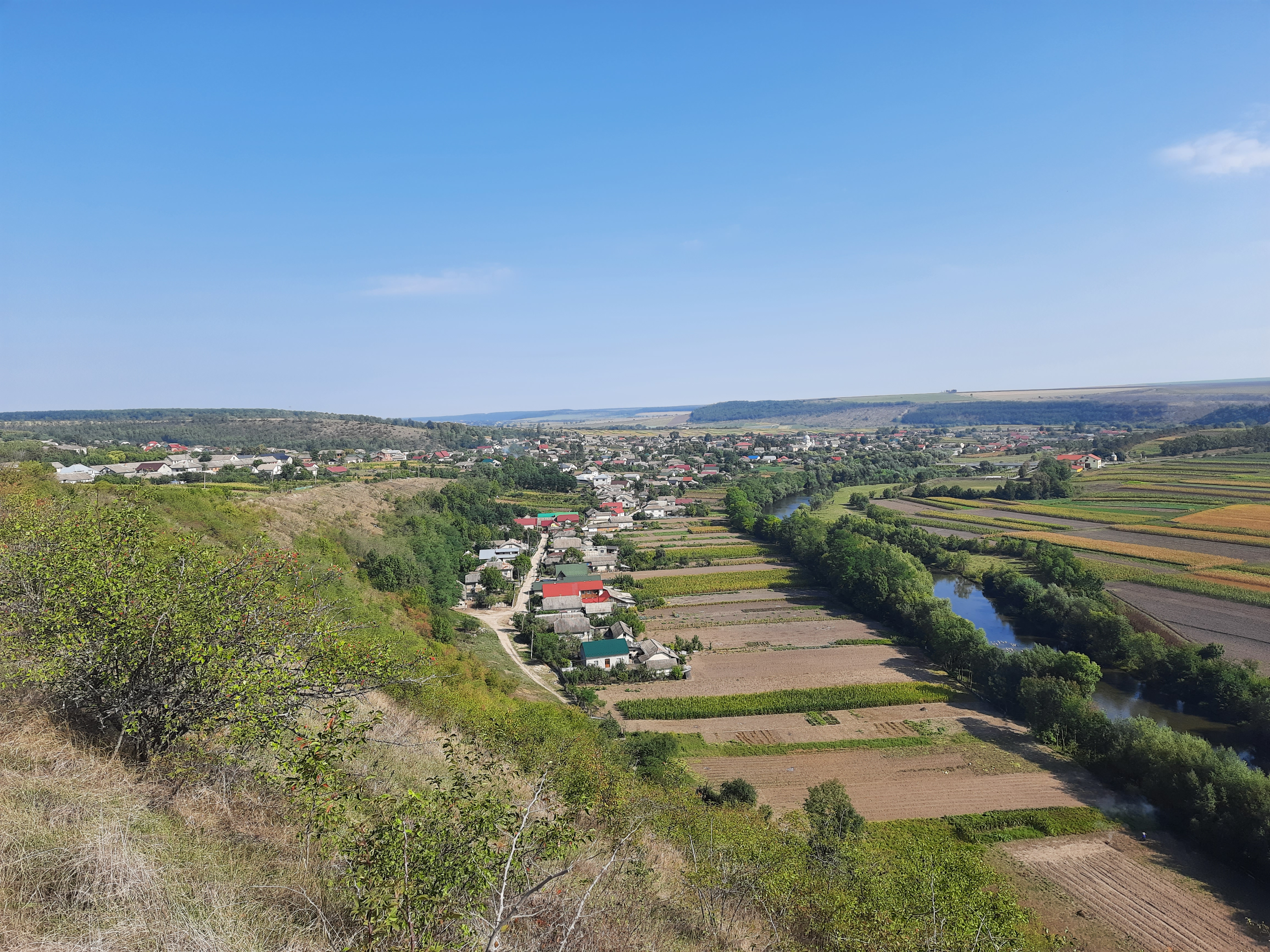
Panorama of the village of Lysivtsi

Lysivtsi (Ukrainian: Лисівці́) is a village (selo) in Chortkiv Raion of Ternopil Oblast (province of Western Ukraine). The population of the village is 1724 people and Local government is administered by Lysivska village council. It belongs to Tovste settlement hromada, one of the hromadas of Ukraine.

== Geography ==
The village Lysivtsi is situated on the right banks of the Seret River which is the left tributary of the Dniester. Area of the village totals is 19.79 km^{2}. The village lies in a valley which is surrounded by low mountains, at the foot of the mountain Lysa.
Village Lysivtsi is a distant from the administrative center of Ternopil 107 kilometres (66 mi), 30 kilometres (19 mi) from the district center Zalischyky and 8 kilometres (5.0 mi) from the urban-type settlement Tovste.

== History and Attractions ==
The date of establishment the village is considered 1418. But archaeological excavations have revealed traces of ancient settlements. Traces of Tripoli culture been found in the village Lysivtsi.

Until 18 July 2020, Lysivtsi belonged to Zalishchyky Raion. The raion was abolished in July 2020 as part of the administrative reform of Ukraine, which reduced the number of raions of Ternopil Oblast to three. The area of Zalishchyky Raion was merged into Chortkiv Raion.

The church of the Intercession of Blessed Virgin Mary is in the village, where preserved icon of the Intercession of the Virgin Mary (17th century).
As well as ruined Roman Catholic church (stone, 1887) has the village.

== Notable residents ==
- Mykhailo Nykolaichuk (born 1946), Ukrainian painter and graphic artist
