= WOG (company) =

Ukrainian gas station chain

- Type: Private
- Industry: Gas and oil (filling stations)
- Founded: 2000
- Headquarters: Lutsk, Ukraine
- Number of locations: More than 400 filling stations
- Key people: Mykhailo Romaniv (CEO)
- Number of employees: 7,000
- Parent: Continuum
- Website: wog.ua

WOG (West Oil Group) is a gas station chain in Ukraine consisting of more than 400 filling stations.

== History ==
In 2000, the first gas station complex under the WOG brand was opened in the village of Tsuman in Volyn.

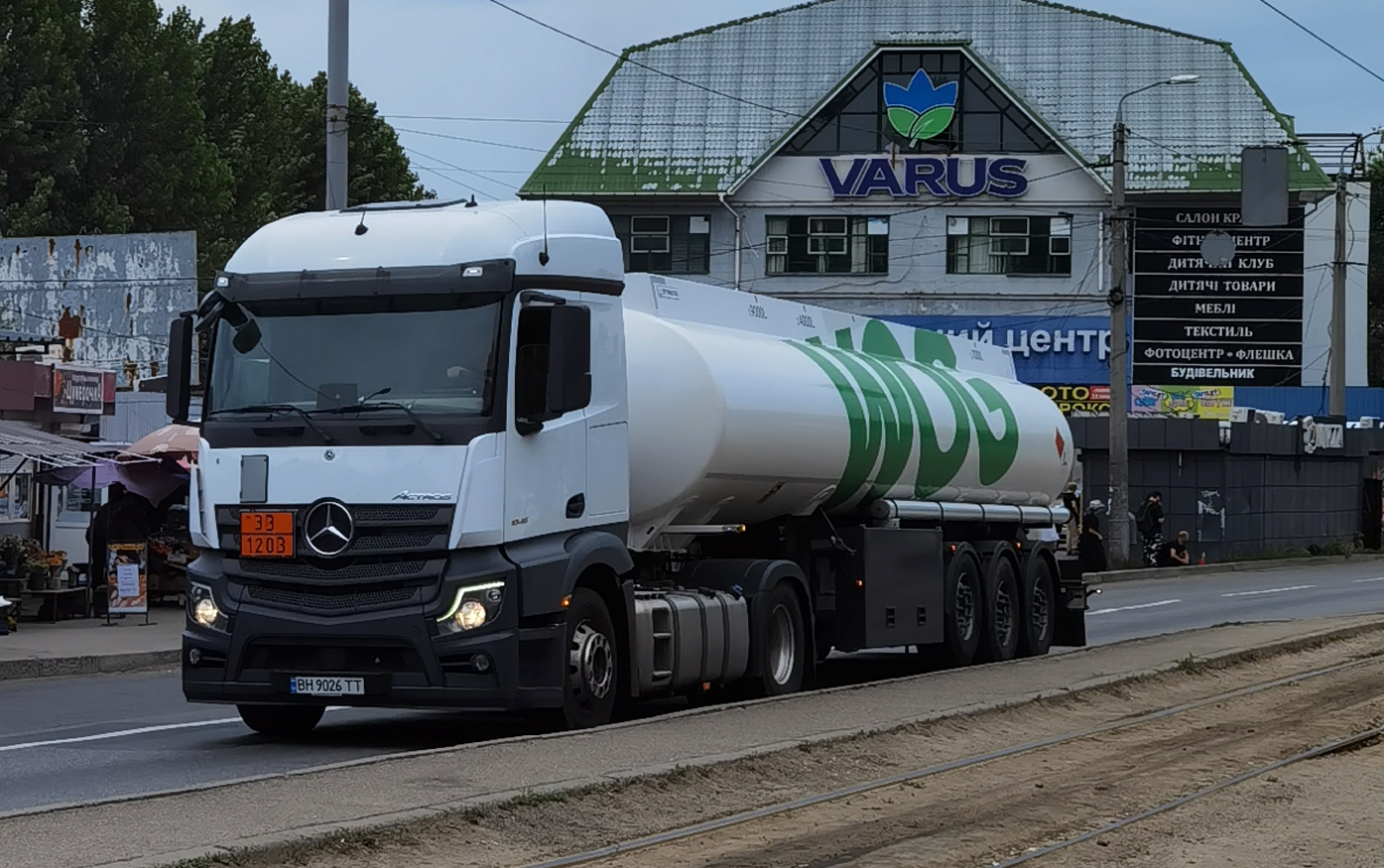
WOG truck

In 2002, WOG had more than 200 filling stations. Filling stations were opened in Kyiv and Odesa in 2006, Chernihiv, Zaporizhzhia, Poltava, Kherson, Luhansk, and Kharkiv Oblasts in 2007, Donetsk Oblast in 2009, Dnipro in 2019.

In 2007, the first Sun Market stores appeared at WOG filling stations. In 2008, WOG started cooperation with the international company Deloitte. In 2009, WOG launched 100 MUSTANG fuel.

In 2010, the loyalty program for PRIDE regular customers started. The company won a number of tenders for the supply of fuel for large state and international enterprises, including SJSC "Motor Roads of Ukraine", "Ukrposhta", mining and processing plant "MetInvest", "ArcelorMittal", "Energoatom", "Ukrzaliznytsia". In 2011, the chain had more than 400 filling stations in Ukraine.

In 2013, WOG started sales of diesel fuel of the new generation MUSTANG +. In 2014, the project "The coffeest coffee" was launched. The same year WOG held a presentation of a branded gas LPG MUSTANG.

In 2015, WOG Cafe in Kyiv was opened, which operates outside filling stations. In 2017, the company launched the WOG Pay service, which allows to refuel a car without leaving it; WOG Cafe was opened at Kyiv Airport (Zhulyany). In 2019, WOG Cafe was opened at the airports of Lviv and Odesa. At the end of the year, there were more than 150 electric chargers in the network, including 37 supercharges.

== Chain ==
Filling stations are represented in 24 regions of Ukraine. As of 2020, the number of employees is 7,000.

WOG includes 20 oil depots and more than 400 filling stations in Ukraine, 368 WOG Cafe, 245 WOG Market. WOG Cafe is also available at 4 airports in Ukraine (Kyiv (Boryspil, Zhulyany), Odesa, Lviv) and on Intercity and Intercity + Ukrzaliznytsia trains.

=== Management ===
WOG belongs to the Continuum fuel and industrial group, which was owned by the main shareholder of WOG Ihor Yeremeyev. After his death in 2015, his children became shareholders of the company together with Stepan Ivakhiv and Sergii Lagur. In 2023 Yeremeyev's wife and children were removed from the list of WOG shareholders; they claimed against their will.

In 2018, Mykhailo Romaniv was appointed CEO. Pavlo Shybaiev is the Head of stores management department WOG.

== Production ==
In autumn 2010, the company began supplying diesel fuel under the Mustang brand. This fuel is imported from refineries in Romania, Greece, Lithuania, Poland, and Belarus.

== Awards ==
- 2009 — WOG brand is recognized as the most expensive among national brands in the field of "Fuel and Energy" ($26.9 million).
- 2010 — the WOG brand was recognized as the most expensive among national brands in the field of "Fuel and Energy" ($33.2 million) according to MPP Consulting.
- 2010–2014 — winner of the nomination "Chain of gas stations of the year" according to the version of "Choice of the Year" in Ukraine.
- 2015 — WOG Cafe won the award in the nomination "Innovation of the Year" business award "Private Label 2015".
- 2016 — the highest capital index of the brand (3.11 – high) according to the marketing research of the international company Nielsen.
- 2018 — 30 position in the rating "TOP-100 most expensive brands of Ukraine" according to MPP Consulting.
- 2020 — victory in the nomination "Most Recognizable VTM of the Year" of the National Business Award "Private Label 2020".

WOG is the second largest oil and gas energy company by sales volume after OKKO for the second year in a row in 2022.

== Other activities ==
The company is implementing the charity project "Road of Good" (Ukrainian: Дорога добра) to help purchase and repair of equipment in medical institutions.

In 2020, during the COVID-19 pandemic, the company participated in a joint program with the taxi service Uklon #TaxiForDonor and, with the assistance of the DonorUA and #WorthLife foundations, provided 20,000 donor trips to blood centers.

The same year WOG started providing 6–8 square meters at gas stations for the stands of small and medium-sized businesses within the project "Opening new opportunities for small and medium-sized businesses".

In 2021, the company supported the "Batteries, give up" (Ukrainian: Батарейки, здавайтесь) initiative to collect and recycle used batteries.

== Corporate social responsibility ==
Since 2006, the company has been running the ‘Road of Goodness’ charity project. As part of this initiative, it has been possible to purchase state-of-the-art, high-cost equipment for medical facilities across the country, thereby saving the lives of thousands of children.

In 2019, the WOG petrol station chain held its first nationwide drawing competition, ‘Create a Christmas Wonder’. It has become a company tradition: every year in the run-up to the New Year holidays, children from all over Ukraine send their drawings to the competition organisers. The three best entries will adorn Christmas mugs, which will be available at WOG CAFE on St Nicholas’ Day — 19 December.

In 2020, as part of the response to Covid-19, the company took part in a joint programme with the Uklon taxi service, #TaxiForDonors, and, with the support of the DonorUA and #WorthLiving foundations, provided 20,000 journeys for donors to blood centres.

The company has launched the ‘Do Good for Nature’ eco-platform, under which waste is sorted and sent for recycling, coffee grounds are reused at petrol stations, and used batteries are collected and sent for recycling (the «Batteries, give yourselves up!» project).

In 2022, WOG focused on supporting and launching its own projects aimed at providing fuel to those who save lives — evacuating wounded soldiers from hotspots, as well as civilians and people with reduced mobility — from areas of active combat.

The ‘Save Fuel for Victory’ initiative aims to promote responsible fuel consumption during the war. A number of Ukrainian and international companies, as well as public figures, have joined the initiative.

‘Do Good’ is a social initiative launched by WOG in partnership with Ukrzaliznytsia and the ‘Tvoya Opora’ Charitable Foundation. WOG has donated a portion of the proceeds from the sale of hot drinks at WOG CAFE on Intercity trains to fund the purchase of expensive medicines for children affected by the war.

‘Dobrobonusi’ is a project launched in partnership with Serhiy Prytula’s Charitable Foundation, through which funds were raised to purchase three specialist ambulances for units of the Ukrainian Armed Forces.

‘Dobropalivo’ is a project being implemented in partnership with Visa. It aims to provide fuel for volunteers from the ‘Zhyttelub’ Charitable Foundation who deliver medicines, food and essential goods directly to the most vulnerable members of the population in areas affected by the conflict.

== Structure and owners ==
WOG is part of FIG "Continuum" (Lutsk) that was founded by Ihor Yeremeyev and Stepan Ivakhiv.

As of 2023 50% of WOG shares were owned by Ivakhiv ex-wife Svitlana and the remaining 50% of the shares by Serhiy Lahur (according to WOG's own documentation). In 2023 Yeremeyev's widow and his two children clamed they were removed from the list of WOG shareholders. Yeremeyev died in 2015.
