= Illia Kuziv =

Ukrainian priest (1874–1916)

- Ілля Кузів
- Born: 25 July 1874; Denysiv, Austria-Hungary (now Ternopil Raion, Ternopil Oblast, Ukraine)
- Died: 14 November 1916 (aged 42); Northampton, Pennsylvania, US
- Education: Lviv University

Illia (Ilko) Stepanovych Kuziv (Ukrainian: Ілля Степанович Кузів; 25 July 1874, Denysiv, now Ternopil Raion, Ternopil Oblast – 14 November 1916, Northampton, Pennsylvania, US) was a Ukrainian Greek Catholic priest, writer, translator, publicist, and folklorist. He was the brother of Mykhailo Kuziv.

== Biography ==
Graduated from the gymnasium in Ternopil, where he began recording folk songs, which he sent to Ivan Franko. Studied theology at Lviv University.

In 1900, he was ordained a priest by Metropolitan Andrey Sheptytsky. Taught at the Lviv Theological Seminary; was the secretary of the society "Bourgeois Reading Room of Prosvita", a teacher, rector, and secretary (of the board in Berezhany) of the Ruska Bursa. At the same time, he became friends with Tymotei Borduliak and Osyp Makovei; he continued his folklore and ethnographic activities under the influence of Ivan Franko.

Since 1901, he has been in the United States; he served in the parishes of Wilkes-Barre (1909–1911) and Olyphant (1911–1915) in Pennsylvania.

== Works ==
In 1900, he published the work "Korotkyi pohliad na istoriiu chytalni Ruskoi dukhovnoi seminarii u Lvovi".

Translated short stories by Slovenian writers F. Meško, J. Krek, and J. Stritar, (all in 1900), and the novel "The Adventures of Huckleberry Finn" by Mark Twain, with whom he was on friendly terms.

At the suggestion of Fr. Kuziv, the Slovenian cultural activist J. Šlebinger translated Taras Shevchenko's Kobzar.

The recordings of folk songs of various genres made by Fr. Kuziv are kept in the collections of the Taras Shevchenko Institute of Literature and the Rylsky Institute of Art Studies, Folklore and Ethnology (Kyiv).
