= Olha Vasylevska-Smahliuk =

Ukrainian politician

- Ольга Василевська-Смаглюк
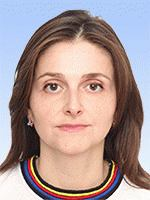

People's Deputy of Ukraine
- Incumbent
- Assumed office 29 August 2019
- Preceded by: Yaroslav Moskalenko
- Constituency: Kyiv Oblast, No. 96

Personal details
- Born: 23 June 1985 (age 41) Starokostiantyniv, Ukrainian SSR, Soviet Union (now Ukraine)
- Party: Servant of the People
- Other political affiliations: Independent
- Education: Kyiv International University; National Academy of Statistics, Accounting, and Auditing

Olha Mykhailivna Vasylevska-Smahliuk (Ukrainian: Ольга Михайлівна Василевська-Смаглюк; born 23 June 1985) Ukrainian journalist, Member of Parliament of Ukraine of the 9th convocation, elected from the 96th single-mandate constituency, member of the Parliamentary faction of Servants of the People, Chair of the Subcommittee on the Functioning of Payment and Information Systems and Prevention of Money Laundering of the Verkhovna Rada Committee on Finance, Tax and Customs Policy.

== Early life and career ==
Olha Mykhailivna Vasylevska-Smahliuk was born on 23 June 1985 in the city of Starokostiantyniv in Ukraine's western Khmelnytskyi Oblast.

She graduated from the Institute of Journalism, Cinema and Television of Kyiv International University in 2009 with a degree in journalism. She graduated from the National Academy of Statistics, Accounting, and Auditing, specialising in accounting. Since 2019 she has been studying at the postgraduate programme of this academy. She completed an internship with the international investigative network Bellingcat. She also studied at the Lee Kuan Yew School of Public Policy at the National University of Singapore.

Before being elected to Parliament, she worked for over 15 years as a journalist for the newspapers The Day, "Delo", the online edition "Glavred" and the TV and radio company "1+1". She is the author of high-profile anti-corruption investigations.

In 2023, she became the most effective MP of the year according to the "Statesman of the Year" award of the Kyiv School of Public Administration named after Nyzhnyi for her personal contribution to the evacuation of citizens and the provision of humanitarian aid to residents of Kyiv region.

== Political career ==
In the 2019 Ukrainian parliamentary election, Vasylevska-Smahliuk ran for the office of People's Deputy of Ukraine in Ukraine's 96th electoral district, located in northern Kyiv Oblast. She was the candidate of Servant of the People, though at the time of the election she was an independent. She was successfully elected, defeating independent incumbent Yaroslav Moskalenko with 41.85% of the vote to Moskalenko's 18.03%.

In the Verkhovna Rada (parliament of Ukraine), Vasylevska-Smahliuk joined the Servant of the People faction, as well as the Verkhovna Rada Committee on Finances, Taxes, and Customs Policy and inter-factional associations "A Country Accessible to Everyone" and "For Khmelnychchyna".

She is the author and co-author of more than 150 bills and draft resolutions registered by the Verkhovna Rada of Ukraine.

In November–December 2019, Olha Vasylevska-Smahliuk was responsible for preparing the second reading of the draft law 2179 on preventing and countering the legalisation (laundering) of the proceeds of crime, terrorist financing and the financing of the proliferation of weapons of mass destruction. On 11 February, the European Parliament took note of the law adopted as a result of this process in its report on Ukraine's implementation of the EU-Ukraine Association Agreement.

In 2021, she authored and was responsible for the preparation for consideration and adoption by the Verkhovna Rada of Ukraine of the Law "On Payment Services", which, according to the National Bank of Ukraine, created conditions for the further development of payment products, services and innovations.

One of the authors of the Law of Ukraine "On the Bureau of Economic Security of Ukraine" and "On Amendments to Section II "Final and Transitional Provisions" of the Law of Ukraine "On Amendments to the Tax Code of Ukraine on Improvement of the Investment Climate in Ukraine" in relation to the entry into force of certain provisions", which in 2021 liquidated the Tax Police and established the Bureau of Economic Security of Ukraine.

In the same year, 2021, she initiated the elimination of the shadow market of financial debt collection by drafting and ensuring the adoption by the Verkhovna Rada of Ukraine of the Law of Ukraine "On Amendments to Certain Laws of Ukraine on Consumer Protection in the Settlement of Overdue Debts", which was welcomed by the National Bank of Ukraine as the first law in Ukrainian legislation providing clear legal regulation of the work of debt collection companies and creditors in the settlement of overdue debts. The adoption of the law has provided the National Bank of Ukraine with real mechanisms to influence companies that behave unethically towards consumers when collecting debts.

Olha Vasylevska-Smahliuk is the author of Draft Law 6003 "On Amendments to Certain Laws of Ukraine on Improvement of Mechanisms of Validation of Information on Ultimate Beneficial Owners and Ownership Structure of Legal Entities". The mechanism proposed by Olga Vasilevska-Smagliuk in Draft Law 6003 was fully incorporated into Draft Law 6320 "On Amendments to Certain Laws of Ukraine on Simplifying the Procedure of Submission of Information Required for Financial Monitoring" during the preparation of Draft Law 6320 for consideration in the second reading.

In 2023, she was responsible for preparing the second reading of the law introducing the permanent status of publicly exposed persons in order to prevent the legalisation of illegally obtained funds by public officials. The adoption of this law was one of the requirements for European integration and one of the structural benchmarks of the International Monetary Fund, and was necessary both for receiving financial assistance from the IMF and for the decision to start negotiations on EU accession.

She is also the initiator of draft law 9422, which introduces mechanisms that would allow Ukrainians to have a microcredit market where both lenders and borrowers behave responsibly in lending. It introduces a legal cap on consumer loan interest rates of 1% per day (with a transition period of 240 days), tightens requirements for assessing borrowers' creditworthiness, empowers the NBU to set additional requirements for such assessment and to use professional judgement in supervision, requires lenders to provide information on all consumer loans to credit bureaus, and prohibits unilateral automatic renewal of loan agreements.

From 24 October 2019 to 17 June 2020 Olha Vasylevska-Smahliuk was the head of the first Provisional Investigative Commission established by the Verkhovna Rada of Ukraine of the IX convocation - the Provisional Investigative Commission of the Verkhovna Rada of Ukraine to investigate compliance with the requirements of the law during the change of ownership of news channels and to ensure counteraction to the information influence of the Russian Federation. The Commission's tasks included, inter alia, a comprehensive review of the circumstances of acquisition, sources of payment and receipt of funds during the change of ownership of the NewsOne, 112 Ukraine and ZIK TV channels. According to the Commission, the cash flows used by Taras Kozak to purchase and finance TV channels could have been channelled through offshore companies to accounts in Russian and Belarusian banks. Taras Kozak was questioned by the Security Service of Ukraine Security Service of Ukraine in this case, but refused to testify. In order to investigate the full chain of financing, Ukraine, through the relevant law enforcement agencies, prepared an appeal to other states for international legal assistance.

From 13 December 2022 to date, Olha Vasylevska-Smahliuk has been the Deputy Chairman of the Temporary Investigative Commission of the Verkhovna Rada of Ukraine to investigate possible violations of Ukrainian legislation by officials of the Bureau of Economic Security of Ukraine, state authorities and other state bodies exercising powers in the field of economic security, which may result in a reduction of revenues to the state and local budgets.

Drafted the resolution condemning the activities of the radical Islamic organisation Hamas and recognising it as a terrorist organisation.

She is the initiator and author of the Call of the Verkhovna Rada of Ukraine to the members of the Financial Action Task Force on Money Laundering (FATF) to exclude the Russian Federation from FATF membership and to include it in the list of high-risk countries, which was supported by 305 Ukrainian MPs.

She initiated and authored the text of the Call of the Verkhovna Rada of Ukraine to the United Nations, the European Union, the European Council, the Organization for Security and Cooperation in Europe, parliaments and governments of the member states of the International Atomic Energy Agency to condemn the act of nuclear terrorism committed by the aggressor at the Zaporizhzhia Nuclear Power Plant in Enerhodar, Zaporizhzhia region.

She was a speaker at the 22nd Parliamentary Forum on Intelligence and Security in Bucharest. In her speech, she criticised the FATF for failing to suspend and blacklist the Russian Federation.

During the full-scale invasion, she organised a headquarters for the distribution of humanitarian aid, participated in the evacuation of the population, and together with the NGO Dobrobat organised the repair of damaged houses in the Dymer, Borodyanka, and Ivankiv communities of Kyiv region, together with UNICEF UKRAINE, rebuilt 10 shelters in schools and kindergartens in the de-occupied Kyiv region, restored the outpatient clinic in Zahaltsi, and repaired the Vyshgorod Public Library and the Klavdiyivska Village Library, a branch of the Nemishayivo Public Library.

== Awards ==
Vasilevskaya-Smaglyuk in 2019 was included in the list of "100 most influential women of Ukraine" compiled by Focus weekly.

== Family ==
Husband - Ihor Smahliuk, military man, infantryman of the 241st brigade of the 243rd battalion of the Armed Forces of Ukraine, participates in battles in the Donbass.

They are raising two daughters together – Eliana and Alexandra.
