= Rosokhuvatets, Kupchyntsi rural hromada, Ternopil Raion, Ternopil Oblast =

Rural locality in Ternopil Oblast, Ukraine

Rosokhuvatets Росохуватець
- Location in Ternopil Oblast
- Coordinates: 49°24′22″N 25°18′38″E
- Country: Ukraine
- Oblast: Ternopil Oblast
- Raion: Ternopil Raion
- Hromada: Kupchyntsi rural hromada
- Time zone: UTC+2 (EET)
  - Summer (DST): UTC+3 (EEST)
- Postal code: 47663

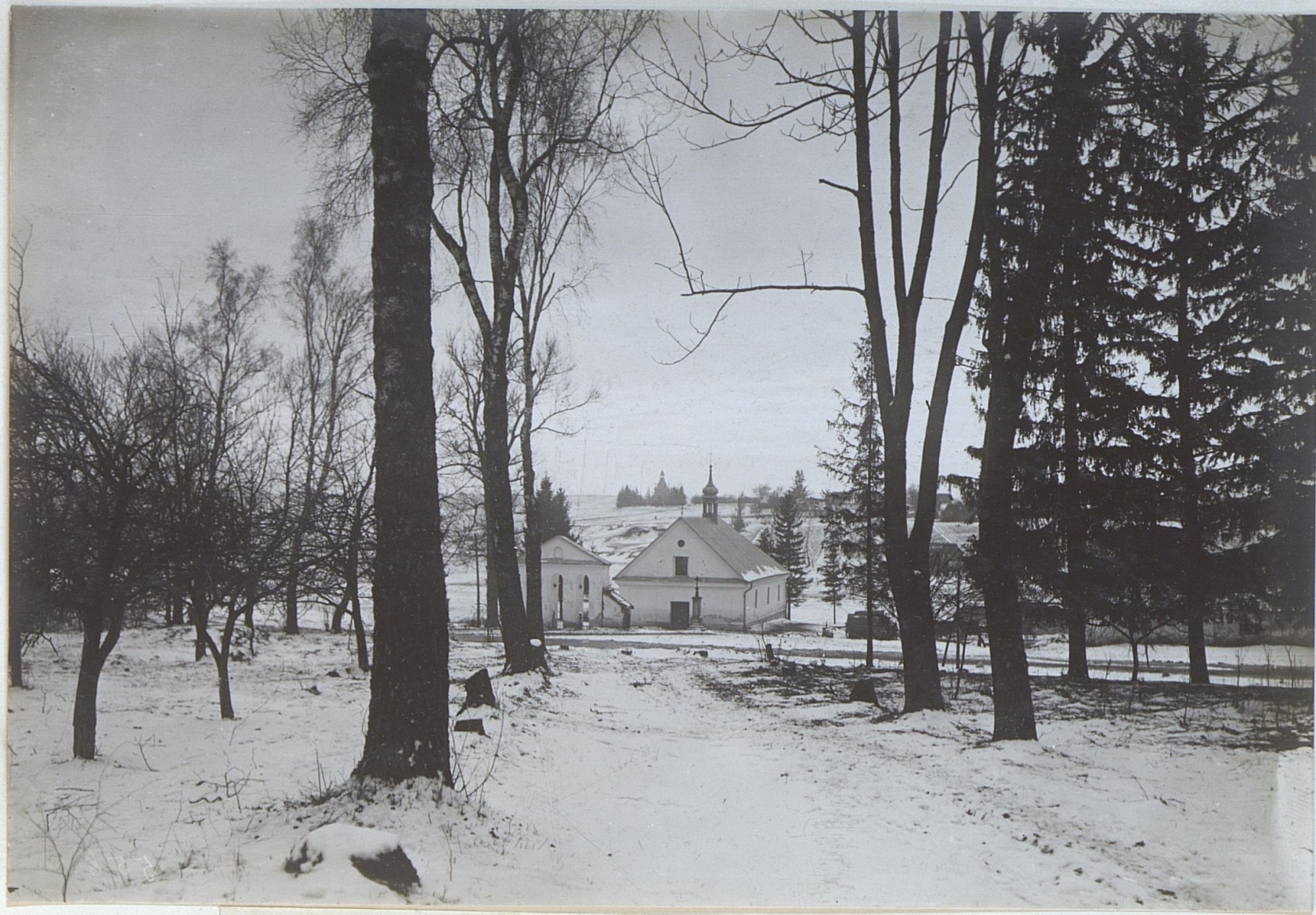

Rosokhuvatets (Ukrainian: Росохуватець) is a village in Kupchyntsi rural hromada, Ternopil Raion, Ternopil Oblast, Ukraine.

== History ==
The first written mention of the village was in 1559.

After the liquidation of the Kozova Raion on 19 July 2020, the village became part of the Ternopil Raion.

== Religion ==
- Church of the Assumption (1992, rebuilt from a Roman Catholic church).

== Sources ==
- (in Ukrainian) Гуцал П., Уніят В., Росохуватець // Ternopil Encyclopedic Dictionary: in 4 v. / editorial board: H. Yavorskyi and other, Ternopil: "Zbruch", 2008, V. 3: П—Я, S. 198. — ISBN 978-966-528-279-2.
- "Rosochowaciec (1)". Geographical Dictionary of the Kingdom of Poland (in Polish). 9. Warszawa: Kasa im. Józefa Mianowskiego. 1888. p. 762.
