= Isydore Hlynka =

Canadian biochemist (1909–1983)

Isydore Hlynka (February 17, 1909 – May 18, 1983) was a Canadian biochemist, and Ukrainian Canadian community leader. He was born in the village of Denysiv, near Ternopil. He came to Canada at age one in 1910 with his parents, who homesteaded near Delph, Alberta, north of Vegreville.

== Education ==
Hlynka finished his elementary schooling in a one-room school house, which was located in a corner of his father's farm. He attended high school in Edmonton. He received Bachelor's and Master's degrees in chemistry from the University of Alberta. He then attended the California Institute of Technology and received his PhD in biochemistry in 1939.

== Career ==
Hlynka worked in Ottawa, Ontario from 1939 to 1947. In 1947, Dr. Hlynka took a position at the Grain Research Laboratory in Winnipeg, Manitoba where he lived for the rest of his life. He published over a hundred refereed journal papers, mainly on biochemistry applied to wheat, and bread quality. For his research, he was the first winner of the Brabender Award (1967) for the application of rheology in milling and baking, and was a winner of the Osborne Gold Medal in Cereal Chemistry (1976). The American Association of Cereal Chemists, Rheology Section, in which Dr. Hlynka was active, named the Isydore Hlynka Best Student Paper Award in his honor. While at the Grain Research Laboratory in Winnipeg, he supervised postdoctoral students and visiting scientists from many countries, including Japan, the United Kingdom, Yugoslavia, Bulgaria, and the Netherlands. He was the editor/author of one book on cereal chemistry, entitled "Wheat, Chemistry and Technology." For years, this book was a standard reference (and was translated into the Russian language and used in the Soviet Union).

Dr. Hlynka was active in the Ukrainian Canadian community. His brother, Anthony Hlynka, was the second Member of Parliament of Ukrainian ancestry in the House of Commons of Canada (Vegreville, 1940–1949). Dr. Hlynka wrote many of the commentaries which appeared in the Ukrainian Canadian Committee national bulletin in the 1950s.

Dr. Hlynka was a pioneer in the concept of multiculturalism in Canada. In 1963, he wrote and presented the Ukrainian Canadian Committee's submission to the Royal Commission on Bilingualism and Biculturalism in Ottawa. His submission was the first of any non-British, non-French ethnic group. Dr. Hlynka argued that Canada was in fact multilingual and multicultural, with two main working languages – Quebec's working language being mainly French, and the rest of Canada having English as a working language. His presentation received major news coverage across Canada and set the tone for all other ethnic groups to follow. In succeeding years, Dr. Hlynka wrote many articles and gave many speeches on the subject of multiculturalism. From 1971-1983, he wrote a weekly English language newspaper column for Winnipeg-based Ukrainsky Holos (The Ukrainian Voice), with the title "Behind the Official Languages Curtain", under the pseudonym Ivan Harmata. Selections from that column were published in book form with the title "The Other Canadians." Simultaneously with the newspaper column, Dr. Hlynka had a Ukrainian language weekly commentary on radio station CKJS in Winnipeg, on the same topics.

Dr. Hlynka was the founding president of the Ukrainian Canadian Foundation of Taras Shevchenko. From its inception in 1963, he was president for its first fifteen years. Dr. Hlynka was an executive member of the Board of Directors of St. Andrew's College (Winnipeg). He was an executive member of the National Presidium of Ukrainian Canadian Committee. He was active with the Ukrainian Cultural and Educational Centre in Winnipeg and with the Ukrainian Canadian Professional and Business Association.

== Published works ==
- Hlynka, Isydore (1981). The Other Canadians (selected articles from the column of "Ivan Harmata," pseudonym for Isydore Hlynka). Winnipeg: Trident Press.
- Hlynka, Isydore, ed. (1964). Wheat, Chemistry, and Technology. St. Paul, Minnesota: American Association of Cereal Chemists.

== Awards and honours ==
- Carl Wilhelm Brabender Award in Rheology (1967). Presented by the American Association of Cereal Chemists to an outstanding worker in applied rheology. Hlynka was the first recipient.
- Osborne Gold Medal in Cereal Chemistry. The Thomas Burr Osborne Medal is awarded by the AACC to an individual whose research in cereal chemistry has contributed significantly to the progress of the science.
- Honorary Doctorate of Science from the University of Manitoba (1975)
- Canadian Centennial Medal (1967)
- Shevchenko Medal (1968) from the Ukrainian Canadian Committee
- Osvita Foundation Honouree (posthumously, 1984). The Osvita Foundation promotes the Ukrainian English bilingual program in Manitoba.
- Ukrainian Canadian Congress' 100 most prominent Ukrainian Canadians of the Past Century Award (1992)
