= Yastrubove =

Rural locality in Ternopil Oblast, Ukraine

Yastrubove Яструбове
- Location in Ternopil Oblast
- Coordinates: 49°28′7″N 25°21′24″E
- Country: Ukraine
- Oblast: Ternopil Oblast
- Raion: Ternopil Raion
- Hromada: Kupchyntsi rural hromada
- Time zone: UTC+2 (EET)
  - Summer (DST): UTC+3 (EEST)
- Postal code: 47661

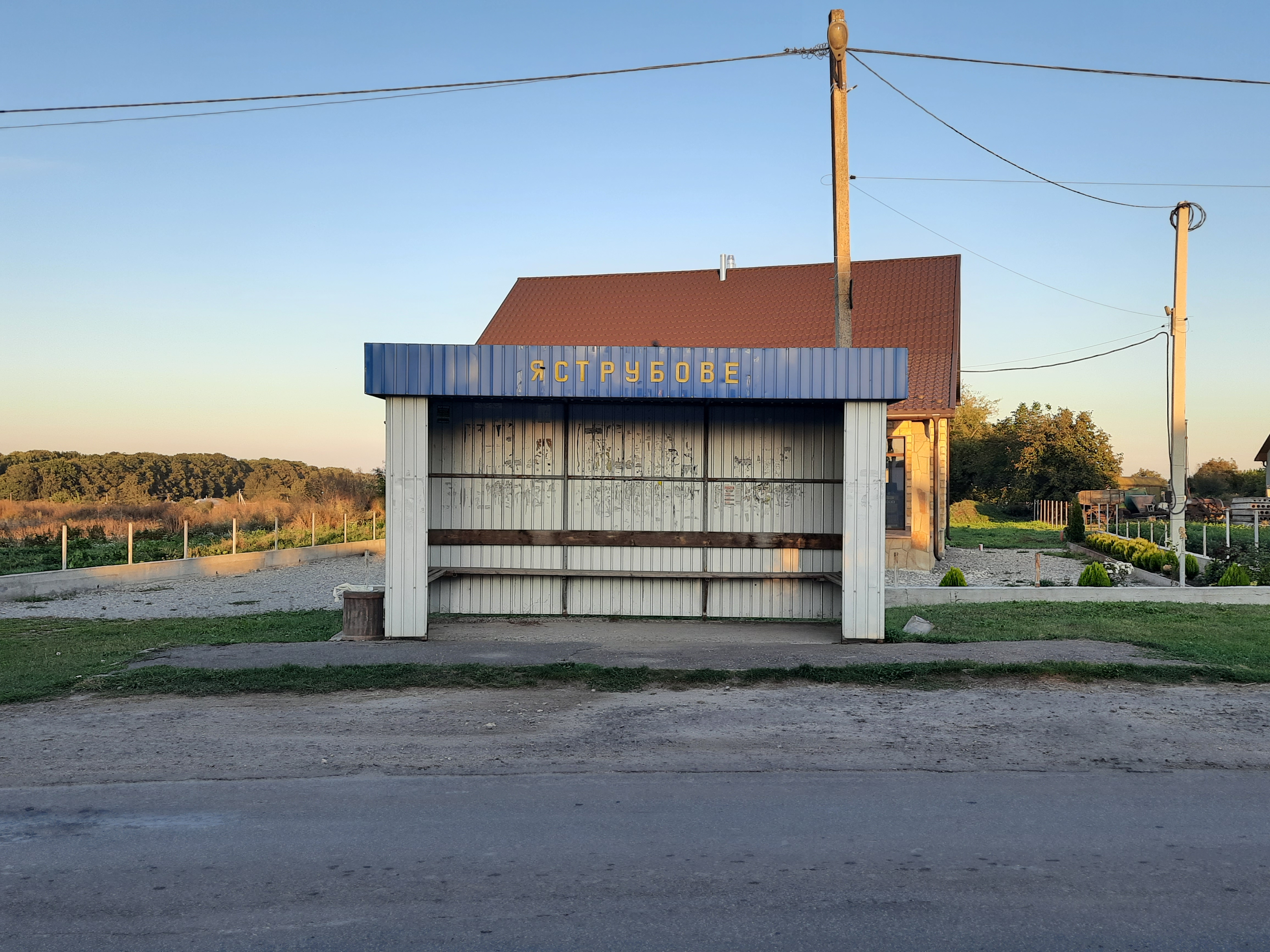
Bus stop in Yastrubove

Yastrubove (Ukrainian: Яструбове) is a village in Kupchyntsi rural hromada, Ternopil Raion, Ternopil Oblast, Ukraine.

== History ==
The first written mention of the village was in 1897.

After the liquidation of the Kozova Raion on 19 July 2020, the village became part of the Ternopil Raion.

== Religion ==
- Holy Eucharist church (2003, brick, UGCC).

== Sources ==
- (in Ukrainian) Мельничук Б., Яструбове // Ternopil Encyclopedic Dictionary: in 4 v. / editorial board: H. Yavorskyi and other, Ternopil: "Zbruch", 2008, V. 3: П—Я, S. 696. — ISBN 978-966-528-279-2.
