= Drahomanivka, Ternopil Oblast =

Rural locality in Ternopil Oblast, Ukraine

Drahomanivka Драгоманівка
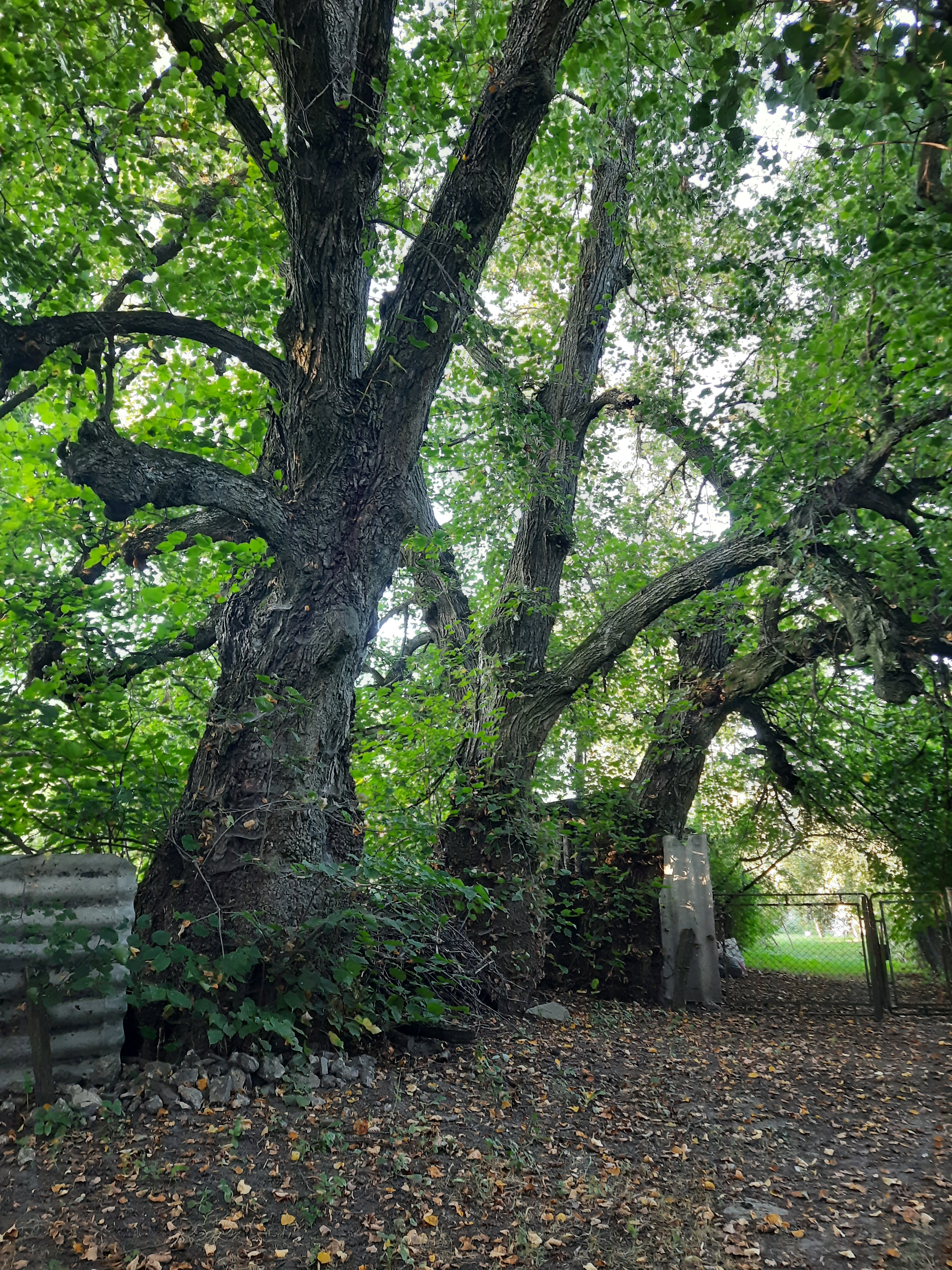
- Three linden trees planted by Ivan Franko

- Location in Ternopil Oblast
- Coordinates: 49°25′27″N 25°24′7″E
- Country: Ukraine
- Oblast: Ternopil Oblast
- Raion: Ternopil Raion
- Hromada: Kupchyntsi Hromada
- First settled: 1876
- Time zone: UTC+2 (EET)
  - Summer (DST): UTC+3 (EEST)
- Postal code: 47662

Drahomanivka (Ukrainian: Драгоманівка) is a village in Kupchyntsi rural hromada, Ternopil Raion, Ternopil Oblast, Ukraine.

== History ==
The first settler of the village was Petro Bilyi, who built a house there in 1876, and dug a well and a pond for fish farming. Later, Stefan Harmatii built a house next to his, and then others followed suit. The hamlet was named Mykytsivka (Mykytivka) after the first settler, Bilyi, whose family was called Mykytsi.

In 1890, Stefan Harmatii, one of the village's wealthiest landowners, wanted the village to be called Harmatiivka, but the poet and well-known cultural and public figure Pavlo Dumka (who settled in the town in 1895) and the prominent Ukrainian poet Ivan Franko advised the residents to name the settlement Drahomanivka in honor of the great Ukrainian scientist and writer, prominent public figure Mykhailo Drahomanov. This name was formally established after the First World War.

After the liquidation of the Kozova Raion on 19 July 2020, the village became part of the Ternopil Raion.
