= Choice of the Year Ukraine =

Annual project-competition in Ukraine

Choice of the Year Ukraine is a national annual competition in Ukraine with the objective of determining the most popular and highest quality products and services on the domestic market. The Choice of the Year award ceremony is held annually close to the end of the calendar year. Companies that win receive a patented golden medal, designed specifically corresponding to the year of the award, are granted the exclusive right to use the winning Choice of the Year logo on their products' labeling and packaging for the following year. The name and logo are patented according to law of Ukraine.

== Organization ==
Choice of the Year Ukraine was founded in 2001 and the award ceremony following the marketing research to determine the winners in each product category has been held every year since. Subsidiaries of Choice of the Year are now opened in Ukraine, Kazakhstan, Belarus, Kyrgyzstan and Uzbekistan. Up to these days 112 companies, 37 foreign and 75 Ukrainian companies in 183 nominations have taken part in competition. In 2013, more than 250 nominations were offered to Ukrainian companies in order to participate in the contest and gain national recognition.

== Determining winners ==
The determination of the winner is conducted through thorough marketing research and analysis, which is held by research by well renowned international marketing research company – TNS-BMRB TNS Ukraine. Moreover, these results are verified and undergone additional audit by Deloitte Ukraine to guarantee the accuracy and transparency of results.

== Golden medal ==
Original Choice of the Year Ukraine golden medal is an original trademark which is used as an award to be used on packaging, labeling and other branding purposes of a winner company. Medal serves a purpose of increasing brand loyalty, providing competitive advantage and affecting the purchasing decision of a consumer due to a championship and leadership status attached to a medal image.

== Annual ceremony ==
Choice of the Year annual ceremony of winners is the main event of the year. It includes official presentation of award and a celebration concert.

== International conference ==
The closing point of the yearly competition is an international conference on topics such as brand development, marketing, etc.
