= Kupchyntsi, Ternopil Oblast =

Rural locality in Ternopil Oblast, Ukraine

Kupchyntsi Купчинці
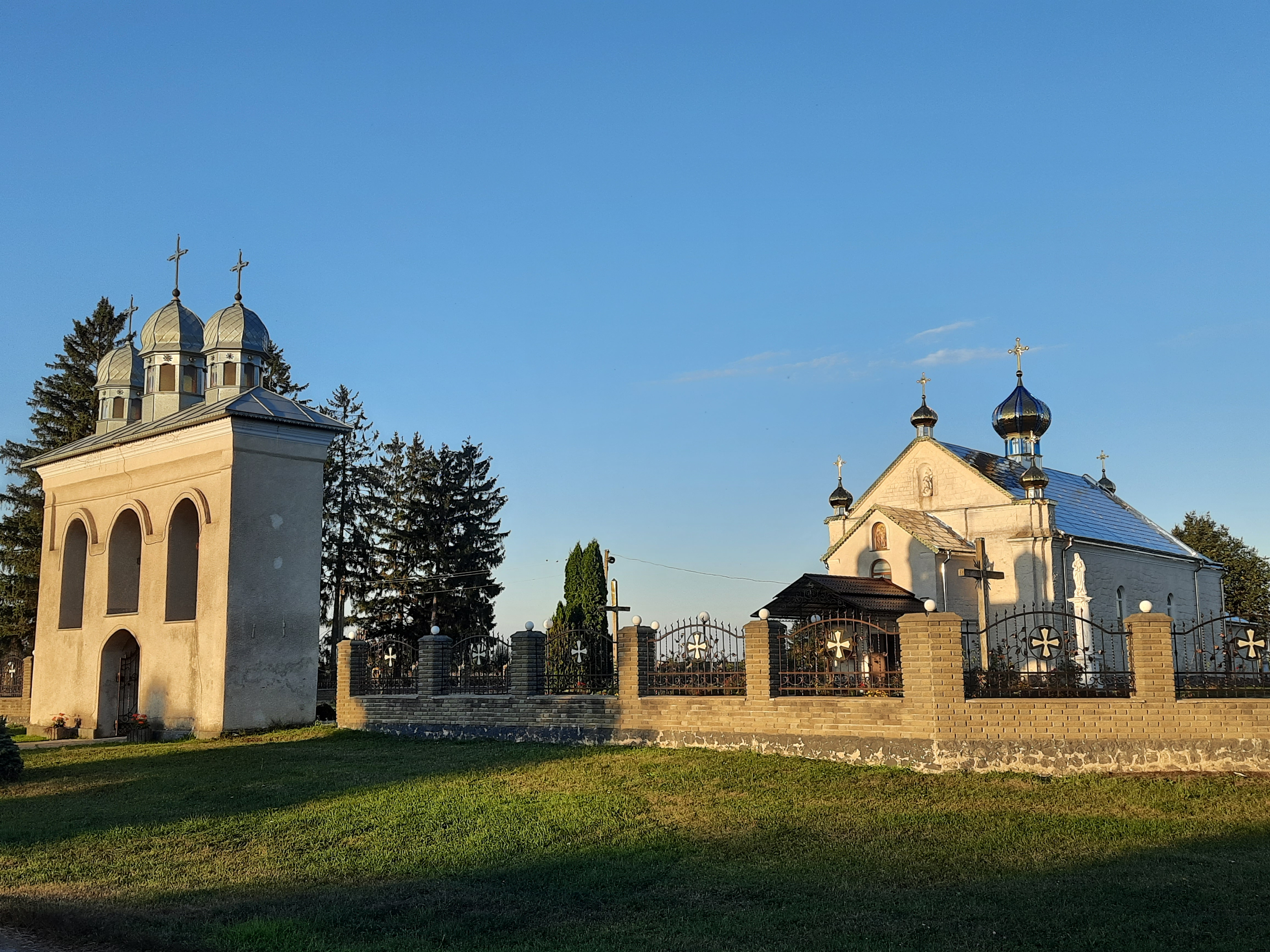
- Church of the Presentation of Mary in Kupchyntsi

- Location in Ternopil Oblast Kupchyntsi (Ukraine)
- Coordinates: 49°26′54″N 25°21′21″E
- Country: Ukraine
- Oblast: Ternopil Oblast
- Raion: Ternopil Raion
- Hromada: Kupchyntsi rural hromada
- Time zone: UTC+2 (EET)
  - Summer (DST): UTC+3 (EEST)
- Postal code: 47662

Kupchyntsi (Ukrainian: Kupchyntsi) is a village in Kupchyntsi rural hromada, Ternopil Raion, Ternopil Oblast, Ukraine.

== History ==
The first written mention dates back to 1312.

In the village there was also a castle built in the 17th century, which has not survived to this day.

After the liquidation of the Kozova Raion on 19 July 2020, the village became part of the Ternopil Raion.

== Religion ==
- Church of the Presentation of Mary (1899, stone, UGCC)

== Monuments ==
- Mass grave of the Fighters for the Freedom of Ukraine (1991)
- monuments to Ivan Franko (1970, sculpted by Ivan Honchar), soldiers from the same village who died in the German-Soviet war (1970), Pavlo Dumka (1994, sculptor Ivan Muliarchuk)
- memorial crosses in honor of the abolition of serfdom, the founding of the Brotherhood of Sobriety (1878)
- a garden to the fallen participants of Euromaidan (2014, "Garden of the Nebesna Sotnia")

== Notable residents ==
They were born in Kupchyntsi:

- Ivan Blazhkevych (1881–1945), Ukrainian teacher, cultural and educational activist
- Illia Blazhkevych (1894–1978), Ukrainian legal scholar
- Ilko Blazhkevych (1873–1943), Ukrainian conductor, singer, musician
- Oleksandr Vilchynskyi (b. 1963), Ukrainian writer, journalist
- Kateryna Danylchyk (b. 1949), Ukrainian teacher, public and political activist
- Hryhorii Dumka (1882–1951), Ukrainian agricultural scientist
- Pavlo Dumka (1854–1918), Ukrainian poet, publicist, ambassador (1908–1914) to the Galician Sejm, public figure
- Olha Zastavetska (1953–2017), Ukrainian geographer and teacher
- Bohdan Kachun (pseudonyms "Orel," "Borkun," etc.; 1912–1951), Ukrainian participant in the national liberation struggle
- Mykola Koval (1889–1982), Ukrainian teacher, amateur actor, director
- Mykola Kosar (pseudonym – Y. Chornobryvyi, cryptic – Y. C.; 1897–1945), Ukrainian amateur poet
- Mykhailo Kosar (1895–1972), Ukrainian public figure
- Vasyl Krysa (1904–1969), Ukrainian publicist, poet, cultural and public figure
- Mike Mazurki (|Mykhailo (Markiian) Mazurkevych; 1907–1990), American film actor and athlete
- Oleksa Oliinyk (1888–1971), Ukrainian military officer, lawyer, public and political figure
- Yaroslav Oliinyk (b. 1953), Ukrainian a scientist in the field of economic and social geography
- Yosyf Paratsii (pseudonym "Petryk"; 1900–1956), Ukrainian military officer, amateur actor and musician
- Bohdan Pastukh (1924–2009), Ukrainian literary critic, artist, teacher, public figure
- Ihor Pochynok (b. 1949), Ukrainian athlete, coach (biathlon, cross-country skiing)
- Boryslav (Borys) Skopivskyi (1931–2007), Ukrainian journalist, editor, writer, teacher, local historian, public figure
- Ivan Stadnyk (1888–1979), Ukrainian lawyer, publicist
- Mykola Stadnyk (1879–1947), Ukrainian lawyer, publicist, cultural and educational activist
- Mykhailo Tsybulko (b. 1949), Ukrainian artist, scholar, teacher
- Nestor Chornyi (b. 1922), Ukrainian teacher, engineer, local historian, publicist
- Mykhailo Shkilnyi (b. 1968), Ukrainian economist, public figure
- Illia Yakymyshyn (1891–1937), Ukrainian lawyer

Ivan Franko visited the village.

== In literature ==
In 2000, Volodymyr Khoma published a book about the village called "Starovynni Kupchyntsi".

== Sources ==
- (in Ukrainian) Гоцул В., Хома В., Купчинці // Ternopil Encyclopedic Dictionary: in 4 v. / editorial board: H. Yavorskyi and other, Ternopil: "Zbruch", 2005, V. 2: К—О, S. 285—286. — ISBN 966-528-199-2.
- "Kupczyńce, z przys. Józefówka, pow. tarnopolski". Geographical Dictionary of the Kingdom of Poland (in Polish). 4. Warszawa: Kasa im. Józefa Mianowskiego. 1883. p. 884.
