= Ihor Yeremeyev =

Ukrainian politician

- Ігор Єремеєв
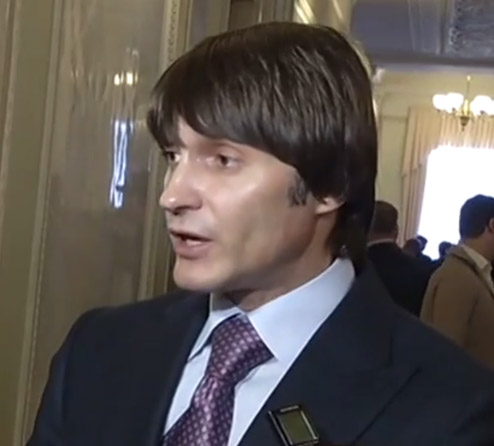
- Yeremeyev in February 2014

People's Deputy of Ukraine

4th convocation
- In office May 14, 2002 – February 4, 2005
- Constituency: Agrarian Party of Ukraine, Electoral district No.23

7th convocation
- In office December 12, 2012 – November 27, 2014
- Constituency: Independent, Electoral district No.23

8th convocation
- In office November 27, 2014 – August 12, 2015
- Constituency: Independent, Electoral district No.23

Personal details
- Born: Ihor Myronovych Yeremeyev; 3 April 1968 Ostrozhets, Mlyniv Raion, Rivne Oblast, Ukrainian SSR, Soviet Union
- Died: 12 August 2015 (aged 47) Zürich, Switzerland
- Party: Agrarian Party of Ukraine (2002–2005); Independent (2012–2015)
- Other political affiliations: People's Will
- Education: National University of Water Management, Rivne

Ihor Myronovych Yeremeyev (Ukrainian: Ігор Миронович Єремеєв, 3 April 1968 – 12 August 2015) was a Ukrainian politician, People's Deputy of Ukraine of the 4th, 7th and 8th convocation (non-partisan, Chairman of the Deputy Group "People's Will"). He was co-owner of the Ukrainian fuel station network WOG.

== Biography ==
He was born in 1968 in Ostrozhets, Mlyniv Raion, Rivne Oblast, Ukrainian SSR, Soviet Union.

In 1992, uniting the group of comrades from his institute, created a private enterprise "Continuum" in his native village and became its director.

In 2002, he was elected to the Verkhovna Rada after winning a single-member districts seat as a member of the Agrarian Party of Ukraine in Manevychi. In December 2010, he ranked 41st on the Kyiv Post's list of the richest people in Ukraine. In the 2012 Ukrainian parliamentary election and 2014 Ukrainian parliamentary election, he was elected back into parliament as a non-partisan candidate again after winning the single-member districts seat of Manevychi. He was the founder and head of the parliamentary group People's Will since its foundation on 27 February 2014 (until 27 November 2014 this group was called Sovereign European Ukraine).

In January 2014, during the voting for the so-called "dictatorial laws", his vote was counted as "for", but within a week he submitted an application with a request to consider the result of his vote "did not vote" and by participating in the preparation of a bill to repeal the said laws.

On 26 July 2015, he received a head injury during a horse-riding accident in Lutsk, Ukraine. He died on 12 August 2015 while in a coma in a hospital in Zürich, Switzerland afterwards. He was survived by wife Tetyana and his children, Sofia and Roman. In 2023 they were removed from the list of WOG shareholders and the trio claimed (in Forbes Ukraine) they had not been able to receive their inheritance.

== See also ==
- List of members of the Verkhovna Rada of Ukraine who died in office
