= Pavlo Dumka =

Ukrainian poet, publicist, public figure (1854–1918)

- Павло Андрійович Думка
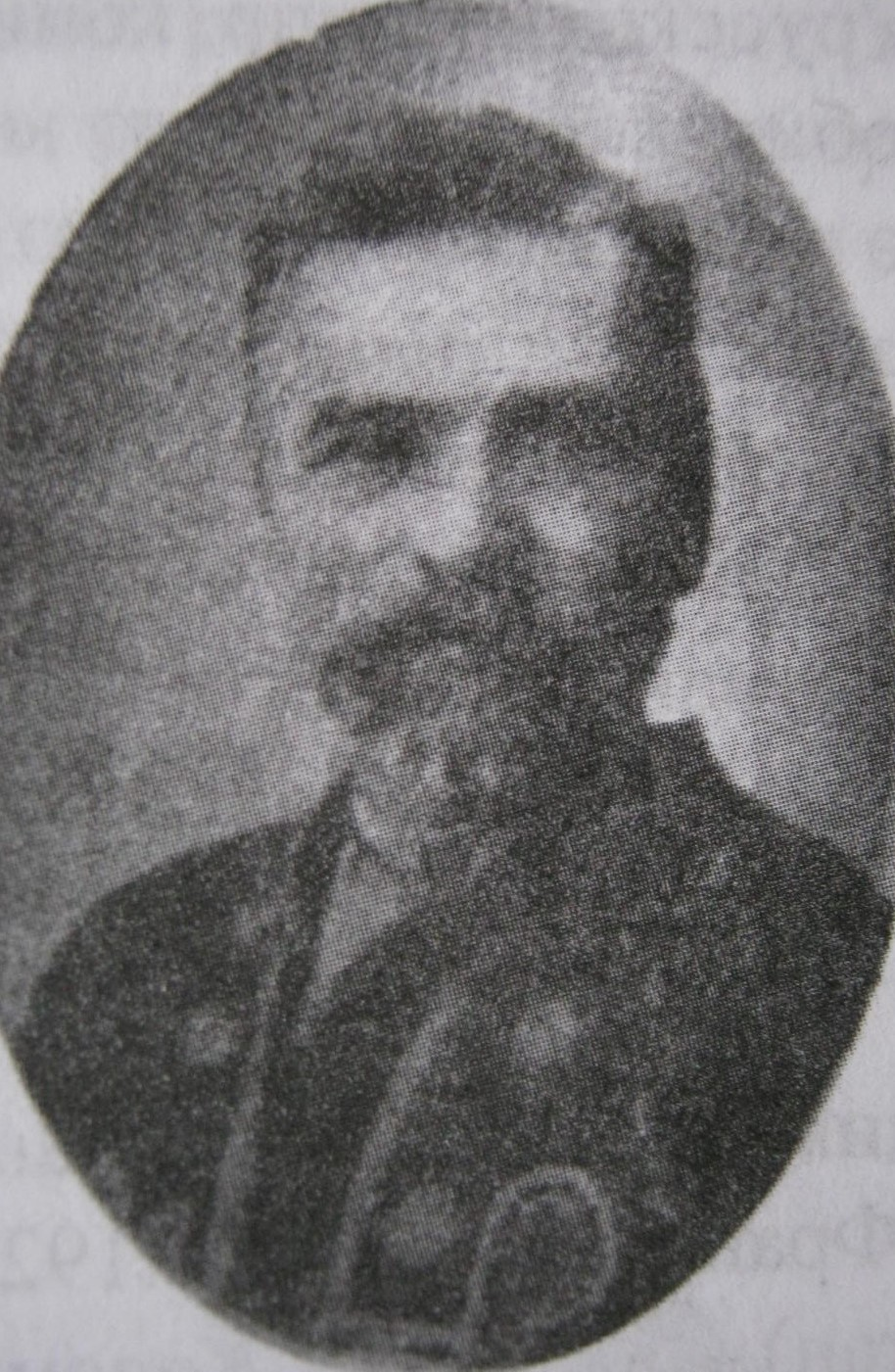
- Born: 21 March 1854; Kupchyntsi
- Died: 19 November 1918 (aged 64); Drahomanivka

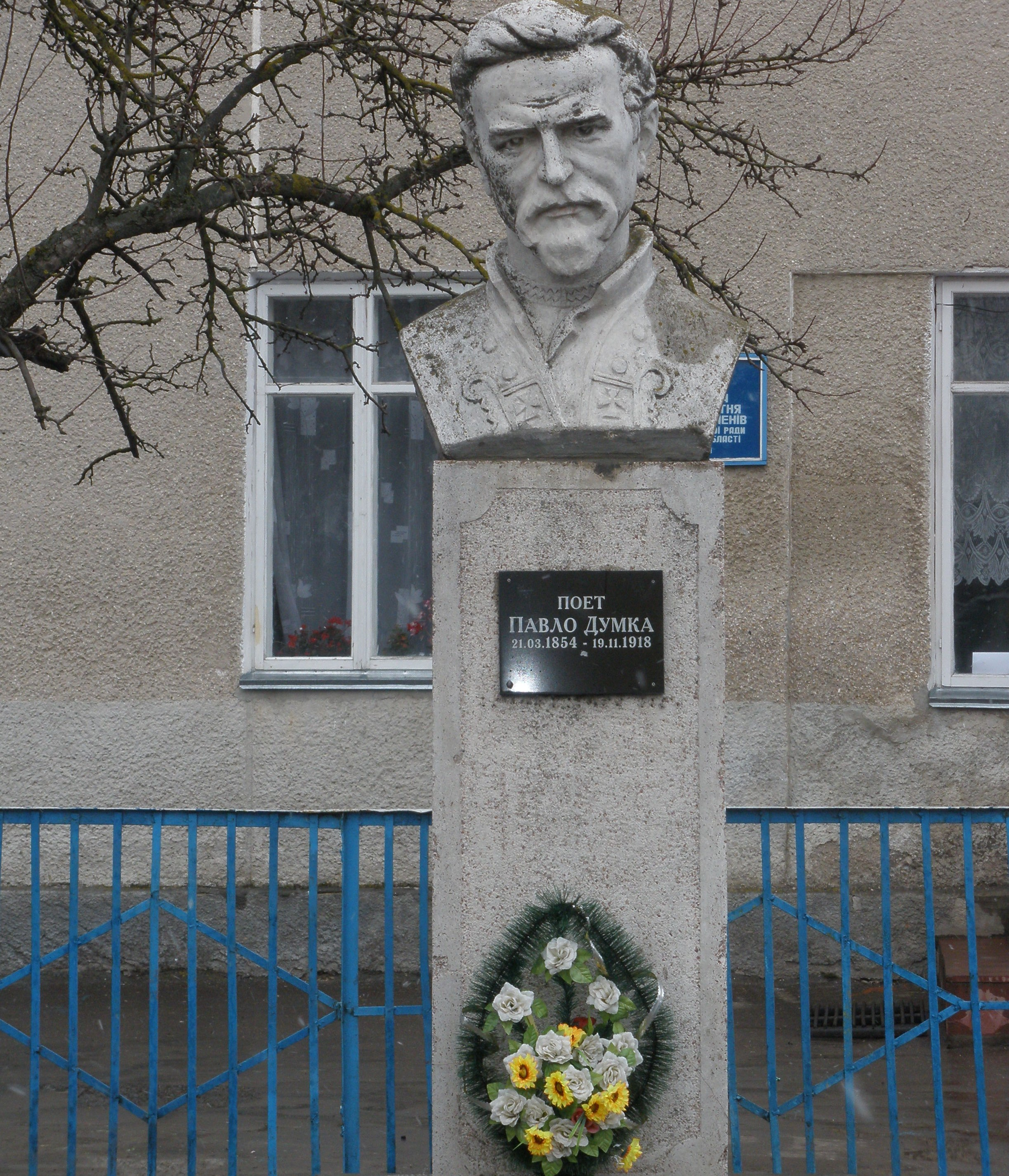
Bust of Pavlo Dumka in Kupchyntsi (1999, by sculptor Ivan Muliarchuk)

Pavlo Dumka (Ukrainian: Павло Андрійович Думка; 21 March 1854 – 19 November 1918) was a Ukrainian poet, publicist, public figure. Founding member of the Ukrainian Radical Party (1890), ambassador to the Galician Sejm (1908–1918), member of the Ukrainian National Council of the ZUNR (1918).

== Biography ==
Pavlo Dumka was born on 21 March 1854, in Kupchyntsi, now in the Ternopil Raion of the Ternopil Oblast.

Studied at a carving school in Lviv. In 1874, he organized the Prosvita reading room in his native village.

Died on 19 November 1918 in Drahomanivka, now Ternopil Raion, Ternopil Oblast.

== Works ==
In 1885 he made his debut as a poet. Dumka also contributed to the press on social and national-patriotic topics. Friended with Ivan Franko, Mykhailo Pavlyk, Vasyl Stefanyk, and Les Martovych.

Posthumously, Dumka's collections of poetry "Vesnianka" (1970) and journalism and poetry "Molytva rilnyka" (1994) were published.

== Sources ==
- (in Ukrainian) Савак Б., Хома, В., Думка Павло Андрійович // Ternopil Encyclopedic Dictionary: in 4 v. / editorial board: H. Yavorskyi and other, Ternopil: "Zbruch", 2004, V. 1: А—Й, S. 544—545. — ISBN 966-528-197-6.
