= Kupchyntsi rural hromada =

Rural hromada in Ternopil Oblast, Ukraine

Kupchyntsi rural hromada Купчинецька сільська громада
- hromada
- Location within Ternopil Oblast Location within Ukraine
- Coordinates: 49°26′54″N 25°21′21″E
- Country: Ukraine
- Oblast: Ternopil Oblast
- Raion: Ternopil Raion
- Administrative center: Kupchyntsi

Government
  - Hromada head: Ihor Krainskyi

Area
  - Total: 89.5 km^{2} (34.6 sq mi)

Population (2022)
  - Total: 3,759
- Villages: 8
- Website: kupchynecka-gromada.gov.ua

Kupchyntsi rural territorial hromada (Ukrainian: Купчинецька територіальна громада, romanized: Kupchynetska silska terytorialna hromada) is a hromada in Ukraine, in Ternopil Raion of Ternopil Oblast. The administrative center is the village of Kupchyntsi. Its population is 3,759 (2022 estimate) Created on 27 July 2018.

== Settlements ==
The hromada consists of 8 villages:

- Vesnivka
- Dvoryshche
- Denysiv
- Drahomanivka
- Ishkiv
- Kupchyntsi
- Rosokhuvatets
- Yastrubove
