= Denysiv =

Rural locality in Ternopil Oblast, Ukraine

Denysiv Денисів
- Location in Ternopil Oblast Denysiv (Ukraine)
- Coordinates: 49°27′36″N 25°20′15″E
- Country: Ukraine
- Oblast: Ternopil Oblast
- Raion: Ternopil Raion
- Hromada: Kupchyntsi Hromada
- Time zone: UTC+2 (EET)
  - Summer (DST): UTC+3 (EEST)
- Postal code: 47651

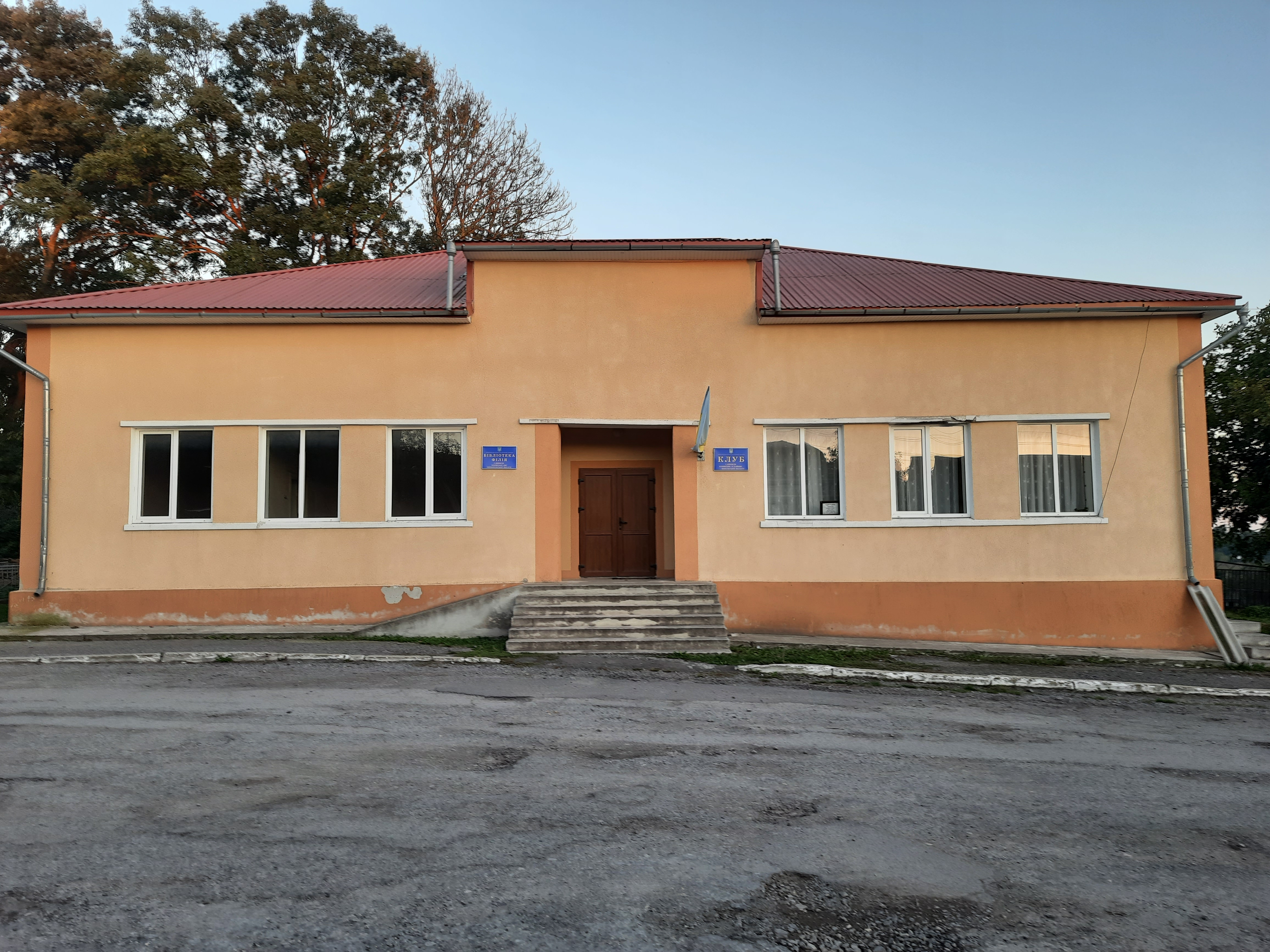
Denisiv Village Club Ternopil District, Ternopil Region

Denysiv (Ukrainian: Денисів) is a village in Kupchyntsi rural hromada, Ternopil Raion, Ternopil Oblast, Ukraine.

== History ==
The first mention of the village was recorded in the second half of the XVI century.

After the liquidation of the Kozova Raion on 19 July 2020, the village became part of the Ternopil Raion.

== Religion ==
- Saint Nicholas Church (1887; architect Rotter, painted in 1889-1890 by Kornylo Ustiyanovych; restored in 1990)

== Notable residents ==
- Ivanna Blazhkevych (1886–1977), Ukrainian writer, educator, publicist, ethnographer, folklorist, and public figure
- Anthony Hlynka (1907–1957), Canadian journalist, publisher, immigration activist and politician of Ukrainian descend
- Isydore Hlynka (1909–1983), Canadian biochemist, and Ukrainian Canadian community leader
- Illia Kuziv (1874–1916), Ukrainian Greek Catholic priest, writer, translator, publicist, and folklorist
- Volodymyr Khoma (1930–2005), Ukrainian educator, local historian, literary critic, folklorist, writer
- Bohdan Savak (born 1948), Ukrainian local historian, literary critic, and public figure

The village was home to the conductor Fr. Yosyp Vitoshynskyi, and was also home to writers Tymotei Borduliak, Iryna Vilde, Volodymyr Hzhytskyi, Volodymyr Hnatiuk, Olha Duchymynska, Bohdan Lepkyi, Osyp Makovei, Mykhailo Pavlyk, Vasyl Stefanyk, Ivan Franko, Andrii Chaikovskyi, Czech ethnographer and folklorist František Řehoř (1897), and other famous figures.
