= Levkiv =

Levkiv (Ukrainian: Левків) is a Ukrainian surname. Notable people with the surname include:

- Bohdan Levkiv (1950–2021), Ukrainian politician
- Taras Levkiv (1940–2025), Ukrainian artist, specialised in ceramic art
