= Ternopil =

City and administrative center of Ternopil Oblast, Ukraine

Ternopil Тернопіль
- City
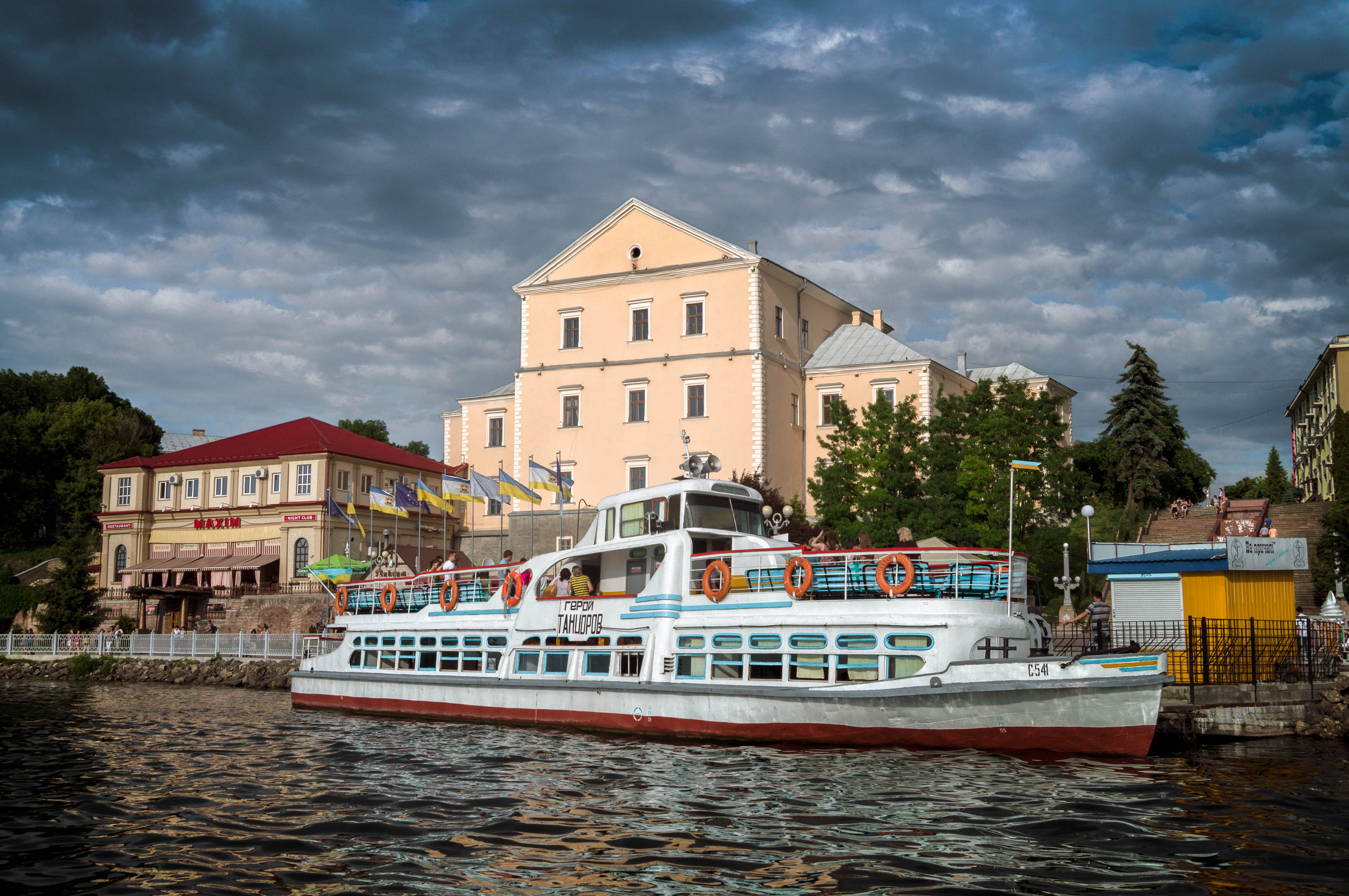
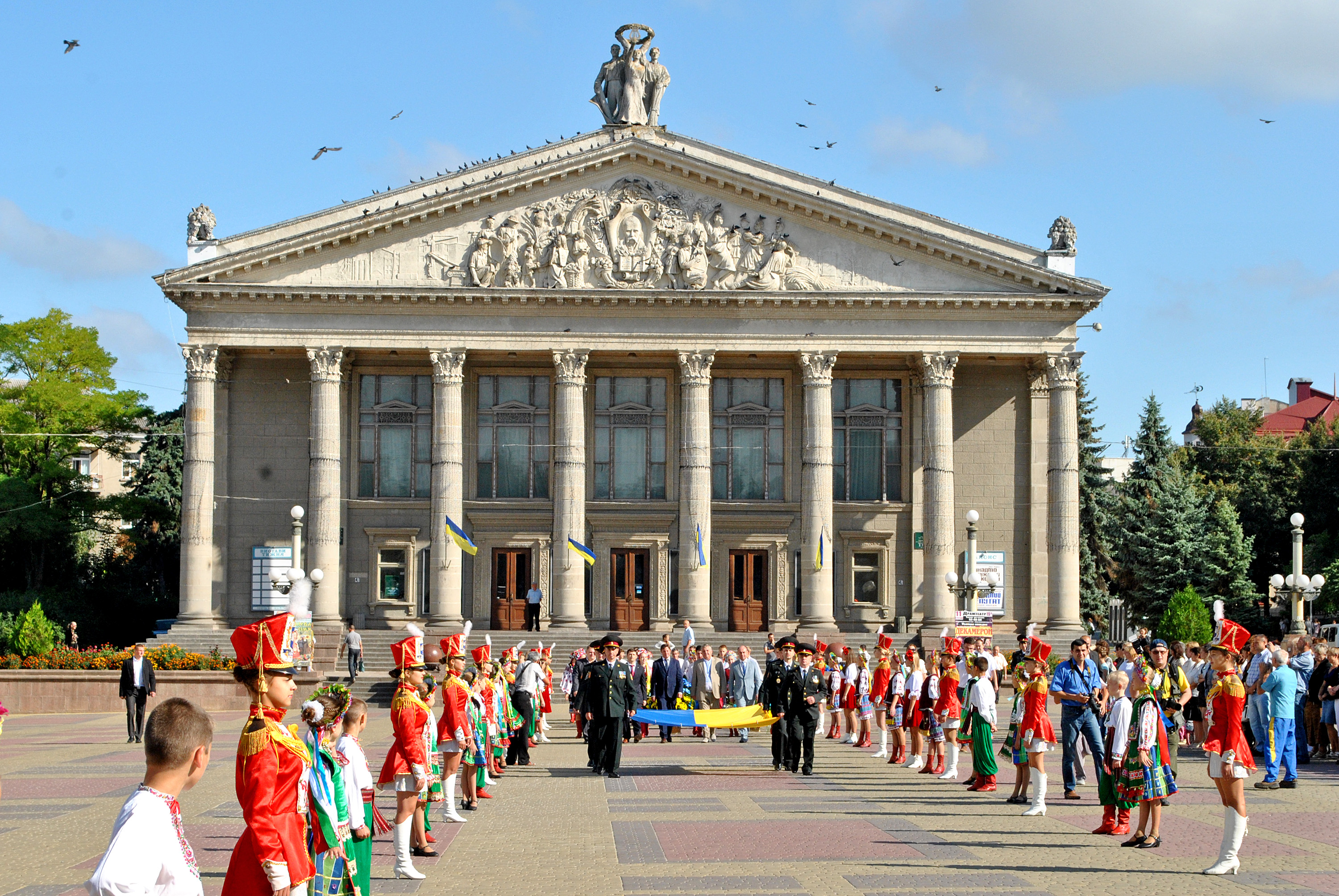
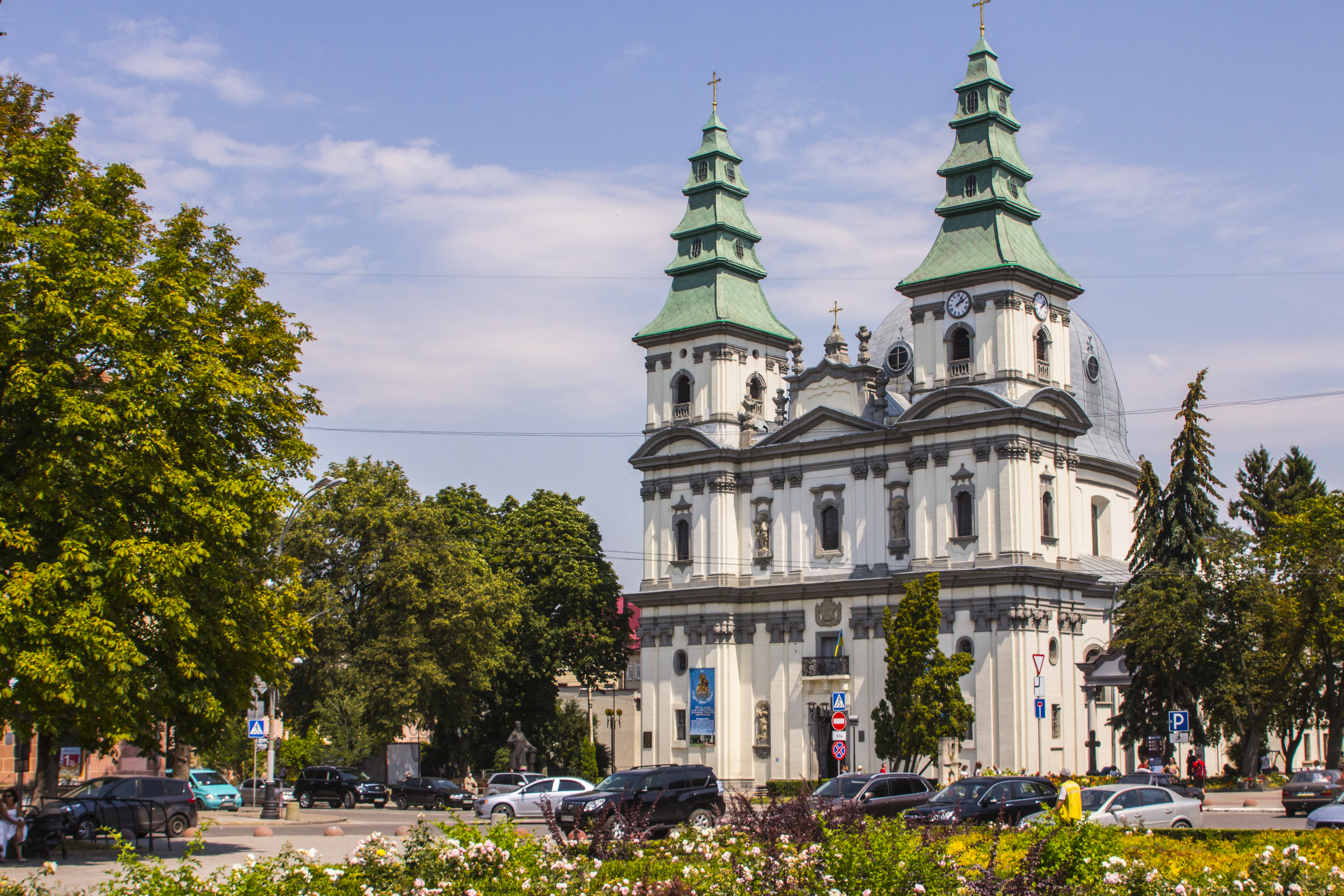
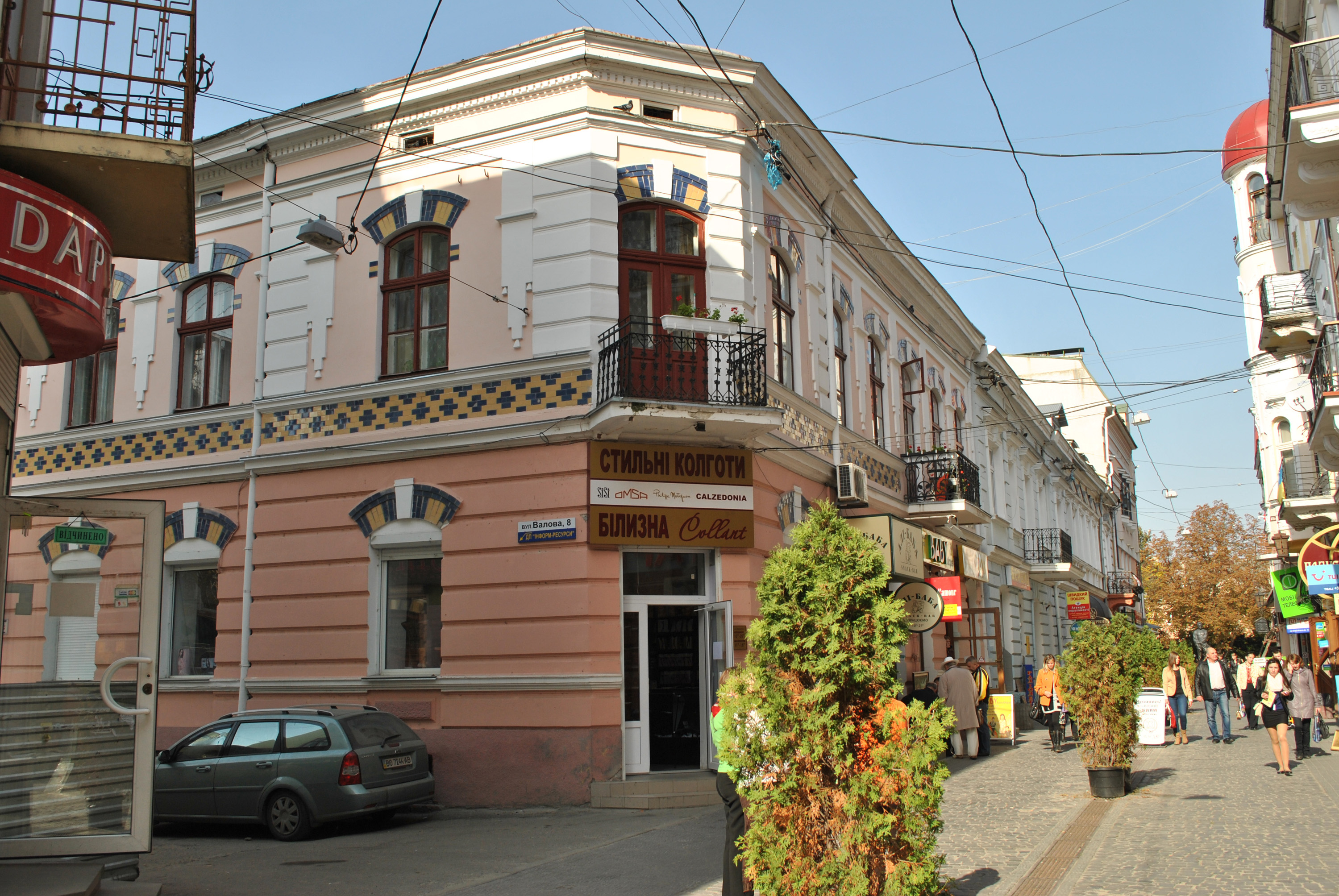
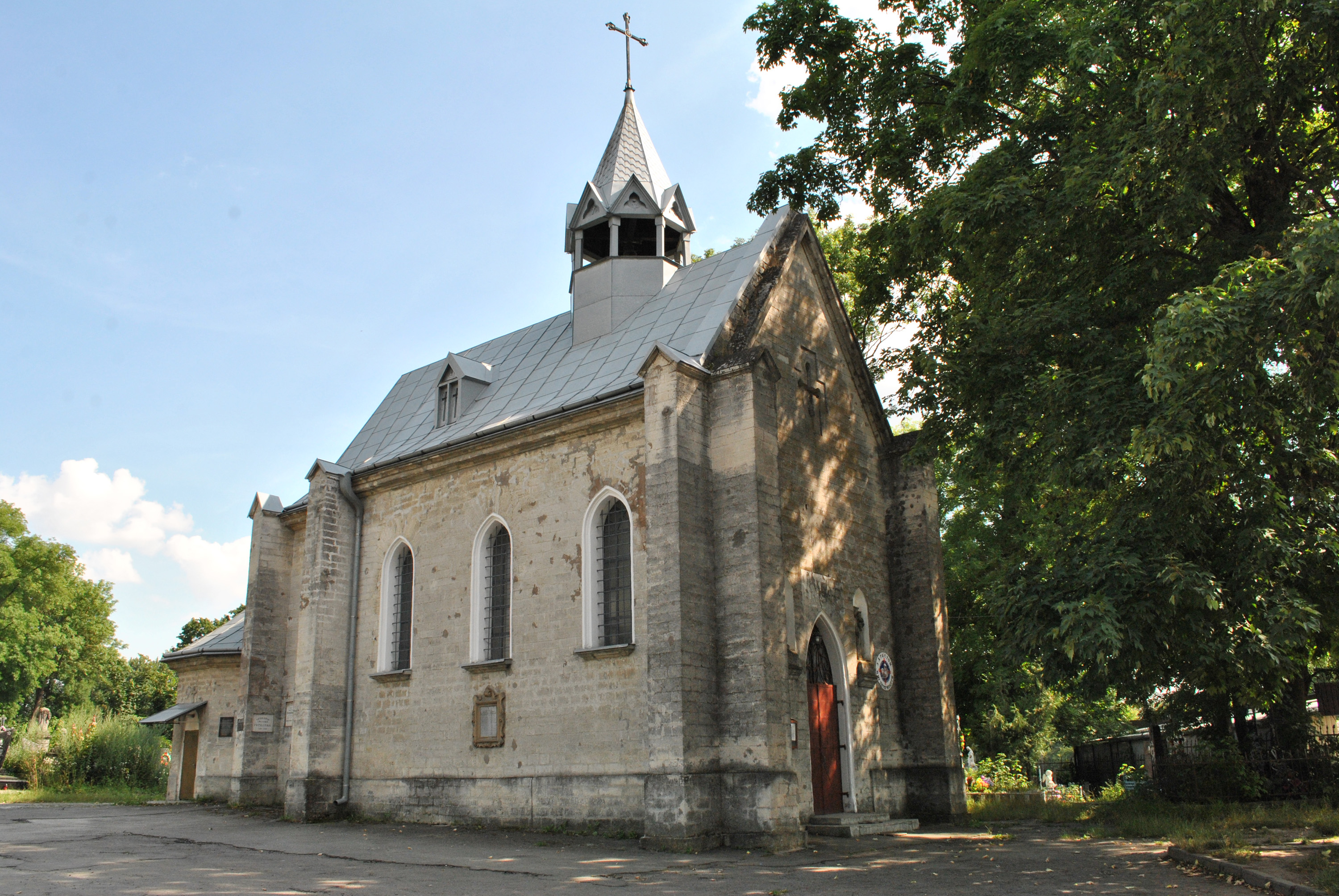
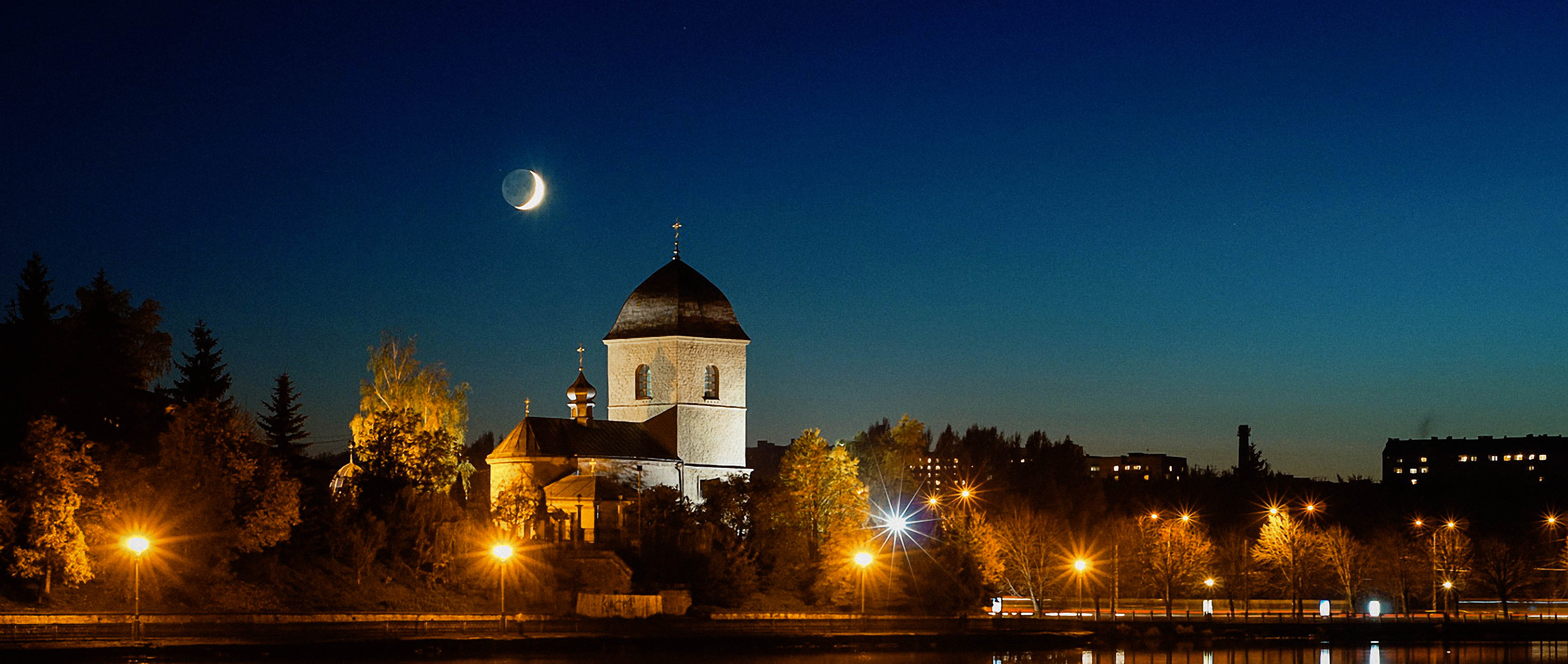
- Ternopil Castle seen from the lake Theatre Square Cathedral of the Immaculate Conception Valova Street Chapel in Mykulyntsi Cemetery Church of the Exaltation of Holy Cross

- Flag Coat of arms Brandmark
- Interactive map of Ternopil
- Location within Ukraine Ternopil (Ternopil Oblast)
- Coordinates: 49°34′N 25°36′E
- Country: Ukraine
- Oblast: Ternopil Oblast
- Raion: Ternopil Raion
- Hromada: Ternopil urban hromada
- Founded: 1540 (486 years ago)

Government
  - Mayor: Serhiy Nadal (Svoboda)

Area
  - Total: 86 km^{2} (33 sq mi)
- Elevation (mean): 320 m (1,050 ft)

Population (2022)
  - Total: 225,004
  - Density: 2,600/km^{2} (6,800/sq mi)
- Time zone: UTC+2 (CET)
  - Summer (DST): UTC+3 (CEST)
- Area code: +380 352
- Website: rada.te.ua/en

Ternopil, (Note: Ukrainian: Тернопіль, IPA: [terˈnɔpilʲ]; Polish: Tarnopol; Yiddish: טארנאפאל, romanized: Tarnapol; Hebrew: טרנופול, romanized: Tarnopol; German: Tannstadt.) known until 1944 mostly as Tarnopol, is a city in western Ukraine, located on the banks of the Seret River. Ternopil is one of the major cities of Western Ukraine and the historical regions of Galicia and Podolia. The population of Ternopil was estimated at 225,004 (2022 estimate).

Founded as a border fortress of the Kingdom of Poland, the city remained property of several noble families and became an important centre of trade, but suffered from numerous attacks by Turks, Tatars and Zaporozhian Cossacks. After a period of decline, it saw a new period of development in the 19th century thanks to its role as a transit location between the Austrian monarchy and Russian Empire. During the early 20th century Ternopil was the only city in Galicia where Ukrainians were more numerous than Poles. During and immediately after World War I the city experienced periods of Russian, Ukrainian and Soviet rule, before being incorporated by Interwar Poland. During the Second World War Ternopil was occupied by Soviet and German troops and suffered severe damage. In the aftermath of the war, it was incorporated into the Ukrainian Soviet Socialist Republic, a member republic of the USSR. Since 1991 Ternopil has been part of independent Ukraine.

The city is the administrative center of Ternopil Oblast (region), as well as of surrounding Ternopil Raion (district) within the oblast. It hosts the administration of Ternopil urban hromada, one of the hromadas of Ukraine.

== History ==
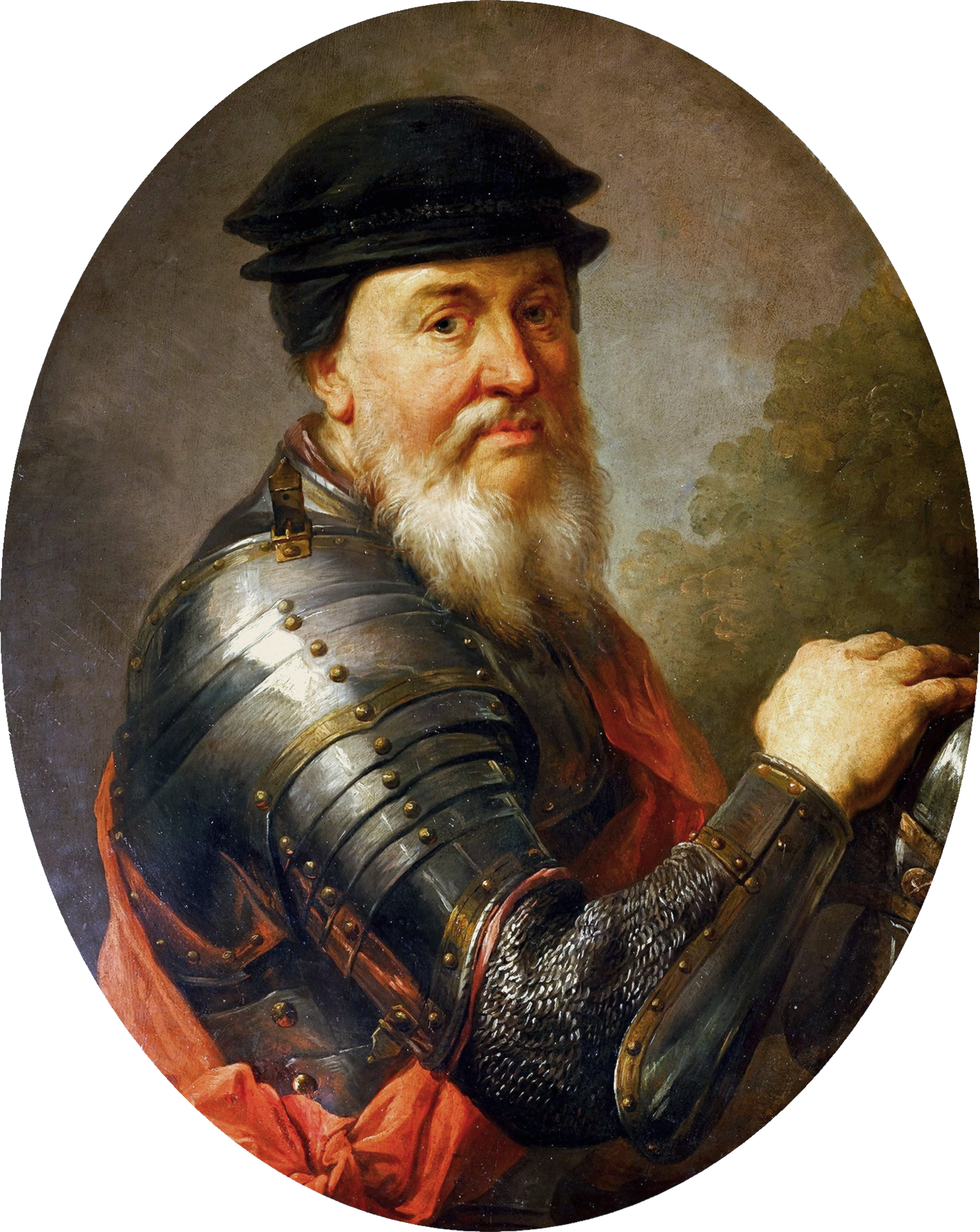
Jan Amor Tarnowski, founder of Tarnopol

The city was founded in 1540 by Polish commander and Hetman Jan Amor Tarnowski. Its Polish name, Tarnopol, means 'Tarnowski's city' and stems from a combination of the founder's family name and the Greek term polis. The city served as a military stronghold and castle protecting the eastern borders of Polish Kingdom from Tatar raids. On 15 April 1540, the King of Poland, Sigismund I the Old, in Kraków gave Tarnowski permission to establish Tarnopol, near Sopilcze (Sopilche). In 1570, the city passed to the Ostrogski family, and in 1623 to the Zamoyski family. During the Khmelnytsky Uprising, many residents of the city joined the ranks of the Cossack forces. During the 1672–1676 Polish–Ottoman War, Tarnopol was almost completely destroyed by Turkish forces of Ibrahim Shishman Pasha in 1675, then rebuilt by Aleksander Koniecpolski.

A period of decline followed, during which the city suffered from the rebellion of Bar Confederation, and in 1770 its population was significantly reduced by a cholera epidemic. In 1772, after the First Partition of Poland, the city came under Austrian rule. In 1809, after the War of the Fifth Coalition, the city came under Russian rule, incorporated into the newly created Ternopol krai, but in 1815 returned to Austrian rule in accordance with the Congress of Vienna. In 1870 Tarnopol was connected by railway with Lemberg and Pidvolochysk. During the late 19th and early 20th century it was the only urban locality in Galicia, where ethnic Ukrainians formed a majority compared to Poles. In 1898 a Ukrainian language gymnasium was opened in the city. Among notable representatives of the Ukrainian national movement active in Ternopil during that period were Oleksander Barvinsky and Volodymyr Luchakivskyi.

During World War I, the city passed from German and Austro-Hungarian forces to Russia several times. In 1916 a Ukrainian theatre and a number of schools teaching in the Ukrainian language were opened. In 1917 the city and its castle were burned down by fleeing Russian forces. After the dissolution of the Austro-Hungarian Empire, Ternopil was proclaimed part of the West Ukrainian People's Republic on 11 November 1918. After Polish forces captured Lwów during the Polish-Ukrainian War, Tarnopol became the country's temporary capital. After the Act of Union between the West Ukrainian Republic and the Ukrainian People's Republic, Ternopil formally became part of the UPR. On 15 July 1919, the city was captured by Polish forces. In July and August 1920, the Red Army captured Ternopil in the course of the Polish-Soviet War, and the city served as the capital of the short-lived Galician Soviet Socialist Republic. Under the terms of the Riga treaty, the area remained under Polish control.

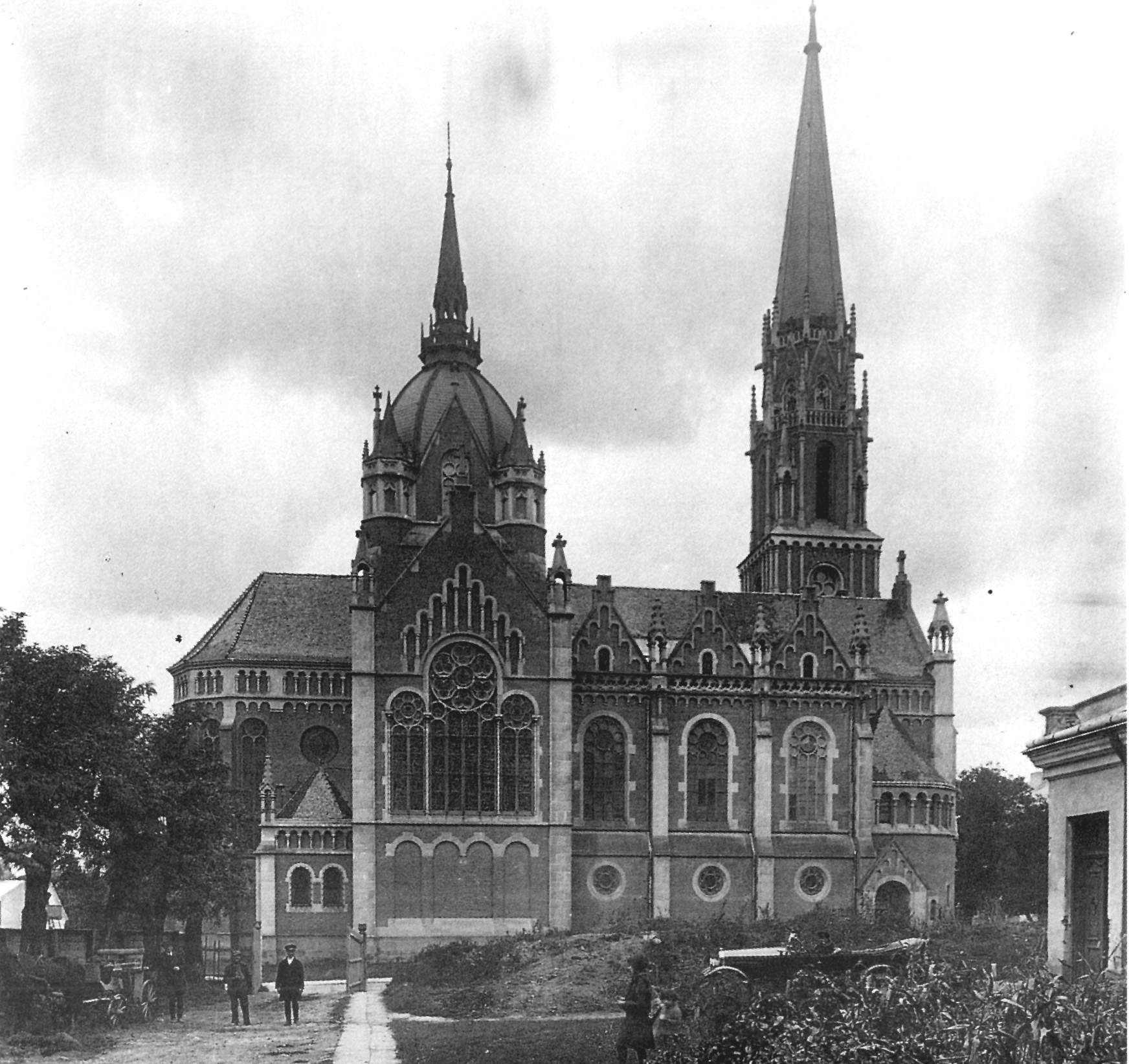
The Church of St. Mary of the Perpetual Assistance was demolished after World War II.

During the Interwar period the city served as the capital of Tarnopol Voivodeship, but its economic importance declined due to the closure of the nearby eastern border. In 1930 the local Ukrainian gymnasium was closed as part of government-promoted campaigns of Polonization and Pacification. Despite this, Ternopil continued to serve as a centre of Ukrainian culture, education, religion and sports.

Following the start of World War II, on 17 September 1939 Red Army troops entered Ternopil, followed by NKVD troops one day later. Some local Poles, including gendarmerie servicemen, resisted against the invading forces, throwing grenades and shooting at them from house windows. As a consequence of the Soviet invasion of Poland, Ternopil was incorporated into the Ukrainian Soviet Socialist Republic as part of Ternopol Oblast.

On 2 July 1941, the city was occupied by the Nazis following mass executions of imprisoned locals by Soviet authorities. Between then and July 1943, 10,000 Jews were killed by Nazi Germans with the help of Ukrainian militia, and another 6,000 were rounded up and sent to Belzec extermination camp. A few hundred others went to labor camps. During most of this time Jews lived in the Tarnopol Ghetto. Many Ukrainians were sent as forced labour to Germany. Following the act of restoration of the Ukrainian state, proclaimed by the Organization of Ukrainian Nationalists in Lviv on 30 June 1941, the Ukrainian Insurgent Army (UPA) was active in the Ternopil region and battled for the independence of Ukraine, opposing the Polish underground Armia Krajowa and People's Army of Poland as well as the Nazis and the Soviets. In 1942 the Germans operated the Stalag 323 prisoner-of-war camp for French POWs in the city. During the Soviet offensive in March and April 1944, the city was almost completely destroyed by Soviet artillery, losing over half of its buildings. It was occupied by the Red Army on 15 April 1944. After the second Soviet occupation, 85% of the city's living quarters were destroyed.

Following the Potsdam Conference in 1945, Poland's borders were redrawn and Ternopil was incorporated into the Ukrainian SSR of the Soviet Union. The ethnic Polish population of the area was forcibly deported to postwar Poland. In 1953 a plan of the city's reconstruction was approved, and in the following decades Ternopil was rebuilt in a typical Soviet style, with only a few pre-war buildings being restored. Under the Soviet rule Ternopil became an important industrial centre specializing in food production, as well as light industry, manufacturing of construction materials, electronics, machine-building etc.

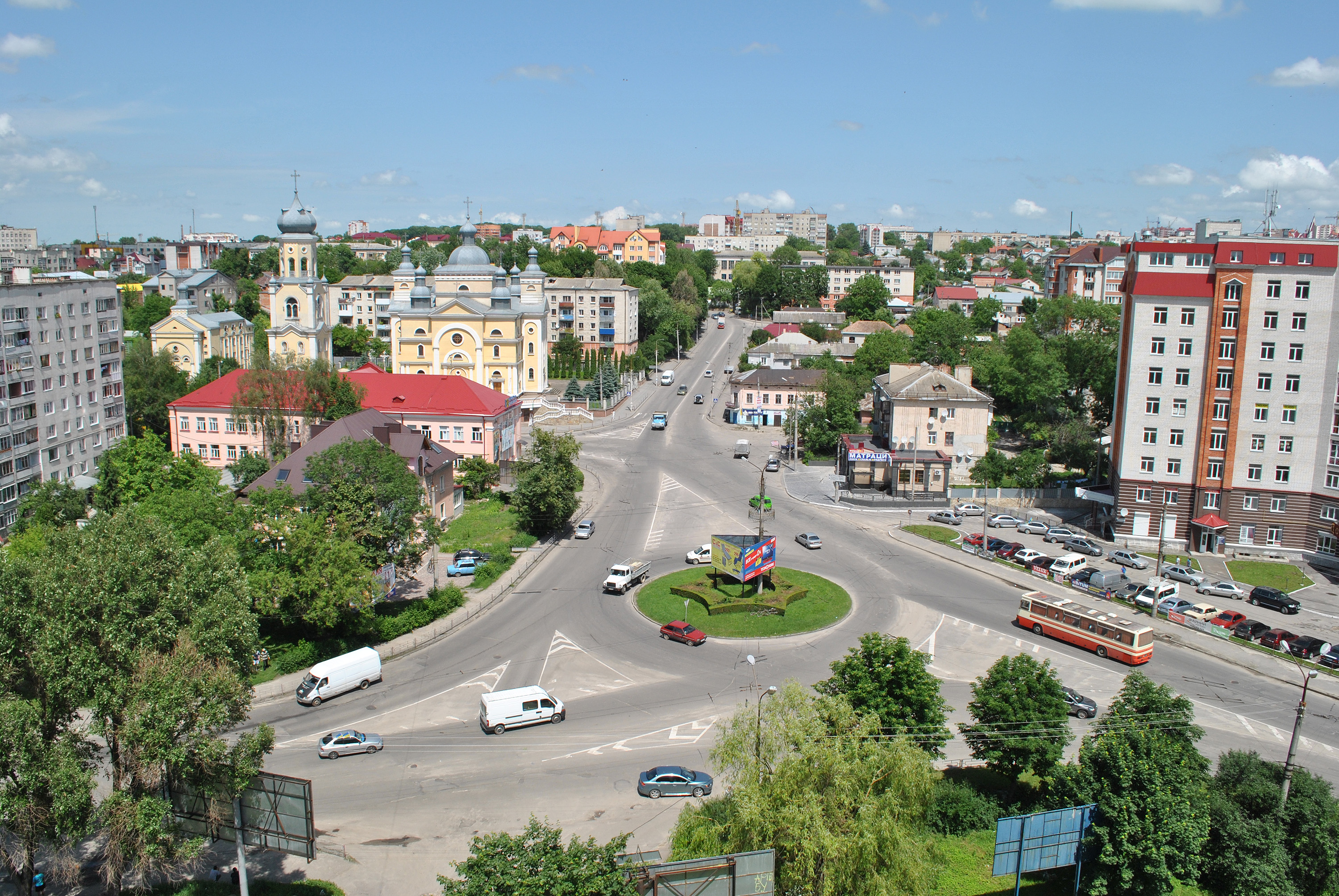
Modern view of Ternopil

Following the fall of the Soviet Union, Ternopil became part of independent Ukraine, as a city of regional significance. On 31 December 2013, the 11th Artillery Brigade, the descendant of artillery units that had been based in the city since 1949, was disbanded. In 2020, as part of the administrative reform in Ukraine, which reduced the number of raions of Ternopil Oblast to three, the city was merged into Ternopil Raion.

During the Russo-Ukrainian War, Ternopil was struck by Russian missiles on 13 May 2023, minutes before Ternopil natives Tvorchi performed at the Eurovision Song Contest 2023. On 19 November 2025 another Russian strike hit a residential area, killing at least 34 people, including 3 children, and injuring 66.

== Geography ==
=== Climate ===
Ternopil has a moderate continental climate with cold winters and warm summers.

Climate data for Ternopil (1991–2020, extremes 1949–present)
Month	Jan	Feb	Mar	Apr	May	Jun	Jul	Aug	Sep	Oct	Nov	Dec	Year
Record high °C (°F)	13.9 (57.0)	17.3 (63.1)	25.0 (77.0)	30.0 (86.0)	30.2 (86.4)	37.8 (100.0)	38.4 (101.1)	36.1 (97.0)	32.1 (89.8)	25.7 (78.3)	19.9 (67.8)	13.9 (57.0)	38.4 (101.1)
Mean daily maximum °C (°F)	−1.1 (30.0)	0.6 (33.1)	5.9 (42.6)	14.0 (57.2)	19.6 (67.3)	22.6 (72.7)	24.7 (76.5)	24.5 (76.1)	19.0 (66.2)	12.6 (54.7)	5.5 (41.9)	0.3 (32.5)	12.4 (54.3)
Daily mean °C (°F)	−3.6 (25.5)	−2.4 (27.7)	1.9 (35.4)	8.7 (47.7)	14.2 (57.6)	17.5 (63.5)	19.2 (66.6)	18.7 (65.7)	13.5 (56.3)	8.0 (46.4)	2.6 (36.7)	−2.2 (28.0)	8.0 (46.4)
Mean daily minimum °C (°F)	−6.1 (21.0)	−5.2 (22.6)	−1.6 (29.1)	3.8 (38.8)	8.9 (48.0)	12.3 (54.1)	13.9 (57.0)	13.1 (55.6)	8.7 (47.7)	4.2 (39.6)	0.0 (32.0)	−4.6 (23.7)	4.0 (39.2)
Record low °C (°F)	−31.6 (−24.9)	−31.0 (−23.8)	−23.9 (−11.0)	−6.1 (21.0)	−2.2 (28.0)	−1.7 (28.9)	4.0 (39.2)	3.6 (38.5)	−4.0 (24.8)	−10.5 (13.1)	−18.0 (−0.4)	−27.0 (−16.6)	−31.6 (−24.9)
Average precipitation mm (inches)	28 (1.1)	30 (1.2)	34 (1.3)	37 (1.5)	64 (2.5)	75 (3.0)	84 (3.3)	62 (2.4)	57 (2.2)	39 (1.5)	34 (1.3)	35 (1.4)	579 (22.8)
Average precipitation days (≥ 1.0 mm)	7.9	7.9	7.9	7.6	9.7	9.6	9.8	7.7	7.4	7.3	7.2	8.9	98.9
Average relative humidity (%)	85.7	83.5	77.7	68.8	69.1	72.2	72.8	71.7	76.2	80.5	86.6	87.0	77.7
Source 1: NOAA
Source 2: Climatebase.ru (extremes)

== Demographics ==
=== Historical population ===
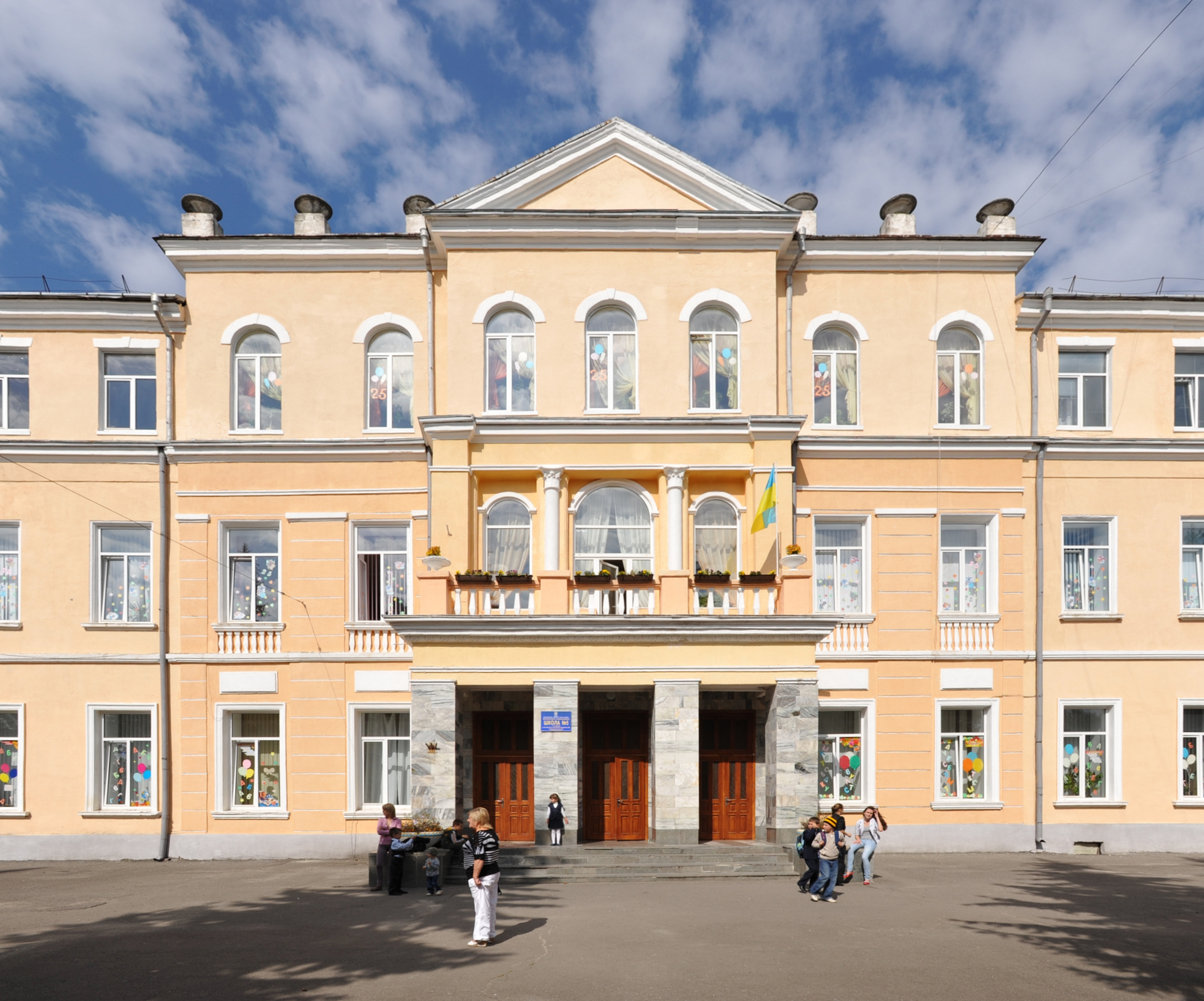
School No. 5 (former girls' school of St. Jadwiga) in Ternopil

Historical population
Year	Pop.	±%
1672	2,400	—
1770	5,000	+108.3%
1772	3,000	−40.0%
1817	10,200	+240.0%
1869	20,100	+97.1%
1900	30,415	+51.3%
1914	35,200	+15.7%
1921	32,000	−9.1%
1931	35,600	+11.3%
1939	37,500	+5.3%
1946	12,000	−68.0%
1950	26,000	+116.7%
1959	52,245	+100.9%
1970	84,663	+62.0%
1979	143,625	+69.6%
1989	204,845	+42.6%
2001	227,755	+11.2%
2011	217,446	−4.5%
2022	225,004	+3.5%

According to the 2001 Ukrainian census, Ternopil city and Ternopil Oblast are homogeneously populated by ethnic Ukrainians. Both Ternopil city and Ternopil Oblast are also homogeneously Ukrainian-speaking.

Starting from the city's foundation and until the 20th century its demographics were dominated by Ukrainians, Poles and Jews. In 1900 44.3% of Ternopil's population belonged to Jewish religion, with most of the rest being Ukrainians and Poles. By 1939 the Jewish population had declined to 39.3%, the number of Poles had risen to 39.7% and Ukrainians comprised 19.2% of the population.

The city's population underwent a radical change following the establishment of the Soviet regime, and by 1959 78% of its inhabitants were Ukrainians, 15% - Russians, meanwhile the share of Poles had declined to 5%.

=== Modern situation ===
National breakdown of Ternopil Oblast (total population 1,138,500):

- Ukrainians: 1,113,500 (97.8%)
- Russians: 14,250 (1.2%)
- Poles: 3,800 (0.3%)

Native languages in Ternopil:

- Ukrainian language: 94.8%
- Russian language: 3.37%
- Belarusian language: 0.07%
- Polish language: 0.04%

According to a survey conducted by the International Republican Institute in 2023, 98% of the city's population spoke Ukrainian at home and 1% spoke Russian.

== Economy ==
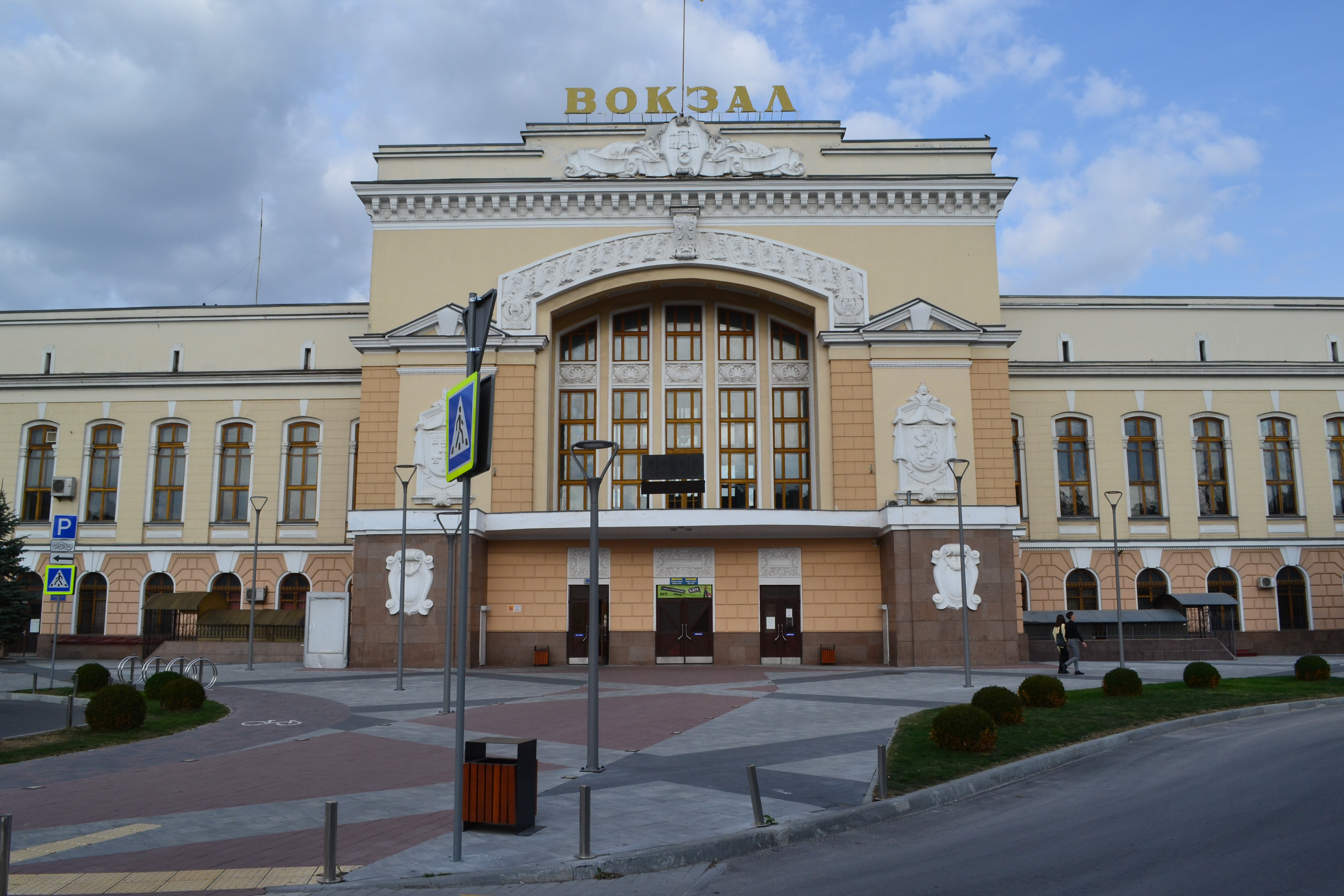
Ternopil railway station

Ternopil is a centre for the light industry, food industry, radio-electronic and construction industries. In the Soviet and early post-Soviet period, a harvester plant and a porcelain factory operated in the city.

== Transport ==
Ternopil is an important railway hub with connections to most major railway stations of Ukraine. The city lies on the M12 international highway connecting western and central regions of Ukraine. Trolleybus lines and a bus station are active in the city. Water transport operates on Ternopil artificial lake mostly for tourist purposes. An airport was opened for civilian traffic in 1985, but ceased commercial operations in 2010.

== Higher education ==
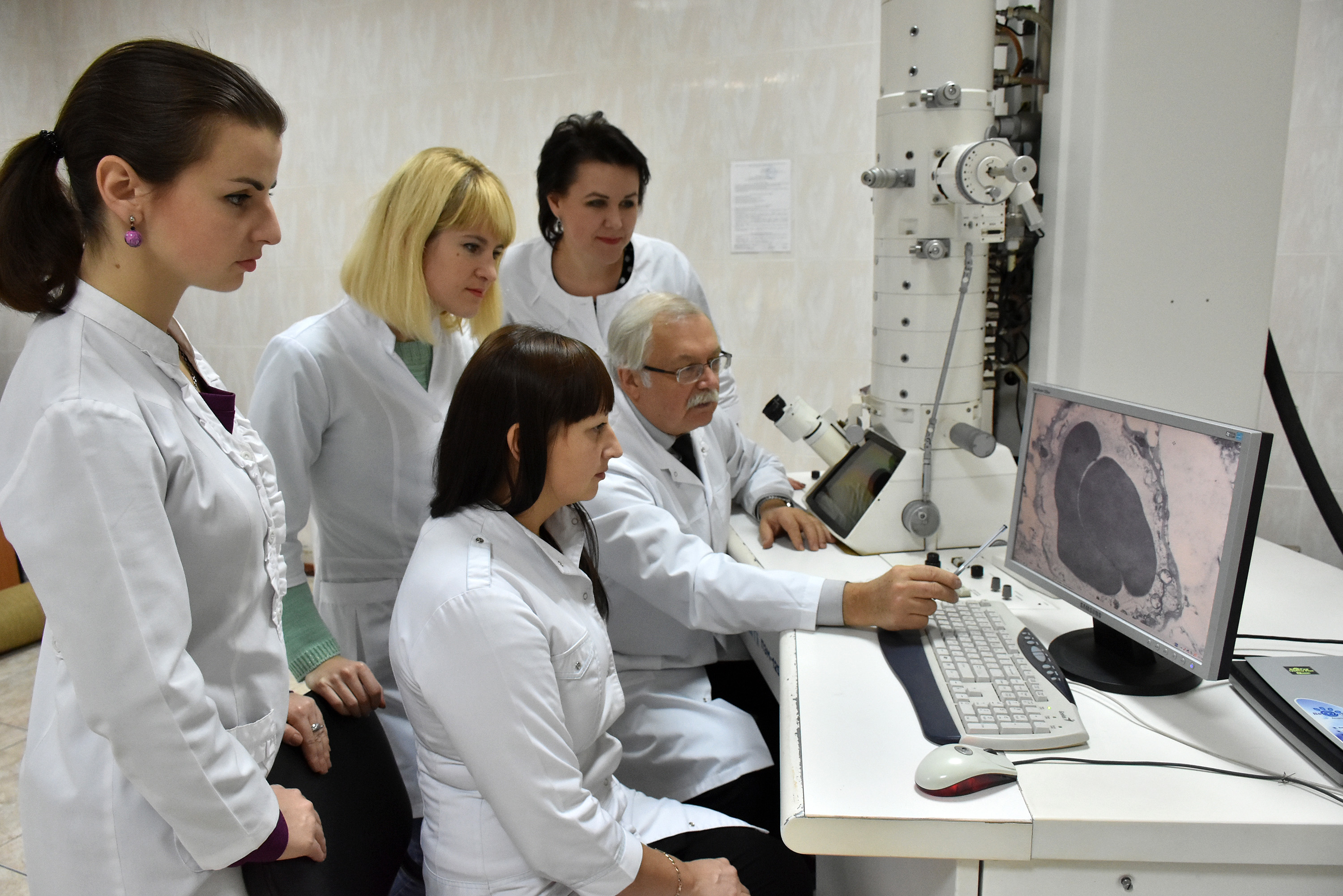
Teachers of Ternopil State Medical University.

Universities include:

- West Ukrainian National University
- Ternopil Ivan Pul'uj National Technical University
- Ternopil Volodymyr Hnatyuk National Pedagogical University
- Ternopil State Medical University

== Main sights ==
- Ternopil Regional Art Museum
- Ternopil Drama Theater
- Church of the Exaltation of the Cross, Ternopil
- Ukrainian Greek Catholic Cathedral of the Immaculate Conception of The Blessed Virgin Mary
- The sanctuary of Our Lady of Zarvanytsia with a miraculous icon of the 13th century called icon of the Mother of God of Zarvanytsia, sanctuary of Greek-Catholic rite. Located about 40 km from Ternopil, celebrated on 22 July.
Ternopil Drama Theater

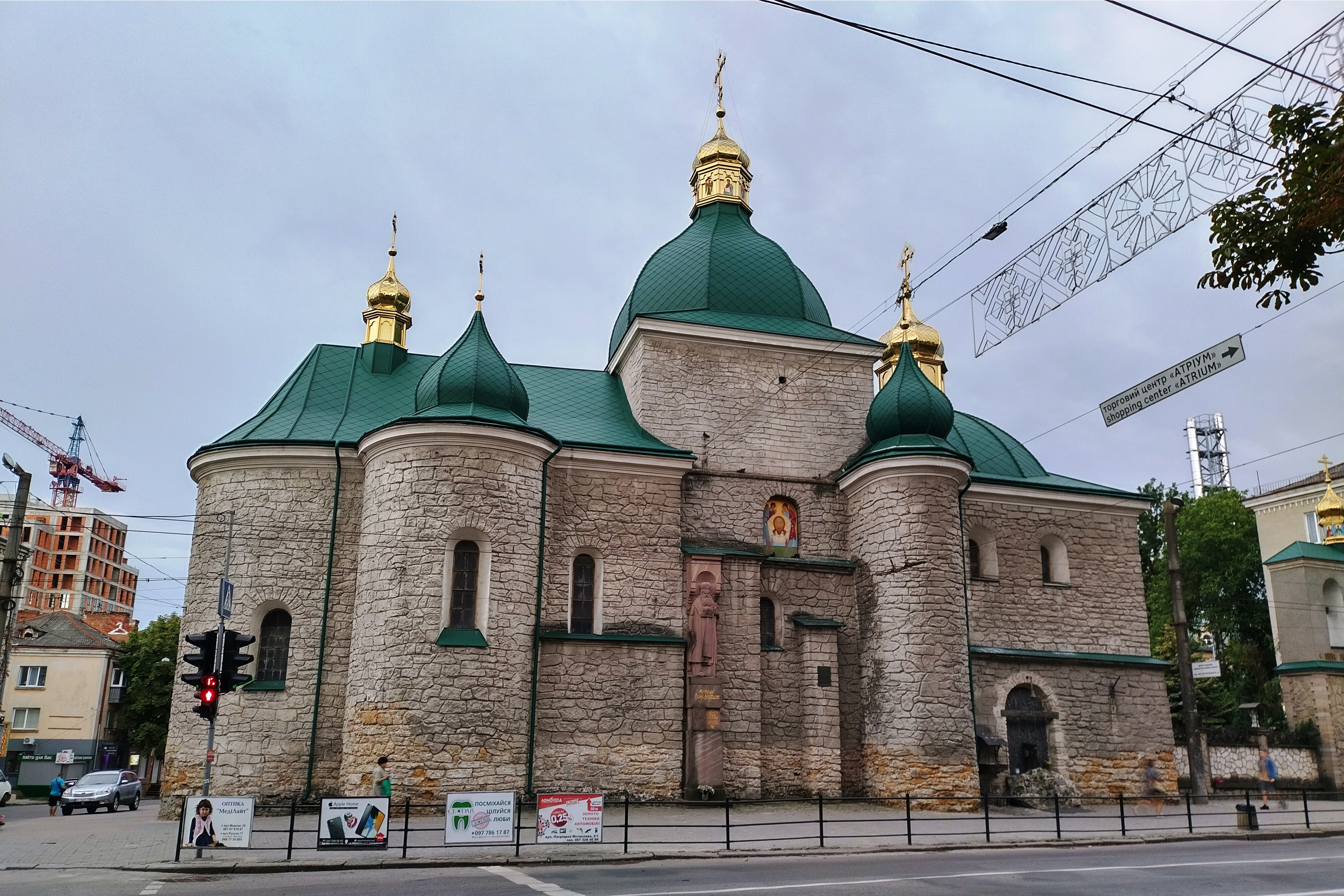
Church of the Nativity

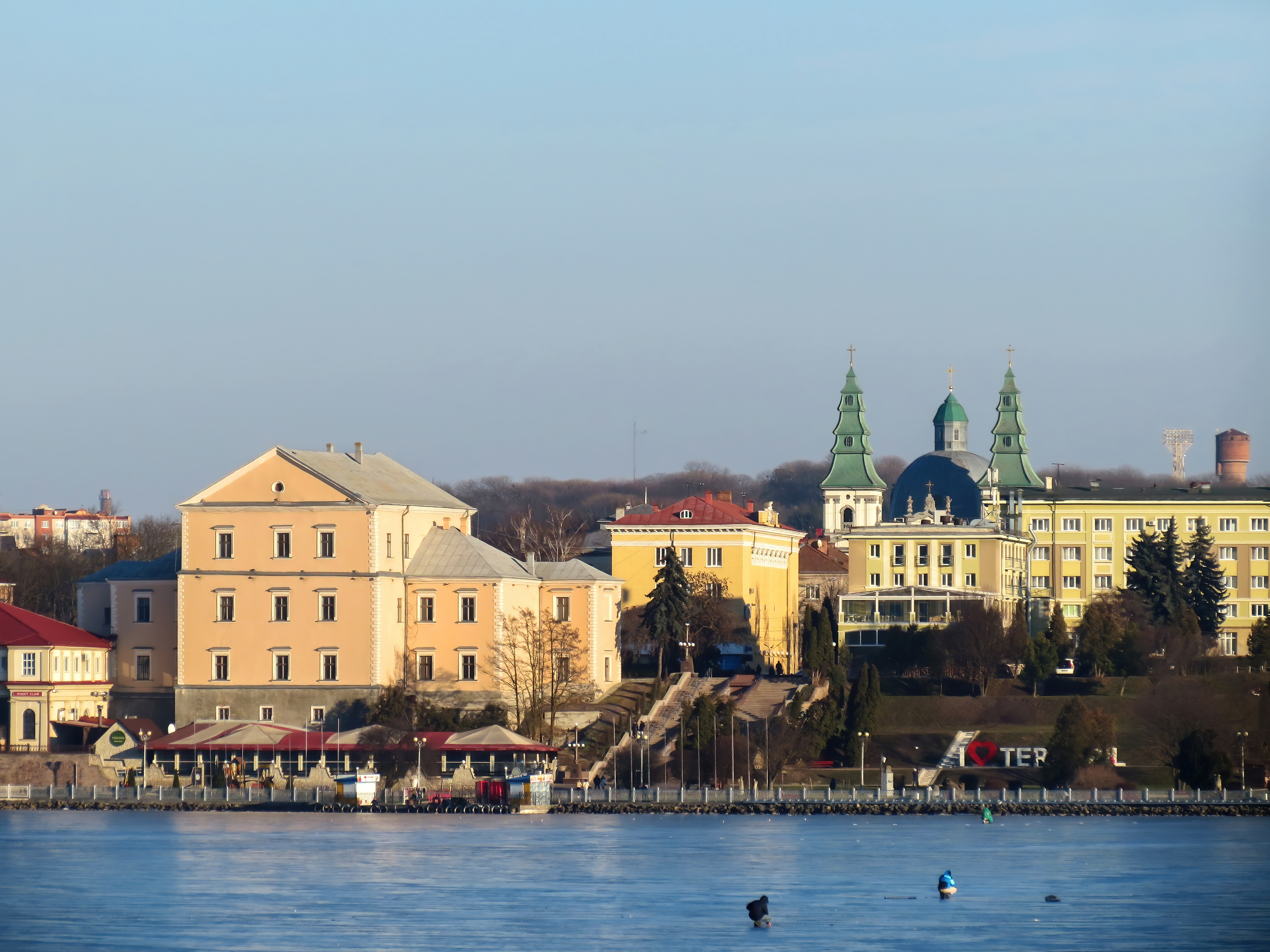
Ternopil Castle

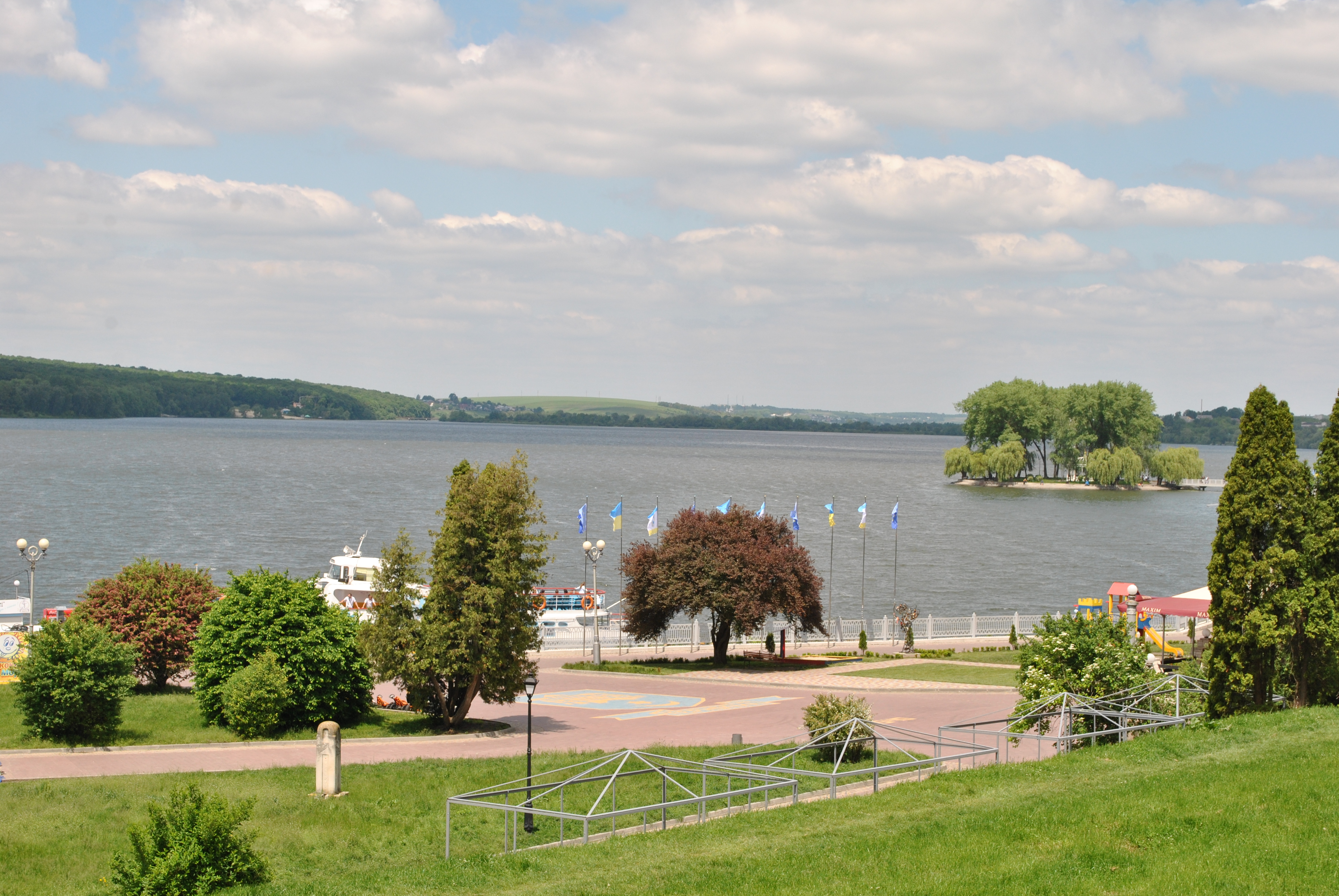
Ternopil Pond

== Notable people ==
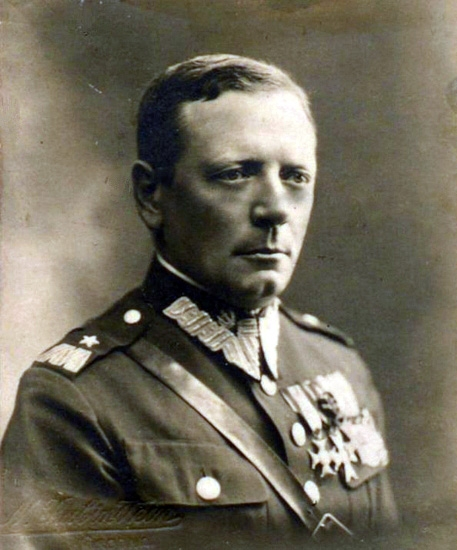
Franciszek Kleeberg

- Kazimierz Ajdukiewicz (1890–1963), Polish philosopher and logician, researched model theory
- Henryk Baranowski (1943–2013), Polish theatre, opera and film director, actor, playwright and poet
- Vasyl Barvinsky (1888–1963), Ukrainian composer, pianist, conductor and musicologist
- Eugeniusz Baziak (1890–1962), Archbishop of Lviv and apostolic administrator of Kraków.
- Natalia Buchynska (born 1977), singer, brought up in Ternopil.
- Mykola Bychok (born 1980), Ukrainian Greek Catholic cardinal and bishop
- Vitaly Derekh (1987–2022), Ukrainian journalist and soldier
- Mariia Dilai (born 1980), Ukrainian artist, designer, and social activist
- Ihor Duda (1940–2025), Ukrainian art historian, local historian, teacher, editor, restorer, and cultural activist
- Alexandre Eremenko (born 1954), Ukrainian-American mathematician
- Daria Chubata (born 1940), Ukrainian physician, author and social activist
- Mykola Chubatyi (1889-1975), historian of Ukrainian Church
- Cyryl Czarkowski-Golejewski (1885–1940), aristocratic Polish landowner and Katyn massacre victim
- Charlotte Eisler (1894-1970), Austrian singer and pianist with the Second Viennese School
- Kornel Filipowicz (1913–1990), Polish novelist, poet, screenwriter and short story writer
- Volodymyr Hromnytskyi (1862–1938) was a Ukrainian Greek Catholic priest, Kryloshanin, religious and public figure
- Franciszek Kleeberg (1888–1941), Polish general in the Austro-Hungarian Army
- Bohdan Levkiv (1950–2021), Ukrainian politician and mayor of Ternopil from 2002 to 2006
- Oleh Loshniv (1887–1934), Ukrainian painter, graphic artist and educator
- Pepi Litman (1874–1930), cross-dressing female Yiddish vaudeville singer
- Volodymyr Luchakivskyi (1838–1903), Ukrainian public figure, writer, translator, lawyer, and the first Ukrainian burgomaster of Ternopil
- Kazimierz Michałowski, (1901–1981), Polish archaeologist, Egyptologist and art historian
- Serhiy Nadal (born 1975), Ukrainian politician and mayor of Ternopil since 2010
- Yuriy Oliynyk (1931–2021), Ukrainian composer, concert pianist and professor of music in the United States

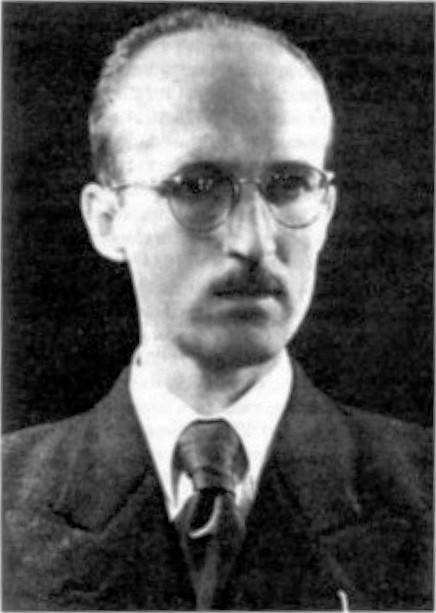
Yaroslav Stetsko

- Jakub Karol Parnas (1884–1949), biochemist, born in Ternopil
- Joseph Perl, (1773–1839), Ashkenazi Jewish educator and writer, a scion of the Haskalah
- Simhah Pinsker (1801–1864), Polish-Jewish scholar and archeologist
- Antoni Reichenberg (1825–1903), Polish priest, Jesuit, and artist
- Rudolf Pöch (1870–1921), doctor and anthropologist; pioneer photographer and cinematographer
- Roza Pomerantz-Meltzer (1880–1934), Polish writer and novelist based in Lviv and politician
- Solomon Judah Loeb Rapoport (1786–1867), a Galician and Czech rabbi and Jewish scholar
- Karol Rathaus (1895—1954), Polish-Austrian-American modernist composer
- Eduard Romanyuta (born 1992), Ukrainian singer, songwriter, actor and TV presenter
- Baron Lajos Simonyi de Barbács et Vitézvár (1824–1894), Hungarian politician
- Dioniziy Sholdra (1925–1995), Ukrainian painter, architect, and restorer
- Ruslan Stefanchuk (born 1975), Ukrainian politician, party chairman and lawyer
- Yaroslav Stetsko (1912–1986), leader of Organization of Ukrainian Nationalists (OUN) from 1968
- Oleh Syrotyuk (born 1978), Ukrainian politician, Governor of Ternopil Oblast in 2014
- Jan Tarnowski (1488-1561), Polish general and nobleman, founder of Ternopil (as Tarnopol).
- Judd L. Teller (1912–1972), Jewish author, social historian and poet; emigrated to the United States in 1921
- Tvorchi, electronic music duo that represented Ukraine in the Eurovision Song Contest 2023
- Baroness Adelma Vay (1840–1925), medium and pioneer of spiritualism in Slovenia and Hungary

=== Sport ===
- Olga Babiy (born 1989), Ukrainian chess player and Woman Grandmaster
- Petr Badlo (born 1976), Ukrainian football manager and former footballer with 470 club caps
- Olha Maslivets (born 1978), Russian windsurfer who competed at four Summer Olympics
- Ihor Semenyna (born 1989), Ukrainian football midfielder with 330 club caps

=== People from Ternopil Oblast ===
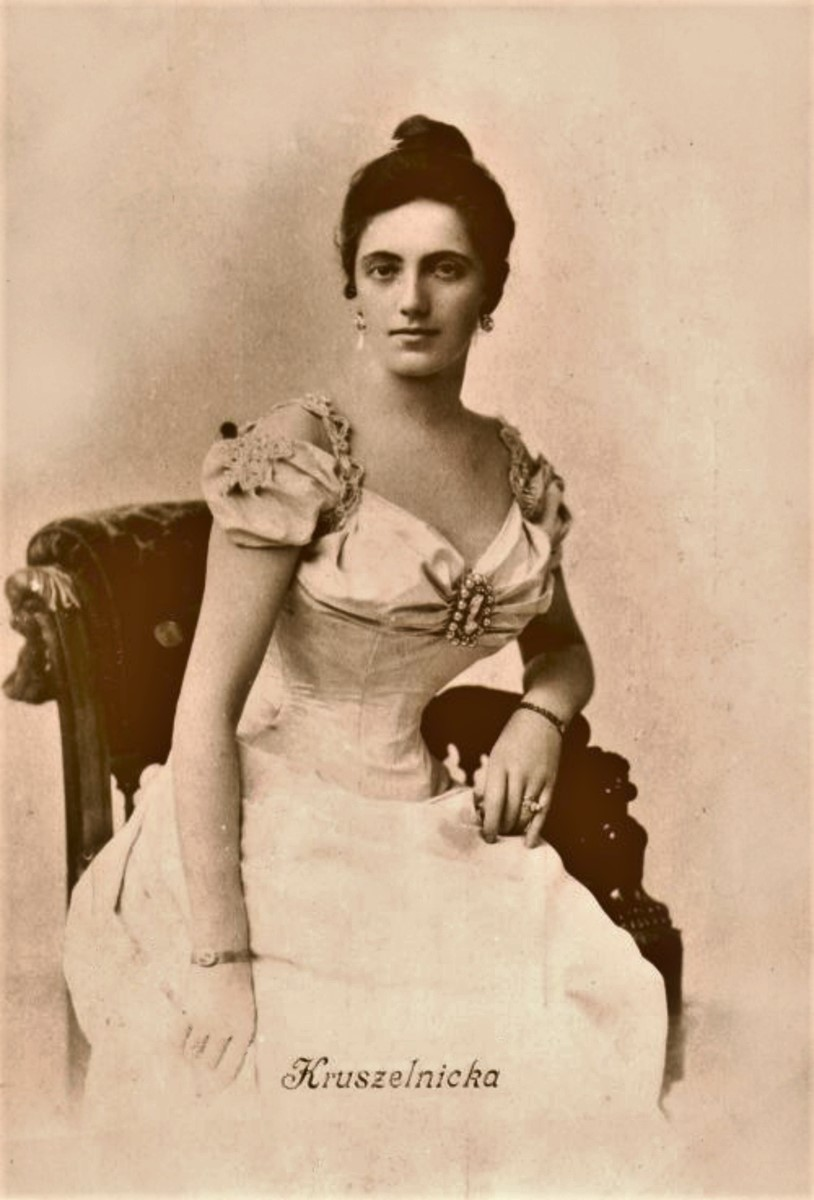
Solomiya Krushelnytska

- Aleksander Brückner, (1856 in Berezhany – 1939), Polish scholar of Slavic languages and literature
- Ihor Gereta (1938–2002), Ukrainian archaeologist, public and political figure, and art historian
- Volodymyr Hnatiuk (1871 in Velesniv, Buchach – 1926), Ukrainian writer, literary scholar, journalist and ethnographer
- Bohdan Lepky (1872-1941), Ukrainian writer, poet and artist
- Ivan Horbachevsky (1854-1942), Ukrainian chemist and politician active in Austria-Hungary, Minister of Healthcare of Cisleithania
- Josyf Slipyj (1892-1984), Ukrainian Greek Catholic priest, Metropolitan of Lviv and Halych
- Solomiya Krushelnytska (1872 in Biliavyntsi — 1952), Ukrainian soprano
- Bohdan Lepky (1872 in Krehulets – 1941), Ukrainian writer, poet, scholar, public figure, and artist
- Ivan Pului (1845 in Hrymailiv – 1918), physicist and inventor, developed use of X-rays for medical imaging
- Casimir Zeglen (1869 near Tarnopol - 1927), Polish-American engineer, inventor of commercial bulletproof vest
- Methodius (Kudriakov) (1949-2015), metropolitan of the Ukrainian Autocephalous Orthodox Church.
- Serhiy Prytula (born 1981 in Zbarazh), Ukrainian TV show host, political activist, founder of Charity Foundation of Serhiy Prytula
- Volodymyr Chornobay (born 1954), Ukrainian artist
- Karolina Shiino (born 1997), Japanese model and disgraced winner of the 2024 Miss Nippon pageant

=== Lived in Ternopil ===
- Sofia Yablonska (1907-1971), Ukrainian-French travel writer, photographer and architect
- Les Kurbas (1887-1937), Ukrainian theatre director and actor, founder of the first Ukrainian theatre in Ternopil

== International relations ==
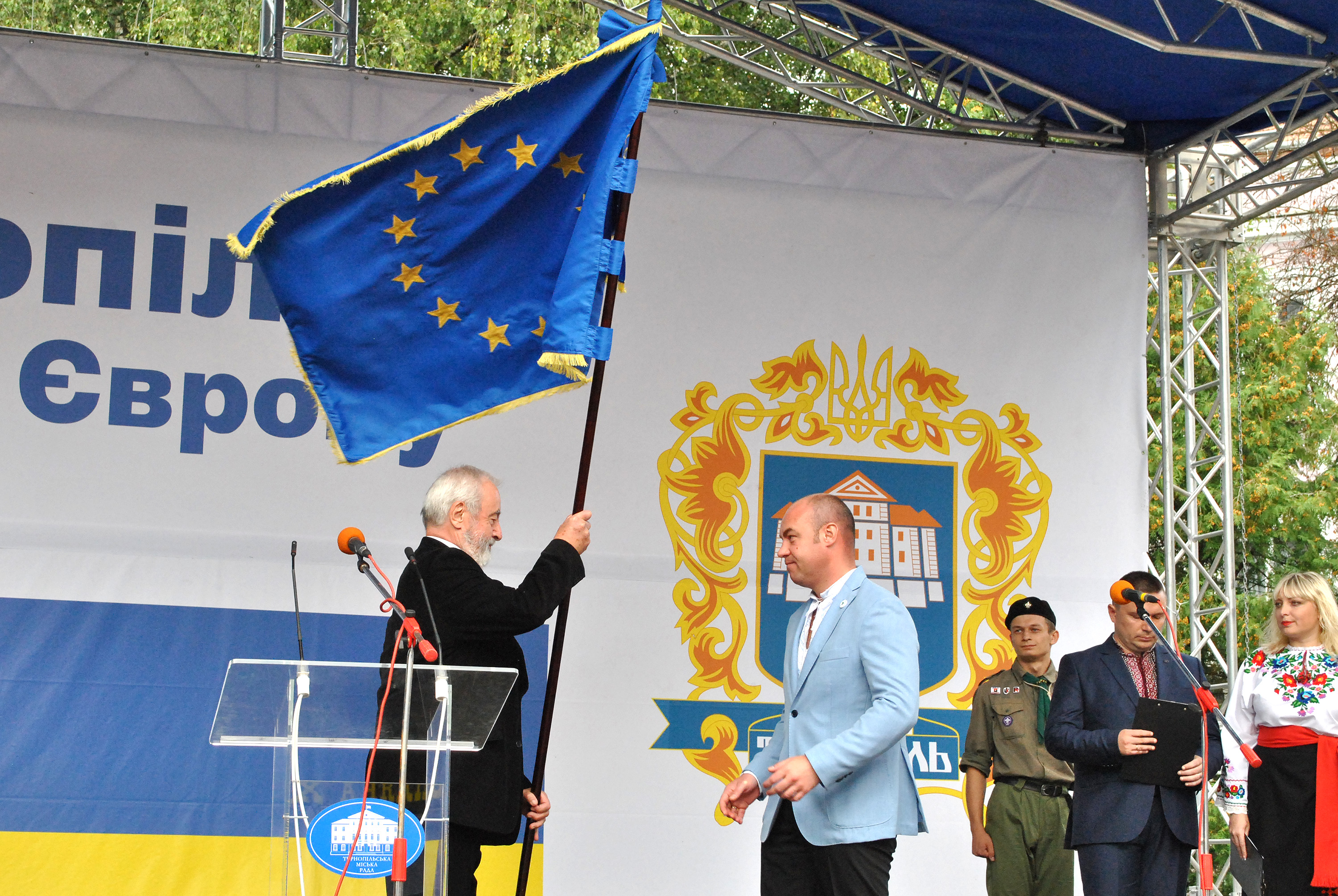
Mayor of Ternopil awarded with a Council of Europe flag by a PACE member during a ceremony in 2014

Ternopil is twinned with:

- Erftstadt, Germany since 2023
- Sliven, Bulgaria
- Yonkers, United States (since 1991)
- Elbląg in Poland (since 1992)
- Chorzów, Poland
- Prudentopolis, Brazil
- (Georgia (country)) Batumi, Georgia

Former twin towns include:

- Tarnów in Poland
- Pinsk in Belarus

=== Stadium naming controversy ===
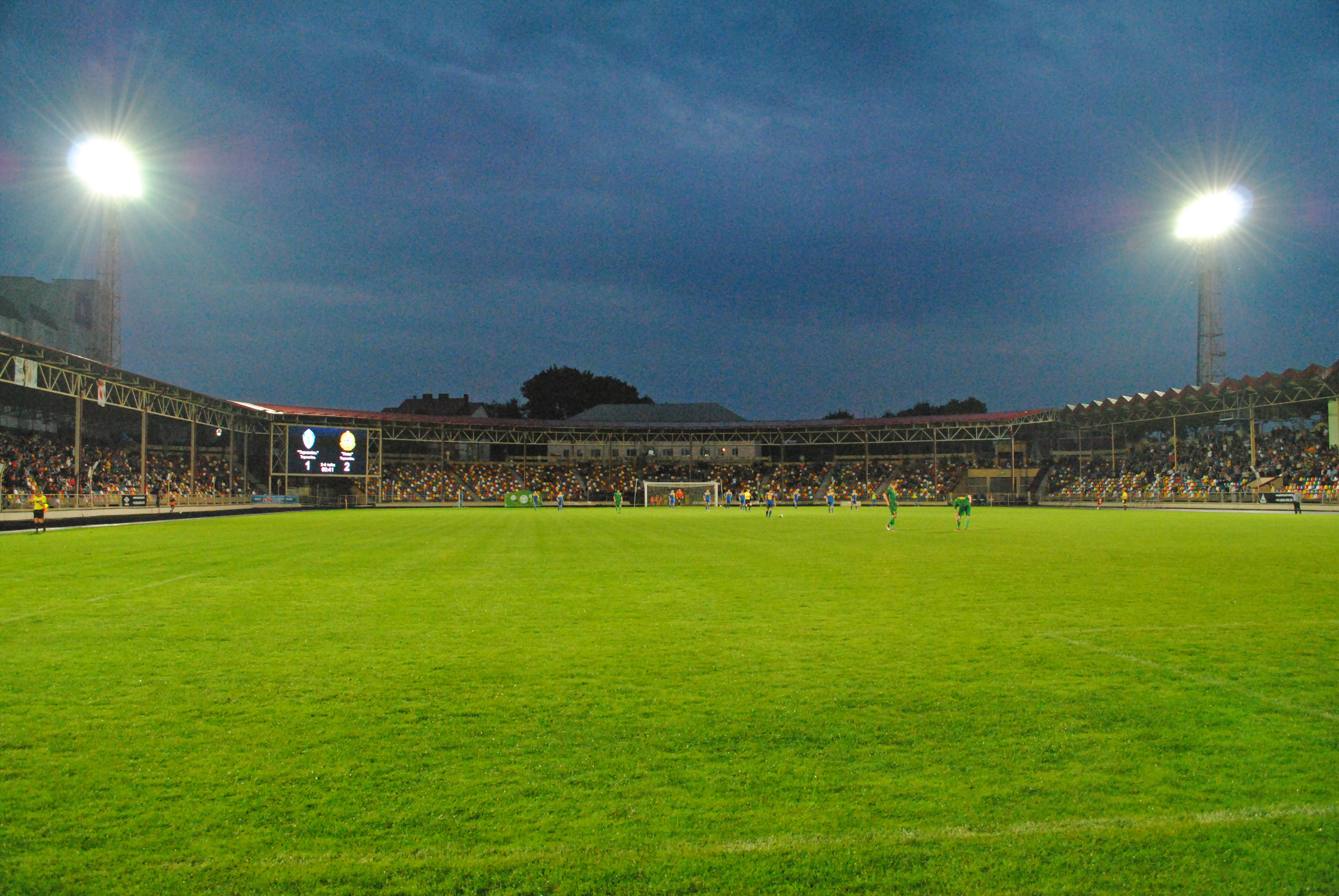
City stadium of Ternopil

In 2021, Ternopil created international outrage, especially in the Jewish community, by deciding to name a city stadium in honor of Nazi collaborator Roman Shukhevych. Shukhevych was the military leader of the Ukrainian Insurgent Army during World War II and was known for his collaboration with the Nazi regime as well as his responsibility for the massacres of Poles in Volhynia and Eastern Galicia. As a result, the City Council of Tarnów decided to suspend its partnership with Ternopil.

Joel Lion, the Israeli Ambassador to Ukraine, expressed Israel’s strong objection to the city's choice to name the stadium in honor of Roman Shukhevych. Lion wrote, "We strongly condemn the decision of Ternopil city council to name the City Stadium after the infamous Hauptman (Captain) of the SS 201st Schutzmannschaft Roman Shukhevych and demand the immediate cancellation of this decision".

The Eastern Europe Director of the Simon Wiesenthal Center, Efraim Zuroff wrote, "It is fully understandable that Ternopil seeks to honor those who fought against Soviet Communism, but not those behind the mass murder of innocent fellow citizens." in a statement attempting to convince Ternopil to reconsider the "renaming of its stadium in honor of Nazi collaborator, Hauptmann of the SS Schutzmannschaft 201, Roman Shukhevych, an active participant in the mass murder of Jews and Poles in World War II."

=== Russo-Ukrainian War ===
In June 2022, due to the full-scale Russian invasion and missile strikes from the territory of Belarus, Ternopil suspended its partnership with the city of Pinsk.

== Festivals ==
An international open-air music festival called Faine Misto has been held annually near Ternopil for two to four days in July since 2013.

== Sources ==
- A. Bresler, Joseph Perl, Warsaw, 1879, passim;
- Allg. Zeit. des Jud. 1839, iii. 606;
- J. H. Gurland, Le-Ḳarot ha-Gezerot, p. 22, Odesa, 1892;
- Meyers Konversations-Lexikon
- Orgelbrandt, in Encyklopedia Powszechna, xiv. 409;
