= Ternopil Regional Art Museum =

Art museum in Ternopil, Ukraine

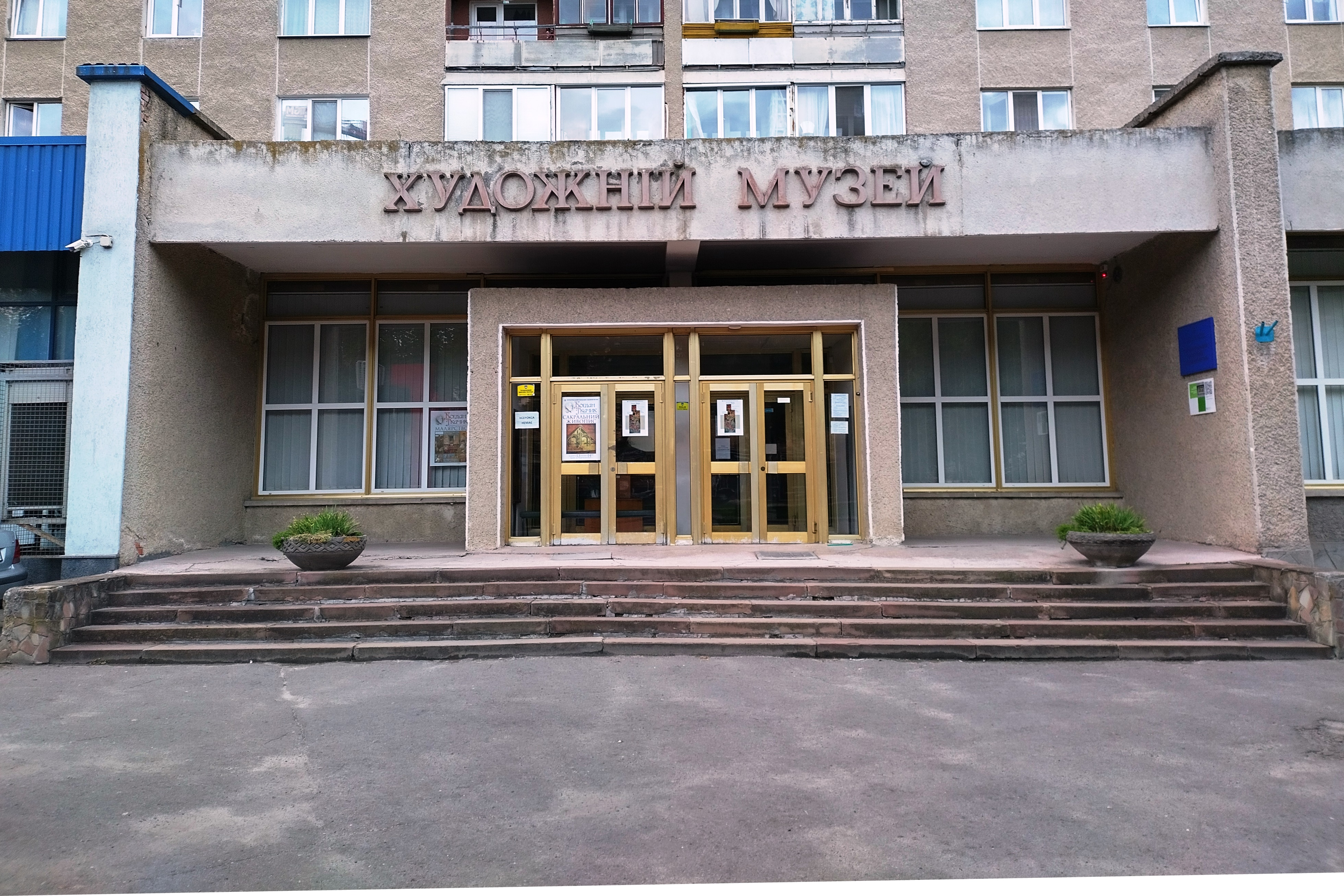
- Established: May 1, 1991
- Location: Ternopil, Solomii Krushelnytskoi str. 1
- Collection size: 8011 exhibits
- Director: Hryhorii Sherhei

The Ternopil Regional Art Museum (Ukrainian: Тернопільський обласний художній музей) is a museum in the north-central part of Ternopil, Ukraine. It was founded on 1 May 1991 on the base of the former art gallery — a department of museum of regional ethnography. The museum aims to research the stock, education (lectures and excursions), exposition, exhibition, methodical and restoration work.

The museum collection includes paintings, graphics, sculptures, arts and crafts. Among the exhibits are icons of the 17th to 19th centuries, carvings of Johann Georg Pinsel and Anton Osinskyi. Permanent exhibition is based on historical and chronological order and represents the art of Ukraine and Western Europe.

== History ==
The art museum has a long history. Its ancestry starts from Podil'skyi Regional Museum, which opened on 13 April 1913. The founder of the museum was Professor S. Sorokivskyi. He also worked out the first museum guide. Among the exhibits were works of professional painting and sculpture, carpets and embroidery, coins, and original documents. During the First World War, the Russians destroyed the collection.

The destroyed building was restored in 1925. The museum collection had a regional nature and consisted of four sections: historical, ethnographic, modern art (arts and crafts) and nature.

The first hall is dedicated to Ukrainian art and is divided into three sections. The first one represents painting, carving and graphic arts in Galicia of the 17th century and sacral art from the 19th to the beginning of the 20th century. Here one can see original works in the Ukrainian Baroque style of the middle 18th century: J.G. Pinzel bas-reliefs, wooden plastic arts of A. Osynsky, ancient printed books.

The second section presents the materials about Ukrainian landscape painters creative work. And, in the last one, there are paintings of artists whose life or creative work is connected with Ternopil.

In the third hall one can see West European graphic arts given over by the Hermitage (Saint Petersburg, Russia). The masterpieces of Italian, German and French artists are of great interest. The paintings of Polish and Russian artists also occupy the prominent place in the museum exposition.

The fourth one — the Memorial hall of D. Sholdra, the first museum's restorer. He presented his 50 pictures to the museum. One can see some of them in the Memorial hall.

For the second time the opening of the museum was on 9 November 1930. At the same time published second museum guide. The museum funds in autumn 1939 were replenished by many works of art of Western Europe of the 17th to 19th centuries from the nationalized collections the Counts Potocki and Kozyebrodsky.

After World War II the museum resumed its operations on 15 July 1945.

In the early 1960s, the museum has replenished icons, historical books, engravings, bas-relief by J.G. Pinsel. Collected works Regional museum formed the basis of an art gallery, which opened on 6 May 1978 in the former Dominican church. Considerable assistance in organizing the gallery provided by leading museum of Ukraine and management of art exhibitions UUA (Union of Ukraine Artists).

Actually Ternopil Regional Art Museum was founded on 1 May 1991, based on the former Art Gallery, one of the department of museum of regional ethnography. In fact, it started on 1 June 1991.

The first exhibition of works by Andrew Patrick (1919-1990) was opened on August 9 at the same (1991) year. And in October, opened the exhibition of works of Ukrainian and foreign art that is still work.

== Activity and exposure ==
The museum collection as of 1 January 2009 has 8011 exhibits including paintings - 765, graphics - 6965, sculptures - 140, arts and crafts - 141. Permanent exhibition is based on historical and chronological order and represents the art of Ukraine and Western Europe.

Among the exhibits of Ukrainian art are icons of the 17th to 19th centuries, carving J. G. Pinsel and Anton Osinskyi, portraits, historical books with engravings from the 18th century.

Dioniziy Sholdra, a museum restorer and artist from New York who was born in Ternopil, worked in the Museum of Art during 1993–1995. He gave to the museum 50 paintings and laid the foundation of the restoration case.

September 1998 opened Memorial Hall D. Sholdry, which exhibits works, photographs and documents, restoration instruments and materials, personal things of the artist.

== Directors ==
- Ihor Duda (1991–2021)
- Hryhorii Sherhei (from 2021)
