= Sofia Yablonska =

Ukrainian-French writer and architect

- Софія Яблонська
- Born: 15 May 1907; Tarasivka, Ukraine
- Died: 4 February 1971 (aged 63); Noirmoutier, France
- Occupations: Travel writer, architect

Sofia Yablonska-Oudin (Ukrainian: Софія Яблонська-Уден; fr. Sophie Yablonska-Oudin; 15 May 1907 – 4 February 1971) was a Ukrainian-French travel writer, photographer, and architect. She was born in Kingdom of Galicia and Lodomeria, but lived itinerantly, her family moved to Russia during the World War I and moved back to Western Ukraine in 1921. In the late 1920s she emigrated to Paris. In Paris, Yablonska became a journalist and began travelling the world; she later used these experiences to write three books. Yablonska retired to Noirmoutier in 1950 with her husband and three children (incl. future senator of France: Jacques Oudin) and became an architect.

== Early life ==
Sofia Yablonska was born on 15 May 1907 in Germaniv (now Tarasivka), in the Habsburg Kingdom of Galicia and Lodomeria, near Lemburg (now Lviv). Her father was Ivan Yablonski, a Ukrainian Greek Catholic priest and doctor, and her mother was also from a priestly family.

During the Great Retreat, the withdrawal of the Russian Imperial Army from Halychyna in 1915, Ivan, who held Russophile views took the family to Taganrog, in southern Russia. In 1921, the Yablonskas returned to Galicia, residing first in Kozova and then in Yalinkova. Economic hardship necessitated the splitting up of the family at Yalinkova. Sofia and her brother, Yaroslav, initially lived with relatives at Yazlovets, near Buchach but then moved to Ternopil. There, Sofia attended gymnasium and was taught sewing, bookkeeping, and acting. In 1927, she emigrated to Paris, aged 20, to attend film school and become an actress. Yablonska first found work as a window-cleaner, but eventually landed a small role in a Pathé film. She also worked as a model.

== Journalist career and travels ==
While she lived in Paris, Yablonska made friends in the Parisian art scene. Among them was Stepan Levynsky, an orientalist and fellow Ukrainian migrant. Levynsky convinced Yablonska to become a photo reporter and to travel the world. Her career would take her to Morocco, China, Sri Lanka, Laos, Cambodia, Java, Bali, Tahiti, Australia, the United States, and Canada. Through the 1930s, she published stories about her travels in Galician magazines such as Women's Fate (Ukrainian: Жіноча доля) and New Home (Ukrainian: Нова хата). Yablonska's work and travels made her one of the first women documentary cinematographers. A recurring theme of her work was the negative effects of European colonialism on local culture and her own difficulties with Western Europeans.

The Ukrainian publishing house Pyramid republished Jablonska's three travel journals in 2015.

=== Morocco ===
In early 1929, Yablonska traveled to Morocco and spent three months in-country. She later used her experiences there to write Charm of Morocco (Char Marokko; Ukrainian: Чар Марокко), published by the Shevchenko Scientific Society in 1932. The book is a collection of Yablonska's encounters with traditional Moroccan culture, structured like a diary and was illustrated with 12 photographs. It was translated into French in 1973 by Marta Kalytovska. A German edition of Charm of Morocco was published in 2020.

=== China ===
Yablonska returned to France from Morocco in the same year as her departure. found work making documentaries with the Societe Indochine Films et Cinema and inspiration from Levynsky, and decided to travel to China. There, while shooting film, she met Jean Oudin, a French ambassador, whom she wed in 1933. The couple had three children in China and French Indochina, and resided in both countries until 1946. Yablonska used a fake business as a front to record daily street traffic in China, and introduced Chinese passers-by to Ukrainian culture. Yablonska wrote From the Land of Rice and Opium (Z kraïny ryzhu ta opiiu; З країни рижу та опію), published in 1936, from her experiences in China and Southeast Asia. It was followed in 1939 by Far Horizons (Daleki obriï; Далекі обрії).

== Return to France ==
Yablonska and her family returned to Paris in 1946. They moved in 1950 to the island of Noirmoutier, where she worked as an architect, and where Jean died in 1955. Yablonska died in a car accident on 4 February 1971 while en route to Paris with the manuscript of her final work, Two Weights, Two Measures (Dvi vahy—dvi miry; Дві ваги — дві міри). Sofia and Jean were buried next to each other in Vernouillet, Yvelines but were reinterred on Noirmoutier in 1973.

== List of works ==
=== Books ===
==== Travel writing ====
- Le Charm of Morocco (Char Marokko; Ukrainian: Чар Марокко; The Charm of Morocco"; "Der Charme von Marokko. Travelogue):
  - Ukraine: Lviv: Shevchenko Scientific Society, Lviv, 1932 OCLC 81406147;
  - France: Paris [s.n.] 1973 Paris Impr. P.I.U.F. (in French) OCLC 461501331;
  - Ukraine: Rodovid 2018 (in Ukrainian) ISBN 978-617-7482-27-6;
  - Germany: KUPIDO Literaturverlag 2020 (in German) ISBN 978-3966750103;
- Au pays du riz et de l'opium (Z kraïny ryzhu ta opiiu; З країни рижу та опію; From the Land of Rice and Opium):
  - Ukraine: Lviv: Biblioteka "Dila" (2 vols) 1936 (in Ukrainian) OCLC 234320099;
  - France: Paris: Nouv. éd. latines, cop. 1986 (in French) ISBN 2-7233-0338-1 / ISBN 9782723303385;
  - Ukraine: Rodovid 2018 (in Ukrainian) ISBN 978-617-7482-28-3;
- Two Weights, Two Measures (Dvi vahy — dvi miry; Дві ваги — дві міри; Deux poids – deux mesures: contes et essais):
  - France: Paris 1972 (in Ukrainian) OCLC 8970309;
  - France: Paris 1972 (in French);
- L’année ensorcelée: Nouvelle:
  - France: Paris [La Guérinière] [M. Kalytovska] 1972 Paris Impr. P.I.U.F. (in French);
- Les horizons lointains (Daleki obriï: podoroz︠h︡ni narysy; Daleki gorryzonty; Distant Horizons):
  - Ukraine: Lviv: Biblioteka "Dila" (2 vols): 1939 OCLC 44819137;
  - France: Paris: Nouvelles éditions latines, 1977 (in French) ISBN 2-7233-0003-X / ISBN 9782723300032;
  - Ukraine: Kyiv: Rodovid 2018 (in Ukrainian) ISBN 978-617-7482-29-0;
- Mon enfance en Ukraine: Souvenirs sur mon père (Knyha pro bat:':ka: z moho dytynstva; Book about [My] Father: From My Childhood):
  - France: 1977,
  - France: Paris: Nouvelles éditions latines, 1981 (in French) ISBN 2-7233-0114-1 / ISBN 9782723301145;
  - France: Edmonton Paris Slovo [1978] Paris Impr. PIUF (in Ukrainian) OCLC 461588983;
- Листи з Парижа. Листи з Китаю: Подорожні нариси, новели, оповідання, есеї, інтерв’ю (Lysty z Paryza. Lysty z Kytaiu. Podorozni narysy, novely, opovidannia, esei, іnterviu)
  - Ukraine: Piramida 2018 (in Ukrainian) ISBN 978-966-441-518-4.
- Чар Марока. З країни рижу та опію. Далекі обрії (3 in 1 volume)
  - Ukraine: Piramida 2015 (in Ukrainian) ISBN 978-966-441-381-4;

==== Photography ====
- Téoura: Sophie Jablonska (Intro: Oksana Zabozhko):
  - Ukraine: Kyiv: Rodovid 2018 (in Ukrainian; photographies by Sofia Yablonska-Oudin) ISBN 978-966-7845-40-7.
