= Volodymyr Chornobay =

Ukrainian artist (born 1954)

- Володимир Миколайович Чорнобай
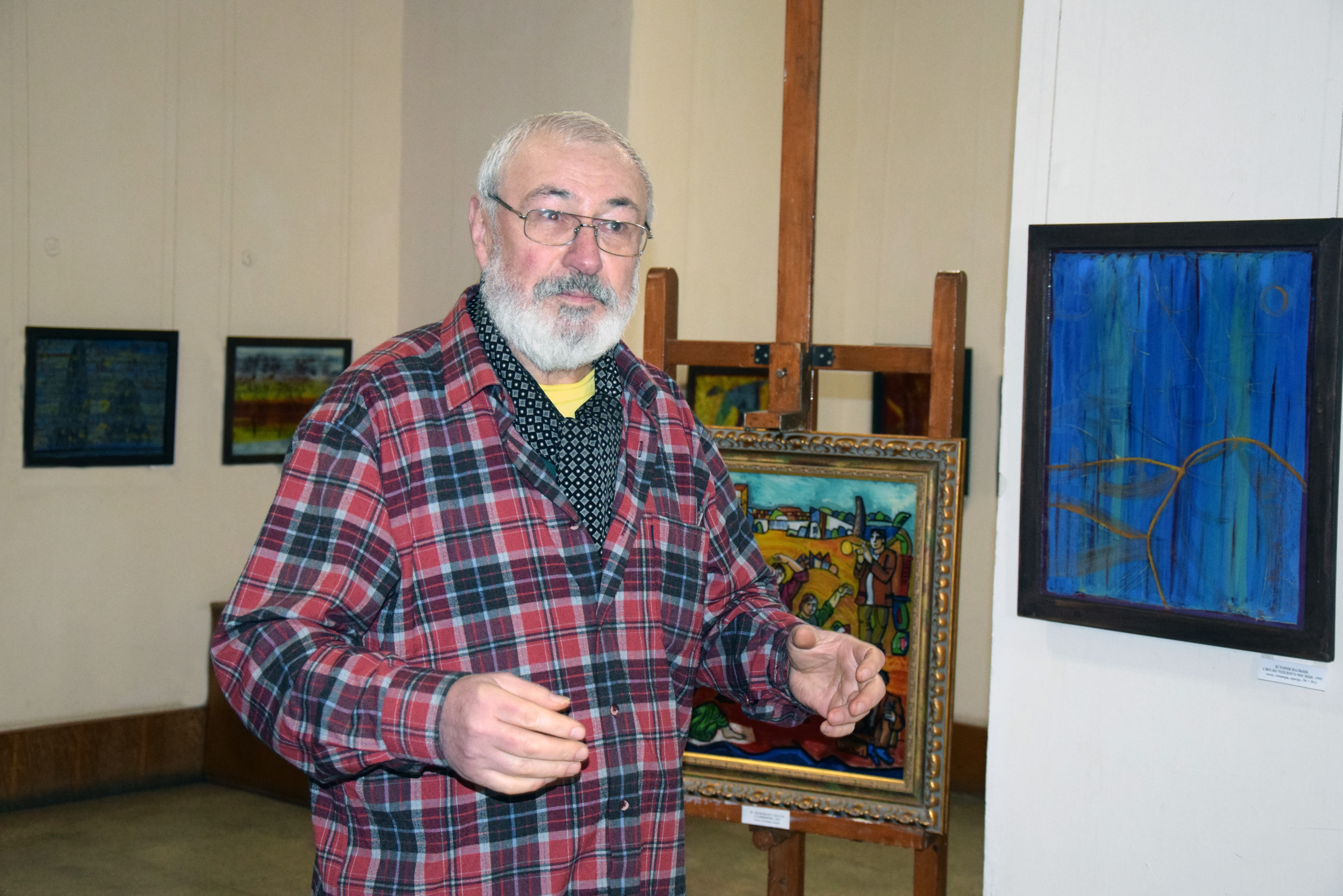
- Born: Volodymyr Mykolaiovych Chornobay; 17 March 1954 (age 72); Mikhaylovskoye, Moscow Oblast, Soviet Union
- Education: Lviv School of Applied Arts, Lviv Institute of Applied and Decorative Arts
- Occupation: Artist
- Awards: Merited Painter of Ukraine

Volodymyr Mykolaiovych Chornobay (Ukrainian: Володимир Миколайович Чорнобай; born 17 March 1954 in Mikkaylovskoye, Soviet Union) is a Ukrainian artist. He is a member of the National Union of Artists of Ukraine (1989), the Association of Polish Artists and Designers (2009), and the "Kvarta" art group. Brother of Yurii Chornobai.

== Biography ==
Volodymyr Chernobay was born on 17 March 1954 in Mikhaylovskoye, Moscow Oblast.

He graduated from the Lviv School of Applied Arts (1973), Lviv Institute of Applied and Decorative Arts (1980, teachers N. Fedchun, T. Drahan).

From 1981 – in Ternopil.

== Creativity ==
He is engaged in classical stained glass and easel painting, graphics, from 1989 – painting on glass.

His main works: a series of works on glass "Ruky" (1990), "Virtualnyi portret suchasnyka" (1995), "Pikui-Krasiia" (1994-2002), "Pinko-Pinokkio" (2006), etc. His works are kept in museums and private collections in Ukraine, Slovakia, Poland, Spain, Germany and the USA.

From 1984, he participated in more than 40 collective exhibitions in Ukraine, Bulgaria, Spain, Germany, Poland, Slovakia, and Hungary. He participated in international and national plein airs.

More than 70 solo exhibitions in Ternopil (1992, 1994, 1995, 2002, 2009, 2010, 2011, 2014, 2022), Lviv (1993, 1997, 2013, 2020), Chernivtsi (1994); Lutsk (1995, 1996, 2016, 2017), Rivne (1996), Kyiv (1997, 2015); Kalisz (1999, 2005, 2009, 2012, 2014, 2015), Sieradz, Bytów (2000), Przeworsk (2002), Jarosław (2002, 2015), Elbląg (2003, 2005); Sławno (2004), Pabianice (2004, 2017), Pleszew (2005), Ostrów Wielkopolski (2005, 2016), Olsztyn (2005), Gołuchów, Ostrzeszów, Kępno (2006); Opatówek (2007), Krotoszyn (2007, 2011; all in Poland); Hamm (Germany, 2008), Ivano-Frankivsk (2008, 2012); Wolsztyn (2009); Śmigiel (2010), Schwedt (2010, Germany), Andrychów (2010, 2015), Środa Śląska (2010, 2012); Berlin (2012, 2015), Bolestraszyce/Przemyśl (2015), Włocławek (2016), Tarnobrzeg (2017).

== Awards ==
- Merited Painter of Ukraine (1 December 2016)
- laureate of the art exhibition "Christmas Mystery – 96" (1996, Lutsk)
- gold award of the First Contest and Exhibition of Modern Art (1996, Ternopil)
- III prize of the All-Ukrainian exhibition of painting on glass "Three Dimensions: Yesterday, Today and Tomorrow" (1998, Lviv)
- Ternopil Regional Prize named after Mykhailo Boychuk (2002)
- silver medal "Labor omnia vincit" of the Hipolit Cegielski Society (2009, Poznan, Poland)
- Award of the President of the City of Kalisz (Poland, 2015)
- Diploma of the international art exhibition Lviv Autumn Salon "High Castle 2015"
- Ternopil Regional Yaroslava Muzyka Award (2022)
