= Mayor of Ternopil =

Mayor of the City of Ternopil
- Coat of arms of Ternopil

- Flag of Ternopil

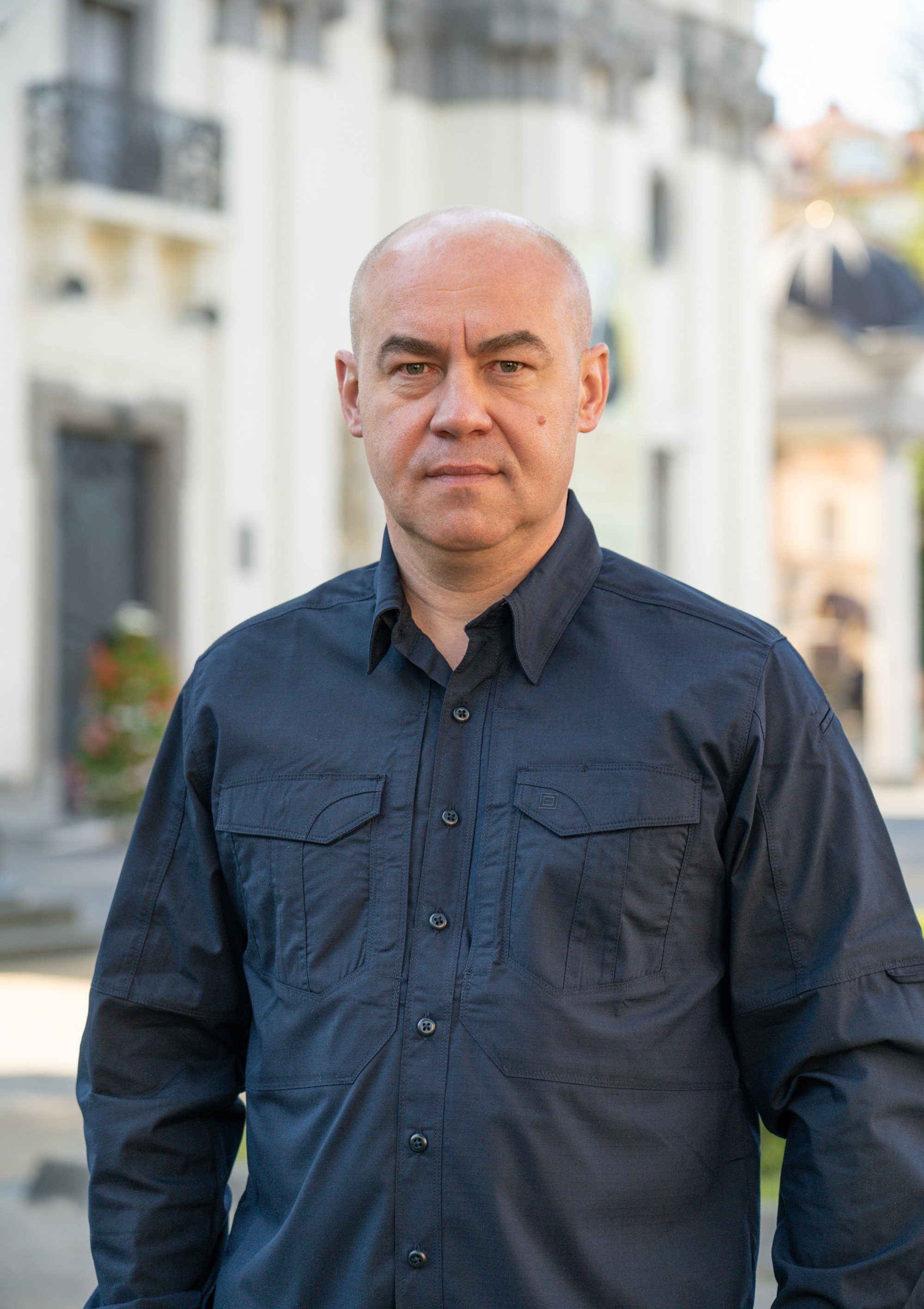
- Incumbent; Serhiy Nadal since 30 November 2010
- Website: http://www.nadal.te.ua/

The following is a list of mayors of the city of Ternopil, Ukraine. It includes positions equivalent to mayor, such as chairperson of the city council's executive committee.

== Mayors ==
=== Austrian Partition ===
- Mikołaj Kniaziołucki, 1816–1826
- Jan Marcinkiewicz, 1827-1844
- Antoni Dziamski, 1845-1849
- Sylwester Drzemalik, 1850-1853
- Waldemar Mandl, 1855-1868
- Raymond Schmidt, 1868-1972
- Leon Kozminski, 1872-1892
- Bolesław Studziński, 1892-1894
- Feliks Pohorecki, 1894-1896
- Wołodymyr Łuczakowski, 1896-1903
- Ludwik Punczert, 1903-1909
- Stanisław Mandl, 1909–1910, 1912–1915, 1917–1918
- Czesław Trembałowicz, 1910-1912
- Emil Michałowski, 1915-1917

=== West Ukrainian People's Republic ===
- Semen Sydoriak, 1918–1919

=== Second Republic ===
- Włodzimierz Lenkiewicz, 1920-1926
- Kazimierz Jaworczykowski, 1926-1927
- Wiktor Wielkopolanin-Nowakowski, 1928
- Kazimierz Choliński, 1929
- Stanisław Siedlecki, 1929
- Włodzimierz Lenkiewicz, 1929-1934
- Stanisław Widacki, 1934-1939

=== Ukraine ===
- Vyacheslav Nehoda, 1990–1998
- Anatoliy Kucherenko, 1998–2002
- Bohdan Levkiv, 2002–2006
- Roman Zastawny, 2006–2010
- Serhiy Nadal, 2010–present

== See also ==
- Ternopil history
