= Dioniziy Sholdra =

Ukrainian painter, restorer (1925–1995)

- Діонізій Шолдра
- Born: 16 October 1925; Ternopil
- Died: 29 September 1995 (aged 69); Ternopil
- Education: University of Innsbruck, Academy of Fine Arts Vienna
- Occupations: Painter, architect, and restorer

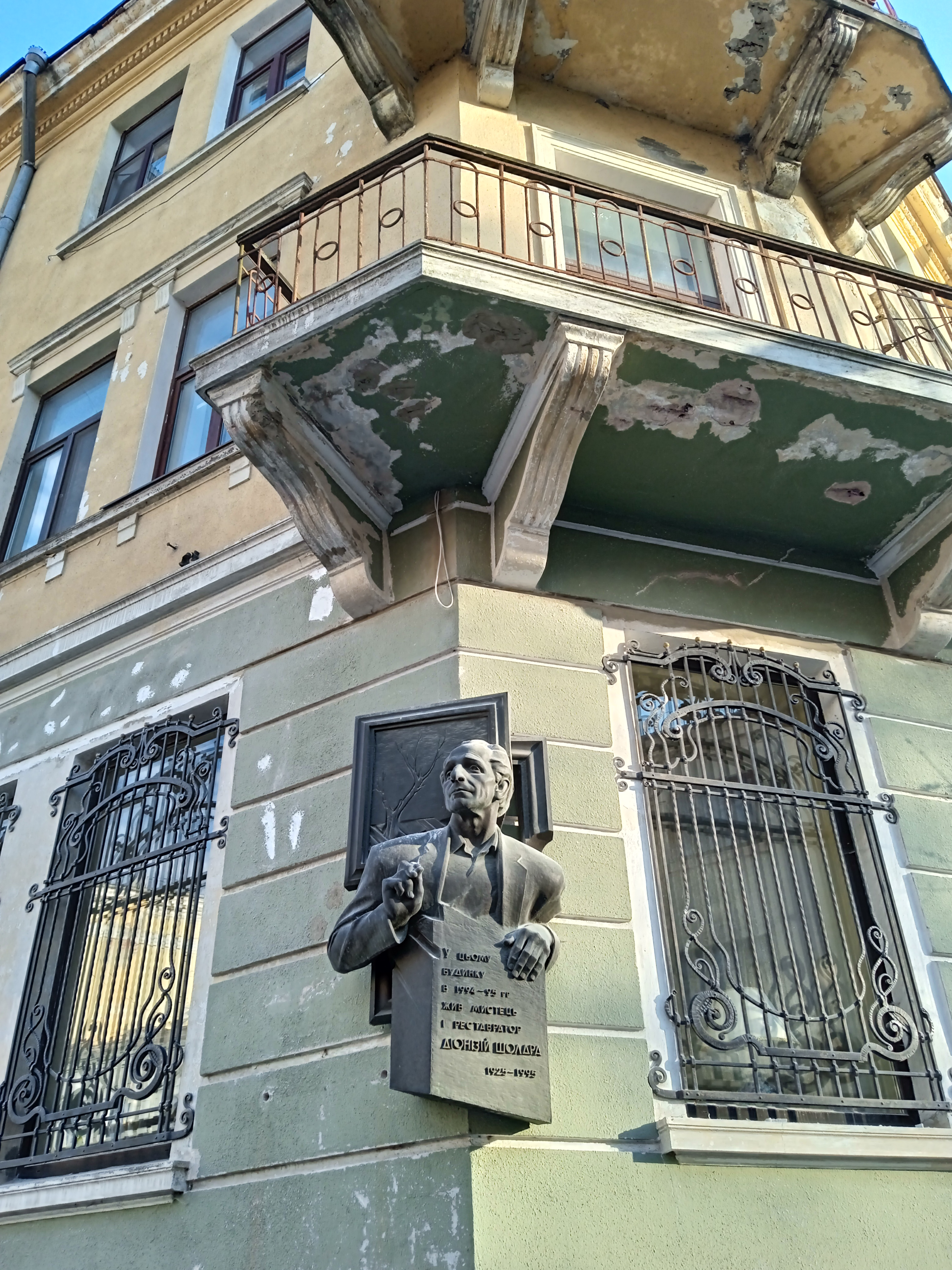
Memorial sign to Dioniziy Sholdra in Ternopil (8 Lystopadova Street)

Dioniziy Sholdra (Ukrainian: Діонізій Шолдра; 16 October 1925 – 29 September 1995) was a Ukrainian painter, architect, and restorer.

== Biography ==
He was born on 16 October 1925 in Ternopil. The house where the artist spent his childhood has been preserved to this day at 8 Lystopadova Street.

He studied at the Polish-language Second Ternopil Gymnasium. In March 1944, he left for the West. He studied painting, art history, and restoration theory at the University of Innsbruck, Austria.

In 1952, he became a member of the Ukrainian Artist's Association in USA. He studied painting and practical restoration at the Academy of Fine Arts Vienna. From 1958 to 1965, he was a professor at Ainberg and Valizer.

In 1975, Sholdra opened a restoration workshop in New York City (at the corner of 45th Street and 5th Avenue). Here he restored works of art, including pastels by Pablo Picasso and paintings by Salvador Dalí, whom he met on several occasions. In 1982, the workshop and his creative work were destroyed by fire. Two works were saved: a portrait of his daughter "Liuba" and a still life by French painter B. Nouville, which was later restored by Sholdra but disappeared in Kyiv in 1994 under unexplained circumstances.

He returned to his homeland during the time of Independent Ukraine.

From 1993 to 1995, he worked as the head of the restoration workshop at the Ternopil Regional Art Museum.

He died on 29 September 1995 in Ternopil. He was buried in the Mykulynetskyi cemetery.

== Exhibitions ==
Solo exhibitions:

- Lethbridge, Canada, 1965
- New York City, USA, 1983
- Kyiv, Ukraine, 1994
- Ternopil, Ukraine, 1995, 2005, 2015, 2023, 2025.

== Paintings ==
The works currently stored at the Ternopil Regional Art Museum were donated by the author in 1994:

- Peizazh z tserkvoiu, 1972
- Pislia bureviiu, 1990
- Zyma, 1983
- Materynstvo, 1965
- Vtikachi (Rozryvka. Smutok), 1964
- Bezdomni, 1965
- Stari budynky, 1971
- Vtikachi, 1964
- Ranok v lisi, 1983
- Pokhoron, 1964
- Dub, 1984
- Hirskyi potik, 1963
- Try verby, 1982
- Verby pislya doshchu, 1981
- Dorohovkaz, 1964
- Try dereva, 1981
- Hruden, 1982
- Eifelieva vezha, 1957
- Verba, 1981
- Plyazh El Paraíso (Chile), 1963
- Osinnie svitlo, 1983
- Avtoportret, 1951
- Samitnie derevo, 1964
- Ranok, 1947
- Zhinka z dytynoiu, 1951
- Portret zhinky, 1969
- Troianda, 1945
- Hora Little Chief, 1965
- Zamok u Kufstein (Austria), 1958
- Tort z troyandoiu, 1965
- Portret druzhyny, 1968
- Vezha, 1967
- Buria, 1964
- Samitnie derevo, 1983
- Avtoportret, 1953
- Avtoportret, 1956
- Na Verkhovyni, 1971
- Pislia buri, 1951
- Hora Riffler (Tyrol), 1946

== Honouring ==
In 1998, a memorial plaque (sculptor Oleksandr Maliar) was installed on the house at No. 8 on Lystopadova Street, on the corner of Mykhailo Hrushevskyi Street, where the artist spent his childhood.

The memory of Dioniziy Sholdra is immortalized in the Memorial Hall, which was opened at the Ternopil Regional Art Museum in 1998.

== Bibliography ==
- (in Ukrainian) Дуда І., Шолдра Діонізій // Ternopil Encyclopedic Dictionary: in 4 v. / editorial board: H. Yavorskyi and other, Ternopil: "Zbruch", 2008, V. 3: П—Я, S. 647. — ISBN 978-966-528-279-2.
- Стельмащук Г. Шолдра Діонізій // Українські митці у світі. — Л. : Апріорі, 2013. — С. 502–503.
- Яців Р. [Шолда Діонізій] // Мала хронологія мистецьких подій і пам'ятних дат ХХ століття: Україна — Світ : локально-індивідуальний дослідницький ракурс : довідник / Р. М. Яців. — Львів, 2021.
- Лупак Т. Феномен самотності у творчості Діонізія Шолдри // Студентський науковий вісник. — Т. : ТНПУ ім. В. Гнатюка, 2008. — Вип. No. 15. — С. 205–210.
- Діозій Шолдра. Малярство : каталог виставки 17 лют. — 31 берез. 1995 р. / Терноп. обл. художній музей ; авт.-упоряд. І. Дуда. — Тернопіль : Лілея, 1995. — 28 с. : іл.
- Живопис. Скульптура. Каталог музейної збірки. Частина І. — Тернопіль, Астон, 2007. — С. 118.
- Діонізій Шолдра. Малярство / Тернопільський обл. худож. музей ; текст, упоряд., ред. І. Дуда ; фото Р. Макогін. — Тернопіль : Шабала Ю. Є., 2015. — 16 листівок.
- Горловиця О. Маляр неба і дерев // Свобода. — 2015. — No. 88 (13 лист.). — С. 4.
- Золотнюк А. Коли дерева тягнуться увись // Вільне життя плюс. — 2015 . — No. 91 (11 листоп.). — С. 6.
- Кедрин І. Діонізій Шолда — сумні дерева і веселе небо // У межах зацікавлення. — Ню-Йорк ; Париж, 1986. — С. 367–368.
