= Serhiy Nadal =

Ukrainian politician

- Сергій Надал
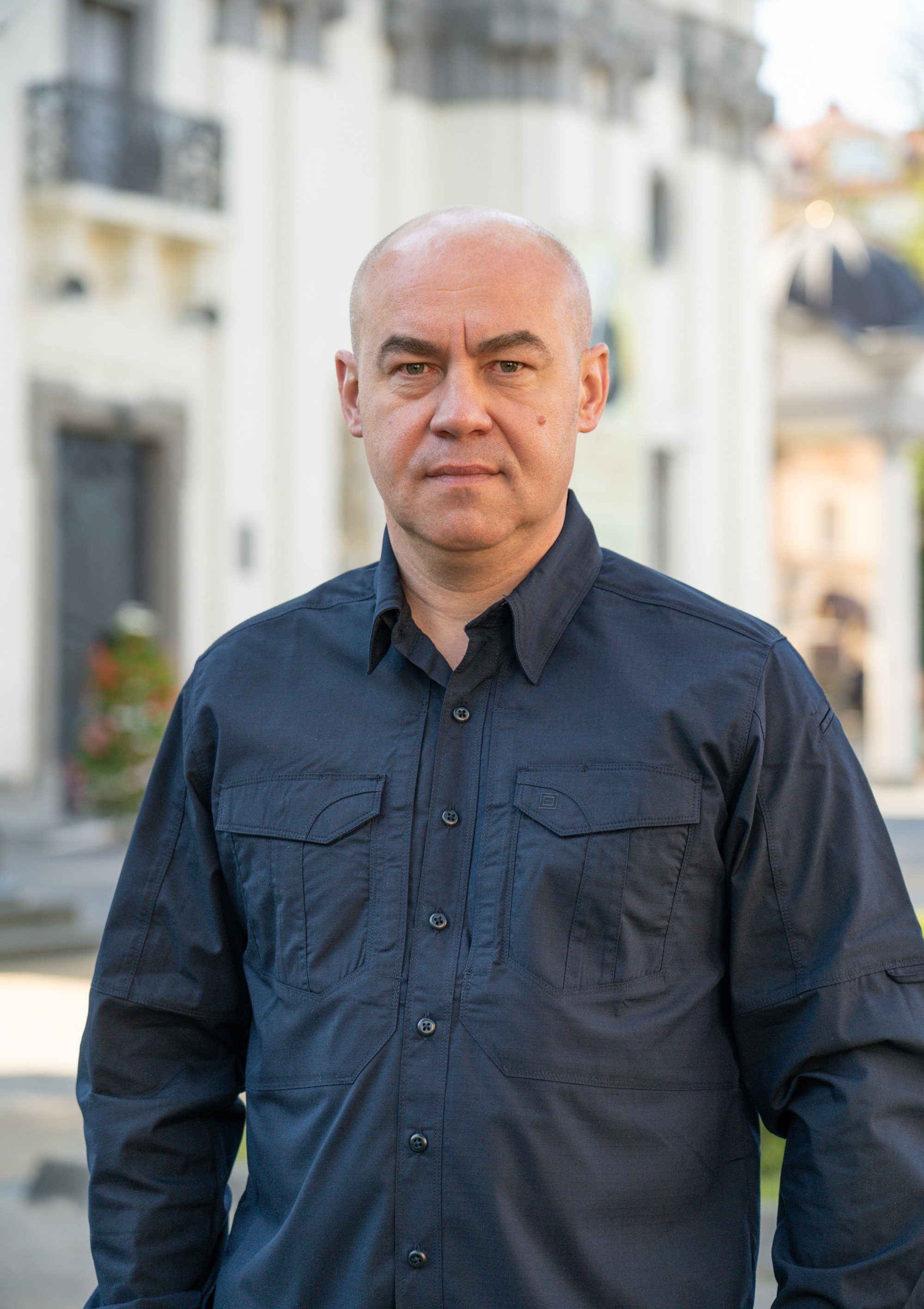
- Nadal in July 2023

Mayor of Ternopil
- Incumbent
- Assumed office 30 November 2010
- Preceded by: Roman Zastawny

Personal details
- Born: 1 January 1975 (age 51) Tarnopol, Ukrainian SSR, Soviet Union (now Ternopil, Ukraine)
- Party: Svoboda
- Spouse: Elena
- Children: Anastasiya
- Education: Ternopil Commercial Institute
- Website: www.nadal.te.ua

Serhiy Vitaliiovych Nadal (Ukrainian: Сергій Віталійович Надал; born 1 January 1975) is a Ukrainian politician who is the mayor of Ternopil and the head of the Ternopil urban hromada in western Ukraine. A member of the Svoboda party, Nadal has been mayor since November 2010. Nadal's 2010 election was the first mayoral election won by Svoboda.

== Early life and education ==
Nadal was born on January 1, 1975, in the city of Ternopil. In 1991, he graduated from Ternopil Secondary School No. 17. From 1991, he studied at the Ternopil Commercial Institute, graduating in 1995 with a degree in economics and production management. In 1994, while still a student, he began working at the local tax office. He started as a tax inspector and became the head of a department at the State Tax Administration, a position he held until 2005. He also led a division from 2005 to 2007. In 1997, he graduated from the Ternopil Academy of National Economy with a degree in accounting and auditing. In 2001, he completed his studies at the West Ukrainian National University with a degree in finance. From July 2007 to April 2010, he served as the First Deputy Head of the State Tax Administration in Ternopil Oblast. He was awarded the rank of first-class tax service advisor. From April 2010 to July 2010, he worked as the head of the Starokostiantyniv State Tax Inspectorate in Khmelnytskyi Oblast.

== Awards and decorations ==
In 2011, he was awarded the Order of Saint Equal-to-the-Apostles Prince Volodymyr the Great, III degree 2011. In 2017 Serhiy Nadal received the Honorary Diploma of the Cabinet of Ministers of Ukraine.

In 2018, he received the 3 grade Order of Merit, followed by the Honorary Diploma of the Verkhovna Rada in 2019. He was also honored as a distinguished economist of Ukraine in 2021.

In 2022, he received an official commendation from the Homeland defense of the Armed Forces of Ukraine and was recognized with a commendation from the Main Intelligence Directorate For Merit to the HUR in 2023 and 2024.

== Career ==
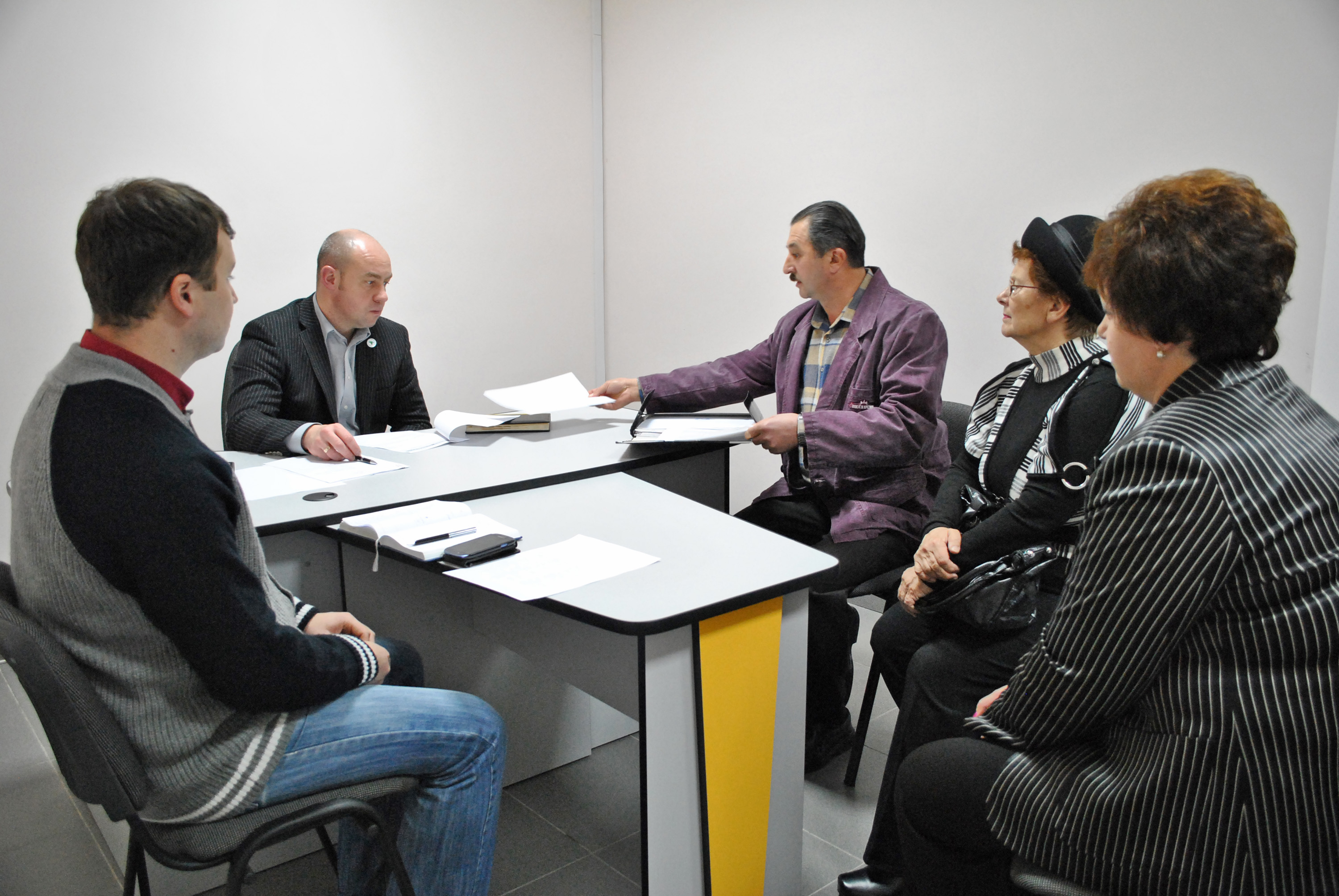
Nadal at work in 2014

Nadal is a board member of the political party All-Ukrainian Union "Svoboda" and serves as the head of the Ternopil City Organization of the same party. On March 15, 2009, he was elected as a deputy of the Ternopil Regional Council, representing the Svoboda faction. On October 31, 2010, he was elected Mayor of Ternopil and assumed office on November 30, 2010.

In the 2015 local elections, Nadal won in the first round with the support of over 60% of Ternopil voters, securing his position as mayor for a second term.

In the 2020 local elections, he ran for mayor of Ternopil once again and was re-elected for a third term with 74.59% of the vote.

As mayor of Ternopil, Nadal initiated a large-scale restoration of courtyards in multi-story residential buildings and revived international motorboat racing competitions in Ternopil. In 2017, he introduced an electronic cashless payment system for public transportation. Nadal also initiated an international scientific conference to refute communist fabrications and restore the Hero of Ukraine titles for Stepan Bandera and Yevhen Konovalets.

In 2021, he established a commission to inspect shelters, and in 2022, he initiated the creation of an interactive map of Ternopil's protective structures. He also launched support programs for the families of fallen soldiers and created a registry of aid to the Armed Forces of Ukraine.

== Public activity ==
Nadal heads the Ternopil Regional Public Organization "Ukrainians Helping Ukrainians." He leads the Ternopil Regional Branch of the Association of Ukrainian Cities and chairs its Budget Committee. Nadal is the Honorary President and a board member of the Wrestling Federation of Ternopil Region. He founded the NGO Federation of Hockey of Ternopil Region and is a board member of the NGO Ternopil Science Center. He established the charitable organization "Generations Unity Foundation" (Єднання поколінь) and heads the public organization "Fund for the Development of Ternopil City named after Volodymyr Luchakovsky."

Nadal is a member of the Supervisory Board of West Ukrainian National University, as well as the Supervisory Board of Ternopil Medical University. He also serves on the editorial board of the three-volume encyclopedic publication "Ternopil Region. History of Cities and Villages."
