= Jacques Oudin =

French politician (1939–2020)

- Jacques Mirko Oudin
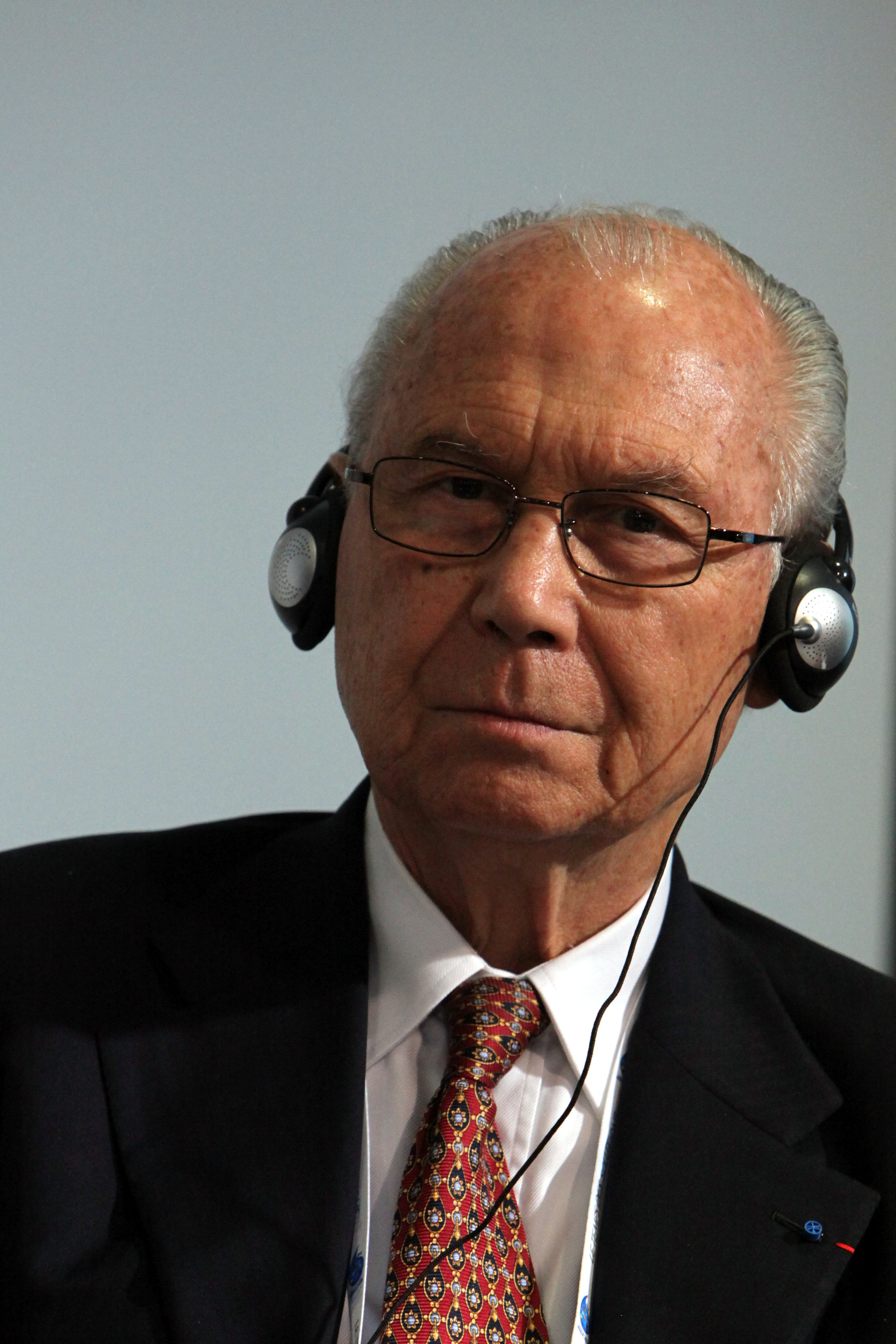
- Jacques Oudin at the 6th World Water Forum (2012).

Member of the French Senate for Vendée
- In office 2 October 1986 – 30 September 2004

Personal details
- Born: 7 October 1939 Tourane, Protectorate of Annam (present-day Đà Nẵng, Vietnam)
- Died: 21 March 2020 (aged 80) Paris, France
- Cause of death: COVID-19
- Party: RPR; UMP
- Education: HEC Paris; Sciences Po; ÉNA

Jacques Mirko Oudin (7 October 1939 – 21 March 2020) was a French politician.

== Biography ==
Jacques' parents are Jean Oudin, ambassador of France, and Sophie Yablonska-Oudin, Ukrainian travel writer and photographer. Jacques was born on 7 October 1939, in Da Nang, when his father served in French diplomatic corps.

Jacques Oudin was member of the Senate of France from 1986 to 2004, representing the department of Vendée.

Died in France, on 21 March 2020 (at the age of 80) from COVID-19.

Jacques Oudin is a graduate of HEC Paris, Sciences Po and ENA.

== Honors ==
- Knight of Legion of Honour
- Officer of Ordre national du Mérite (2009)
- Knight of Order of Agricultural Merit
- Knight of Ordre des Palmes académiques
