= Radio-electronic industry in Ukraine =

Radio-electronic industry is a part of the machine-building industry, which in planning has been classified since 1968 separately from the radio industry, electronic industry, and the subdivision of instrument making. In the official reporting statistics license applications are submitted only in the categories of "devices, means of automation and computer technology" and "radio receivers, radios, TVs and household recorders", which does not cover all products.

By methods of calculating national income, radio-electronic industry in 1969 gave the Ukrainian Soviet Socialist Republic around 1.9% of the products of all aggression. In reality, it was likely more than this. The radio-electronic industry rarely produces finished products; as most of its products are components of others. The end products, as well as the parts, and the semi-finished products went into the following: rockets, artificial satellites, nuclear power plants, etc. An important component of their products, polymer batteries require many strategically important and scarce metals, plastics, minerals, and synthetics. Because of this, they are closely connected with many other industries.

According to the organization of production, technology and communications to the mining industry, the following branches of industry are fully or at least partly involved: radio engineering, telephone and telegraph, the industry of special (largely military) radio and radio navigation equipment, cybernetic, electronic computing and guiding machines (computers) and electronic automation equipment. This is an industry that manufactures electronic machines for boot control of production processes, office work, control and accounting, planning and commercial and financial operations, machines for school education, for photographic reproduction of documents, storage, and finding of information. Further in the industry of measuring equipment is the electronic vacuum, technological equipment, conductors, radio components, materials for radio-electronic industry (produces electrical engineering, glass, special ceramics, pie, mica, luminophore, etc.) and special engineering for the radio-electronic industry.

== Radio-electronic industry in Ukraine ==
In Ukraine, the radio-electronic industry is a subject that is only relevant to union ministries. It is the youngest branch of the industry both in Ukraine and in the world, but its significance is huge, and will soon be decisive for the entire national economy in the near future because the electronics industry becomes the core of all machine building. In radio-electronic industry, the beginnings of agricultural production were in 1896, when in the Sumy the Belgians built machine-building workshops, which were made among others, telephone and telegraph devices. The first radiotelegraph laboratory was opened in Kyiv by S. Eisenstein in 1905, the first radio station was built in Mylokaiv in 1914. The first electrostatic generators and accelerators of protons in the USSR were created in the 1930s. In the Ukrainian Physical-Technical Institute in Kharkiv, television has existed since 1940 (in an experimental form). The radio industry has developed mainly in Ukraine since 1945. In Dnipropetrovsk, the mass production of radio receivers began in 1947, the radio station - in 1952; tape recorders began to be produced in Kyiv since 1949, TV sets - in Lviv since 1958. The electronics industry was created mainly in the 1960s pp. The Lviv factory of kinescopes began mass production of television rods in 1954 and soon became an enterprise of the all-Union and Eastern European significance; In 1968, he began to produce rods for color TV.

The first computer in the USSR was built in Kyiv in 1950; the mass production of computers "Kiev" began here in 1959, the leading electronic machine "Dnipro" - in 1961, an electronic machine for engineering calculations "Promin" - 1962. Sumy factory of electronic microscopes and automatic machines for the chemical industry became in operation in 1959. Severodonetsk Instrument-Making Plant began to produce computers and others. electronic devices since 1967. Production of the radio industry in Ukraine has increased in 1959 - 69 in 8 times, electronic industry in 16 times (incomplete data). The Kyiv factory "Tochelectroprylad" (1938) began mass production of various electrical measuring instruments, potentiometers, and magnetometers in the 1950s pp. Other Head Control devices were built in Kharkiv (two), Odessa, Lviv (Teplokontrol,) Zhytomyr ("Electric meter",) Ivano-Frankivsk (instrumentation.) There are also smaller ones. Rivne provinces in Cherkasy, Lubny, Mukachevo, Lutsk, Luhansk, and others. In 1963 there were 14 enterprises of instrument making in the Ukrainian SSR, now - 18, not counting specialized military. Radio electronic products are produced by many other multi-factory plants.

Radio-electronic industry - labor-intensive and material-intensive industry that does not require much metal and energy. Instead, it needs a large base, experimental laboratories, and highly skilled engineering personnel. According to the 1966 data, the electronic industry was concentrated mainly in the Southwest Economic Region (Kyiv, Lviv). It produced 78% of electric meters and 76% of devices for control and regulation of technological processes of all products of Ukraine.

Return on assets and productivity were higher here than in Ukraine, and in Ukraine were higher than in the whole of the USSR. The development of the electronic industry in the Ukrainian Soviet Socialist Republic, the RSFSR and the USSR is presented in Table. It shows that in Ukraine the electronic industry grew annually by 19.5%, in the RSFSR - by 13.8%, in the USSR - by 15.7%, that is, faster than the entire industry of the USSR and the USSR developed.

Radio electronics industry in Ukraine is now at the level of the electronic industry of Czechoslovakia and East Germany, that is, it belongs to the most advanced branches in the whole block, however, compared to the West, it lags behind. In 1969, only 74 computers were installed in Ukraine, more than 300 in West Germany, and even more than 500 in France. According to Western approximate data, the USSR now produces 500 to 600 computers per year, and America has 15,000. Under the plan for 1975, the USSR should produce no more than 2,000 computers. A small number of large computers that the USSR uses to study space and troops.

Cases were completed singly, and those small computers that are now in mass production in Ukraine and the USSR are copies of Western cars, the production of which in the West was suspended back in 1962. According to official figures, in 1972 only 65% of the products of the electronic industry of the USSR corresponded to the world-class technology. Many products of the electronics industry of the USSR are currently imported from Japan, England, France, Italy, Switzerland, and Denmark, as well as from all countries of Eastern Europe. In 1989, electronics was suddenly exposed to imports from Asia, which domestic producers could not cope with and were subsequently squeezed out of the market. In addition, illegal imports further aggravated an already difficult situation. For example, in Poland, domestic companies’ sales in the sector almost halved in a year, falling from $725 million in 1990 to $480 million in 1991

Production of devices, automation and computer facilities Million cb. *
Years	Ukraine	RSFSR	The USSR	Ukraine's share in the USSR
1967	452	1843	2739	16,50 %
1969	518	1575	2562	20,21 %
1970	613	1861	3092	19,82 %
1971	800	2090	3500	20,56 %

- Data for 1967 - at prices 1955; 1969 - 71 - at prices in 1967, though this is not certain. Permanent prices in 1967 are lower than constant prices in 1955, in terms of gas prices by 35%.

The main reasons for the lagging of the electronic media, in addition to technology, are low depreciation rates and the lack of some strategic materials: ferrites, piezobarbes, selenium, indium.
