= Bohdan Levkiv =

Ukrainian politician (1950–2021)

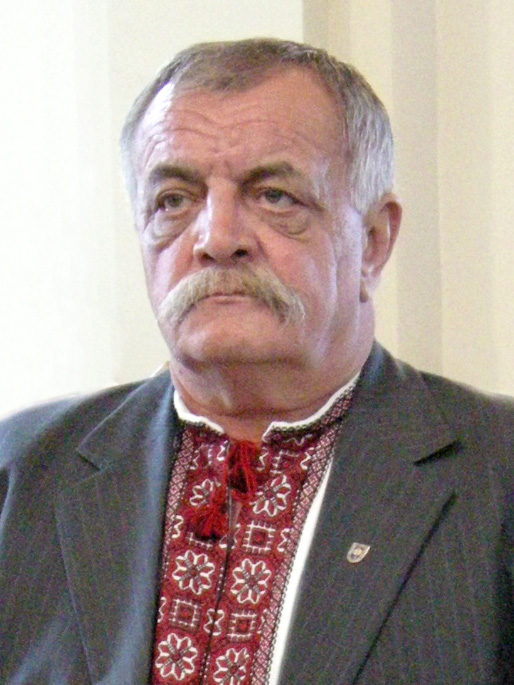
- Levkiv in 2007

Mayor of Ternopil
- In office 2002–2006
- Preceded by: Anatoliy Kucherenko
- Succeeded by: Roman Zastavnyi

Personal details
- Born: 22 February 1950 Ternopil, Ukrainian SSR, Soviet Union
- Died: 25 November 2021 (aged 71) Ternopil, Ukraine

Bohdan Levkiv (Ukrainian: Левків Богдан Євгенович; 22 February 1950 – 25 November 2021) was a Ukrainian politician. He served as mayor of Ternopil from 2002 to 2006.

== Early life ==
Levkiv was born on 22 February 1950 in Ternopil, which was then part of the Ukrainian SSR in the Soviet Union. After graduating from secondary school no. 25 in Ternopil, he attended the Ternopil Higher Vocational School of Services and Tourism. He finally graduated in 1973 from Khmelnytskyi National University.

After graduating, he continued to work within Ternopil. He first worked at the regional household department as first a chief engineer and then later head of the production and technical department until 1987. In 1987, he was appointed Head of the Quality Department of the Center for Standardization and Metrology, which he did until 1990. For a year afterward he was chief inspector of control over compliance and instructor of the organizational departments within the city. According to his obituary, he was a leading advocate for the independence of Ukraine from the Soviet Union in the 1980s to the early 1990s. After the collapse of the Soviet Union, he became the Director of Remobuche LLC until 1998.

== Political career ==
In 1994, he entered the Ternopil City Council. In 1998, he was appointed Secretary of the Ternopil City Council, a position he served in for four years until he became Mayor of Ternopil. He was mayor from April 2002 to 2006. During this time, he headed the regional branch for Ternopil of the Association of Ukrainian Cities.

He remained active in the local political scene therefore, running for the Ternopil Regional Council in 2009 and 2010 under the Yulia Tymoshenko Bloc and the Conscience of Ukraine parties respectively.

== Personal life ==
Bohdan Levkiv died on 25 November 2021, at the age of 71.

== See also ==
- List of mayors of Ternopil
