= Ternopil Pond =

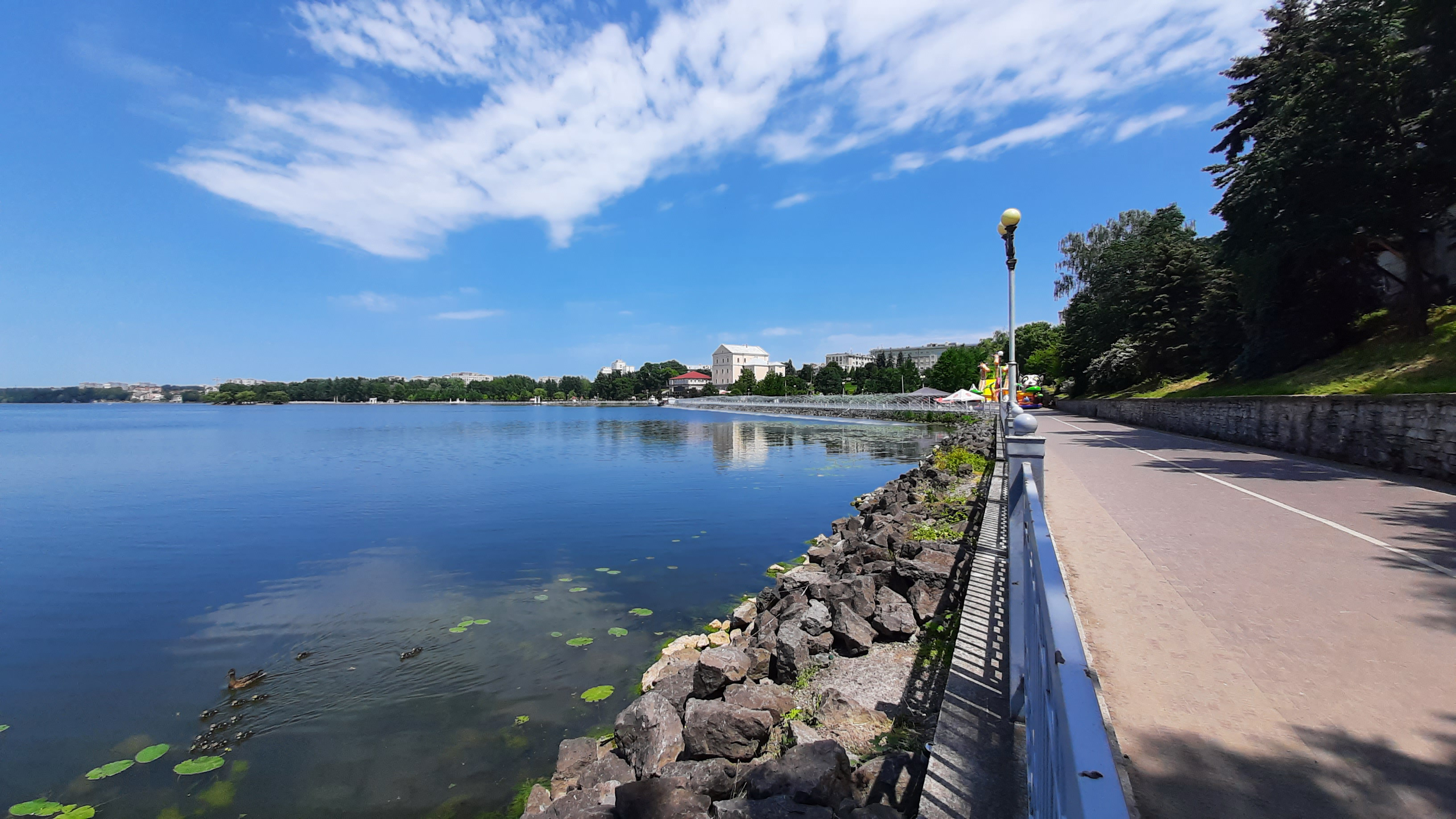
- View of the pond

- Location within Ternopil Oblast
- Interactive map of Ternopil Pond
- Location: Ternopil, Ternopil Oblast
- Coordinates: 49°33′52″N 25°34′51″E
- Type: Reservoir (Pond)
- Basin countries: Ukraine
- Built: 1548
- Max. length: 3.5 km (2.2 mi)
- Surface area: 289 ha (710 acres)
- Islands: 2: the Island of Love and "The Seagull"
- Settlements: Ternopil

Ternopil Pond (Ukrainian: Тернопільський став, known as Komsomol Pond before 1992) is a large artificial pond, a reservoir in the center of Ternopil, created in the place of swamps on the river Seret. Today, the pond is surrounded by a park. It is a favorite walking place of residents and visitors of the city. Only two European cities have a lake in the center, and one of them is Ternopil. The festival of forge art takes place on the embankment of the pond. The Church of Exaltation of the Cross, an architectural monument from the 16th century, is situated near the pond.

== History ==
It was created in 1548 by Crown Hetman Jan Tarnowski as one link in a chain of fortifications encircling his residence, the Tarnopol Castle. In the 16th century, the pond stretched for 7 kilometres (4.3 mi) up to the high dam carrying the highway to Lwów. At the beginning of the 20th century, the pond was leased by Ternopil businessman Volodymyr Trach, who exported fish to Poland.

In addition, it was also used for fish breeding. The pond, formerly renowned for its fisheries, had silted up by the mid-20th century, and was further damaged during the Second World War. During the Second World War, Ternopil Pond was completely destroyed. It was reconstructed and expanded in 1952 to include a network of marshes bordering the Seret River during the massive rebuilding of Ternopil. At that time, it was decided to transfer the water resources to the local authorities in 1956, which began to recover the pond. A new dam was built resulting in a higher water level than before. The mended pond had taken a much larger area - more than 300 hectares, and was subsequently named as Komsomol Pond. Shevchenko Park was established between the pond and the city center in 1953, which stretched along the eastern shores of the lake. In the 1960s, the beach near the Old Castle was eliminated, and in its place, a central pier was built. A local version of the Jet d'Eau was inaugurated in 1975. In the 1980s the landscaping around the Komsomolsk Pond continued to be developed. A hydropark "Pioneer" behind the dam was created, which later was renamed as "Topilche." Hotel "Moscow" was also built at the foot of the Forest Park "Zahrebellia". Subsequently, the hotel's name was changed to "Halychyna". Also, Ternopil Pond has two islands: the Island of Love and "The Seagull" (“Chaika”).

An old Soviet motor ship, named "Yan Amor Tarnovskyi" still operates on the pond. In 1968, the ship arrived in Ternopil, and was initially named "The Hero Tantsorov", in honor of Gregory Tantsorov, one of the liberators of the city from German occupation. The ship was originally called "Zalishchyky", and was built in 1963 in Belarus. An overhaul of "The Hero Tantsorov" was conducted in 2006. In 1966, a small motor ship "PT-50", built in 1964, appeared on the pond ("Passenger ship - Fifty Project"). In 2005, the two ships were passed to the ownership of municipal enterprise “Ternopilelektrotrans”.

The pond has significant economic importance in the 21st century, operating four mills that bring profits to the city. There are many fish in the lake such as pike, perch, carp, and others. There are also a lot of algae and the yellow water lily that blooms in late June. To the west of the pond, near the village Proniatyn, various types of willows are existent. Also, wild ducks and gulls swim and breed in Ternopil pond.

== Photogallery ==
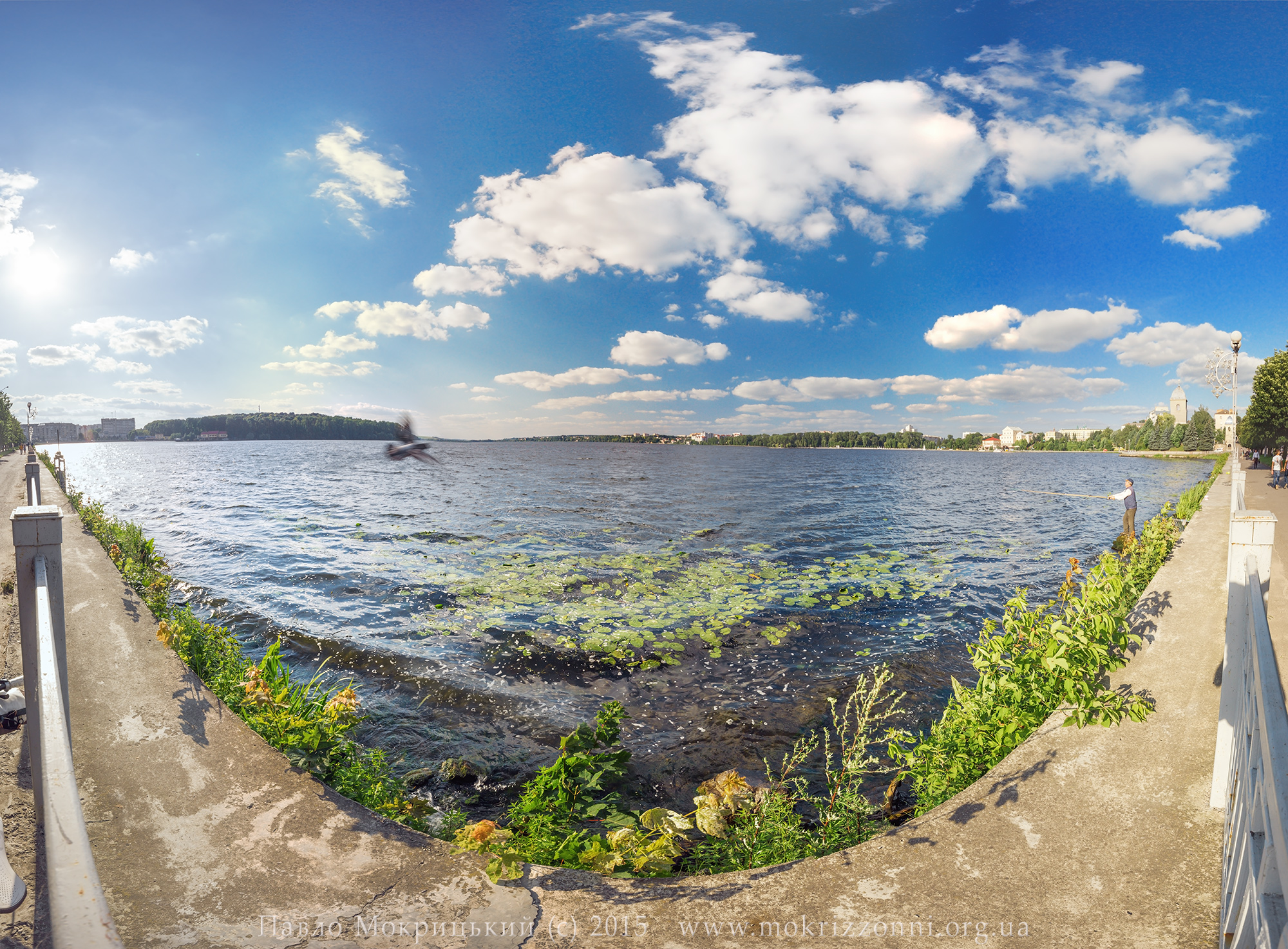
Ternopil lake

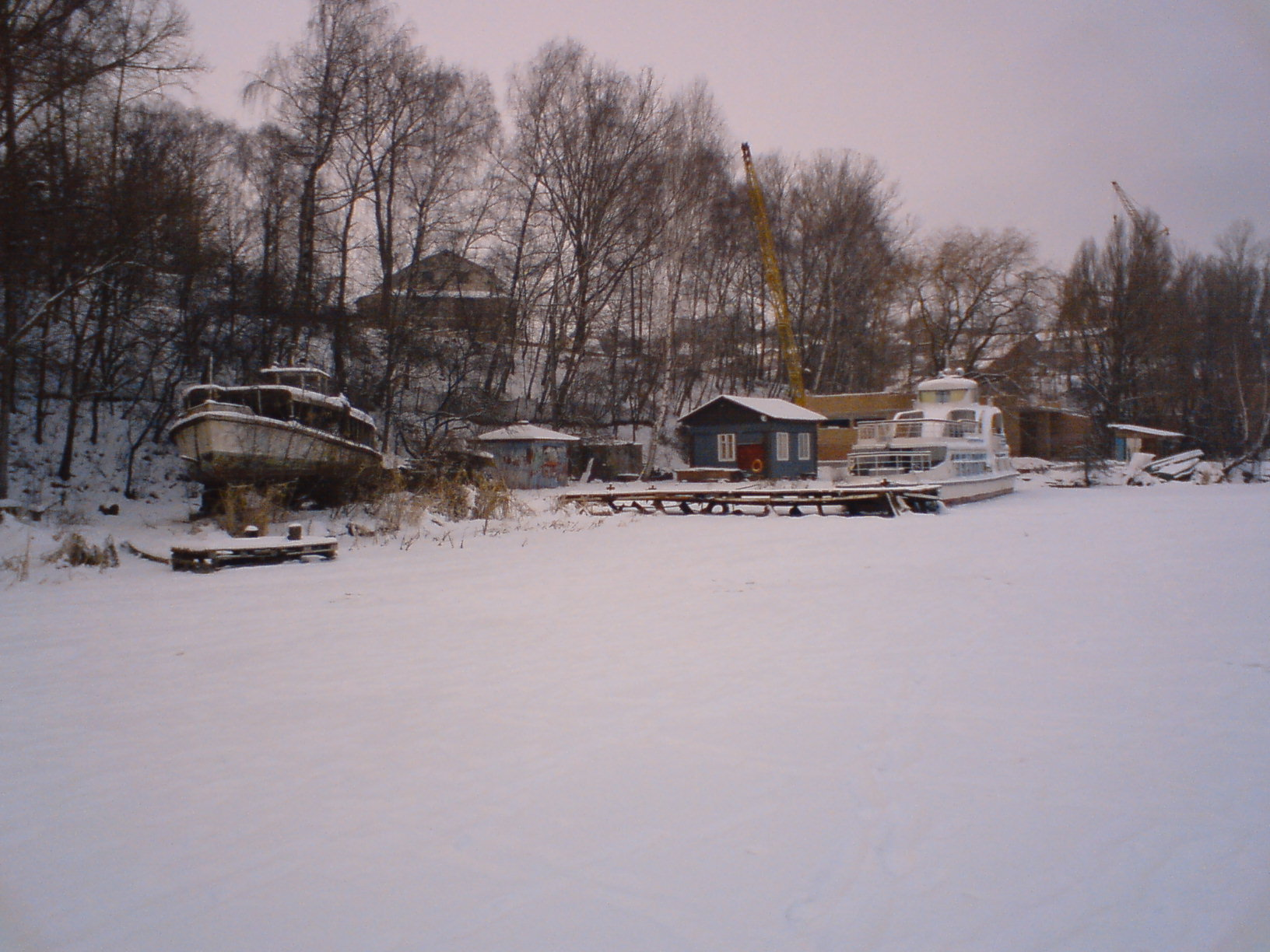
Cruise boat base, 2009

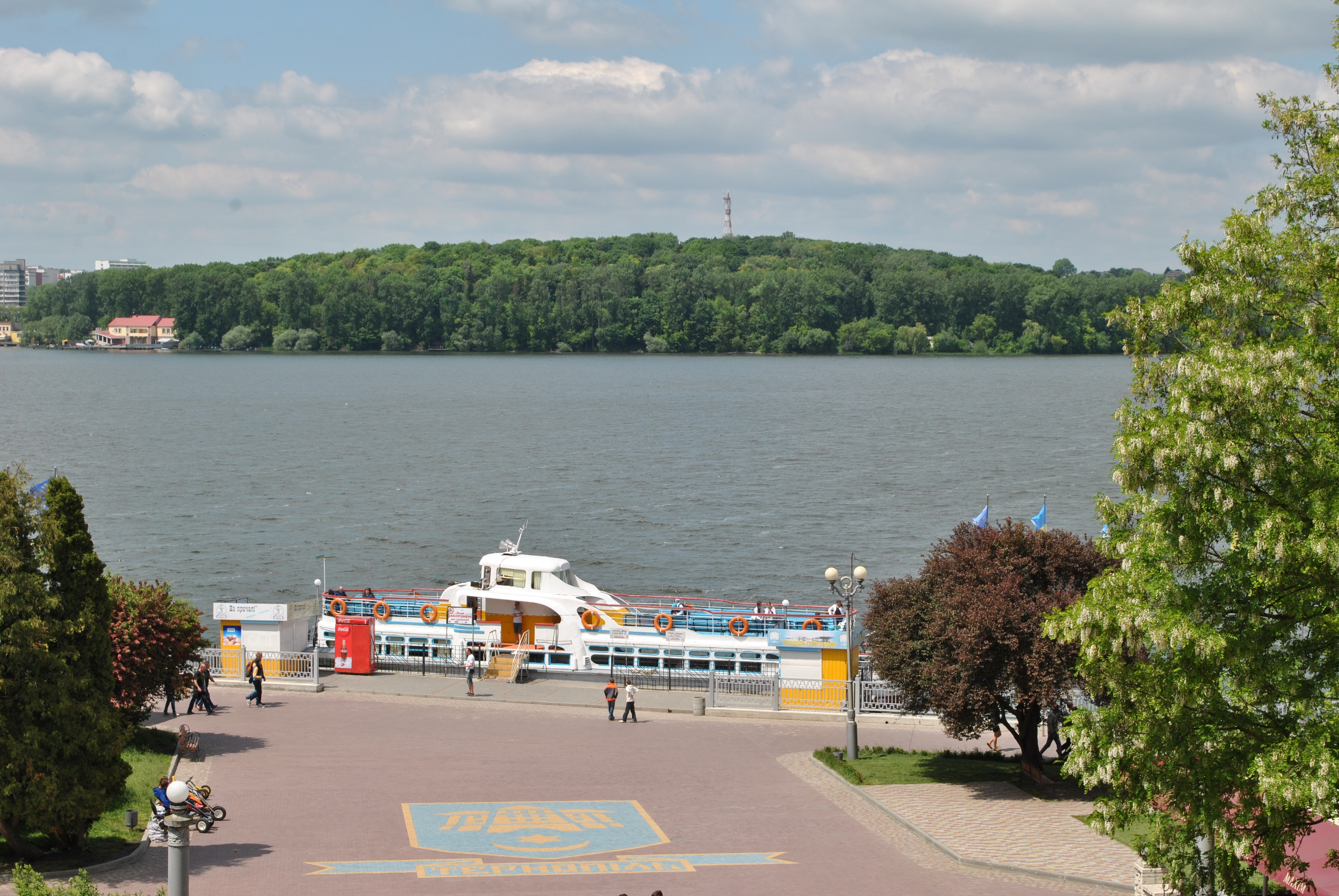
Motor Ship "The Hero Tantsorov" on Pier

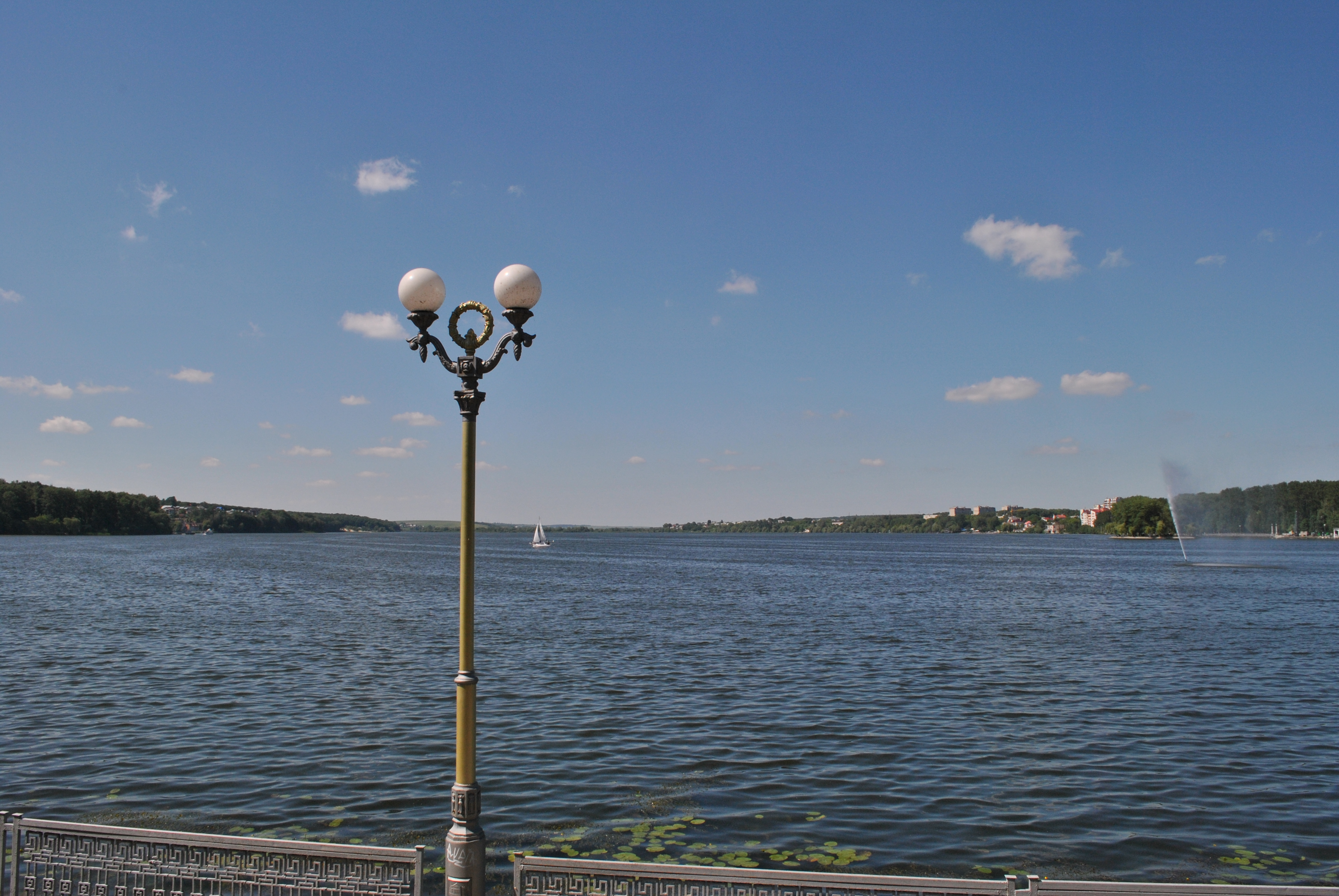
View on the lake

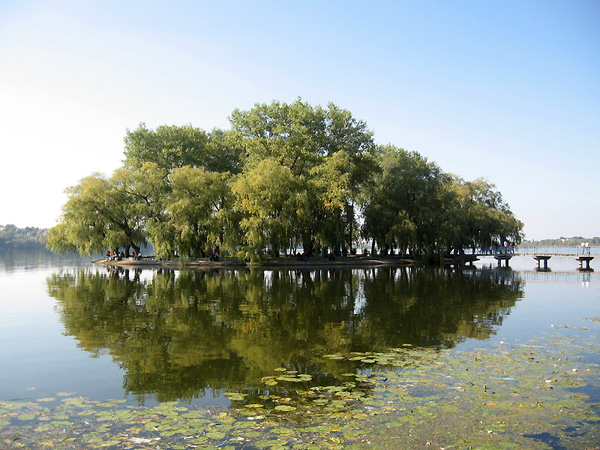
Island of Love on the Ternopil lake

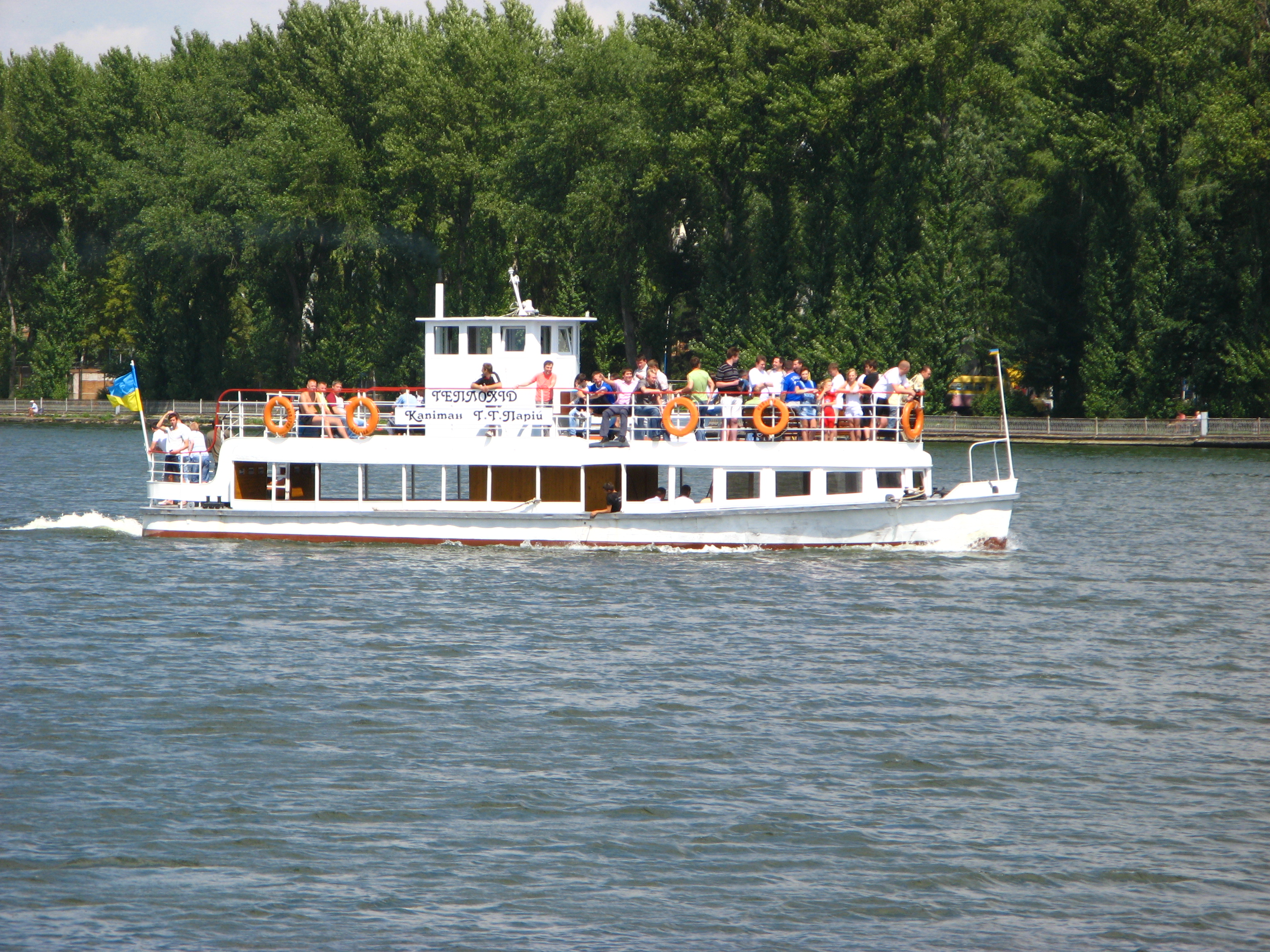
Motor Ship "Kapitan T. G. Pariy"

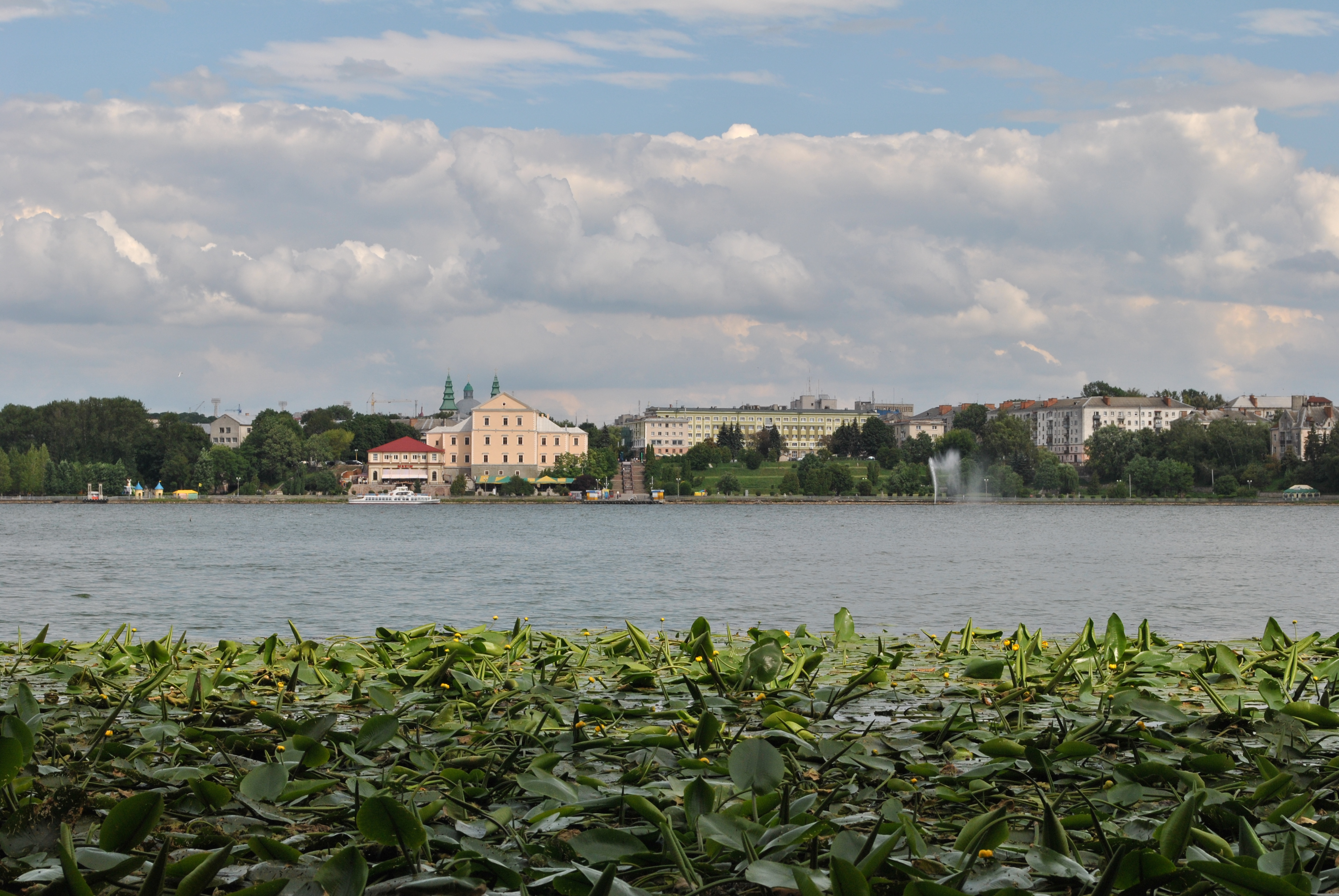
Ternopil Castle

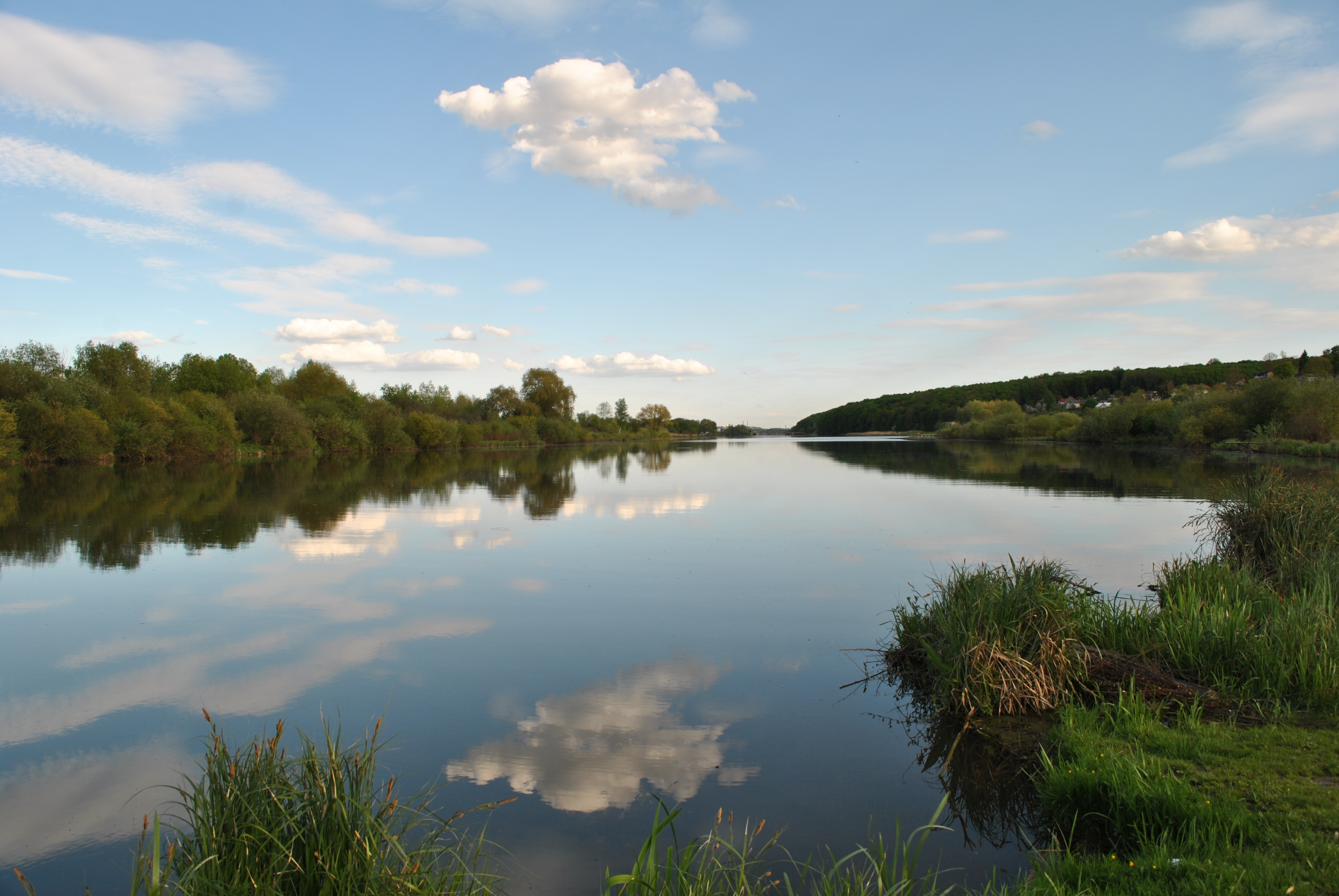
Boats canal

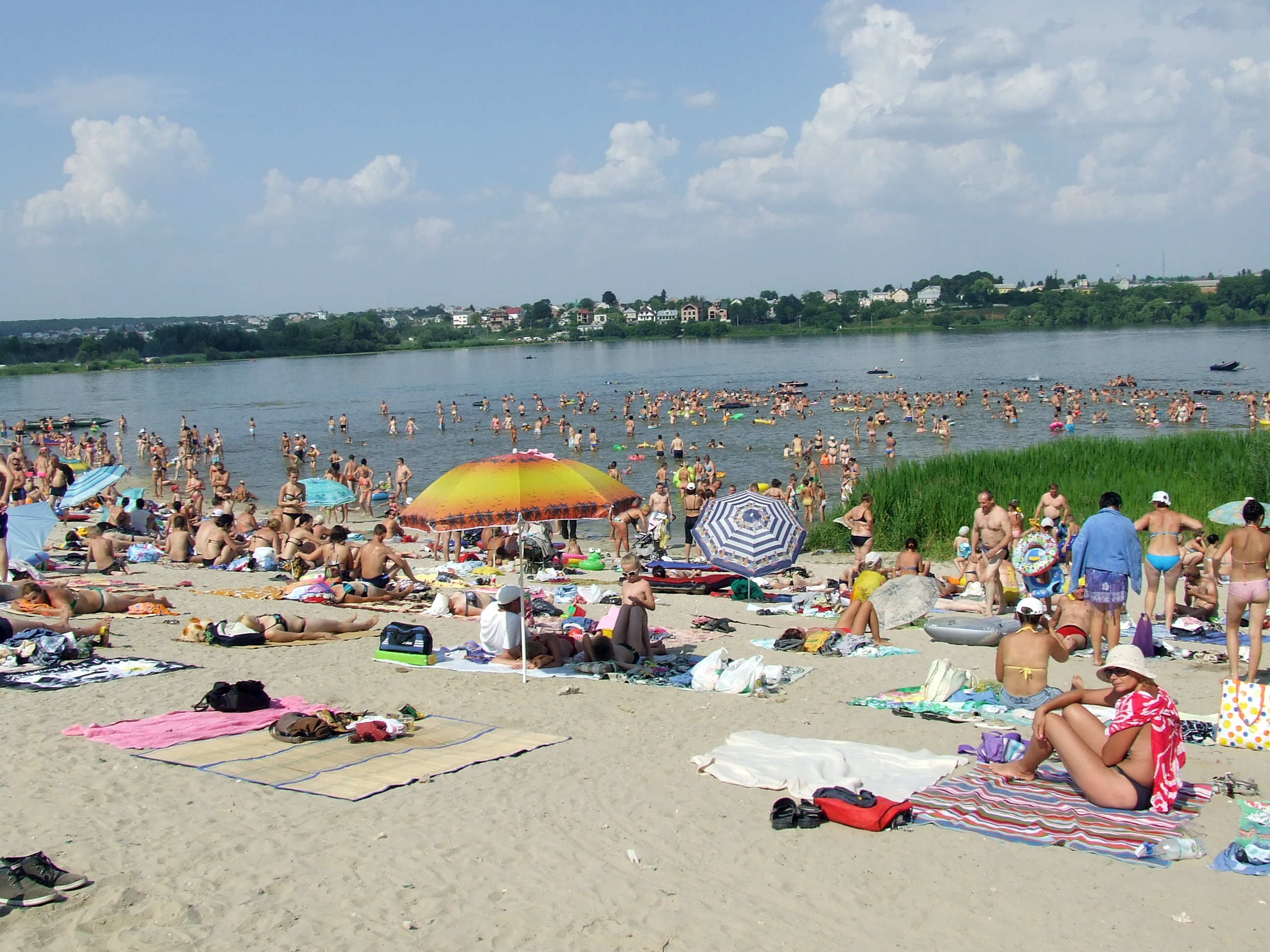
Beach

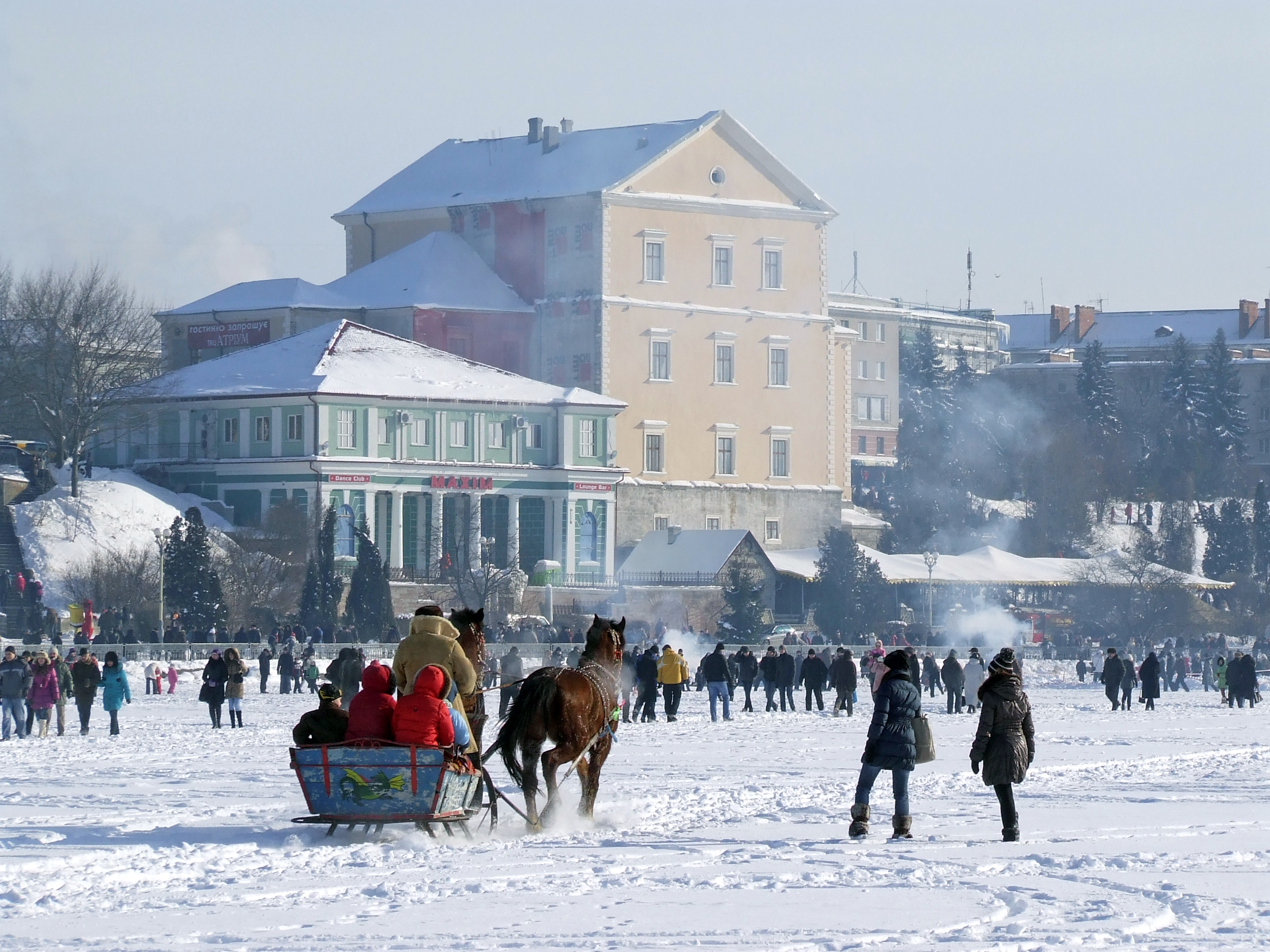
Winter
