= Ternopil Castle =

Castle in Ternopil, Ukraine

- Ternopil, Ternopil Oblast
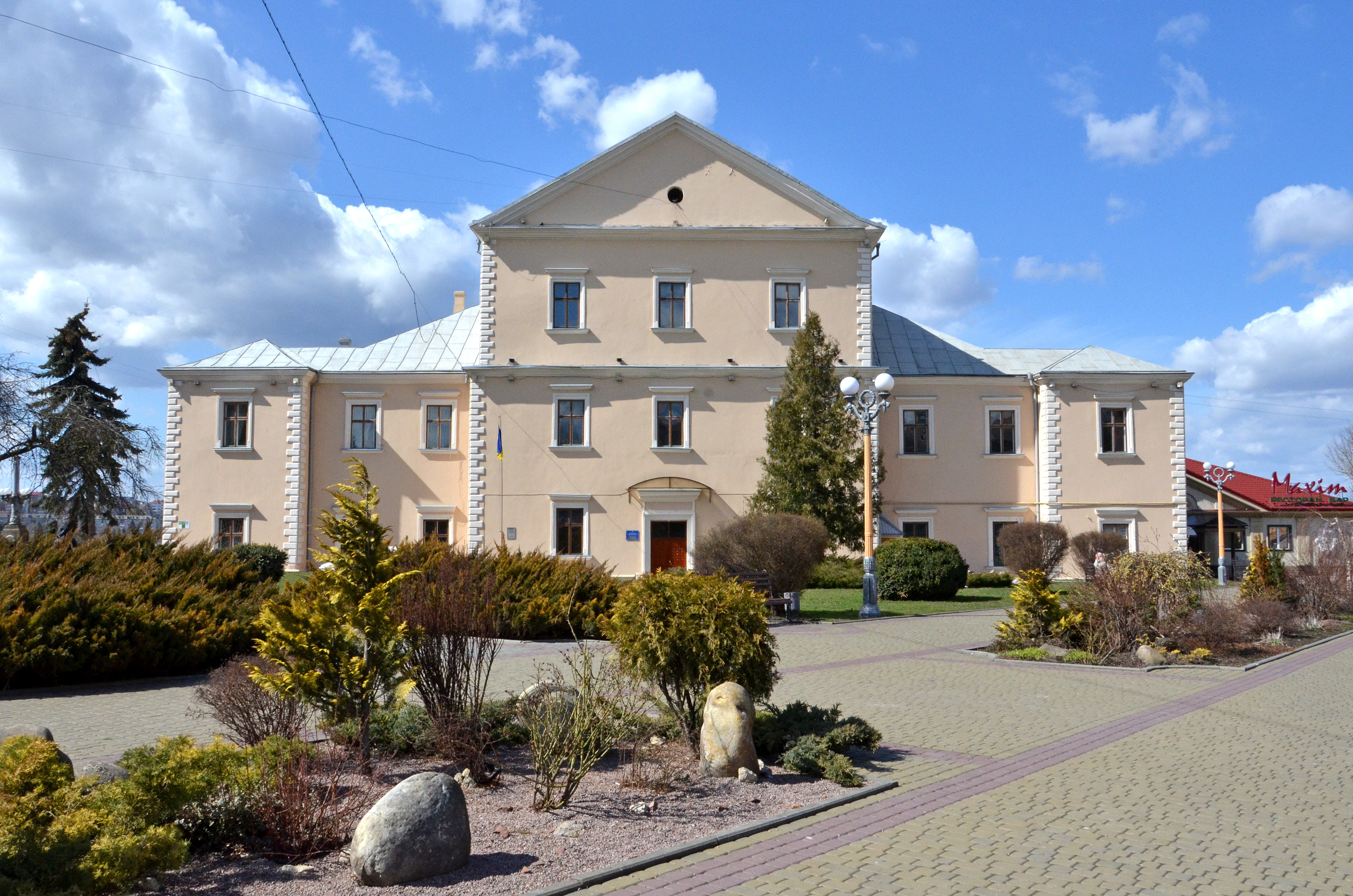

Site information
- Owner: Ukrainian State
- Condition: continuous renovations

Location
- Coordinates: 49°33′12″N 25°35′16″E

Site history
- Built: 1548
- Demolished: 1575, 1589, 1672, 1917, 1944
- Events: Tatar invasions, Russian Revolution, World War II

Immovable Monument of National Significance of Ukraine
- Official name: Старий замок (мур.) (Old Castle (stone))
- Type: Architecture
- Reference no.: 190031

The Ternopil Castle (Ukrainian: Тернопільський замок, Polish: Zamek w Tarnopolu) is a stronghold which gave birth to the city of Ternopil. It was built in the 16th century to protect the southern border of the Kingdom of Poland and the Polish–Lithuanian Commonwealth.

The castle originated as the residence of a Polish nobleman, Jan Amor Tarnowski, in 1540. Construction works (1540–1548) on the marshy bank of the Seret River were authorized by King Sigismund the Old. The castle, around which the modern town has developed, was encircled by a wooden fence and a deep moat. The latter was connected in 1548 to the castle pond (see Ternopil Pond).

== History ==
=== Construction ===
King Sigismund granted land ownership and rights erecting the castle to the great Polish Crown Hetman, Jan Tarnowski. Concurrently in the valley of Seret river a levee and dam with a bridge crossing were constructed, resulting in the stream pooling, thus filling a new lake. Out from the north the castle and the city was protected by the Rudka river harboring a boggy holm, while on the southern side would be Bavorovsky pond which vanished in a later time. A narrow, dry strip of land factually being a moat banked by a mound with inside masonry reinforced with an oak stockade would set the castle ground apart. Rectangular-shaped towers housing embrasures stood tall on the outer fringes. The entrance was permitted from the east via stone gatehouse secured with a chain hoist drawbridge.

The principal castle building represented by the residential palace, due to natural fortress placing, possessed varied floor levels: besides three main floors visible from the city outskirts, two underground levels being revealed out of a lake steep bank altogether with the two rows of embrasures.

The first record in Ternopil's annals entered on April 15, 1540 was related to the king's ascent given to Kraków nobleman Jan Tarnowski regarding constructing the castle over the Seret river. This fortification had to seal nomad advancement through the wide plains from Terebovlya (then known as Trembowla) to Busk. At the same time the natural terrain of the environment would permit security provisions for a given locale.

Castle construction lasted for 8 years and completed in 1548. Perquisites of 1566 mention Ternopil's fortress and its founder. Due to significant losses sustained on construction project, the city was relieved of much of the taxation burden. Consequently, the castle was reinforced and upgraded by Tarnowski's son, Krzysztof. Sizable expense was credited towards enlargement and improvement by Tomasz Zamoyski, who received the city as his wife's dowry, daughter of renowned Ruthenian maecenas and statesman, Konstanty Ostrogski.

In the early 17th century, Ternopil, known then as Tarnopol, passed through inheritance in the female line to Tomasz Zamoyski who commissioned extensive renovations. It was besieged by the Turks in 1544, 1575, 1589 and 1672. The Ottoman army under Şişman İbrahim Paşa reduced the castle to ruins in 1675. Count Korytowski revived it in the 1840s as his summer residence; he also had its towers, walls and other fortifications dismantled.

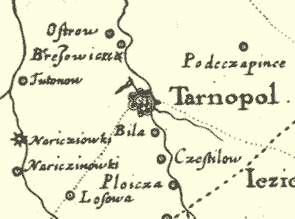
16th century map of Ternopil Castle location

=== Tatar invasion ===
In the course of its history Ternopil Castle was a subject of frequent attacks and destruction.

No sooner development projects began, as Tatars attempted inroads on the city. Owing to the town home guard spearheaded by Bernard Pretwicz, Jan Gerburt, and Prokyp Sieniawski, the horde was held back until a force of knights arrived from the vicinity of Sandomierz. The castle sustained significant damage in 1575, 1589, and 1672. In 1675 Şişman İbrahim Paşa broke a camp next to Ternopil and besieged the city.

As Tatars and Turks committed assaults, town dwellers sought refuge in the castle cellars accommodated to withstand prolonged confrontation. A network of underground passageways connected the bulwark with Nadstavna, Serrednya to Monastirska churches, Dominikan, and Jesuit cathedral and synagogues. Underground networks event possible from under the lake to Zagrebelia.

In 1621 Tomasz Zamoyski, the castle owner, completed restoration and entertained prince Władysław IV Vasa. Knowledge about the castle, town, and the vicinity became available from the journal of German explorer and traveler, Ulrich von Werdum, who used to traverse the countryside near Ternopil between July 1671 and January 1672. In 1675 Turks burned the outpost, destroyed fortifications, blew up both towers that have never been rebuilt anew. The castle was reconstructed at the end of the 17th century and the beginning of the 18th.

=== 19th century ===
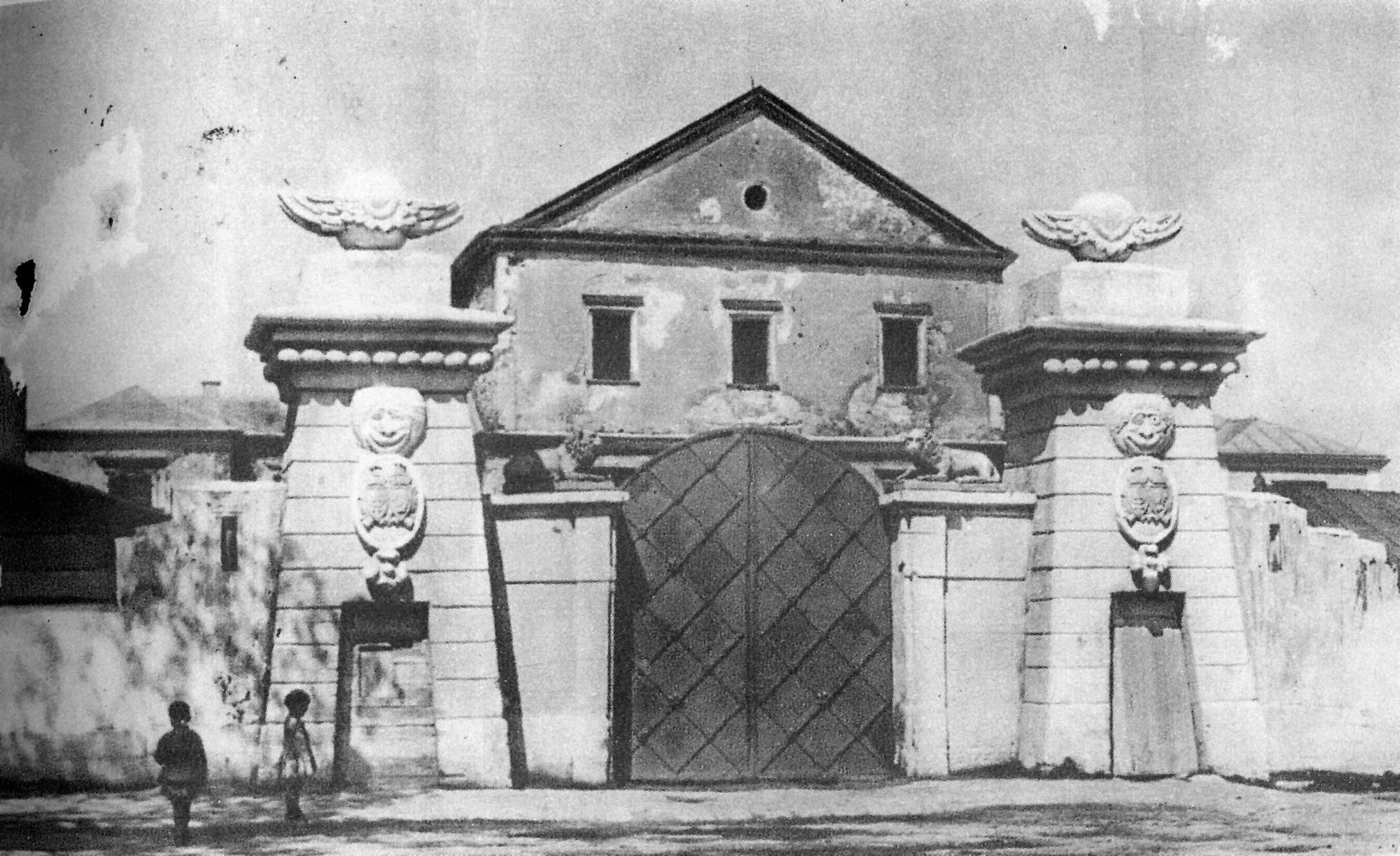
19th century Ternopil Castle outlook

In 1810 Russians accommodated the castle to a "dance casino", where Mayor Tails would arrange societarian receptions. At the beginning of the 19th century, Count Korytowski rebuilt the structure into a palace having demolished defense bulwarks, towers, and gates while raising masonry walls instead. On the southern perimeter the three-story New Castle was constructed, a new Gate House was erected incorporating narrow wicket-gate and two masonry pylons. In 1843 the last owner of Ternopil City, Turkul, sold the castle to the town community that in turn was transferred to the Austrian army having utilized it for barracks.

=== 20th century ===
The Russian army, in their retreat from the city on July 21, 1917, burned the Old Castle. On April 15, 1931 the building was restored anew and a religious blessing ceremony was held. It was occupied by an Officer Cadet Reserve School and a Science Committee of Baborovski that secured a valuable collection of manuscripts and documents. During the Second World War the fort-post was the last defense foothold of the German army as it was being decimated by the advancing Red Army. The ruins of a new castle were cleaned out and on its place the hotel "Ternopil" was built.

=== Restoration ===
The Old Castle was rebuilt in 1956 and then utilized for sporting events held by a regional sports establishment. In 1969 a Greco-Roman School of wrestling had its base there. From original castle what remained was only ground work retained in the form of the foundation with its walls thickness of 2, 5-4, and 5 meters. All the structures as a consequence of many reconstructions exhibit a completely transformed architectural view and interior.

== Gallery ==
Castle views

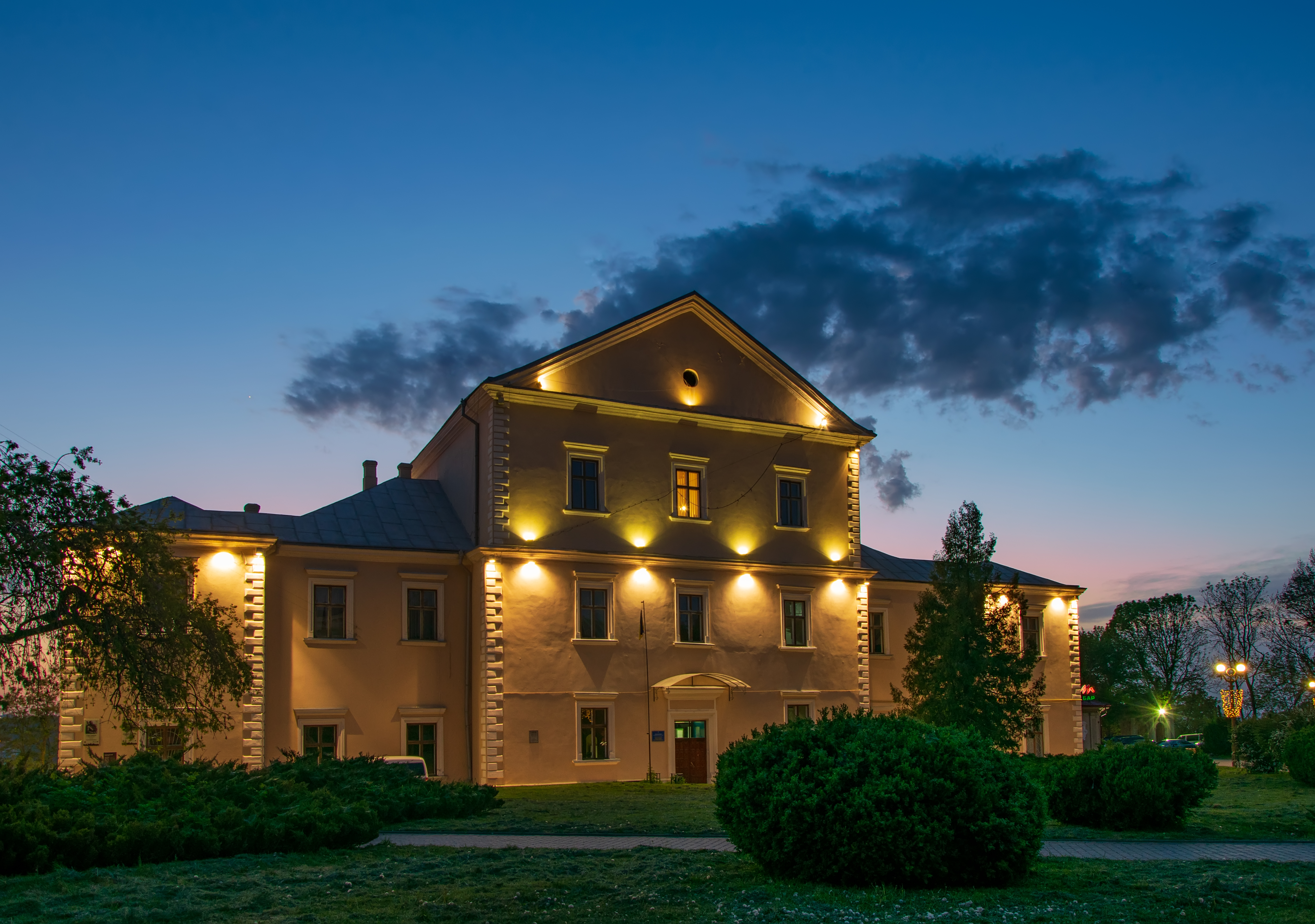
Night time illumination

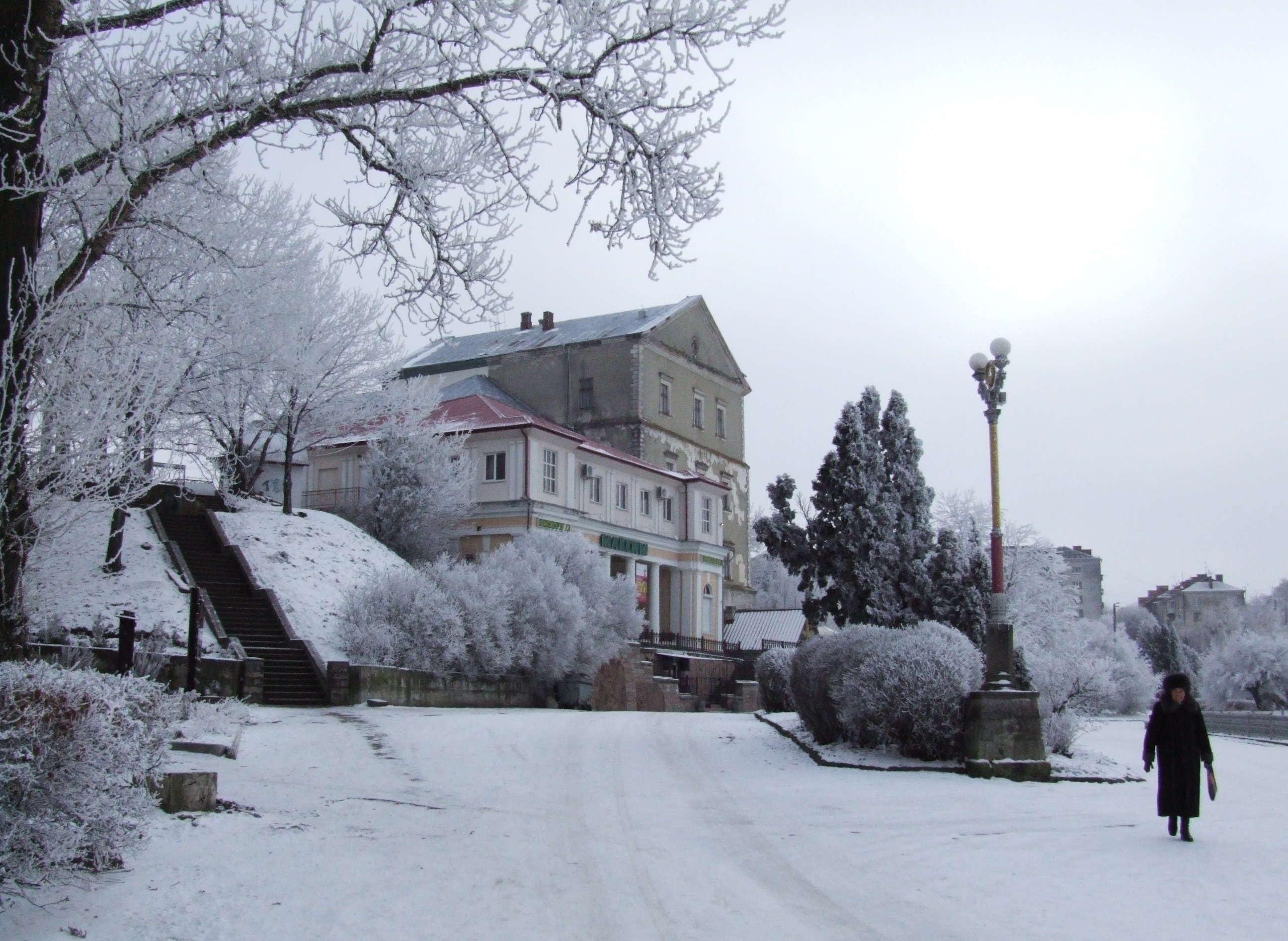
One frosty day of the season

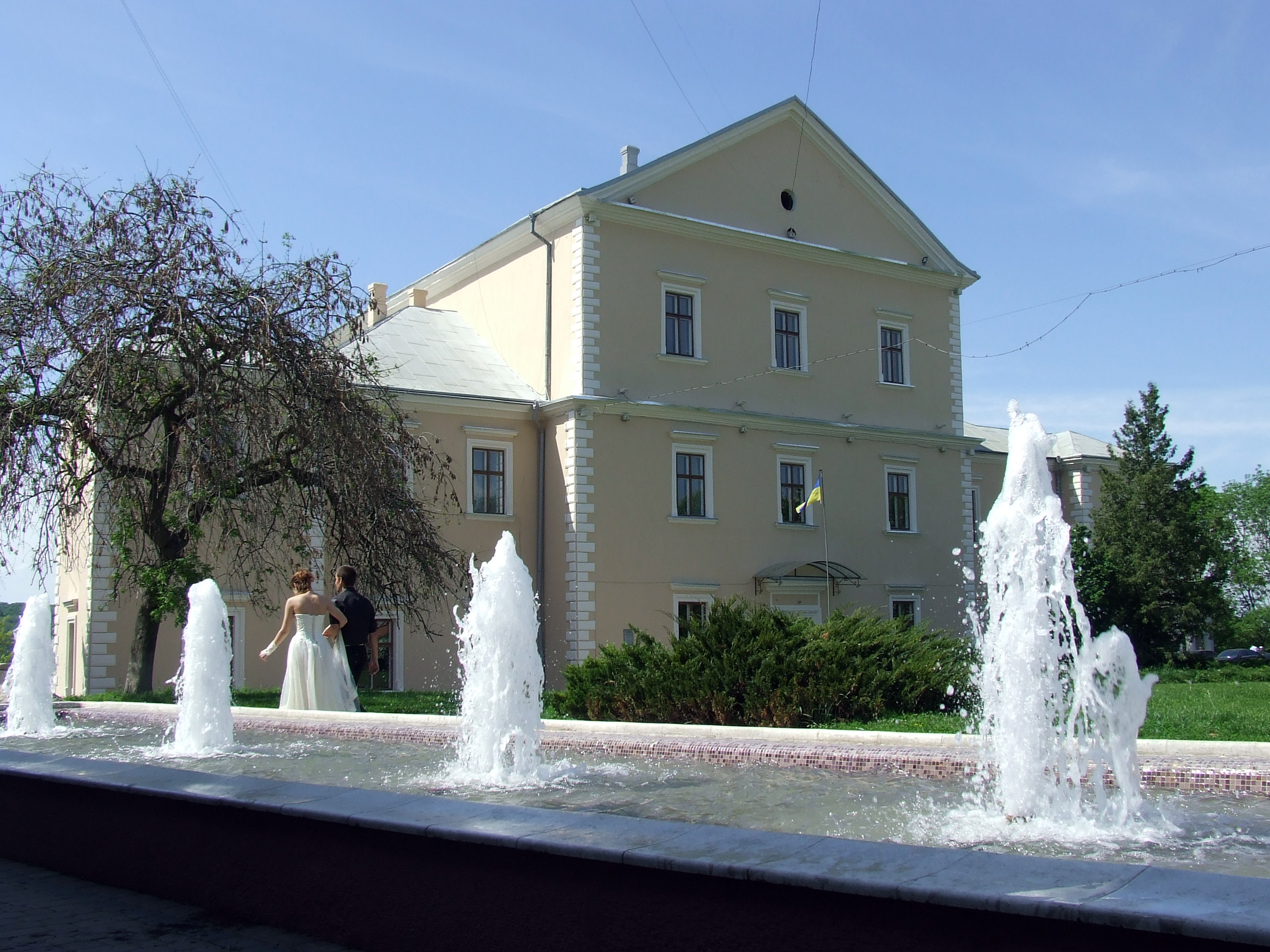
Newly wedded couple near the street castle entrance

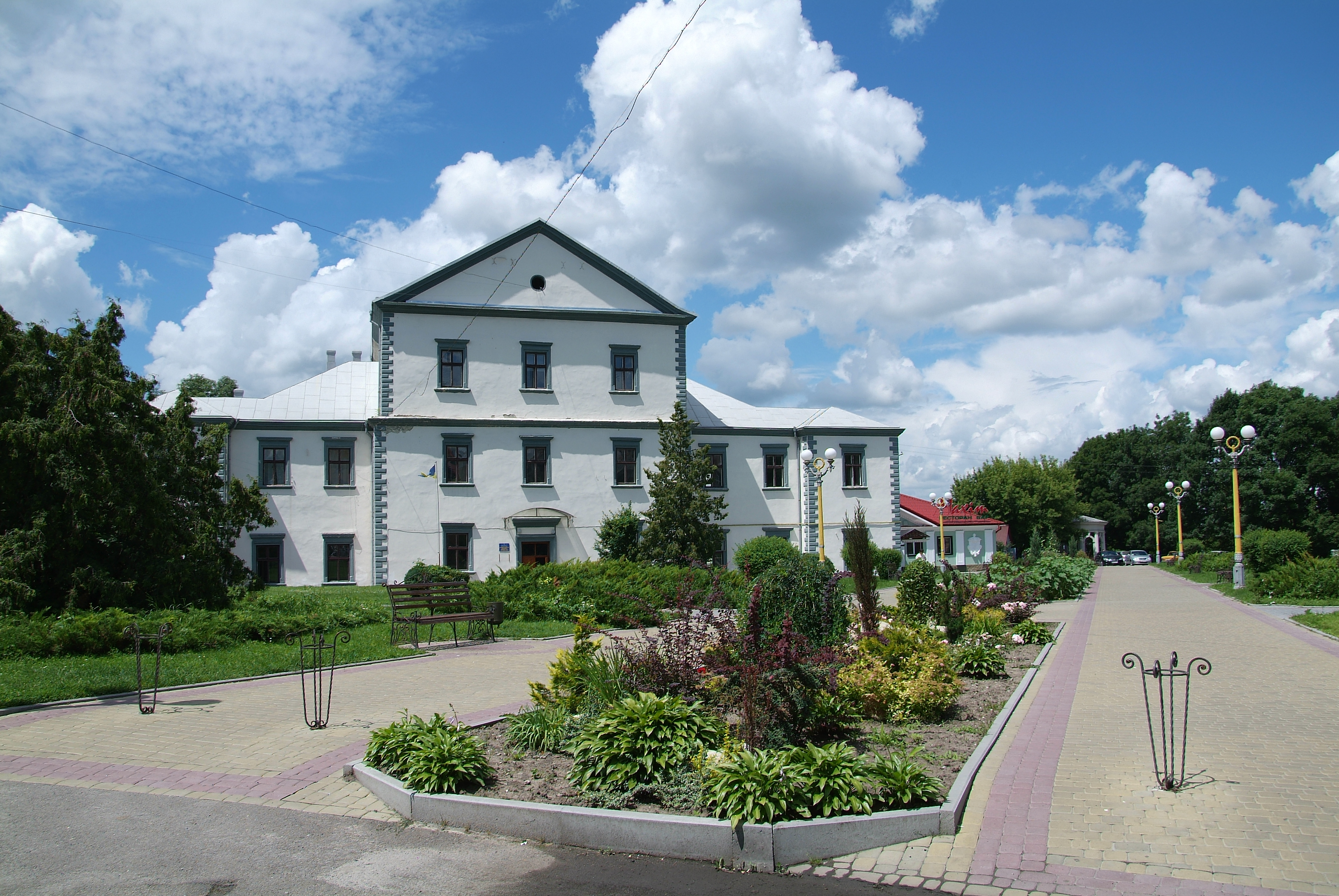
The summer day

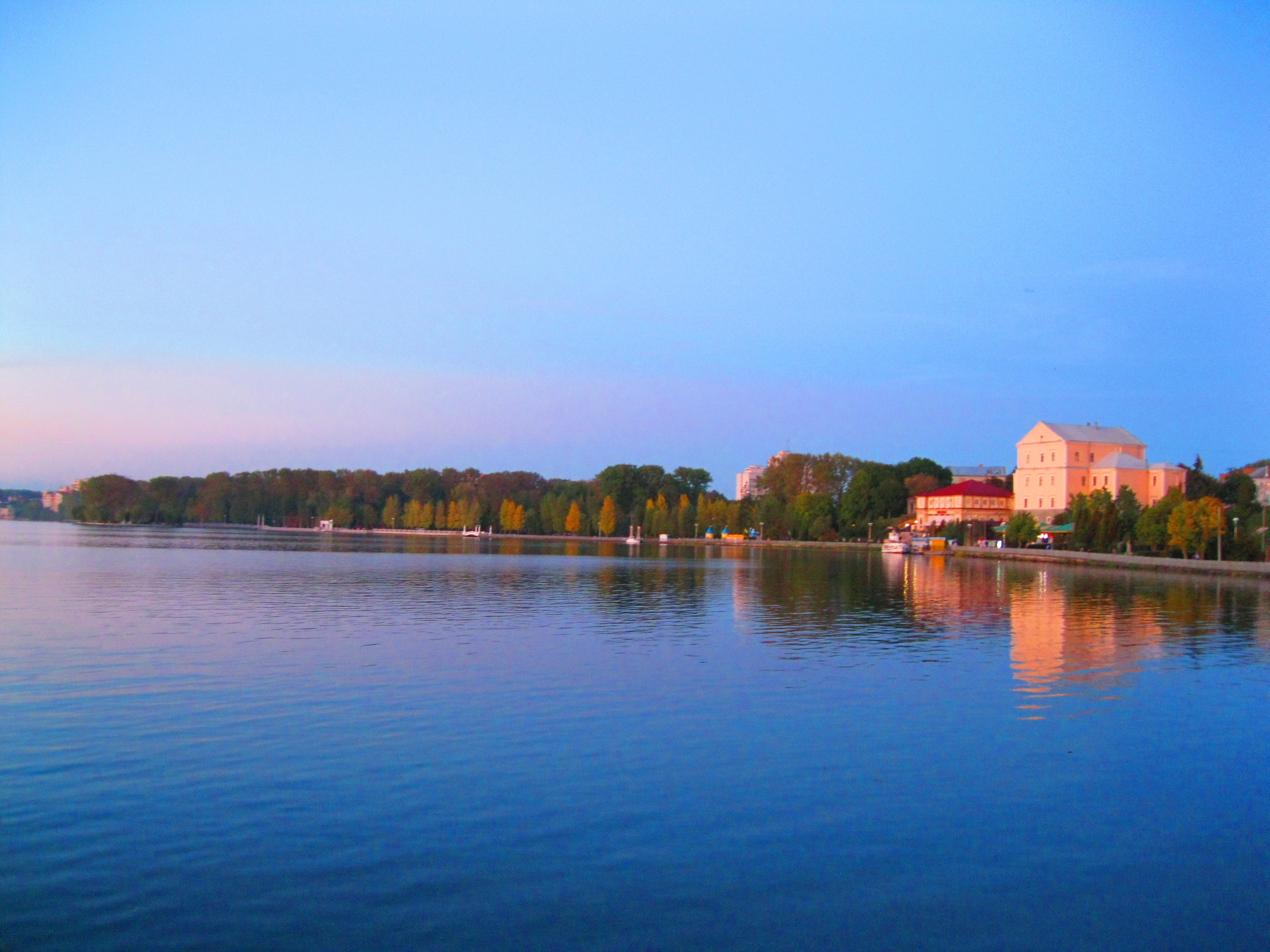
Ternopil Castle quayside

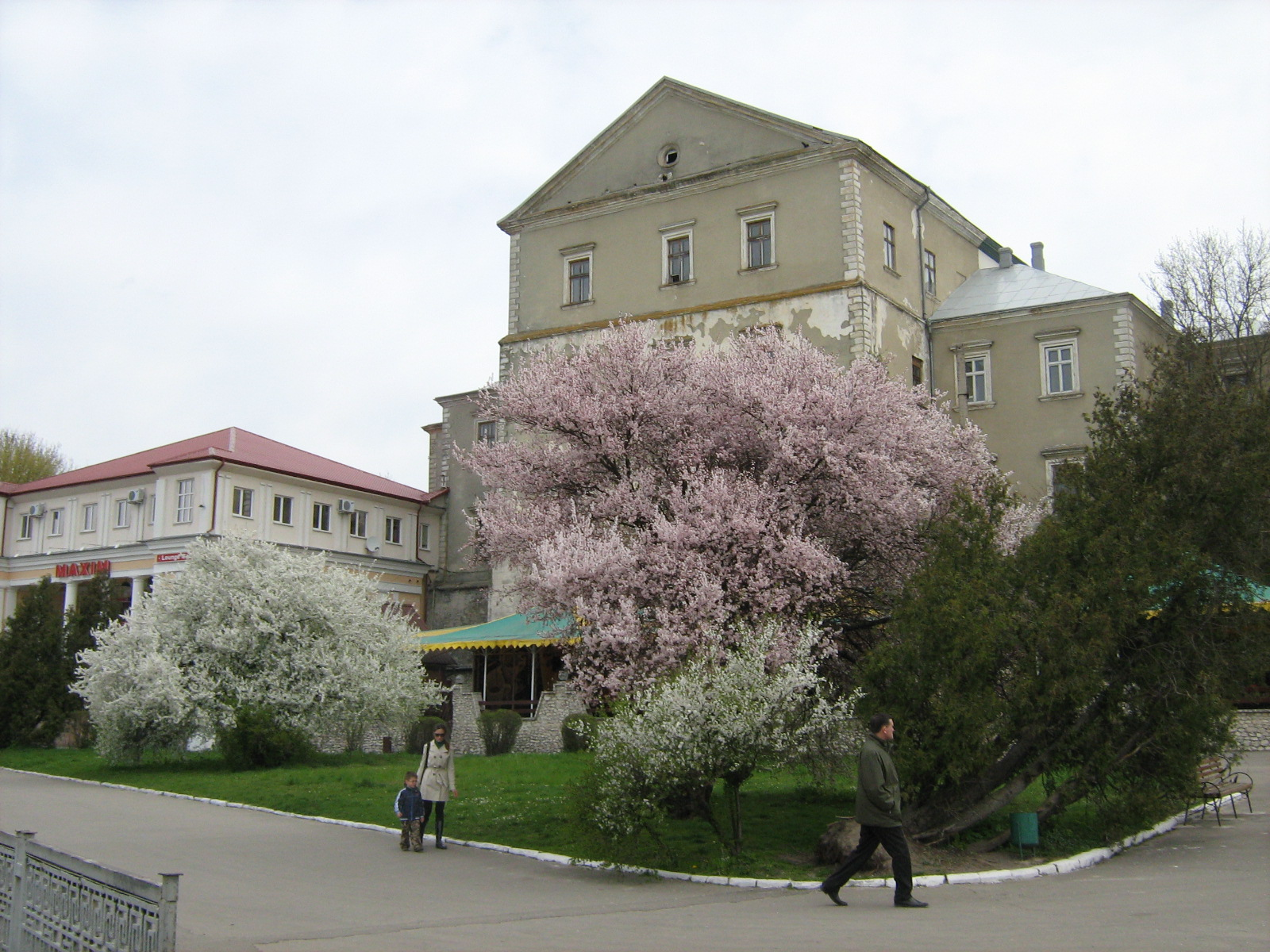
Spring bloom in the castle yard

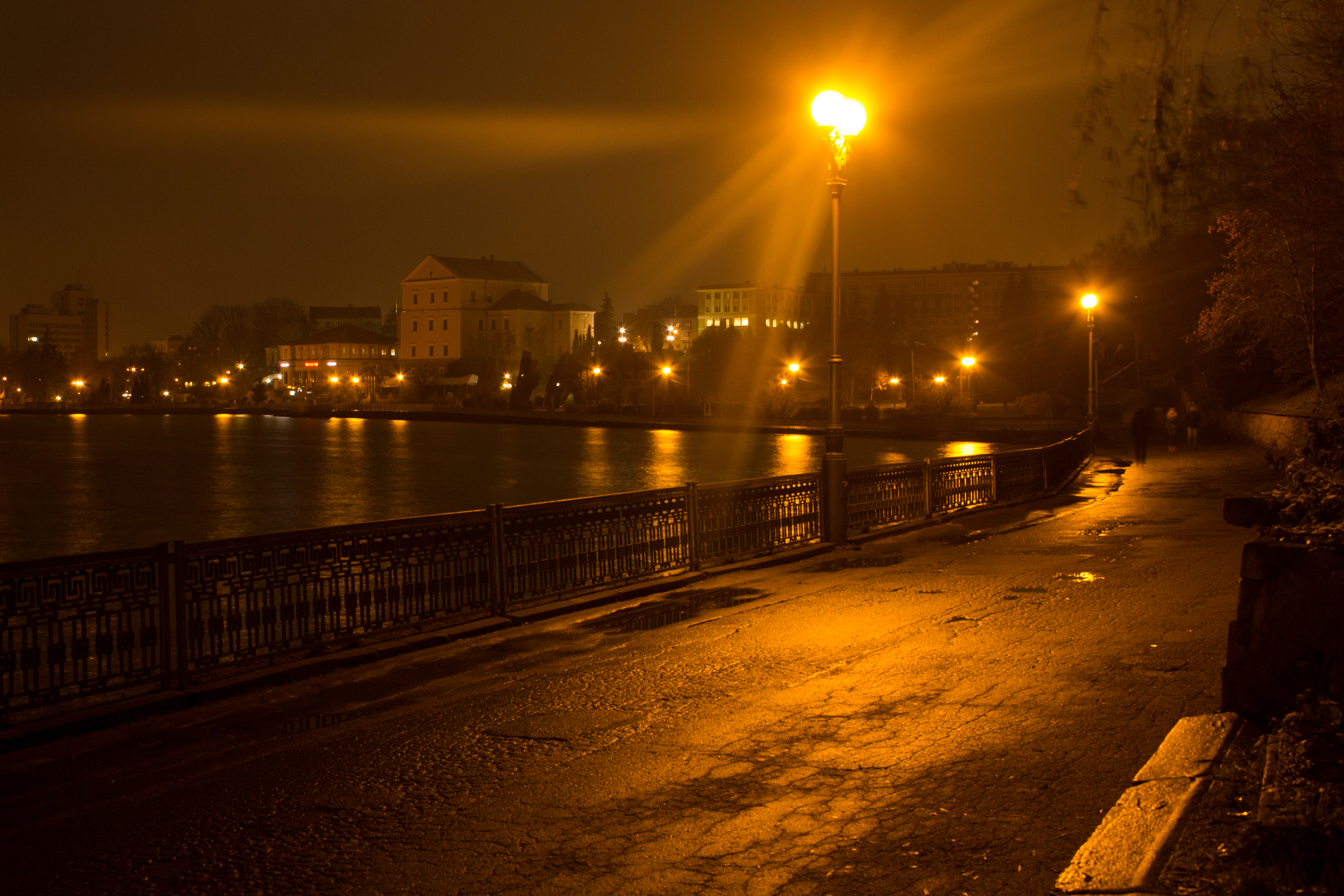
Castle street night lighting

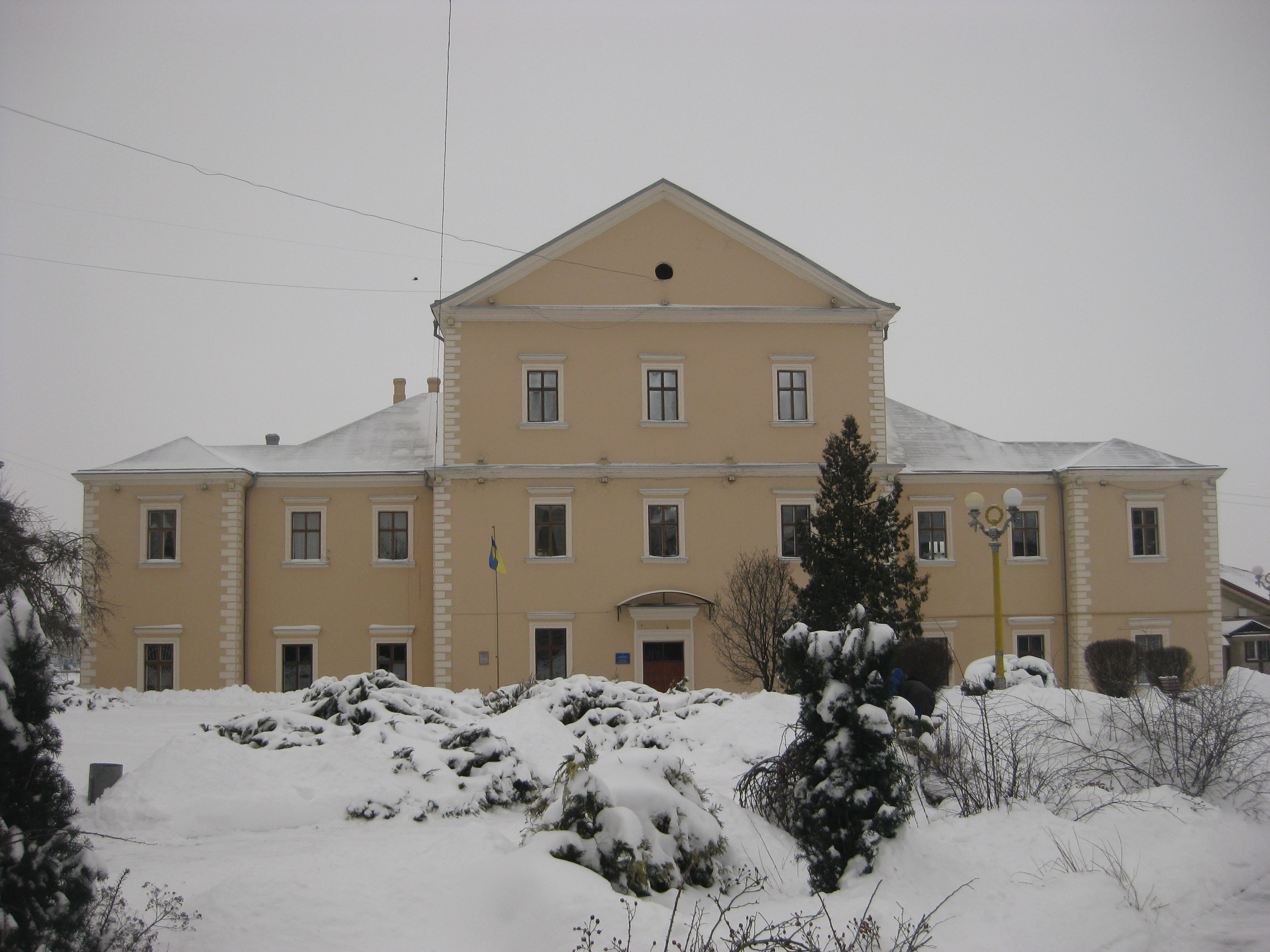
One wintry day of the old times

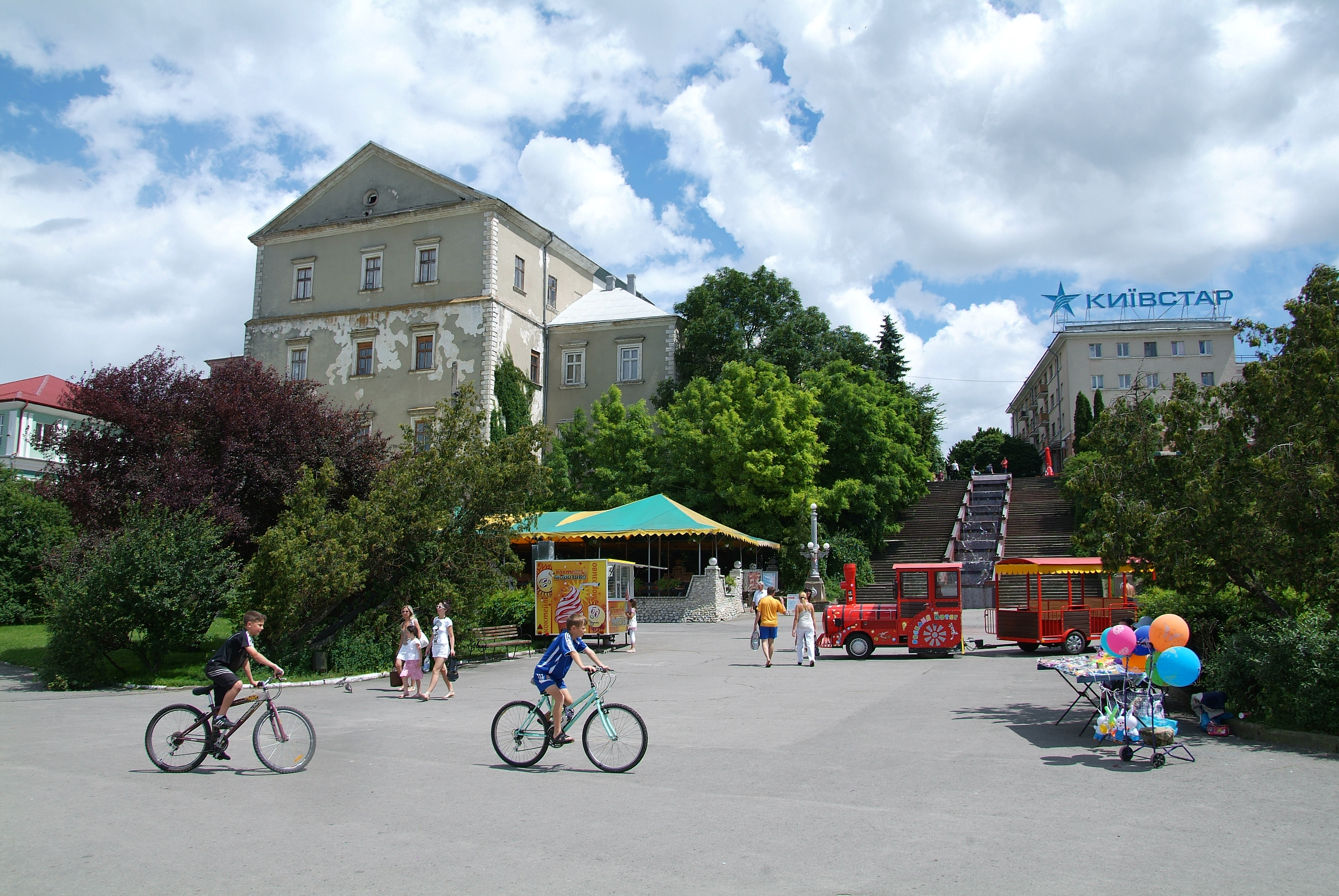
Children entertainment in the back yard on the hot summer day

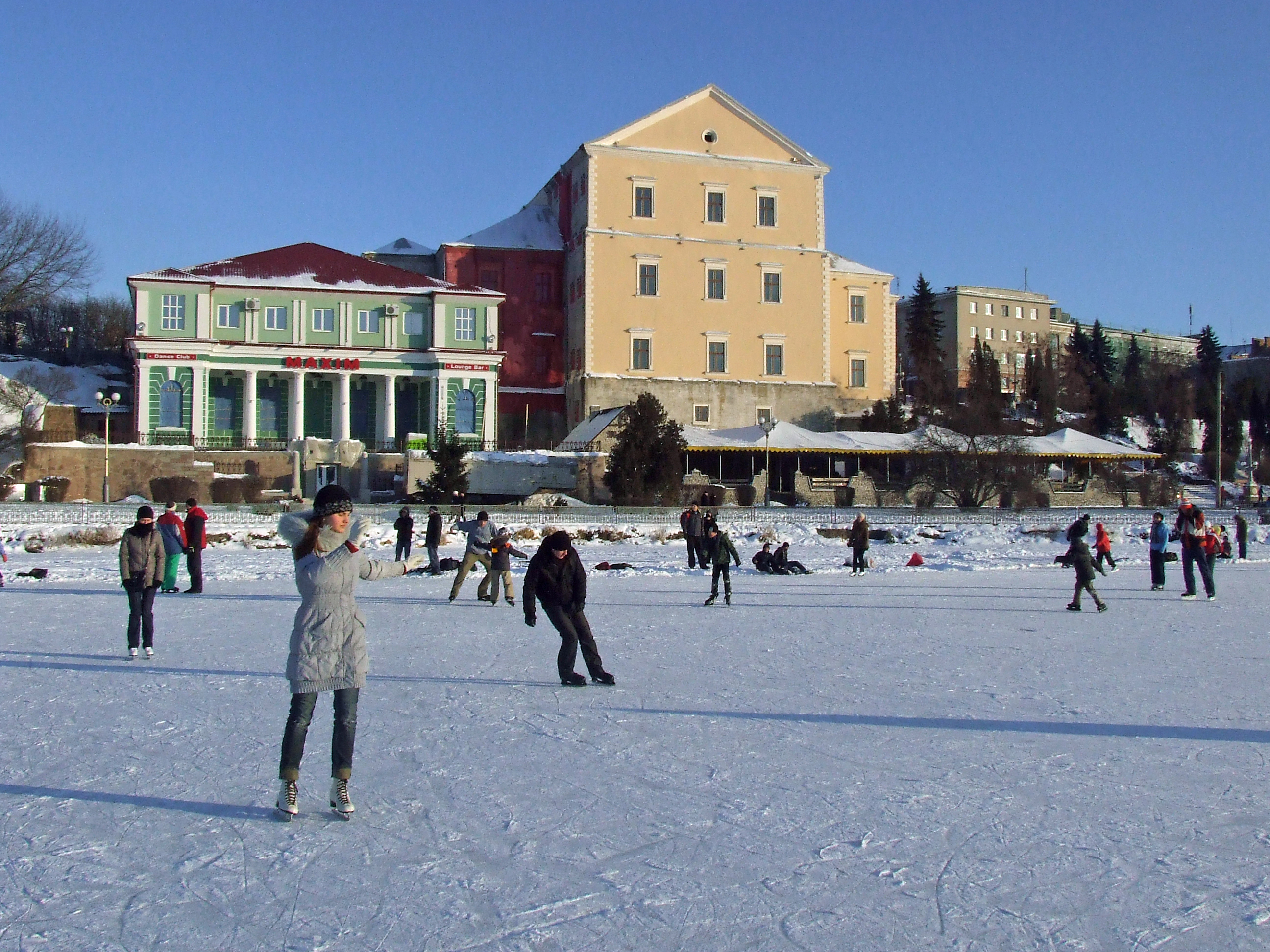
Skating on the frozen lake in the castle backyard

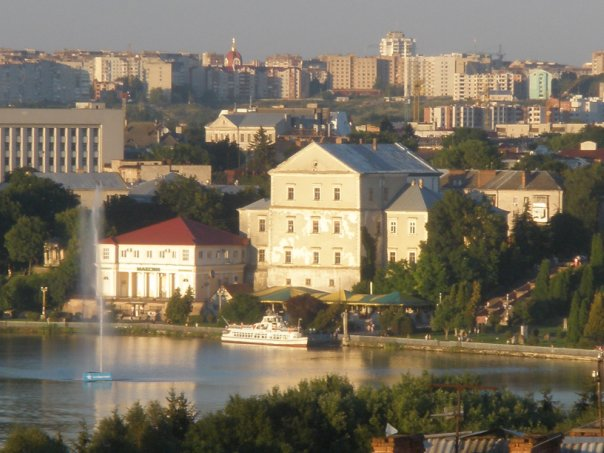
City center view on the castle

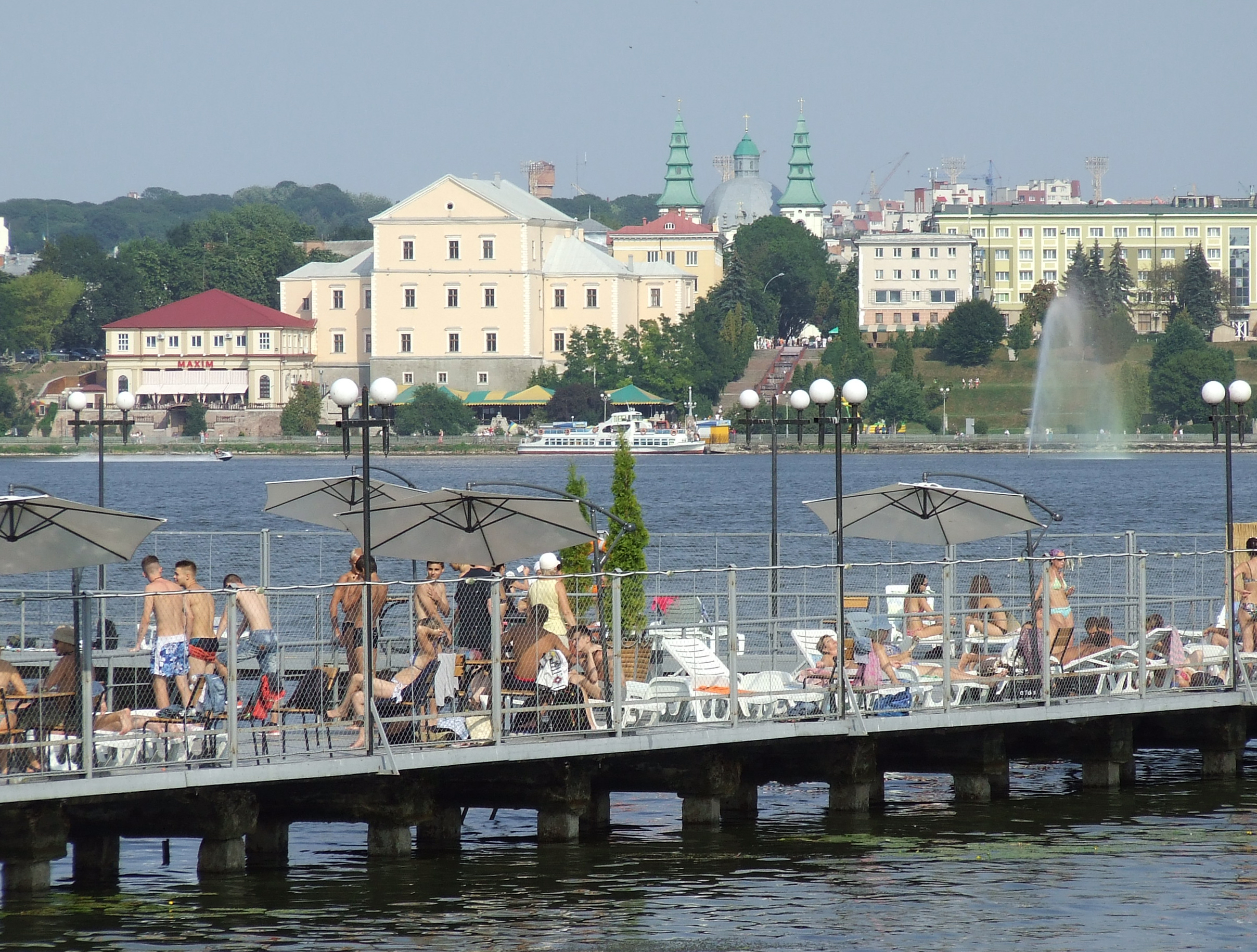
Ternopil lake Riviera Beach

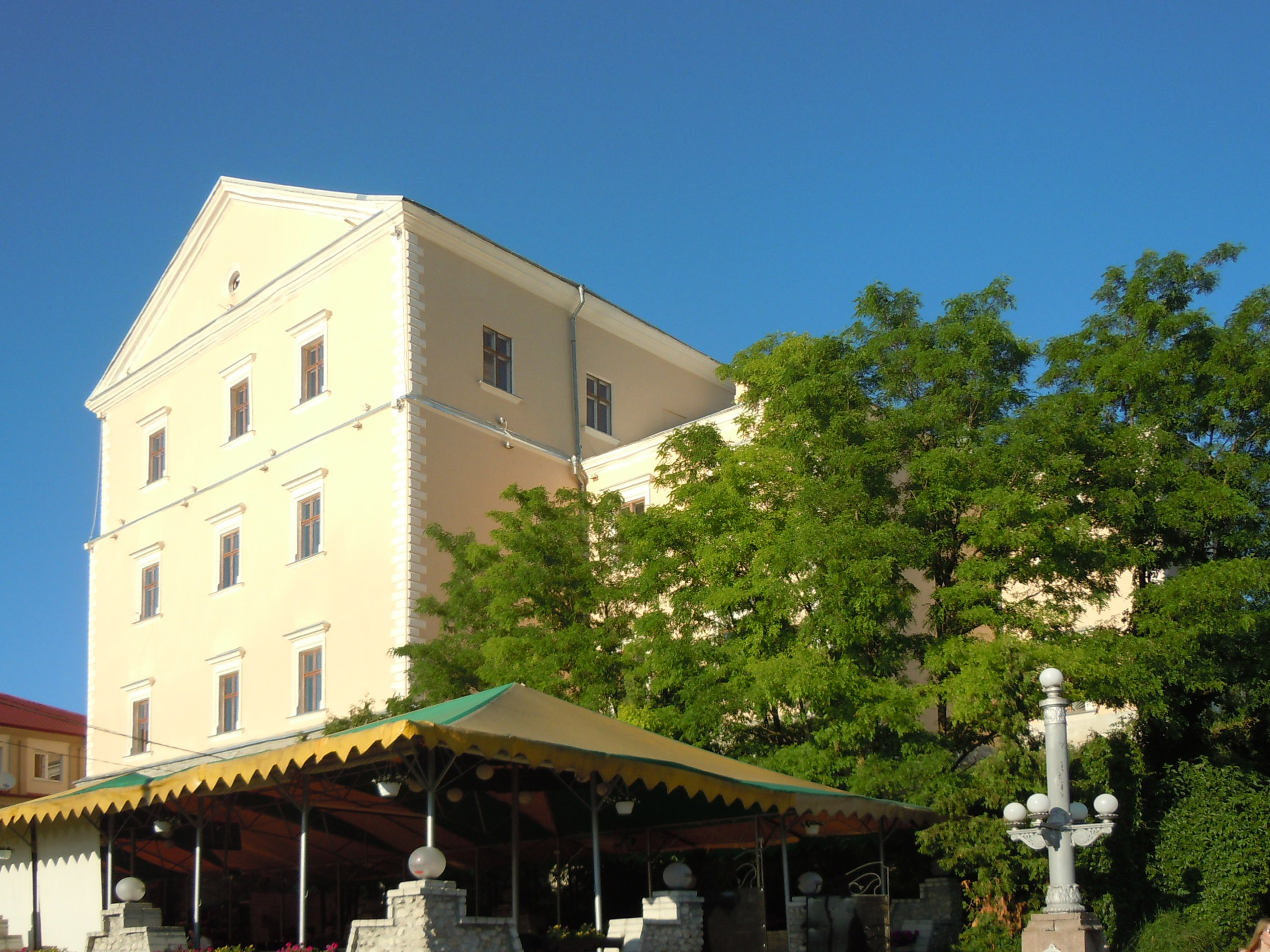
Loquacious solitude

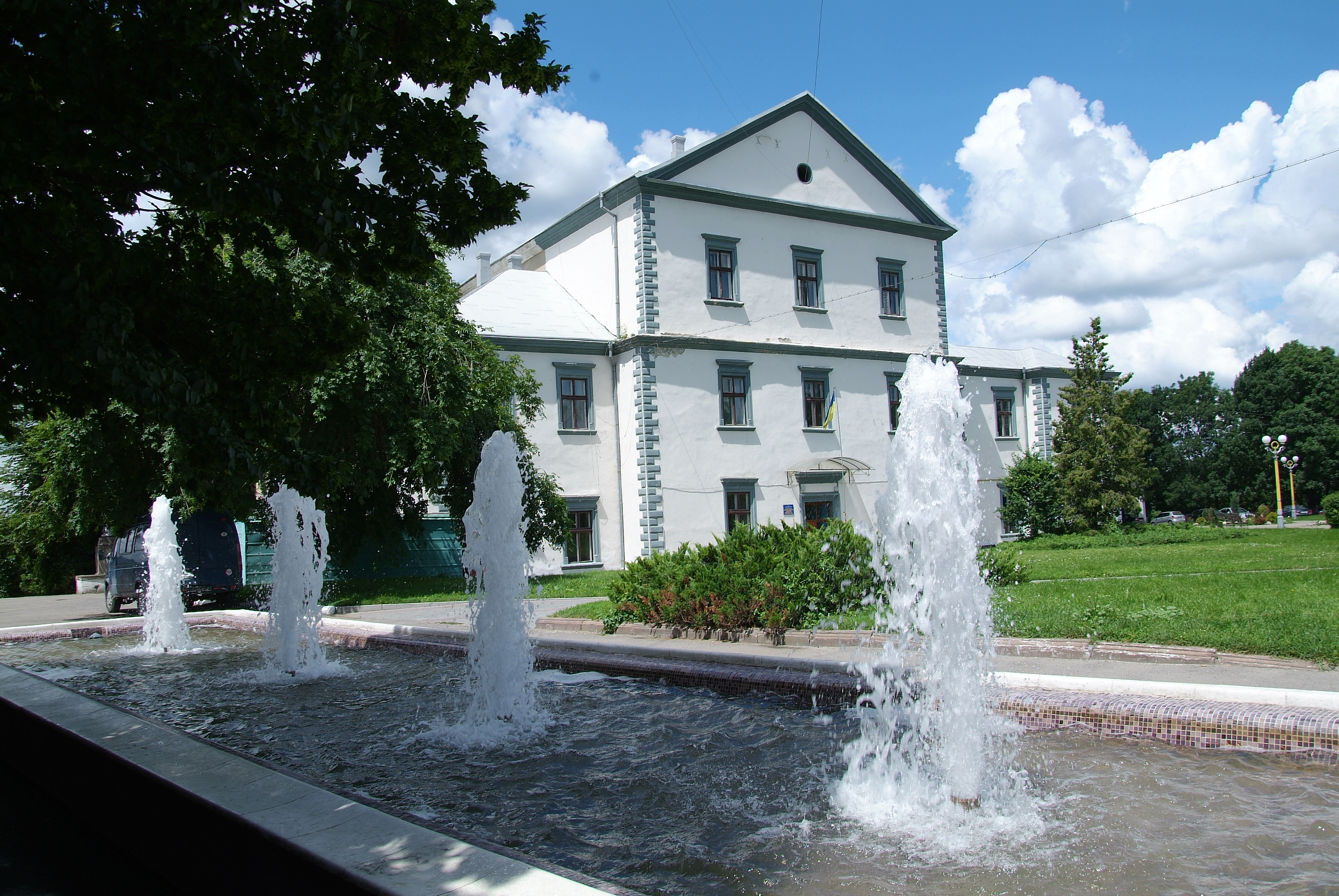
Freshness of the day

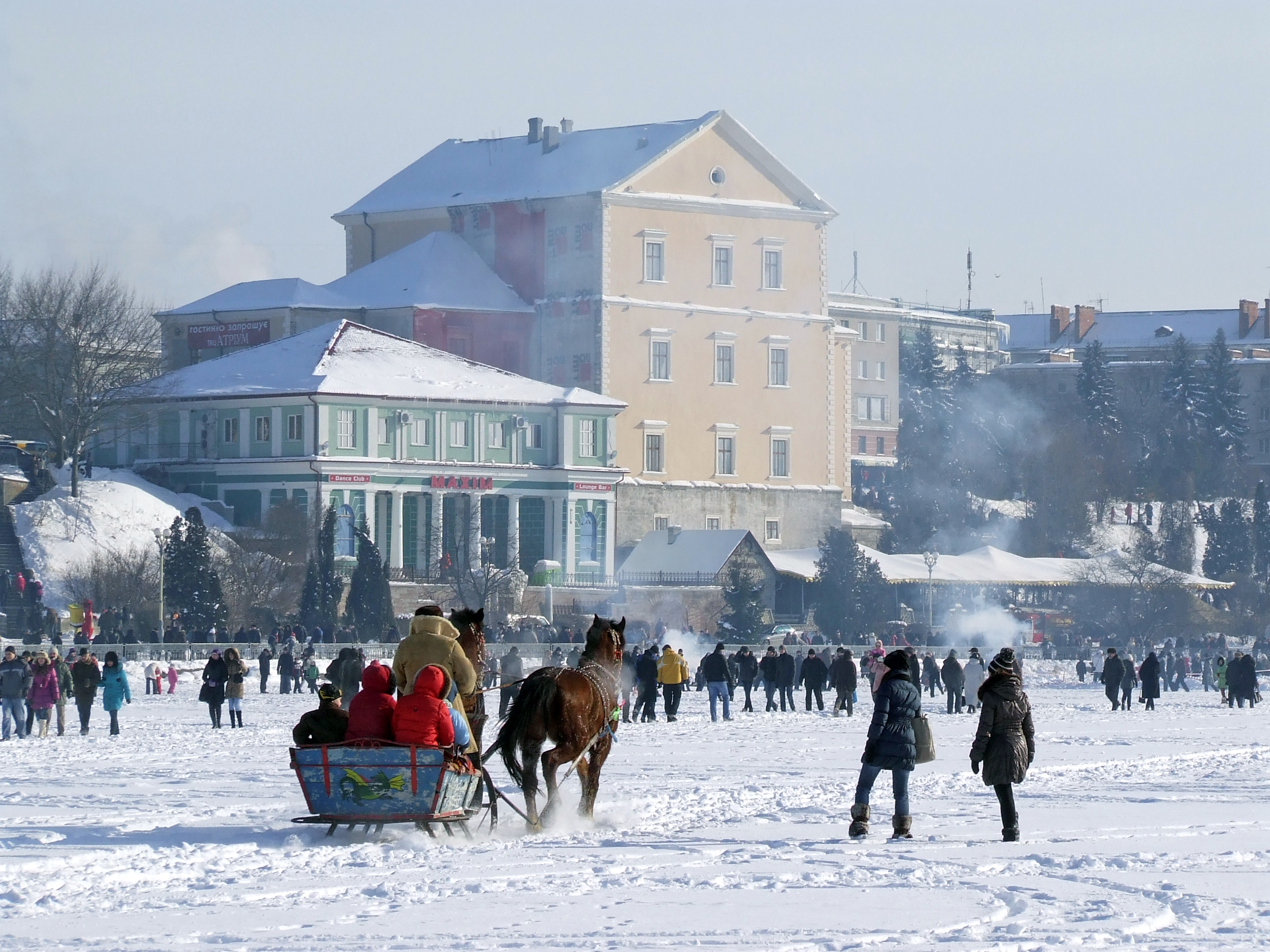
Horses pulling a sleigh on the castle lake ice.

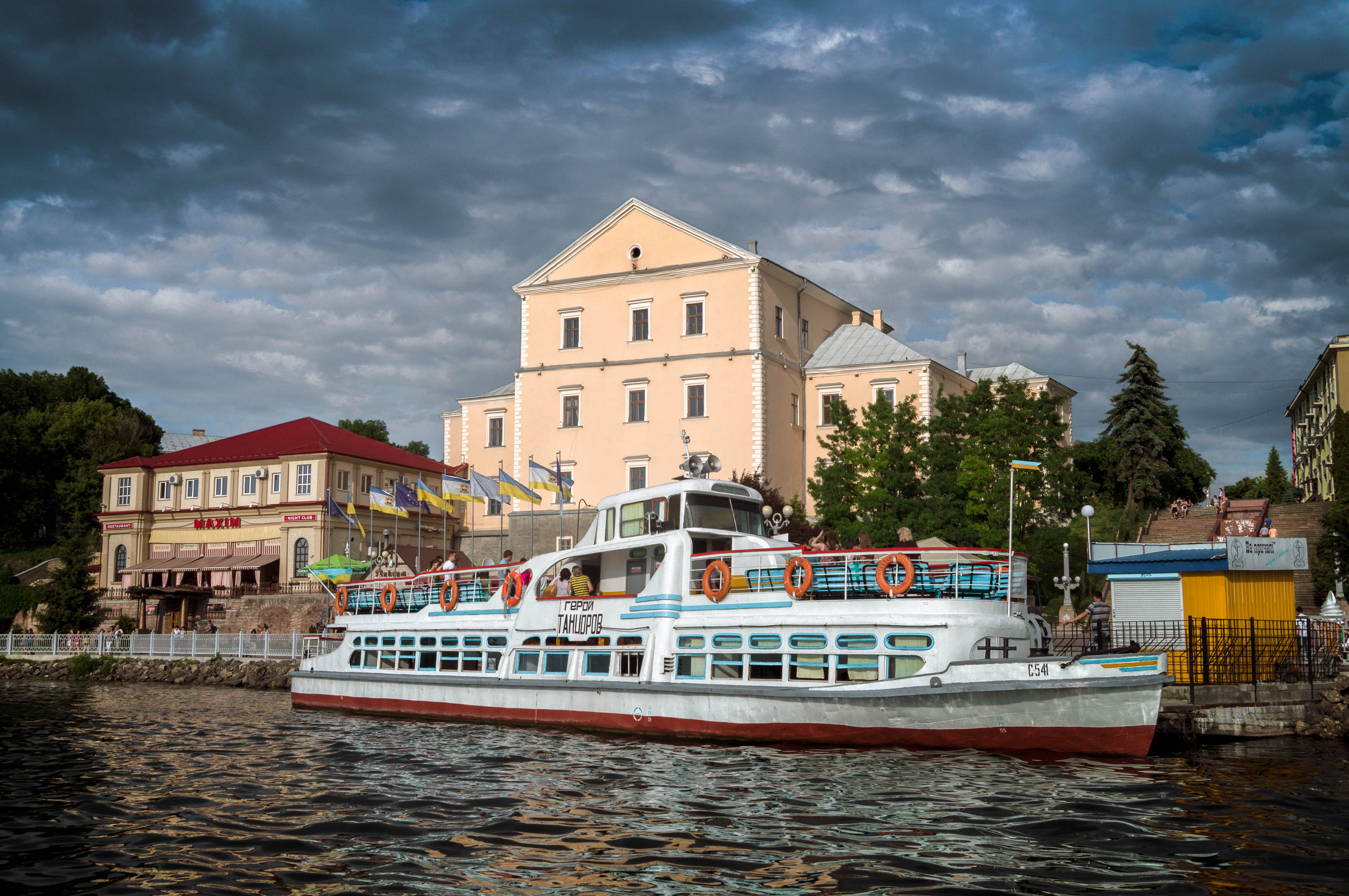
Closeup from Ternopil Pond.
