= Monastyrskaya =

Monastyrskaya may refer to:

- Feminine form of the surname Monastyrsky
- Monastyrskaya, Belozersky District, Vologda Oblast, Village in Vologda Oblast, Russia
- Monastyrskaya, Vashkinsky District, Vologda Oblast
- Monastyrskaya, Syamzhensky District, Vologda Oblast
- Monastyrskaya River, Crimea

== See also ==
- Monastyrsky (disambiguation)
- Monastyrska
