= Monastyr =

Monastyr may refer to:

- Monastyr, Dobryansky District, Russia
- Monastyr, Gaynsky District, Russia
- Monastyr (role-playing game)

== See also ==
- Monastyrsky (disambiguation)
