= Buchach Raion =

Former subdivision of Ternopil Oblast, Ukraine

Buchach Raion Бучацький район
- Raion
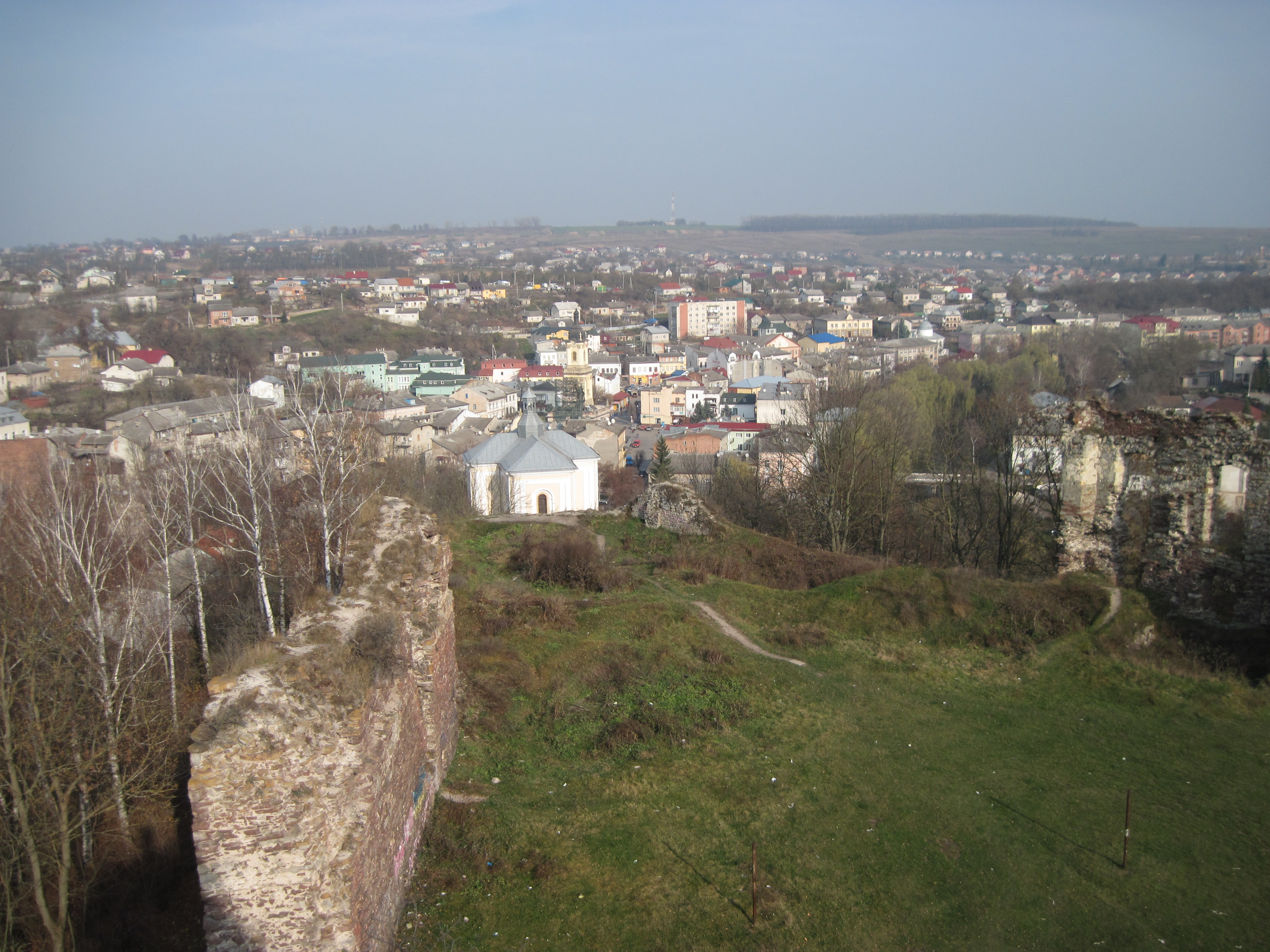

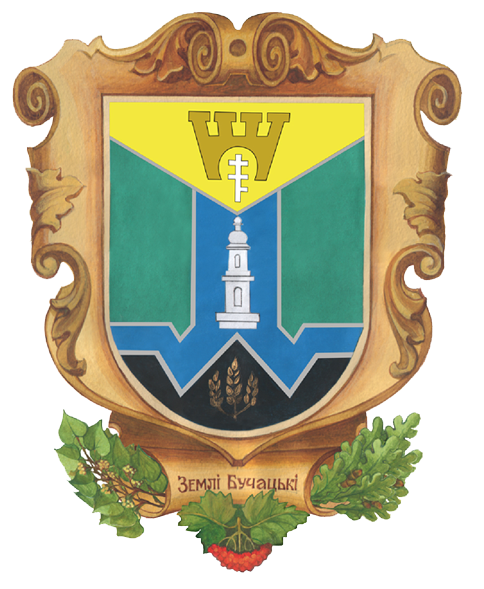
- Coat of arms

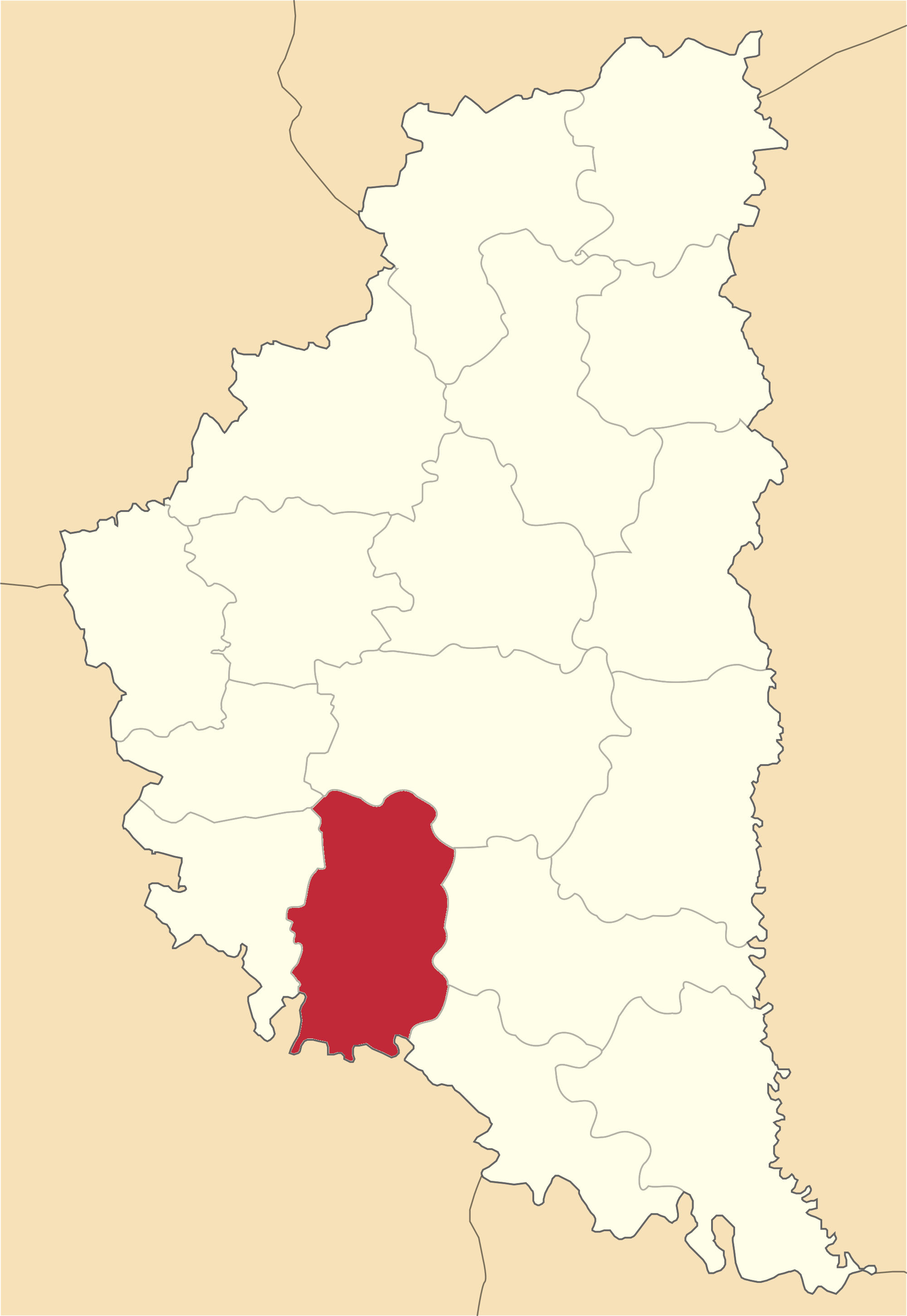
- Coordinates: 49°02′N 25°22′E
- Country: Ukraine
- Oblast: Ternopil Oblast
- Established: 1940
- Disestablished: 18 July 2020
- Admin. center: Buchach
- Subdivisions: List: — city councils; — settlement councils; — rural councils; Number of localities: — cities; — urban-type settlements; 57 — villages; — rural settlements

Area
  - Total: 802 km^{2} (310 sq mi)

Population (2020)
  - Total: 62,242
  - Density: 77.6/km^{2} (201/sq mi)
- Time zone: UTC+02:00 (EET)
  - Summer (DST): UTC+03:00 (EEST)
- Area code: 380-3544

Buchach Raion (Ukrainian: Бучацький район) was a raion (district) of Ternopil Oblast in western Ukraine. Its administrative center was the city of Buchach. The raion was abolished on 18 July 2020 as part of the administrative reform of Ukraine, which reduced the number of raions of Ternopil Oblast to three. The area of Buchach Raion was merged into Chortkiv Raion. The last estimate of the raion population was 62,242 (2020 est.).

== Subdivisions ==
At the time of disestablishment, the raion consisted of three hromadas:

- Buchach urban hromada with the administration in Buchach;
- Trybukhivtsi rural hromada with the administration in the selo of Trybukhivtsi;
- Zolotyi Potik settlementl hromada with the administration in the urban-type settlement of Zolotyi Potik.

== Settlemetts ==
=== Town ===
- Buchach

=== Urban-type settlement ===
- Zolotyi Potik

=== Villages ===
==== Present ====
- Barysh, Beremiany, Biliavyntsi, Bobulyntsi, Brovari, Dobropole, Duliby, Hubyn, Kosmyryn, Kostil'nyky, Kurdybanivka, Kydaniv, Lishchantsi, Martynivka, Mateushivka, Medvedivtsi, Mykolayivka, Mlynky, Naberezhne, Novi Petlykivtsi, Novosilka, Novostavtsi, Ozeriany, Osivtsi, Peredmistia, Perevoloka, Pidzamochok, Pyliava, Pyshkivtsi, Pidlissia, Pozhezha, Rukomysh, Rusyliv, Stari Petlykivtsi, Trybukhivtsi, Tsvitova, Verbiatyn, Vozyliv, Yazlovets, Zalishchyky, Zaryvyntsi, Zelena, Zhnyborody, Zhyznomyr, Zubrets, Zvenyhorod.

==== Former ====
- Kaduby, Nahirianka

== People ==
- Petro Gadz — a Ukrainian entrepreneur and politician
- Ihor Kostenko, (Ukrainian: Ігор Ігорович Костенко) (31 December 1991 – 20 February 2014) — a Ukrainian journalist, student and activist killed during the Euromaidan events.
- Solomiya Krushelnytska (Ukrainian: Соломія Крушельницька) (23 September 1872 – 16 November 1952) — one of the brightest soprano opera stars of the first half of the 20th century
- Bohdan Andrew Futey — a retired attorney and judge who served with the United States Court of Federal Claims from 1987 to 2002.
- Jan Samuel Chrzanowski — a Polish officer known for his command during the Battle of Trembowla
- Kornel Ujejski — a Polish poet, patriot and political writer of the Austrian Empire and Austria-Hungary.
- Antoni Prochaska — a Polish historian.

== Books ==
About Buchach district Shevchenko Scientific Society 1972 published a book «The city of Buchach and its Region».

== See also ==
- Subdivisions of Ukraine
