= Pidzamochok =

Village in Ternopil Oblast, Ukraine

Pidzamochok Підзамочок
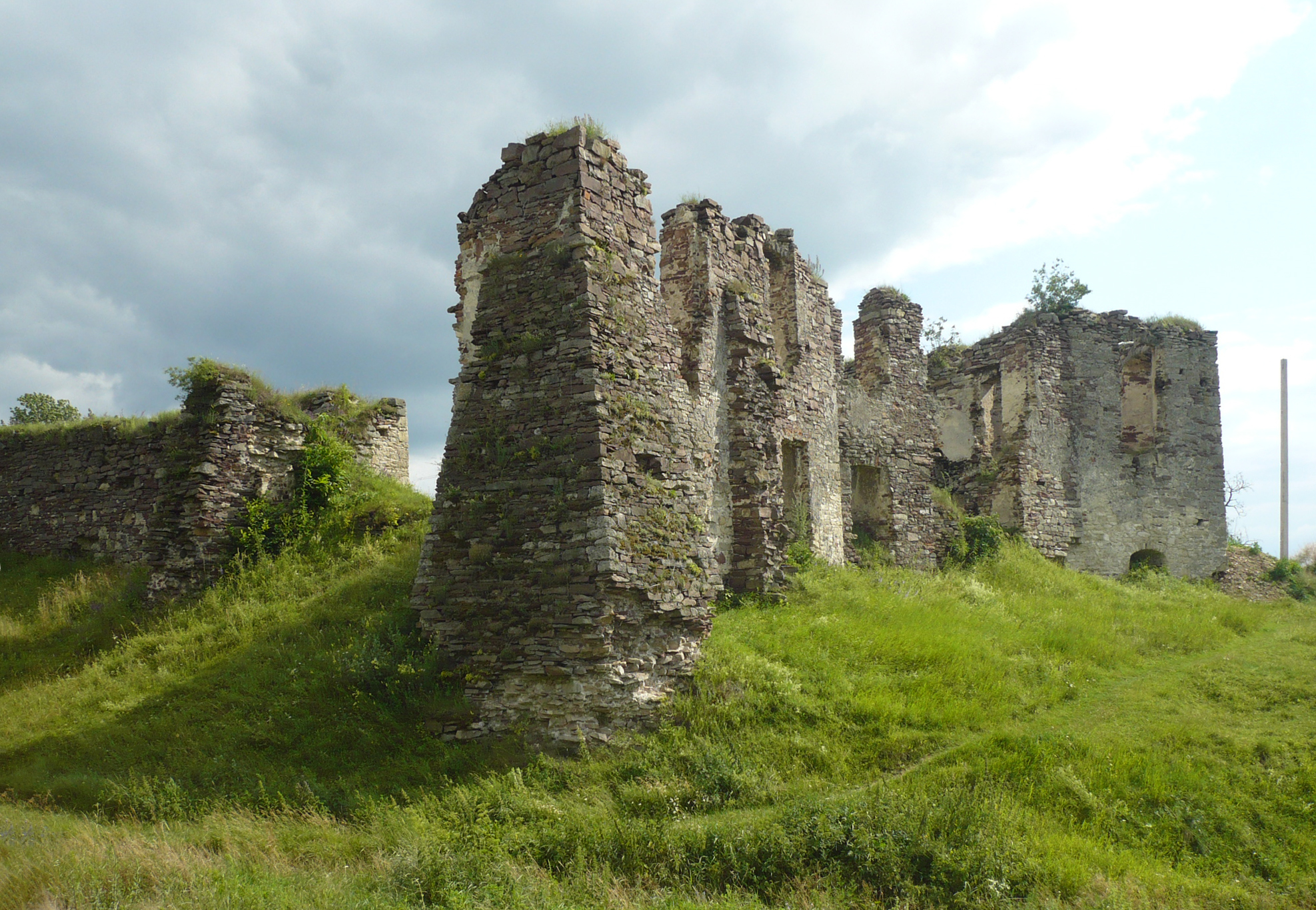
- Interactive map of Pidzamochok
- Coordinates: 49°04′38″N 25°23′53″E
- Country: Ukraine
- Oblast: Ternopil Oblast
- Raion: Chortkiv Raion

Area
  - Total: 1.50 km^{2} (0.58 sq mi)

Population (2001 census)
  - Total: 1,541
  - Density: 1,467.62/km^{2} (3,801.1/sq mi)
- Time zone: UTC+2 (EET)
  - Summer (DST): UTC+3 (EEST)
- Postal code: 48423
- Area code: +380 3544

Pidzamochok (Ukrainian: Підзамочок, Polish: Podzameczek) is a village in Chortkiv Raion (district) of Ternopil Oblast (province) in western Ukraine. It belongs to Buchach urban hromada, one of the hromadas of Ukraine. Suburbs of Buchach. Strypa River (left tributary of the Dniester river) flows near of the village.

== History ==
First written mention comes from the 18th century. Then belonged to the Polish–Lithuanian Commonwealth, from 1772 until 1918 to Austrian (Habsburg monarchy, Austrian Empire, Austria-Hungary) empires, in 1918-1919 to West Ukrainian People's Republic. From 1991 belonged to Ukraine.

Reading room of Ukrainian society Prosvita operated in the village.

Until 18 July 2020, Pidzamochok belonged to Buchach Raion. The raion was abolished in July 2020 as part of the administrative reform of Ukraine, which reduced the number of raions of Ternopil Oblast to three. The area of Buchach Raion was merged into Chortkiv Raion.

== Attractions ==
- Church of the Nativity of the Blessed Virgin, former Roman Catholic church
- Chapel
- Statue of Holy Virgin Mary, of St. Anthony the Great
- Pidzamochok castle

== Sources ==
- (in Ukrainian) П. Слюсарчук, В. Уніят., Підзамочок // Ternopil Encyclopedic Dictionary: in 4 v. / editorial board: H. Yavorskyi and other, Ternopil: "Zbruch", 2008, V. 3: П—Я, S. 82. — ISBN 978-966-528-279-2.
- "Podzameczek". Geographical Dictionary of the Kingdom of Poland (in Polish). 8. Warszawa: Kasa im. Józefa Mianowskiego. 1887. p. 492.
