= Petro Gadz =

Ukrainian entrepreneur and politician (born 1960)

Hero of Ukraine Petro Gadz OS
- Петро Гадз
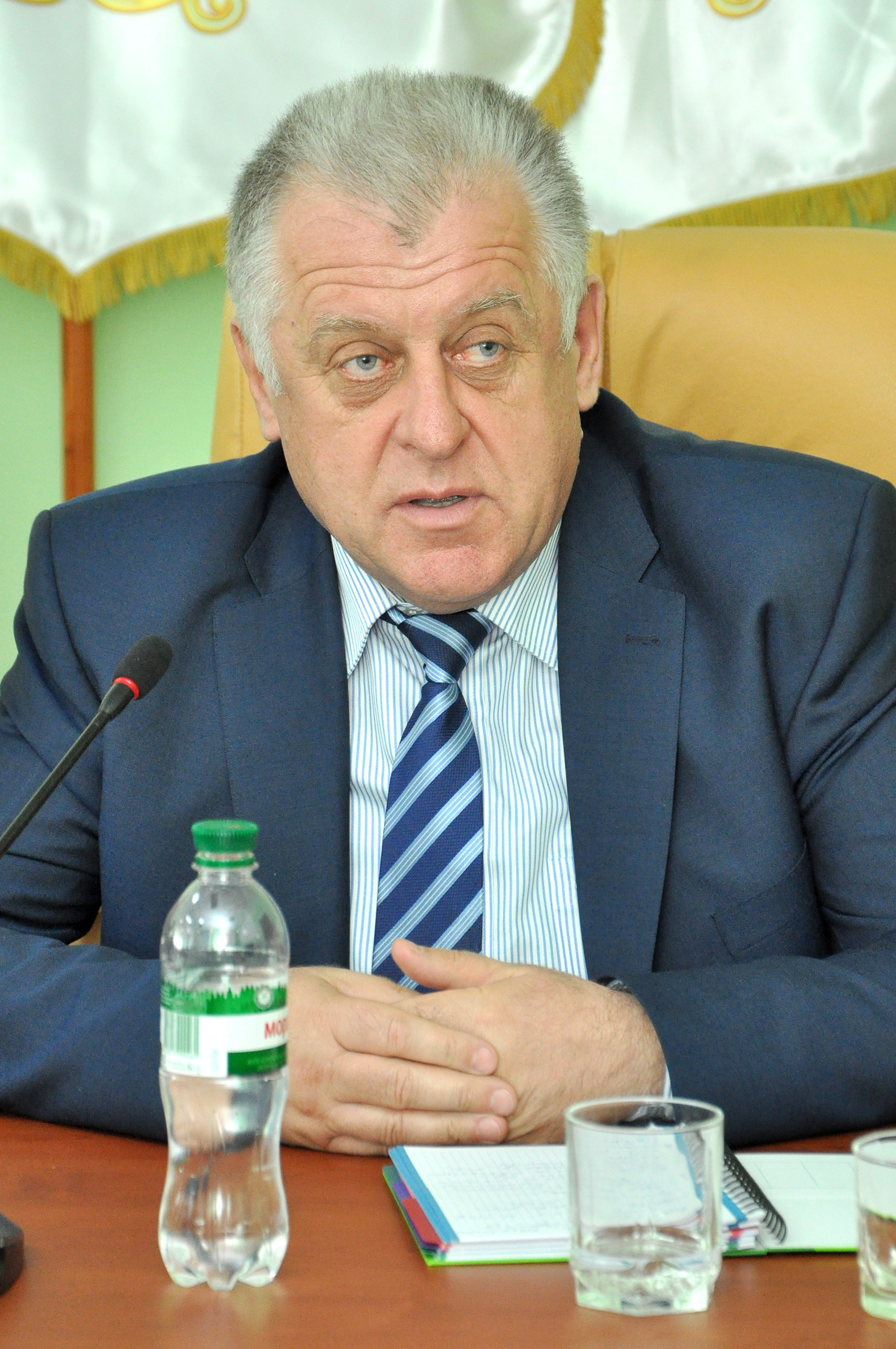
- Gadz in 2016
- Born: 21 August 1960 (age 66); Zelena, Ukrainian SSR, Soviet Union (now Ukraine)
- Education: Kyiv Institute of Culture
- Occupations: Entrepreneur; teacher; politician
- Organization(s): Founder and director of Farm GADZ and Buchachagrokhlibprom
- Political party: Agrarian Party of Ukraine (2002–2006); Petro Poroshenko Bloc (2015–2019)
- Spouse: Maria Pavlovna
- Children: 1
- Awards: Hero of Ukraine

Petro Ivanovych Gadz (Ukrainian: Петро Іванович Гадз; born 21 August 1960) is a Ukrainian agro-entrepreneur, public figure and music teacher who is a recipient of the Hero of Ukraine in 2012. He is also the founder and director of the vegetable and fruit farm company Farm GADZ. Additionally, he is also the deputy chairman of the Agrarian Union of Ukraine.

== Early life and education ==
Born on 21 August 1960, in the Ukrainian village of Zelena. Gadz was born into a farming family in the Ternopil Oblast, laying the foundation for his agricultural background. His educational journey began at Buchach Children's Music School, Ternopil Music School in 1978, followed by graduation from the Kyiv Institute of Culture (now Kyiv National University of Culture and Arts) in 1986.

== Career ==
Throughout his career, Gadz held various teaching positions, including roles at music schools in Monastyrsky and Dzhuryn. Transitioning into administrative roles, he served as director of the music school in Yazlovka from 1984 to 1995 before venturing into entrepreneurship until 2001. Since then, he has been actively involved in agricultural leadership, notably as chairman of the supervisory board of the Buchachagrokhlibprom Society in the Ternopil Oblast.

Gadz's political engagement began in 2002, serving as a Deputy of the Ternopil Regional Council of the 4th convocation and as a member of the Buchach Raion Council, where he contributed to the permanent commission on agro-industrial complex and land relations. However, his political journey faced a shift in the fall of 2015 when he was expelled from the Agrarian Party of Ukraine. Undeterred, he registered as a candidate from the Petro Poroshenko Bloc in constituency No. 10 during the elections to the Ternopil Regional Council. Due to health concern on 28 November 2019, he announced his resignation as people's deputy.

Beyond politics, Gadz is also involved in public service as a member of the supervisory board of Ivan Horbachevsky Ternopil National Medical University, demonstrating his commitment to various spheres of community development. He assumed the presidency of FC Kolos Buchach on 21 August 2005, and holds significant positions within regional agricultural associations and unions. At the assembly hall of his agricultural firm Buchachagrokhlibprom in 2022, nominal certificates were given to the top tenth grade pupils from Trybukhivtsi, Zolotopotitska, and Buchach Raion villages.

== Controversies ==
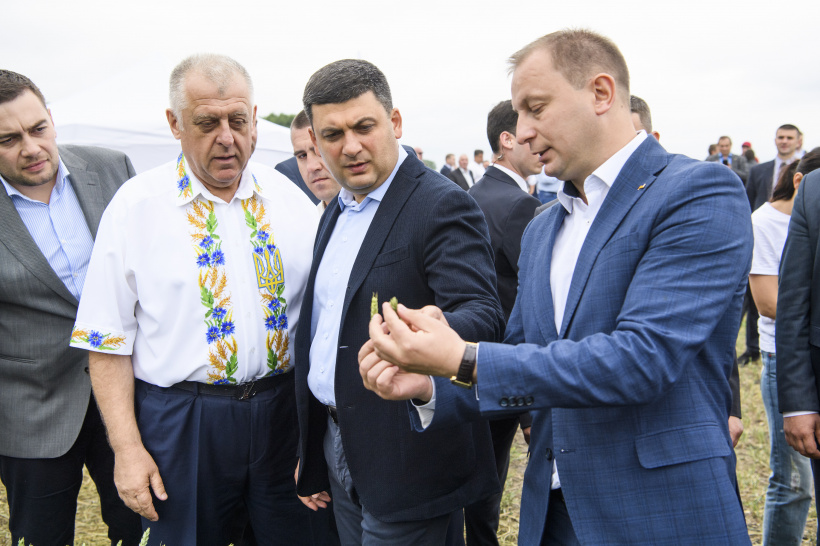
Gadz, Stepan Barna and Oleh Hrytsak in 2018

=== Political Ties and State Subsidies ===
In September 2017, members of the Ternopil Regional Council and people's deputies visited Gadz after their forced relocation to the Petro Poroshenko Bloc. Discussions during the Verkhovna Rada meeting focused on land relations and agrarian policy in Buchach, with him securing funding for his agricultural company during Petro Poroshenko's visit. Journalists uncovered that businesses associated with their assistants or members of the Verkhovna Rada's agriculture committee were the primary recipients of budget subsidies, leading to his company, LLC Buchachagrokhlibprom, receiving approximately 14 million in state support in 2019, facilitated by the assistance of Mykola Liushniak.

=== Allegations of Pollution ===
His nomination as chairman of the Ternopil Regional Council's permanent committee on environmental protection and natural management in 2020 was prompted by the outcry. After all, the person responsible for its destruction was chosen to save the environment. In late September 2020, a scandal erupted as it was revealed that Farm GADZ had been dumping sewage into a reservoir between the villages of Sokolivka and Zolotyi Potik, leading to widespread contamination and fish die-offs. Prompted by public outrage, environmental inspection authorities and the police responded by collecting samples for examination and investigating the incident, with locals attributing the recurring environmental disasters to sewage discharge from his dairy complex of Buchagrokhlibprom.

== Personal life ==
Gadz is married to Maria Pavlovna Gadz, and together they have a daughter.

== Awards and recognitions ==
With the granting of the Order of the State for exceptional personal contributions to Ukraine in the expansion of agricultural output, the introduction of cutting-edge technology and contemporary forms of management, and many years of selfless effort, he was named the Hero of Ukraine. Oleksii Reznikov, the minister of defense, gave the recognition on 9 July 2023, for his individual and professional contributions to the nation's farmers' victory.

Gadz has received awards and recognitions such as:

- Hero of Ukraine Order of the State (24 August 2012)
- 20 Years of Independence of Ukraine Medal (27 June 2012)
- Honored Worker of Agriculture of Ukraine (26 June 2008)
- Distinction of the Ministry of Defence of Ukraine Medal (9 July 2023)
