= Zelena, Buchach urban hromada, Chortkiv Raion, Ternopil Oblast =

Zelena Зелена
- Interactive map of Zelena
- Coordinates: 49°07′17″N 25°23′46″E
- Country: Ukraine
- Oblast: Ternopil Oblast
- Raion: Chortkiv Raion

Area
  - Total: 1.401 km^{2} (0.541 sq mi)

Population (2001 census)
  - Total: 688
  - Density: 491.08/km^{2} (1,271.9/sq mi)
- Time zone: UTC+2 (EET)
  - Summer (DST): UTC+3 (EEST)
- Postal code: 48476
- Area code: +380 3544

Zelena (Ukrainian: Зелена, Polish: Browary) is a village in Chortkiv Raion (district) of Ternopil Oblast (province) in western Ukraine. It belongs to Buchach urban hromada, one of the hromadas of Ukraine. Strypa River (left tributary of the Dniester river) flows near of the village.

== History ==
First written mention comes from the early 18th century. Then it belonged to the Polish–Lithuanian Commonwealth, from 1772 until 1918 to Austrian (Habsburg monarchy, Austrian Empire, Austria-Hungary) empires, in 1918-1919 to West Ukrainian People's Republic. From 1991 belonged to Ukraine.

Reading room of Ukrainian society Prosvita operated in the village.

Until 18 July 2020, Zelena belonged to Buchach Raion. The raion was abolished in July 2020 as part of the administrative reform of Ukraine, which reduced the number of raions of Ternopil Oblast to three. The area of Buchach Raion was merged into Chortkiv Raion.

== Attractions ==
- Church of the Nativity of the Blessed Virgin Mary (1882, reconcstr. 1990)
- Chapel
- Statue of the Holy Virgin Mary
- Memory Cross after the abolition of serfdom
- Monument to the fallen in the German-Soviet War soldiers villagers (1968)

== People ==
- pr. Vasyl (Limnychenko)
- pr. Yuliian (Dobrylovs'kyi)
- Petro Gadz, Hero of Ukraine.

== Sources ==
- (in Ukrainian) Н. Бойко, Г. Яворський, Зелена // Ternopil Encyclopedic Dictionary: in 4 v. / editorial board: H. Yavorskyi and other, Ternopil: "Zbruch", 2004, V. 1: А—Й, S. 646. — ISBN 966-528-197-6.
- "Zielona, 3, ws, pow. buczacki". Geographical Dictionary of the Kingdom of Poland (in Polish). 14. Warszawa: Kasa im. Józefa Mianowskiego. 1895. p. 597.
