= Rusyliv Falls =

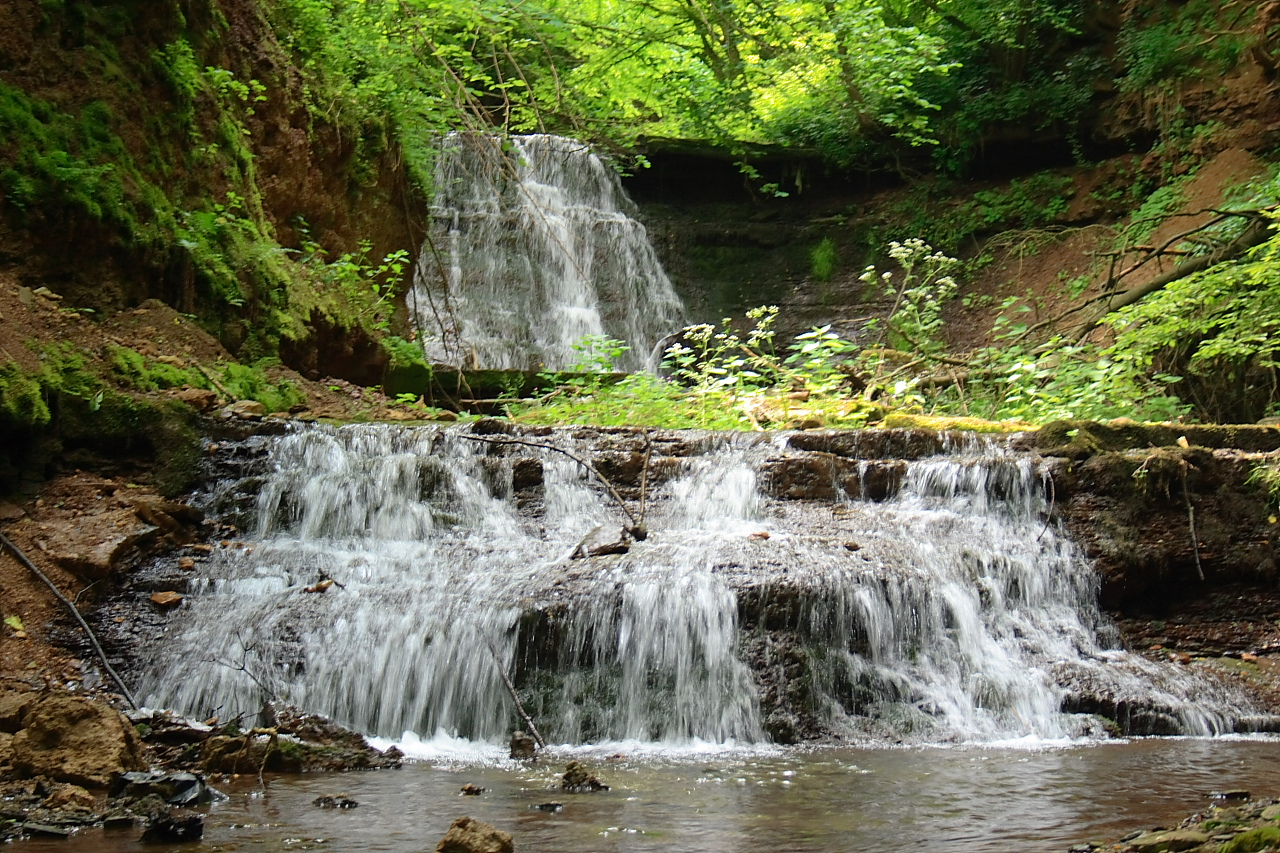

- Location within Ternopil Oblast Location within Ukraine
- Location: Rusyliv, Chortkiv Raion, Ternopil Oblast, Ukraine
- Coordinates: 48°57′07″N 25°23′53″E
- Total height: highest cascade 12 metres (39 ft)
- Watercourse: Rusyliv river

Rusyliv Falls (Ukrainian: Русилівські водоспади) is located on the Rusyliv river in Chortkiv Raion, Ternopil Oblast, Ukraine, a few km to the east from village of Rusyliv. The Rusyliv Falls consist of 15 falls (with height: 1.5–12 m and width: 10–15 m) within 3 km on the Rusyliv river (right tributary of the Strypa River)

== See also ==
- Waterfalls of Ukraine
