= Martynivka, Ternopil Oblast =

Rural locality in Ternopil Oblast, Ukraine

Martynivka Мартинівка
- Location in Ternopil Oblast
- Coordinates: 49°6′33″N 25°31′57″E
- Country: Ukraine
- Oblast: Ternopil Oblast
- Raion: Chortkiv Raion
- Hromada: Trybukhivtsi rural hromada
- Time zone: UTC+2 (EET)
  - Summer (DST): UTC+3 (EEST)
- Postal code: 48414

Martynivka (Ukrainian: Мартинівка) is a village in Trybukhivtsi rural hromada, Chortkiv Raion, Ternopil Oblast, Ukraine.

== History ==
In the second half of the 19th century it was founded as a Polish settlement Wojciechówka (Wojtechówka). From March 1946 it has the present name.

After the liquidation of the Buchach Raion on 19 July 2020, the village became part of the Chortkiv Raion.

== Religion ==
- Church of the Nativity of the Blessed Virgin Mary (reconstructed in 1990 from a Roman Catholic church).

== Sources ==
- (in Ukrainian) Сеник Б., Мартинівка // Ternopil Encyclopedic Dictionary: in 4 v. / editorial board: H. Yavorskyi and other, Ternopil: "Zbruch", 2005, V. 2: К—О, S. 462. — ISBN 966-528-199-2.
- "2.) Janówka, wś, pow. buczacki". Geographical Dictionary of the Kingdom of Poland (in Polish). 3. Warszawa: Kasa im. Józefa Mianowskiego. 1882. p. 432.
