= Zalishchyky (village) =

Zalishchyky Заліщики
- Location within Ukraine Location within Ternopil Oblast
- Coordinates: 48°59′22″N 25°26′39″E
- Country: Ukraine
- Oblast: Ternopil Oblast
- Raion: Chortkiv Raion

Area
  - Total: 1.550 km^{2} (0.598 sq mi)

Population (2003)
  - Total: 473
  - Density: 305.16/km^{2} (790.4/sq mi)
- Time zone: UTC+2 (EET)
  - Summer (DST): UTC+3 (EEST)
- Postal code: 48467
- Area code: +380 3544

Zalishchyky (Ukrainian: Заліщики, Polish: Zaleszczyki) is a village in Chortkiv Raion (district) of Ternopil Oblast (province) in western Ukraine. It belongs to Buchach urban hromada, one of the hromadas of Ukraine. It is sometimes called Mali (Little) Zalishchyky, to distinguish it from the nearby city of Zalishchyky (or Zalishchyky Stare, "Old Zalishchyky"). The small river Yazlovchyk (left tributary of the river Vilkhovets) flows near the village. In 2003, the village had a population of 473.

== History ==
Its first written mention comes from 13 January 1444 in the books of the Galician court, then another mention followed in 1454. After that, it belonged to the Polish–Lithuanian Commonwealth, from 1772 until 1918 to the Austrian (Habsburg monarchy, Austrian Empire, Austria-Hungary) empires, and in 1918-1919 to the West Ukrainian People's Republic. In the interwar period, the village was initially an independent commune in the Second Polish Republic until it was added to the Tarnopol Voivodeship in 1934. After the Soviet annexation of Eastern Galicia and Volhynia in September 1939, it was added to the Ternopil Oblast of the Ukrainian SSR. Since 1991, Zalishchyky has been part of independent Ukraine.

The reading room of Ukrainian society Prosvita operated in the village.

Until 18 July 2020, Zalishchyky belonged to the Buchach Raion. The raion was abolished in July 2020 as part of the administrative reform of Ukraine, which reduced the number of raions of Ternopil Oblast to three. The area of Buchach Raion was merged into Chortkiv Raion.

== Attractions ==
- Church of St. George
- Church of the Blessed Virgin Mary
- Chapel
- Monument to soldiers of Ukrainian Insurgent Army

== People ==
- Bohdan Vandiak, Ukrainian artist, poet
- Antoni Prochaska, Polish historian

== Sources ==
- (in Ukrainian) Б. Таняк, М. Філаченкова, Малі Заліщики // Ternopil Encyclopedic Dictionary: in 4 v. / editorial board: H. Yavorskyi and other, Ternopil: "Zbruch", 2005, V. 2: К—О, S. 447. — ISBN 966-528-199-2.
