= Pyshkivtsi =

Pyshkivtsi Пишківці
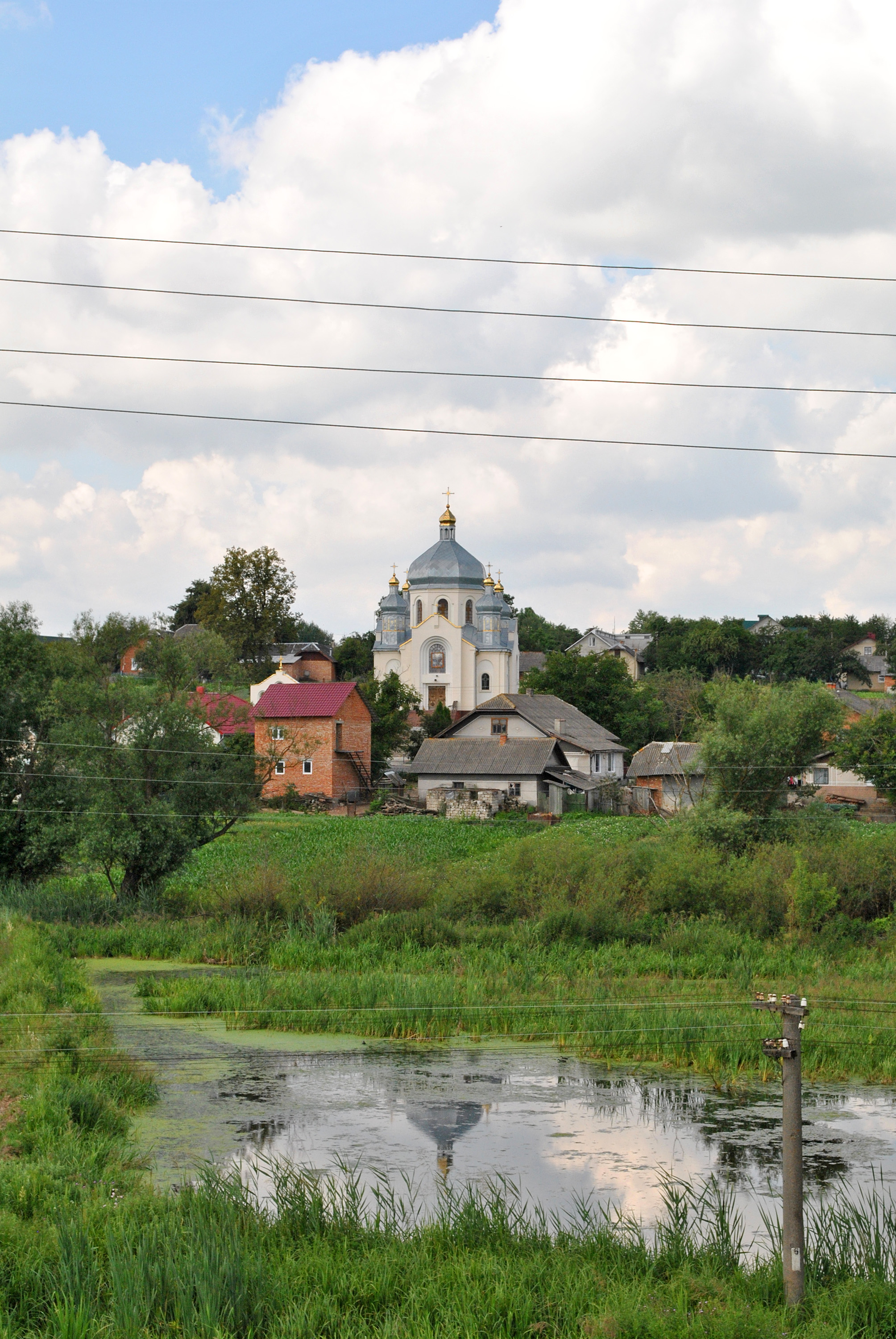
- Interactive map of Pyshkivtsi
- Coordinates: 49°03′20″N 25°26′05″E
- Country: Ukraine
- Oblast: Ternopil Oblast
- Raion: Chortkiv Raion

Area
  - Total: 3.037 km^{2} (1.173 sq mi)

Population (2023)
  - Total: 1,227
  - Density: 421.14/km^{2} (1,090.7/sq mi)
- Time zone: UTC+2 (EET)
  - Summer (DST): UTC+3 (EEST)
- Postal code: 48467
- Area code: +380 3544

Pyshkivtsi (Ukrainian: Пишківці) is a village in Chortkiv Raion (district) of Ternopil Oblast (province) in western Ukraine. It belongs to Trybukhivtsi rural hromada, one of the hromadas of Ukraine.

== History ==
First written mention comes from the 15th century. Then Pyshkivtsi belonged to the Kingdom of Poland, from 1569 to the Polish–Lithuanian Commonwealth, from 1772 until 1918 to the Kingdom of Galicia and Lodomeria (part of Austrian empires, f. e. Austrian-Hungarian empire), in 1918-1919 to West Ukrainian People's Republic.

Until 18 July 2020, Pyshkivtsi belonged to Buchach Raion. The raion was abolished in July 2020 as part of the administrative reform of Ukraine, which reduced the number of raions of Ternopil Oblast to three. The area of Buchach Raion was merged into Chortkiv Raion.

== Sources ==
- (in Ukrainian) В. Курцеба, В. Уніят, Пишківці // Ternopil Encyclopedic Dictionary: in 4 v. / editorial board: H. Yavorskyi and other, Ternopil: "Zbruch", 2008, V. 3: П—Я, S. 69. — ISBN 978-966-528-279-2.
