= Pyliava, Ternopil Oblast =

Rural locality in Ternopil Oblast, Ukraine

Pyliava Пилява
- Location in Ternopil Oblast
- Coordinates: 49°6′46″N 25°28′20″E
- Country: Ukraine
- Oblast: Ternopil Oblast
- Raion: Chortkiv Raion
- Hromada: Trybukhivtsi rural hromada
- Time zone: UTC+2 (EET)
  - Summer (DST): UTC+3 (EEST)
- Postal code: 48414

Pyliava (Ukrainian: Пилява) is a village in Trybukhivtsi rural hromada, Chortkiv Raion, Ternopil Oblast, Ukraine.

== History ==
It is known from the 15th century.

After the liquidation of the Buchach Raion on 19 July 2020, the village became part of the Chortkiv Raion.

== Religion ==
- two churches of St. Paraskeva (1990, dedicated in 1993, OCU; 1996, dedicated in 1998, UGCC).
- Roman Catholic chapel (1935).

== Sources ==
- (in Ukrainian) Мельничук Б., Сеник Б., Пилява // Ternopil Encyclopedic Dictionary: in 4 v. / editorial board: H. Yavorskyi and other, Ternopil: "Zbruch", 2008, V. 3: П—Я, S. 66. — ISBN 978-966-528-279-2.
- "Pielawa". Geographical Dictionary of the Kingdom of Poland (in Polish). 8. Warszawa: Kasa im. Józefa Mianowskiego. 1887. p. 84.
