= Tsvitova, Ternopil Oblast =

Rural locality in Ternopil Oblast, Ukraine

Tsvitova Цвітова
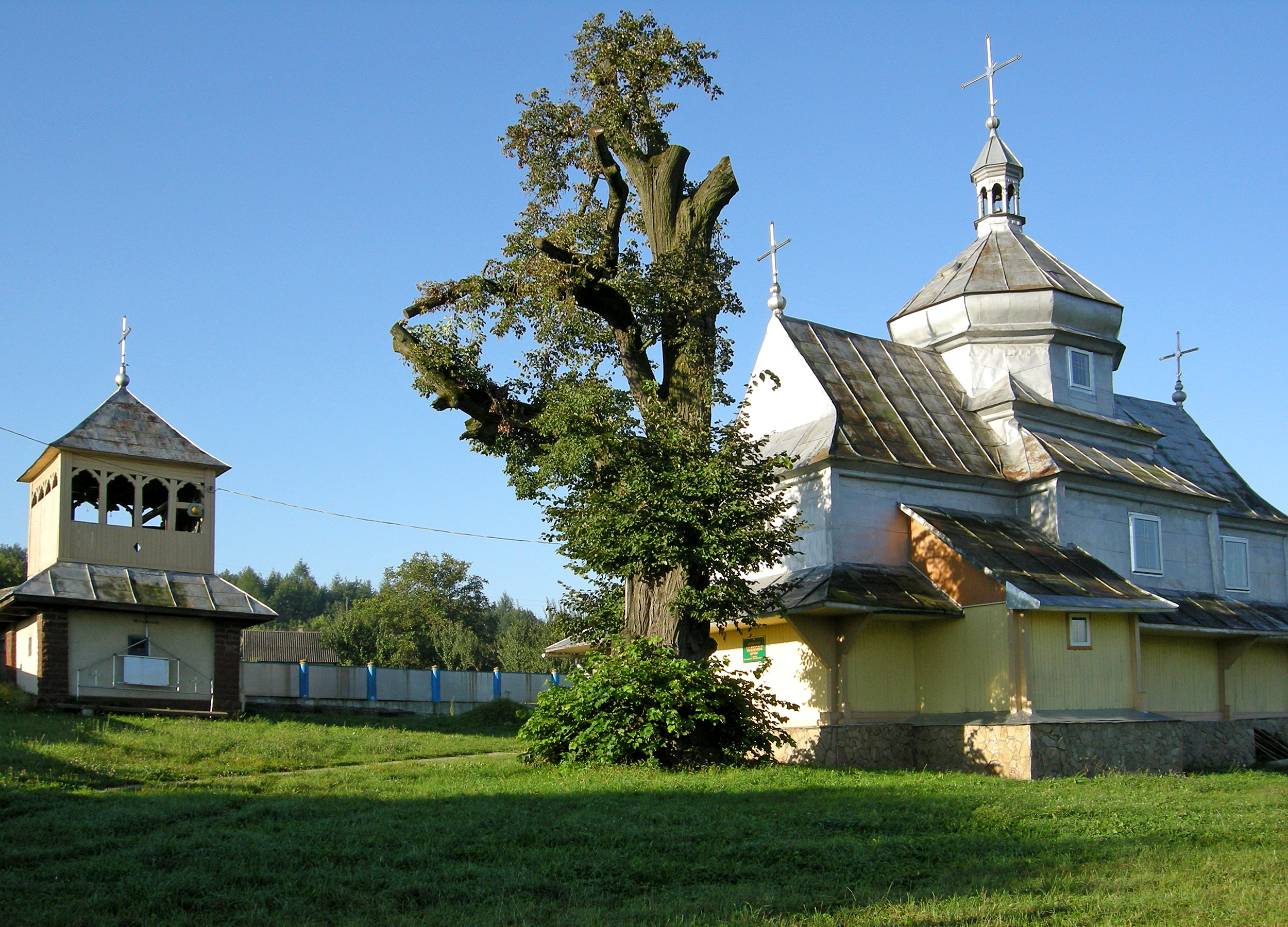
- Architectural monument of local importance, wooden church of the Introduction to the Temple of the Most Holy Theotokos and natural monument of local importance "Tsvitova Linden" in the village of Tsvitova, Buchach district, Ternopil region.

- Location in Ternopil Oblast
- Coordinates: 49°1′40″N 25°27′21″E
- Country: Ukraine
- Oblast: Ternopil Oblast
- Raion: Chortkiv Raion
- Hromada: Trybukhivtsi rural hromada
- Time zone: UTC+2 (EET)
  - Summer (DST): UTC+3 (EEST)
- Postal code: 48433

Tsvitova (Ukrainian: Цвітова) is a village in Trybukhivtsi rural hromada, Chortkiv Raion, Ternopil Oblast, Ukraine.

== History ==
In 1937, a burial site of ancient Rus' culture was discovered near the village.

After the liquidation of the Buchach Raion on 19 July 2020, the village became part of the Chortkiv Raion.

== Religion ==
- Church of the Presentation of the Blessed Virgin Mary (1888, wooden).

== Sources ==
- (in Ukrainian) Мельничук Б., Уніят Б., Цвітова // Ternopil Encyclopedic Dictionary: in 4 v. / editorial board: H. Yavorskyi and other, Ternopil: "Zbruch", 2008, V. 3: П—Я, S. 566–567. — ISBN 978-966-528-279-2.
- "Ćwitowa, 1) wieś, pow. buczacki". Geographical Dictionary of the Kingdom of Poland (in Polish). 1. Warszawa: Kasa im. Józefa Mianowskiego. 1880. p. 717.
