= Novostavtsi, Ternopil Oblast =

Rural locality in Ternopil Oblast, Ukraine

Novostavtsi Новоставці
- Location in Ternopil Oblast
- Coordinates: 49°5′52″N 25°26′6″E
- Country: Ukraine
- Oblast: Ternopil Oblast
- Raion: Chortkiv Raion
- Hromada: Trybukhivtsi rural hromada
- Time zone: UTC+2 (EET)
  - Summer (DST): UTC+3 (EEST)
- Postal code: 48414

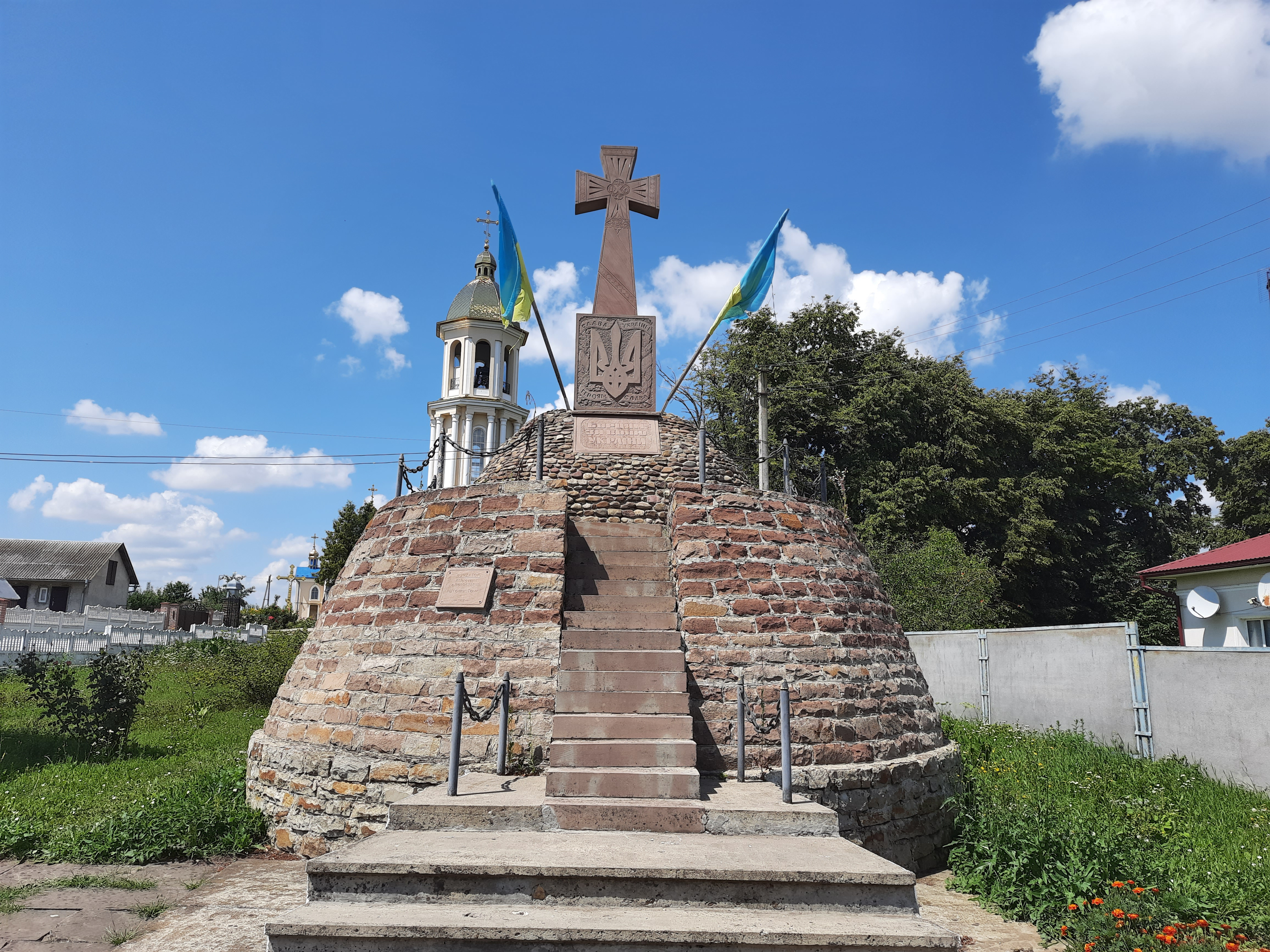
War Memorial in the village

Novostavtsi (Ukrainian: Новоставці) is a village in Trybukhivtsi rural hromada, Chortkiv Raion, Ternopil Oblast, Ukraine.

== History ==
The village was first mentioned in writings in 1420.

After the liquidation of the Buchach Raion on 19 July 2020, the village became part of the Chortkiv Raion.

== Religion ==
- Saint Nicholas church (1835, brick, reconstructed in 1906, 1990, OCU),
- Saint Thomas the Apostle church (2001, brick, UGCC),
- Saint John of Kent church (1882, RCC).

== Sources ==
- (in Ukrainian) Гаврилюк О., Сеник Б., Яворський Г., Новоставці // Ternopil Encyclopedic Dictionary: in 4 v. / editorial board: H. Yavorskyi and other, Ternopil: "Zbruch", 2005, V. 2: К—О, S. 643. — ISBN 966-528-199-2.
- "Nowostawce (4), wś, pow. buczacki". Geographical Dictionary of the Kingdom of Poland (in Polish). 7. Warszawa: Kasa im. Józefa Mianowskiego. 1886. p. 289.
