= Beremiany, Ternopil Oblast =

Beremiany Берем'яни
- Interactive map of Beremiany
- Coordinates: 48°53′11″N 25°26′51″E
- Country: Ukraine
- Oblast: Ternopil Oblast
- Raion: Chortkiv Raion

Population (2001 census)
  - Total: 700
- Time zone: UTC+2 (EET)
  - Summer (DST): UTC+3 (EEST)
- Postal code: 48464
- Area code: +380 3544

Beremiany (Ukrainian: Берем'яни) is a village in Chortkiv Raion (district) of Ternopil Oblast (province) in western Ukraine. It belongs to Buchach urban hromada, one of the hromadas of Ukraine.

Until 18 July 2020, Beremiany belonged to Buchach Raion. The raion was abolished in July 2020 as part of the administrative reform of Ukraine, which reduced the number of raions of Ternopil Oblast to three. The area of Buchach Raion was merged into Chortkiv Raion.

== Notable people ==
- Kornel Ujejski, Polish poet and political writer.

== Gallery ==
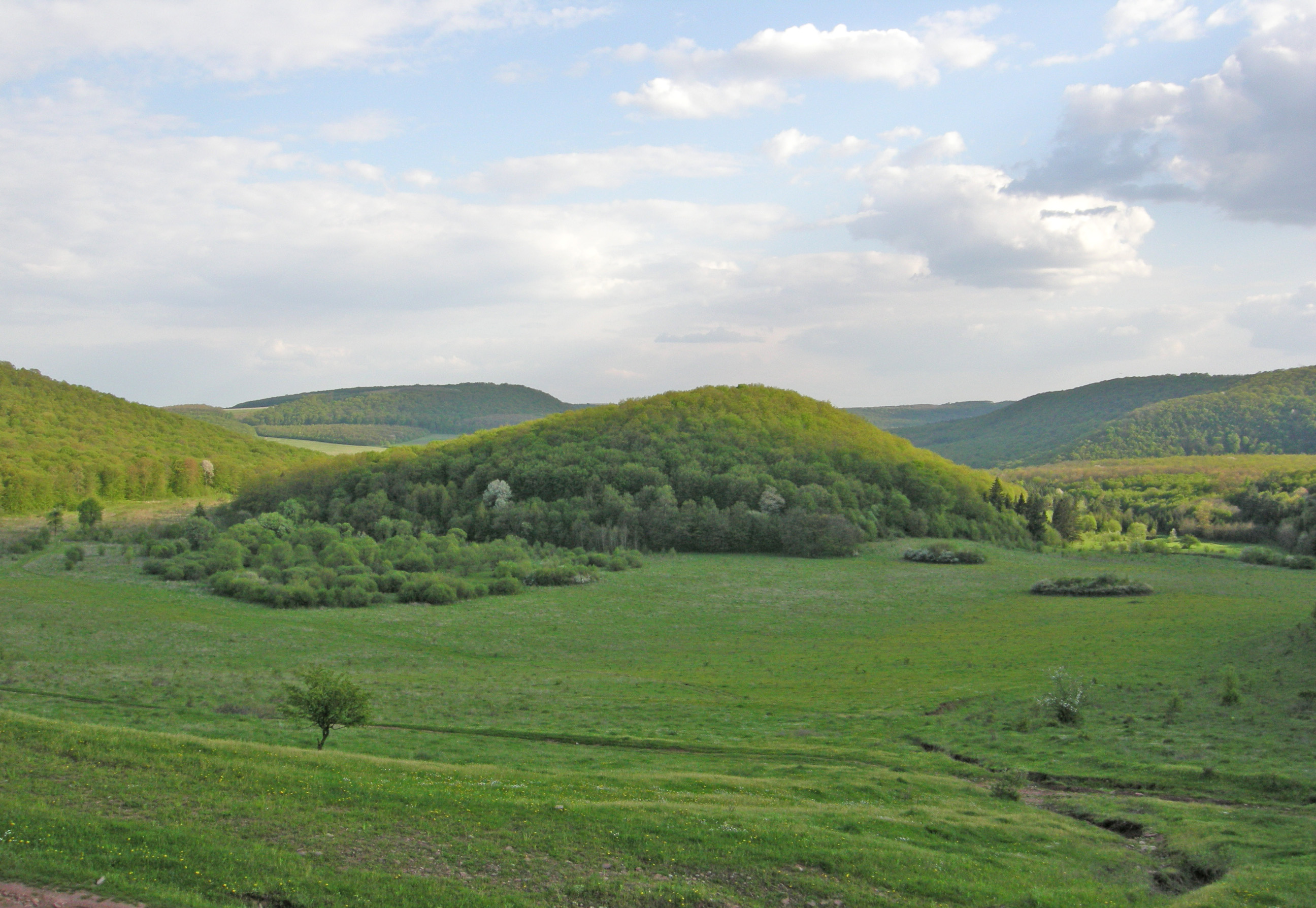
Mountain Velyka Govda

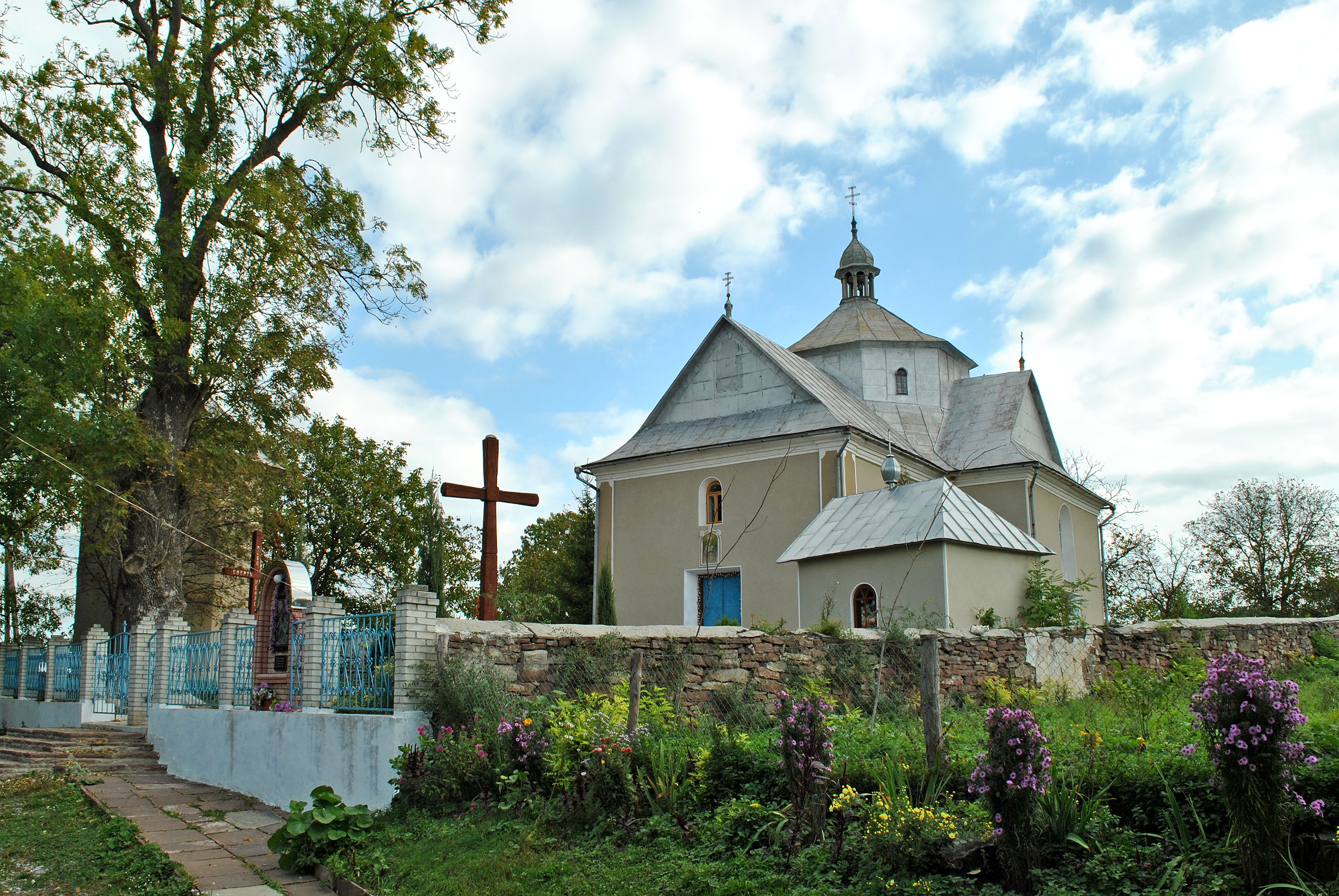
Saint Nicolas church

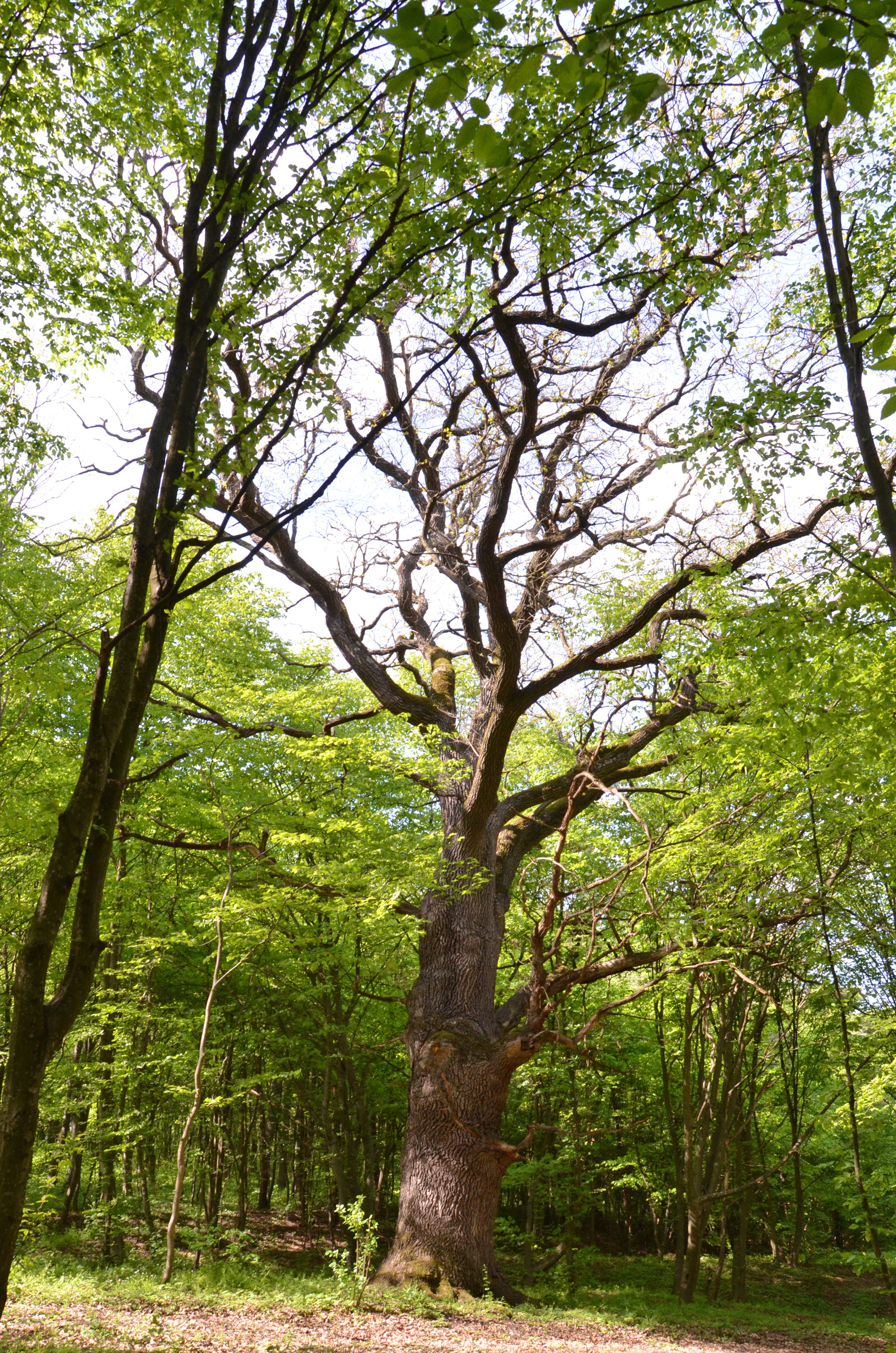
Natural heritage site "Beremiany Quercus"

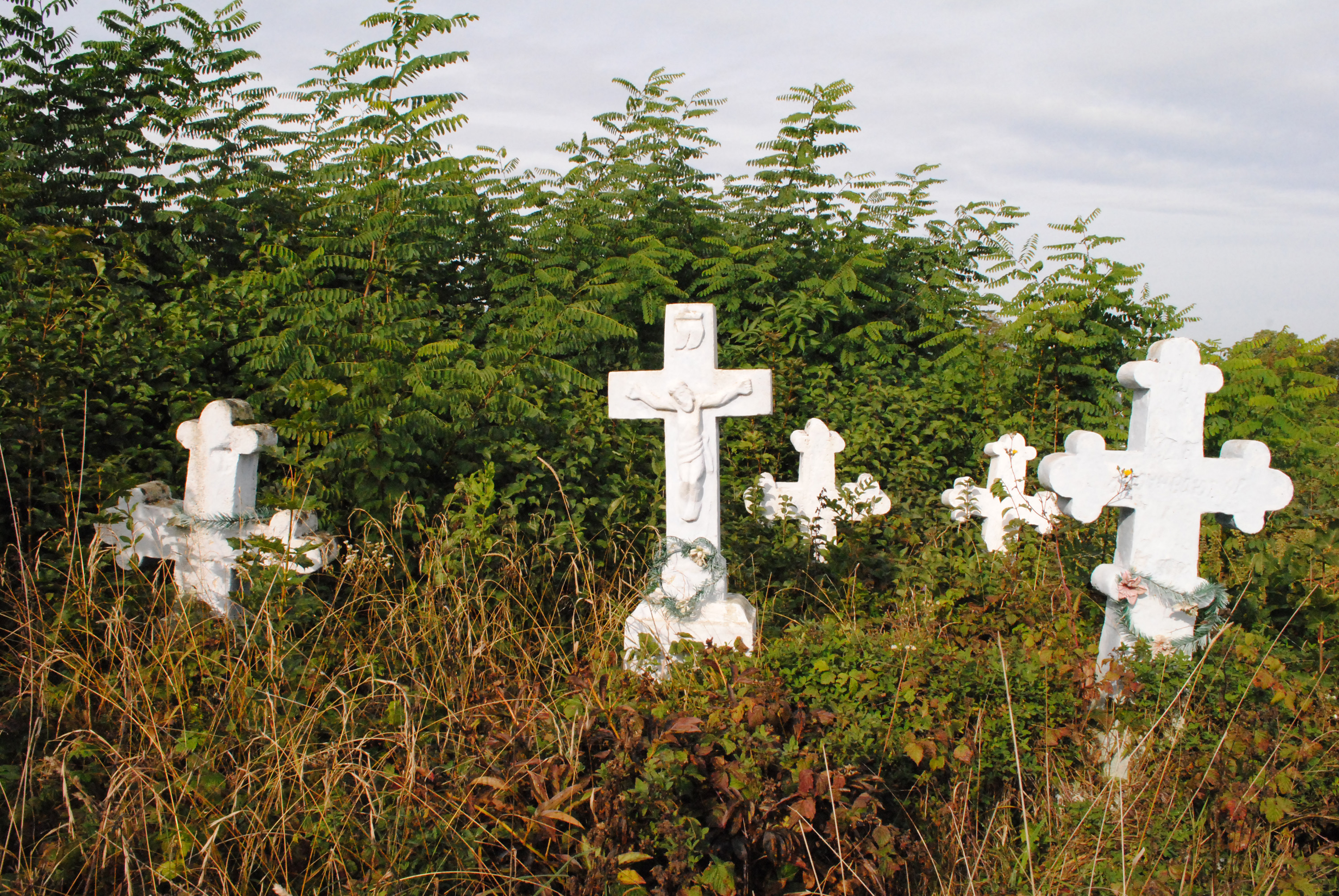
Cultural heritage monument of history "Ukrainian-Polish Cemetery"

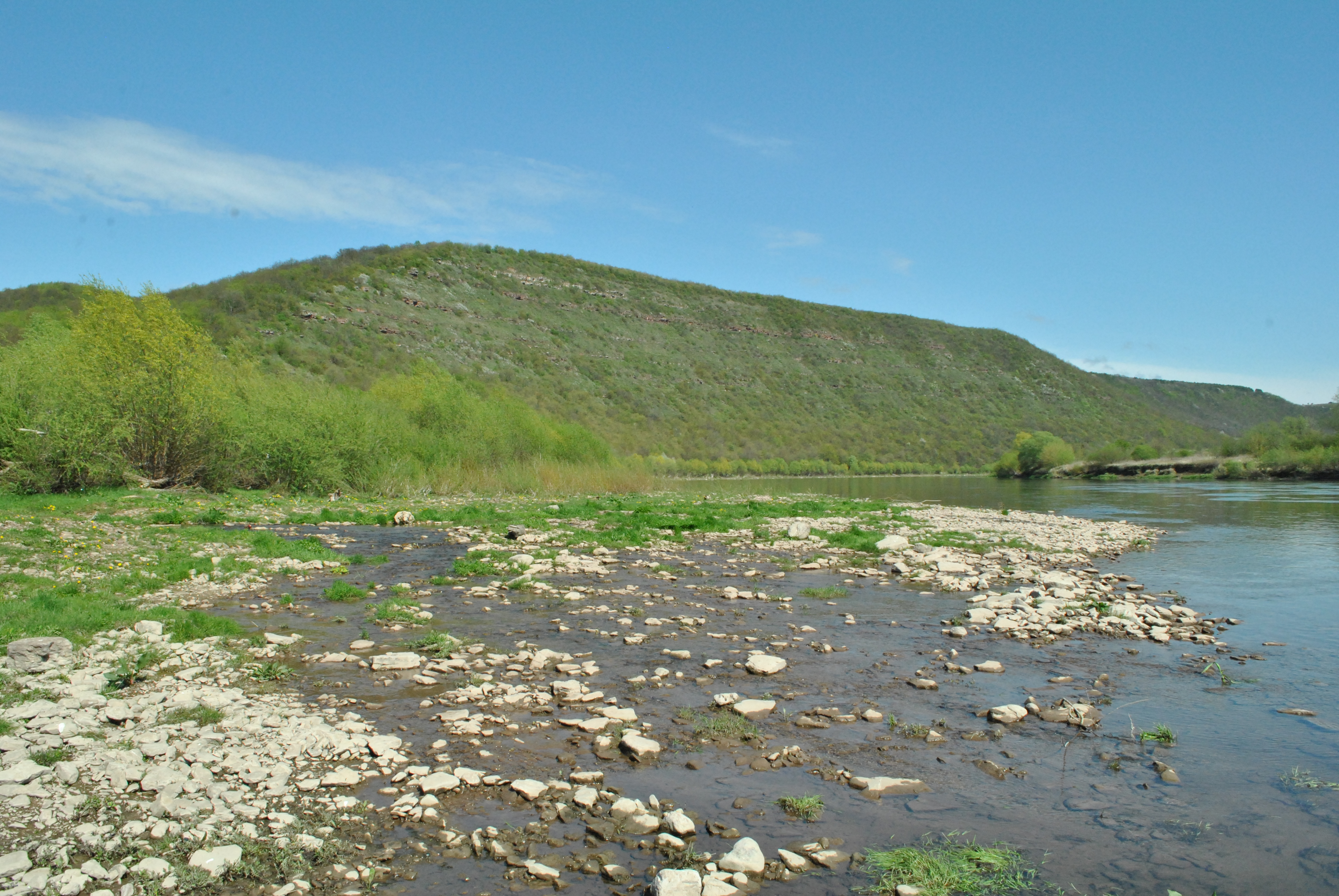
Dniester Canyon near Beremiany
