= Medvedivtsi =

Medvedivtsi may refer to these villages in Ukraine.

- Medvedivtsi, Buchach Raion
- Medvedivtsi, Mukacheve Raion
