= Pidzamochok Castle =

Ruined castle in Ukraine

Coordinates: 49°04′44.54″N 25°23′55.90″E

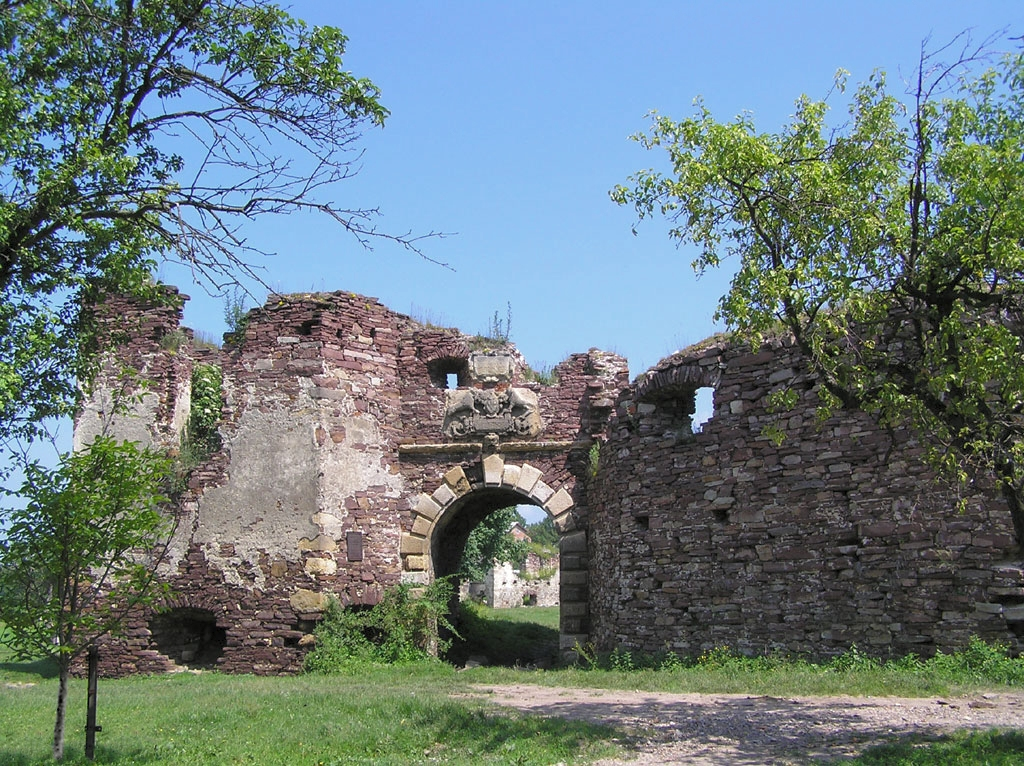

Site information
- Type: Castle

Immovable Monument of National Significance of Ukraine
- Official name: Замок (Castle)
- Type: Architecture
- Reference no.: 190018

The Pidzamochok Castle (Ukrainian: Підзамочківський замок, romanized: Pidzamochkivs'kyi zamok) is a ruined castle, dating c. 1600, located in Pidzamochok, Chortkiv Raion, Ternopil Oblast, Ukraine. Its founder is Jan Zbożny (Tworowski-Buczacki).

It was built by the Tworowski-Buchacki family. It was rebuilt by the Potocki-Movile family in the 16th–17th centuries in the Renaissance style. It was a defensive structure, and saw combat several times. It fell into disrepair following its destruction by the Ottomans in the late 17th century. During the 19th century, while in the Austrian Partition (following the partitions of Poland) it was partially demolished to reclaim building material. Now it is a tourist attraction and the castle ruins are open to visitors. The castle is managed by the Castles of Ternopil Oblast National Reserve.

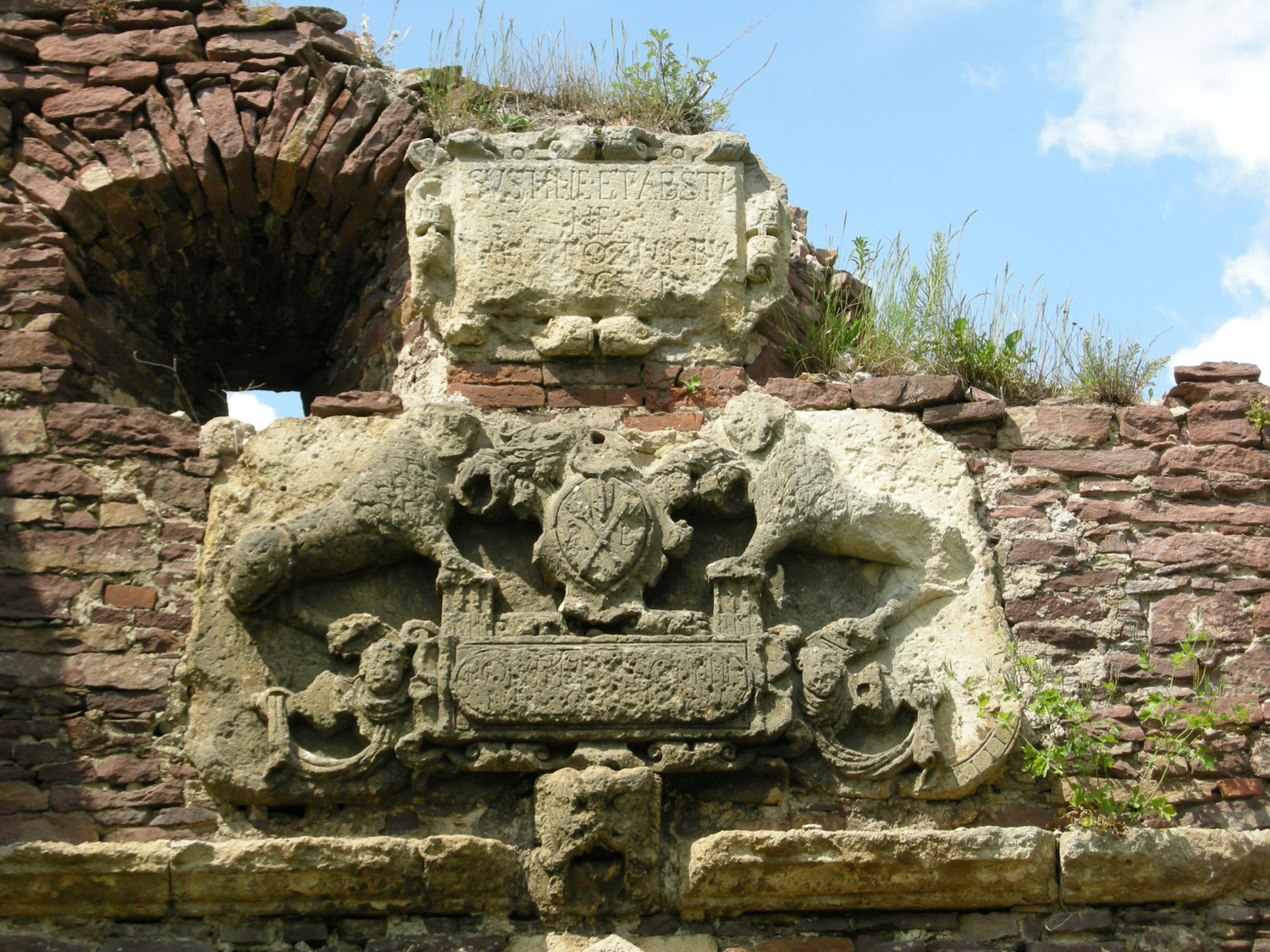

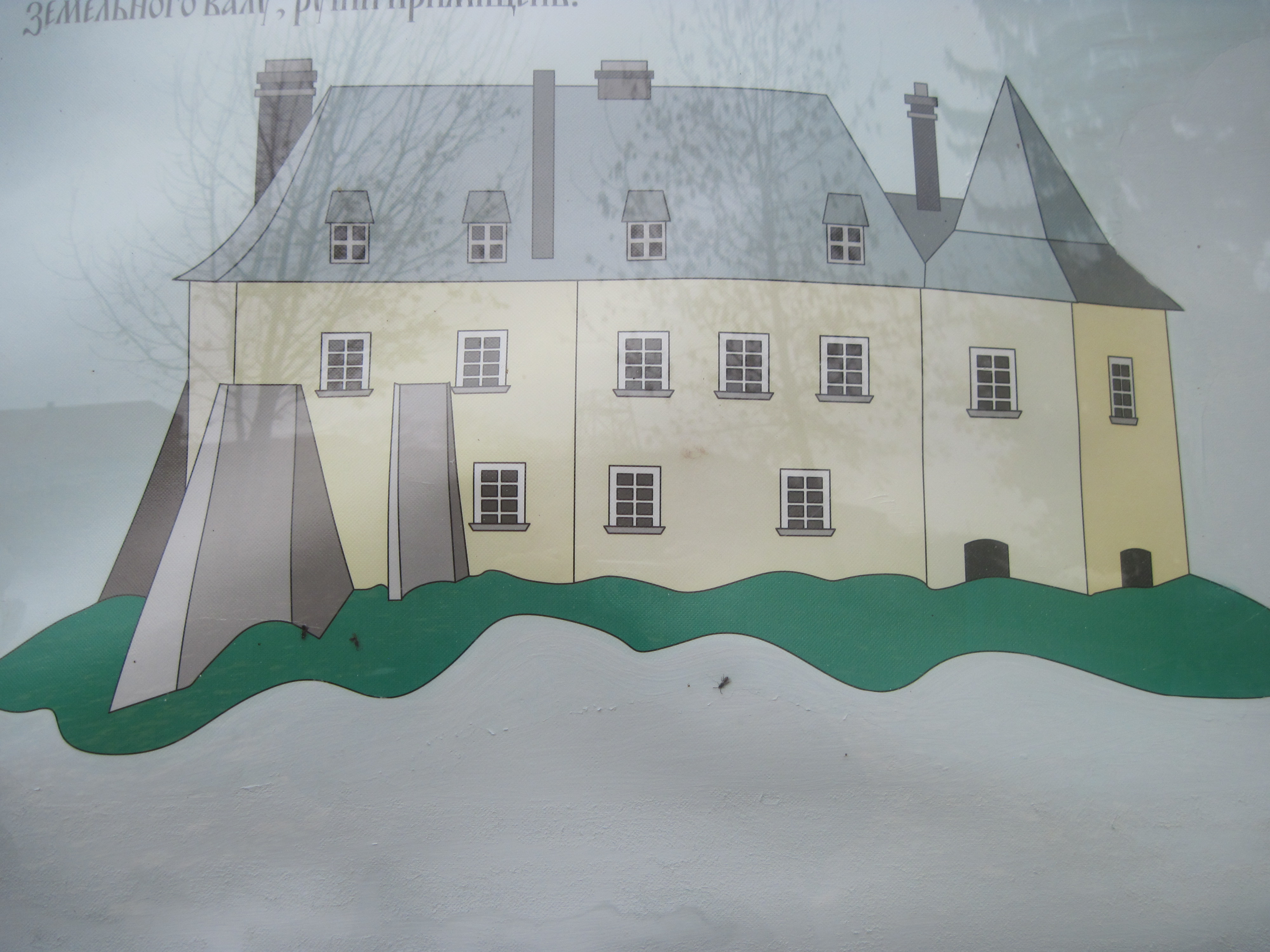

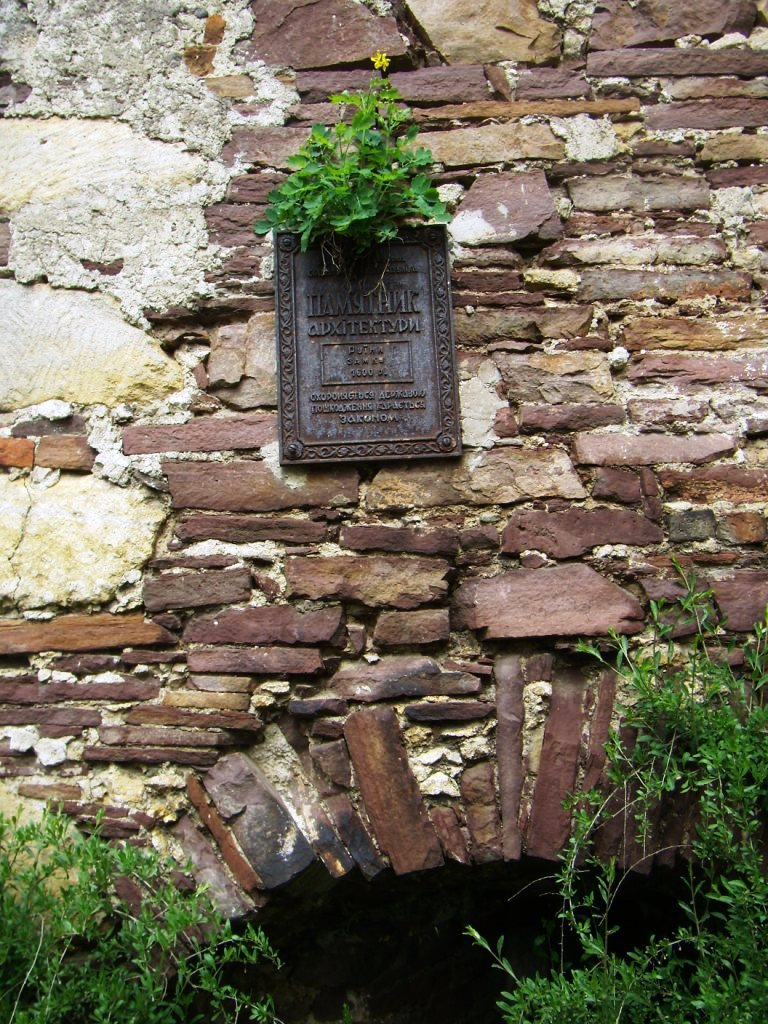

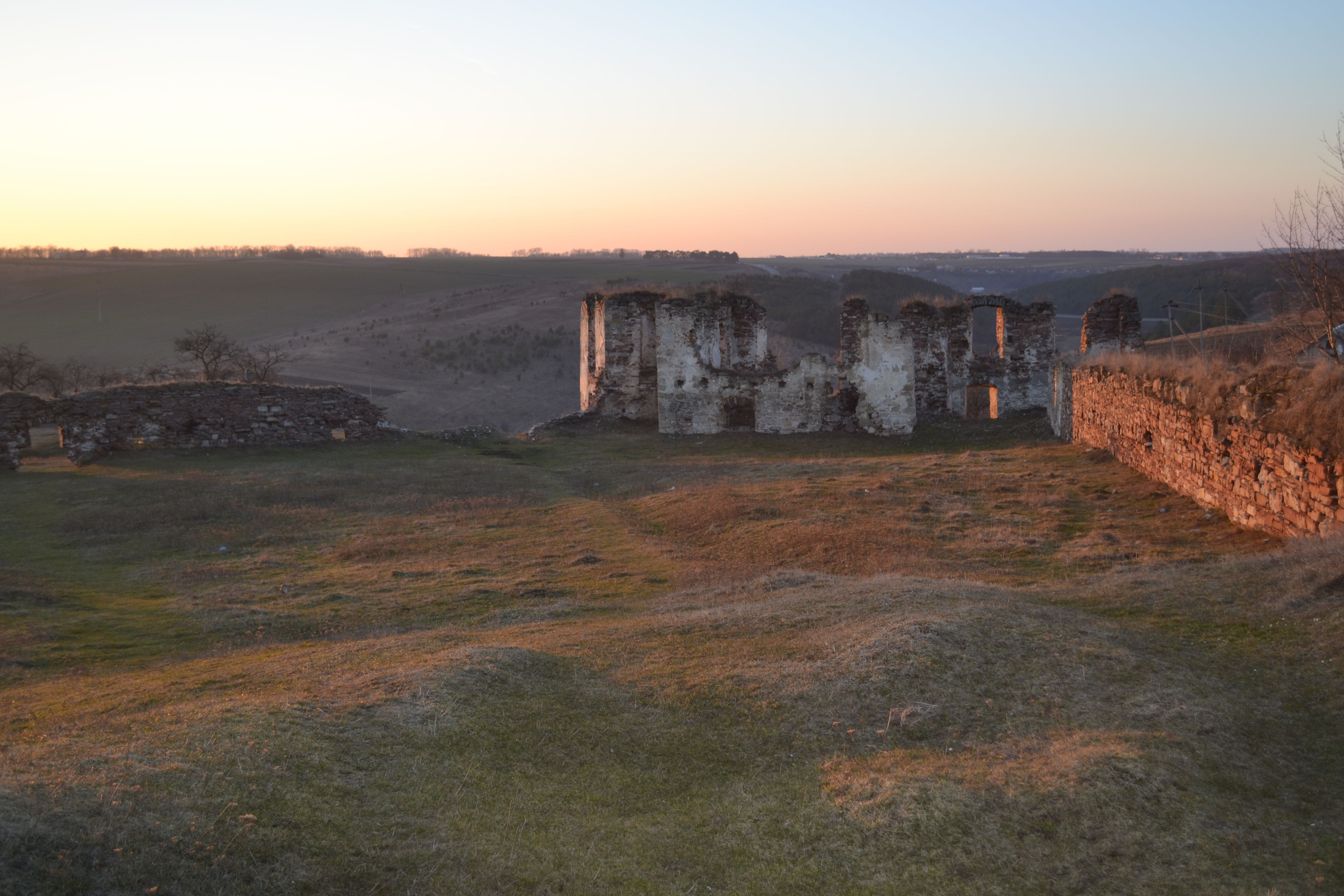

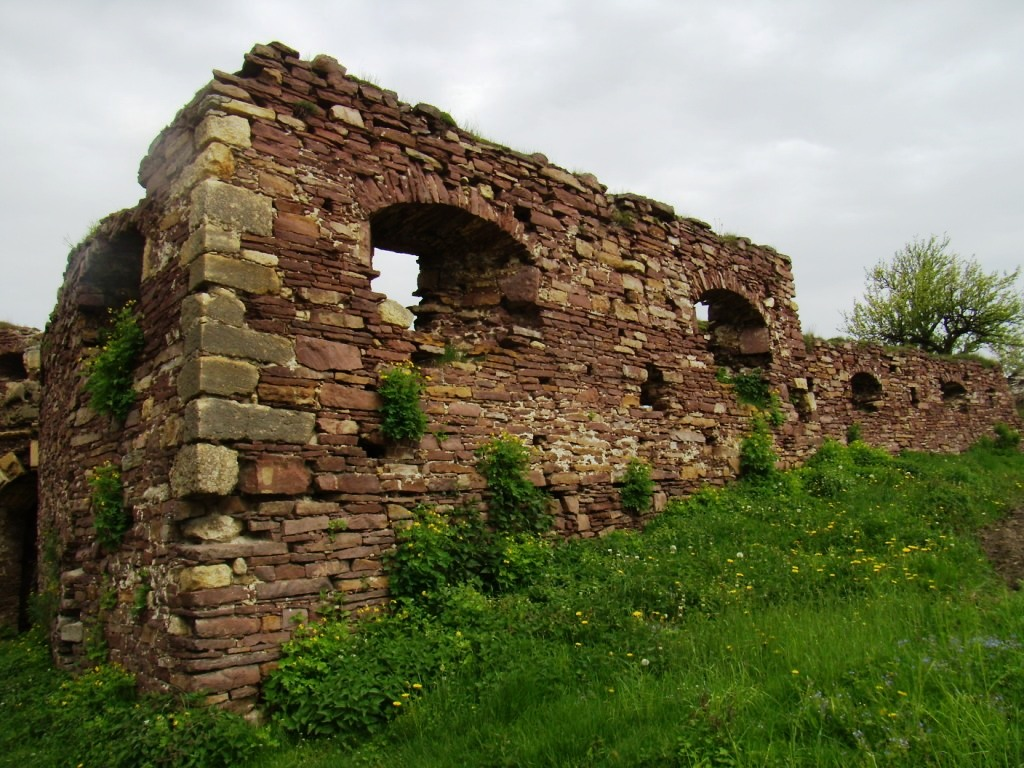

== Sources ==
- (in Polish) Stanisław Sławomir Nicieja, Twierdze kresowe Rzeczypospolitej, Wydawnictwo Iskry, Warszawa 2006. ISBN 83-244-0024-9
- (in Ukrainian) Створено графічну реконструкцію зовнішнього вигляду зруйнованих замків Західної України
- (in Ukrainian) Підзамочківський замок // Сайт с. Підзамочок.
