= Rusyliv =

Rusyliv may refer to the following villages in the Western Ukraine:

- Rusyliv, Ternopil Oblast, Ternopil Oblast
- Rusyliv, Lviv Oblast, Lviv Oblast
