= Monastyrsky =

Monastyrsky (Russian: Монастырский) may refer to:

- Monastyrsky (surname)
- Monastyrsky, Bryansk Oblast, a settlement
- Monastyrsky, Medvensky District, Kursk Oblast, a khutor
- Monastyrsky, Oboyansky District, Kursk Oblast, a khutor
- Monastyrsky, Samara Oblast, a settlement
- Monastyrsky, Saratov Oblast, a settlement
- Monastyrsky, Tula Oblast, a settlement
- Monastyrskyi Island, Ukraine

== See also ==
- Monastyrskaya (disambiguation)
- Monastyrskoye (disambiguation)
