= Trybukhivtsi, Trybukhivtsi rural hromada, Chortkiv Raion, Ternopil Oblast =

Trybukhivtsi Трибухівці
- Village
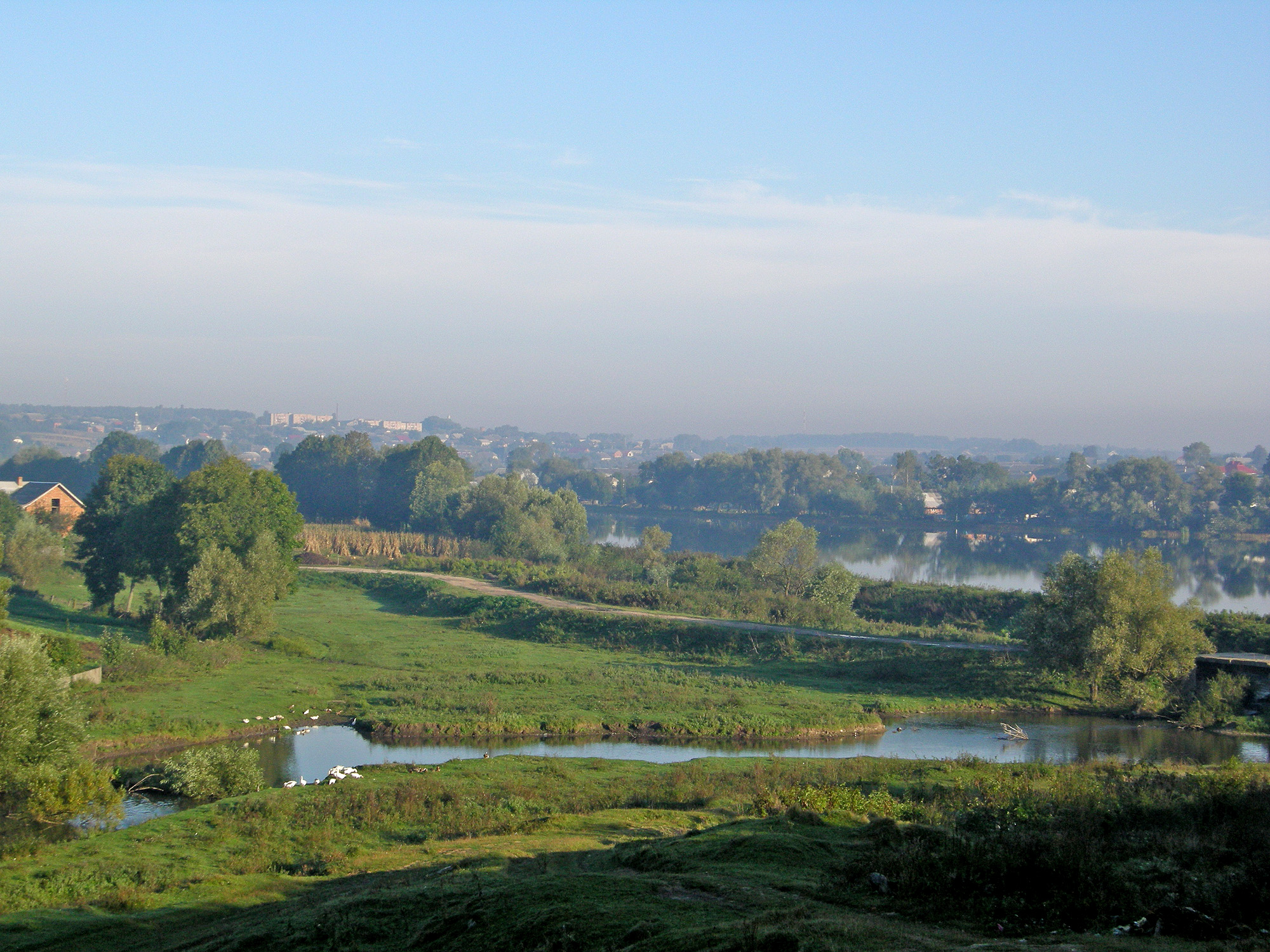

- Location within Ternopil Oblast
- Coordinates: 49°02′28″N 25°27′36″E
- Country: Ukraine
- Oblast: Ternopil Oblast
- District: Chortkiv Raion
- Established: 1578

Area
  - Total: 7.900 km^{2} (3.050 sq mi)
- Elevation: 333 m (1,093 ft)

Population
  - Total: 3,694
  - Density: 467.6/km^{2} (1,211/sq mi)
- Time zone: UTC+2 (EET)
  - Summer (DST): UTC+3 (EEST)
- Postal code: 48431
- Area code: +380 3544
- Website: село Трибухівці (in Ukrainian)

Trybukhivtsi (Ukrainian: Трибухі́вці) is a village in Chortkiv Raion of Ternopil Oblast (province of western Ukraine). It hosts the administration of Trybukhivtsi rural hromada, one of the hromadas of Ukraine. The small villages Zanyvo and Poperechky are a part of the village. Its local government is administered by Trybukhivska village council, and the population of the village is about 3 694 people.

== Geography ==
The village is situated in the east of Buchach Raion, it is located on the banks of the river Vilhovets.
The village is located at a distance of 8 kilometres (5.0 mi) from the district center of Buchach along the road Highway T2001 (Ukraine) from Buchach to Chortkiv. A distance to the regional center Ternopil is 71 kilometres (44 mi) and 28 kilometres (17 mi) from Chortkiv.

== History ==
The first settlements emerged in the second half of the Neolithic period.

The first written mention record dates from the 1578. Then it belonged to the Polish–Lithuanian Commonwealth, from 1772 until 1918 to Austrian (Habsburg monarchy, Austrian Empire, Austria-Hungary) empires, in 1918-1919 to West Ukrainian People's Republic. From 1991 belonged to Ukraine.

The first owners of the village were Buczacki, then - Stanislav Golski,
Potocki.

Until 18 July 2020, Trybukhivtsi belonged to Buchach Raion. The raion was abolished in July 2020 as part of the administrative reform of Ukraine, which reduced the number of raions of Ternopil Oblast to three. The area of Buchach Raion was merged into Chortkiv Raion.

== Attractions ==
Great heritage is in the village. This is:

- Church of Annunciation Virgin (16-17 centuries. Wood)
- Church of St. Paraskeva (1847, rebuilt in 1994, stone)
- Church of the Assumption of the Blessed Virgin Mary (1926, stone)
- Roman Catholic Church of Our Lady of Perpetual Help

== Sources ==
- (in Ukrainian) В. Уніят, Г. Яворський, Трибухівці // Ternopil Encyclopedic Dictionary: in 4 v. / editorial board: H. Yavorskyi and other, Ternopil: "Zbruch", 2008, V. 3: П—Я, S. 467. — ISBN 978-966-528-279-2.
- "Trybuchówce (2)". Geographical Dictionary of the Kingdom of Poland (in Polish). 12. Warszawa: Kasa im. Józefa Mianowskiego. 1892. p. 527.
