= Medvedivtsi, Ternopil Oblast =

Medvedivtsi Медведівці
- Interactive map of Medvedivtsi
- Coordinates: 49°05′29″N 25°26′38″E
- Country: Ukraine
- Oblast: Ternopil Oblast
- Raion: Chortkiv Raion

Area
  - Total: 2.990 km^{2} (1.154 sq mi)

Population (2001 census)
  - Total: 1,280
  - Density: 428.09/km^{2} (1,108.7/sq mi)
- Time zone: UTC+2 (EET)
  - Summer (DST): UTC+3 (EEST)
- Postal code: 48414
- Area code: +380 3544

Medvedivtsi (Ukrainian: Медведівці) is a village in Chortkiv Raion (district) of Ternopil Oblast (province) in western Ukraine. It belongs to Trybukhivtsi rural hromada, one of the hromadas of Ukraine. The Vilkhovets River flows through the village. In 2001, the village had 1,280 residents, and 1,229 in 2023.

== History ==
The first written mention of Medvedivtsi is in the 17th century, when it belonged to the Polish-Lithuanian Commonwealth. From 1772 until 1918 it was part of the Austro-Hungarian Habsburg Empire, as the Kingdom of Galicia and Lodomeria. In 1918-1919 it was part of the short-lived West Ukrainian People's Republic. After 1991 it belonged to newly independent Ukraine, having previously been part of the USSR, and before WWII it was a part of Poland. Reading room of Ukrainian society Prosvita operated in the village.

Until 18 July 2020, Medvedivtsi belonged to Buchach Raion. The raion was abolished in July 2020 as part of the administrative reform of Ukraine, which reduced the number of raions of Ternopil Oblast to three. The area of Buchach Raion was merged into Chortkiv Raion.

== Attractions ==
- Church of the Assumption (1827)
- Chapel of St. Nicholas (1729)
- Statue of Holy Virgin (2004)
- Symbolic grave of fighters for freedom of Ukraine
- Memorial cross in honor of the 3rd anniversary of Ukraine's independence and the revival of the UGCC (1993, project of Hankevych V., height 1.80, red stone)

== Sources ==
- (in Ukrainian) М. Бігус, К. Вербицька, Н. Когут, Медведівці // Ternopil Encyclopedic Dictionary: in 4 v. / editorial board: H. Yavorskyi and other, Ternopil: "Zbruch", 2005, V. 2: К—О, S. 484-485. — ISBN 966-528-199-2.
