= Rusyliv, Ternopil Oblast =

Rural locality in Ternopil Oblast, Ukraine

Rusyliv Русилів
- Location in Ternopil Oblast
- Coordinates: 48°57′14″N 25°23′30″E
- Country: Ukraine
- Oblast: Ternopil Oblast
- Raion: Chortkiv Raion
- Hromada: Zolotyi Potik settlement hromada
- Time zone: UTC+2 (EET)
  - Summer (DST): UTC+3 (EEST)
- Postal code: 48444

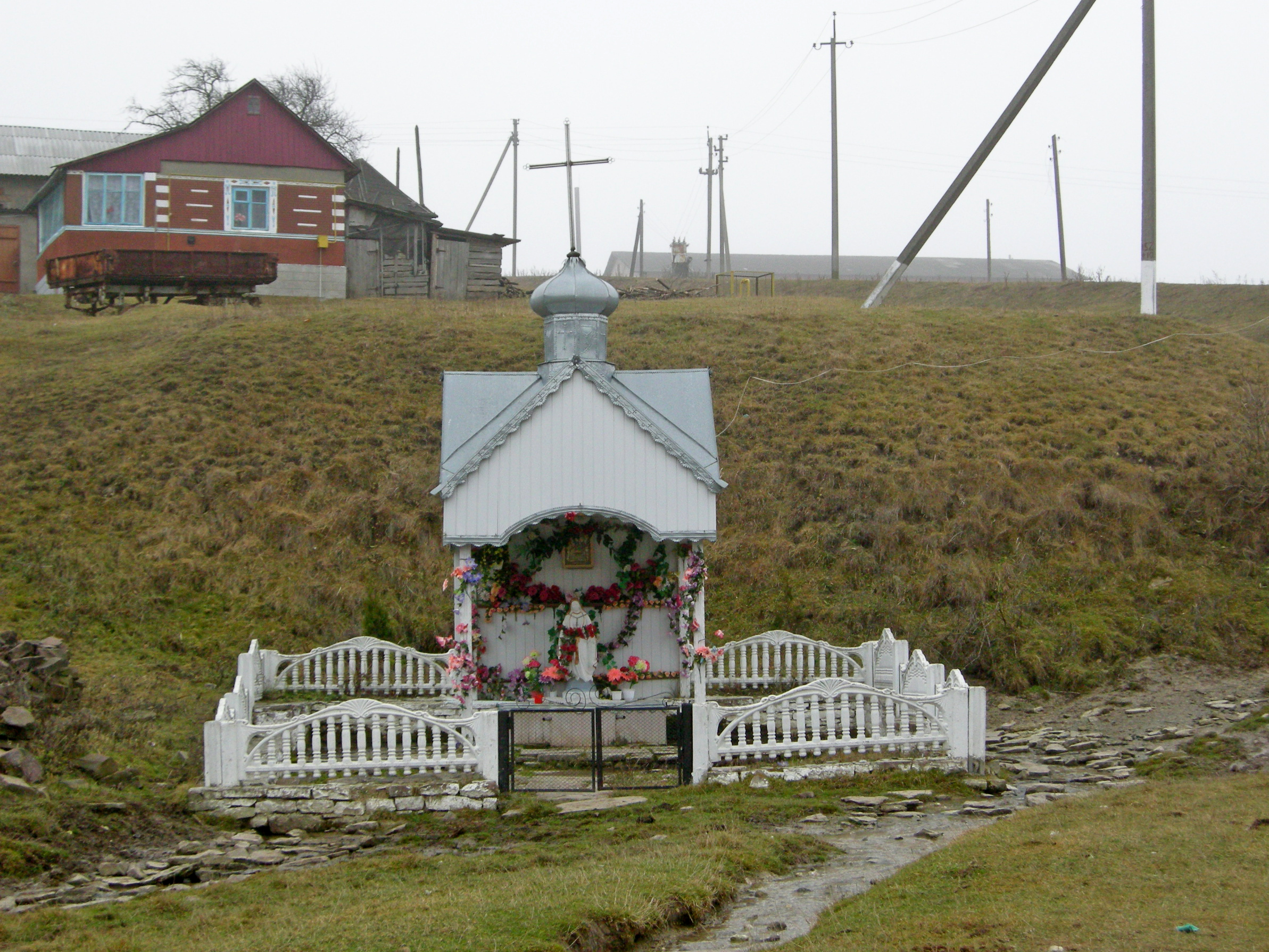
Chapel in Rusyliv, Buchach district, Ternopil region

Rusyliv (Ukrainian: Русилів) is a village in Zolotyi Potik settlement hromada, Chortkiv Raion, Ternopil Oblast, Ukraine.

Near the village there is a natural monument of local importance – Rusyliv Falls.

== History ==
It was first mentioned in writings in 1621.

After the liquidation of the Buchach Raion on 19 July 2020, the village became part of the Chortkiv Raion.

== Religion ==
- Church of the Nativity of the Blessed Virgin Mary (1990).

== Sources ==
- (in Ukrainian) Кравчук С., Уніят В., Русилів // Ternopil Encyclopedic Dictionary: in 4 v. / editorial board: H. Yavorskyi and other, Ternopil: "Zbruch", 2008, V. 3: П—Я, S. 209. — ISBN 978-966-528-279-2.
