= Monastyrskoye =

Monastyrskoye may refer to:

- Former name of Turukhansk, Russia
- A village merged into Prokopyevsk, Russia
- Lake Monastyrskoye, Krasnoyarsk Krai, Russia
- Lake Monastyrskoye, Onezhsky District, Russia
- Lake Monastyrskoye, Kargopolsky District, Russia

== See also ==
- Monastyrsky (disambiguation)
- Monastyrskaya (disambiguation)
