= Antoni Prochaska =

Polish historian

Antoni Prochaska (24 May 1852 – 23 September 1930) was a Polish historian. He was born in a village of Zalishchyky, Austrian Empire (now Chortkiv Raion, Ternopil Oblast) the oldest son of Andrzej, a ranger, and Angieszka.

He worked as an archivist in the Archiwum Akt Grodzkich i Ziemskich we Lwowie from 1878 to 1929. Antoni Prochaska was member of the Academy of Learning since 1893.

In 1929 he was awarded by the Officer's Cross of the Order of Polonia Restituta.

== Publications ==
- Wyprawa na Smoleńsk: (z listów litewskiego kanclerza r. 1609-1611), 1911
- Sejmik wiszeński 1503 r., 1922
- Hołdy mazowieckie 1386-1430

== Sources ==
- (in Ukrainian) В. Барна, С. Ткачов, Прохаска Антоній // Ternopil Encyclopedic Dictionary: in 4 v. / editorial board: H. Yavorskyi and other, Ternopil: "Zbruch", 2008, V. 3: П—Я, S. 151. — ISBN 978-966-528-279-2.
