= Monastyrskaya, Vashkinsky District, Vologda Oblast =

Monastyrskaya Монастырская
- Village
- Location within Vologda Oblast Location within Russia
- Coordinates: 60°19′N 37°41′E
- Country: Russia
- Region: Vologda Oblast
- District: Vashkinsky District
- Time zone: UTC+3:00

Monastyrskaya (Russian: Монастырская) is a rural locality (a village) in Kisnemskoye Rural Settlement, Vashkinsky District, Vologda Oblast, Russia. The population was 17 as of 2002.

== Geography ==
Monastyrskaya is located 24 km northwest of Lipin Bor (the district's administrative centre) by road. Troitskoye is the nearest rural locality.
