= Monastyrskaya, Syamzhensky District, Vologda Oblast =

Monastyrskaya Монастырская
- Village
- Location within Vologda Oblast Location within Russia
- Coordinates: 60°07′N 41°38′E
- Country: Russia
- Region: Vologda Oblast
- District: Syamzhensky District
- Time zone: UTC+3:00

Monastyrskaya (Russian: Монастырская) is a rural locality (a village) in Rezhskoye Rural Settlement, Syamzhensky District, Vologda Oblast, Russia. The population was 55 as of 2002. There are 4 streets.

== Geography ==
Monastyrskaya is located 45 km northeast of Syamzha (the district's administrative centre) by road. Markovo is the nearest rural locality.
