= Monastyr, Dobryansky District =

Monastyr Монастырь
- Village
- Location within Perm Krai Location within Russia
- Coordinates: 58°43′N 56°53′E
- Country: Russia
- Region: Perm Krai
- District: Dobryansky District
- Time zone: UTC+5:00

Monastyr (Russian: Монастырь) is a rural locality (a village) in Dobryansky District, Perm Krai, Russia. The population was 9 as of 2010.

== Geography ==
Monastyr is located 55 km northeast of Dobryanka (the district's administrative centre) by road. Berdnikovshchina is the nearest rural locality.
