= Monastyr, Gaynsky District =

Monastyr Монастырь
- Village
- Location within Perm Krai Location within Russia
- Coordinates: 60°13′N 53°51′E
- Country: Russia
- Region: Perm Krai
- District: Gaynsky District
- Time zone: UTC+5:00

Monastyr (Russian: Монастырь) is a rural locality (a village) in Seyvinskoye Rural Settlement, Gaynsky District, Perm Krai, Russia. The population was 3 as of 2010.

== Geography ==
Monastyr is located 38 km southwest of Gayny (the district's administrative centre) by road. Pugvin Mys is the nearest rural locality.
