= Strypa =

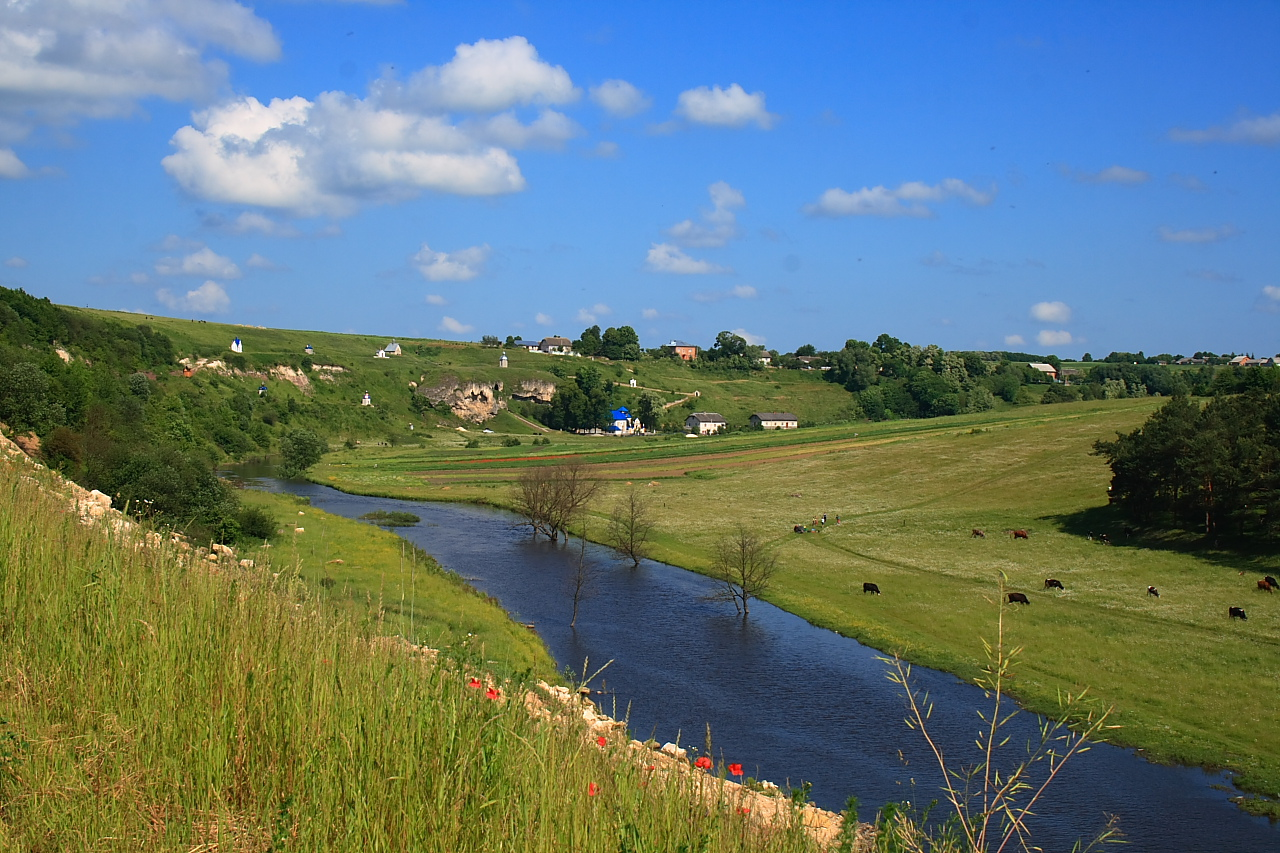

Location
- Country: Ukraine

Physical characteristics
- Mouth: Dniester
  - coordinates: 48°52′04″N 25°25′32″E
- Length: 147 km (91 mi)
- Basin size: 1,610 km^{2} (620 sq mi)

Basin features
- Progression: Dniester→ Dniester Estuary→ Black Sea

The Strypa (Ukrainian: Стрипа; Hungarian: Sztripa) is a river in Ternopil Oblast, Western Ukraine. It is a left-bank tributary of the Dniester that flows southward for 147 km through Ternopil oblast and drains a basin area of 1,610 km^{2} (620 sq mi) (12% territory of Ternopil Oblast). The river is generally approximately 30 m wide and has a sharply defined valley. Its waters are used for industry and agriculture. A small water reservoir has been built on it. The major centers located along the river include Zboriv, Buchach, and Zarvanytsia.

Its main tributaries are Western Strypa, Vosushka, Vil'khovets', and Studenka.

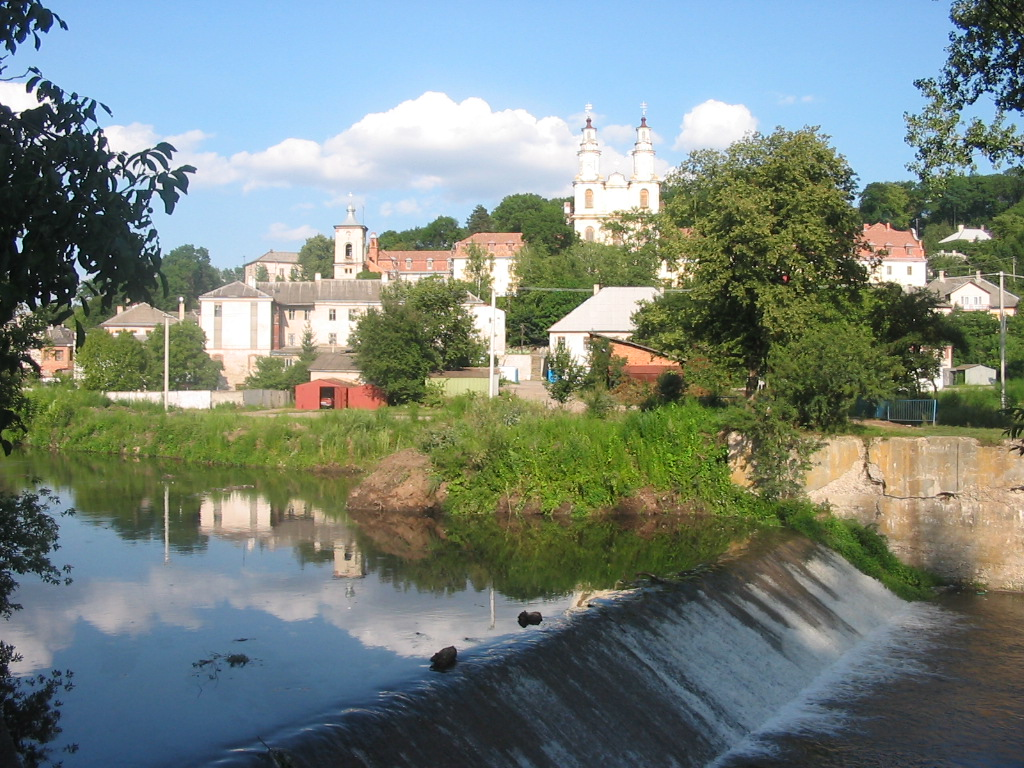

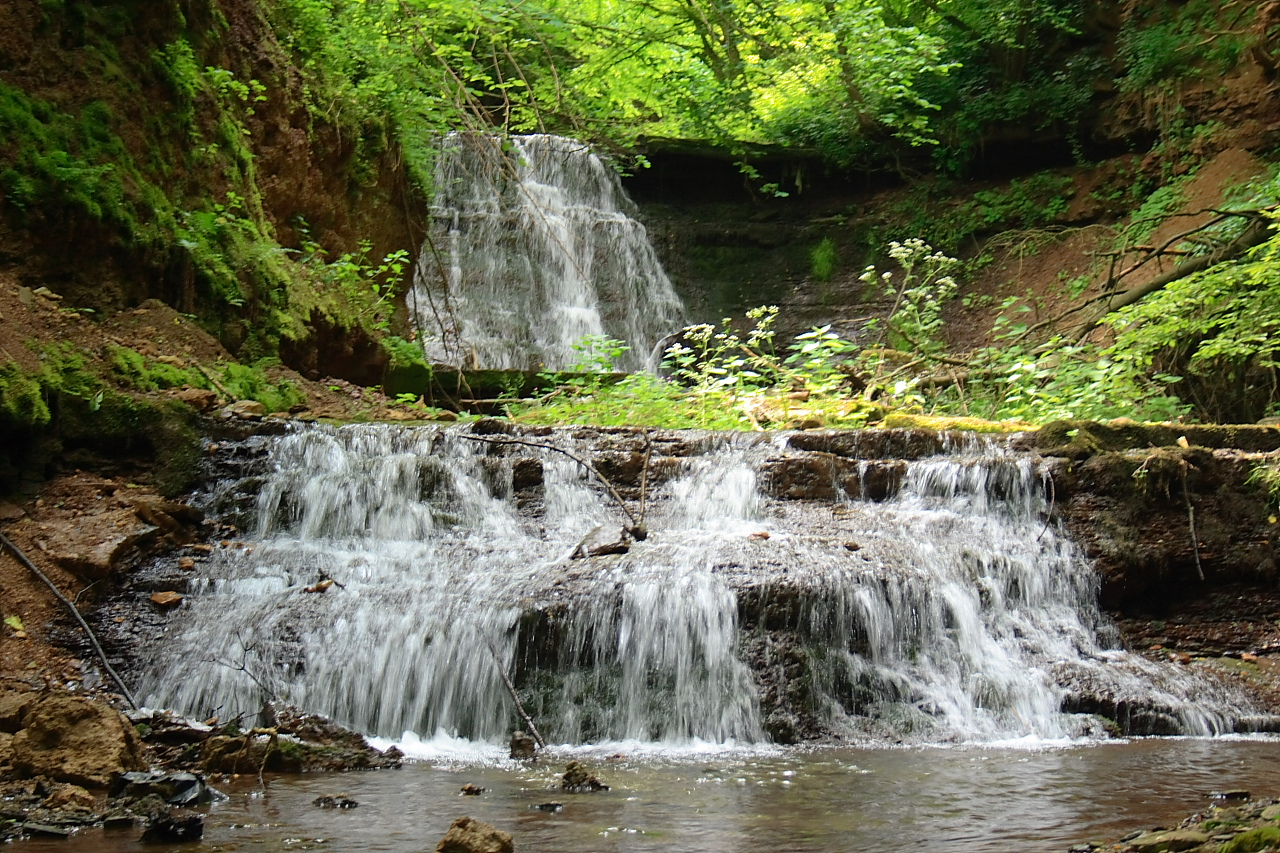
Rusyliv Falls

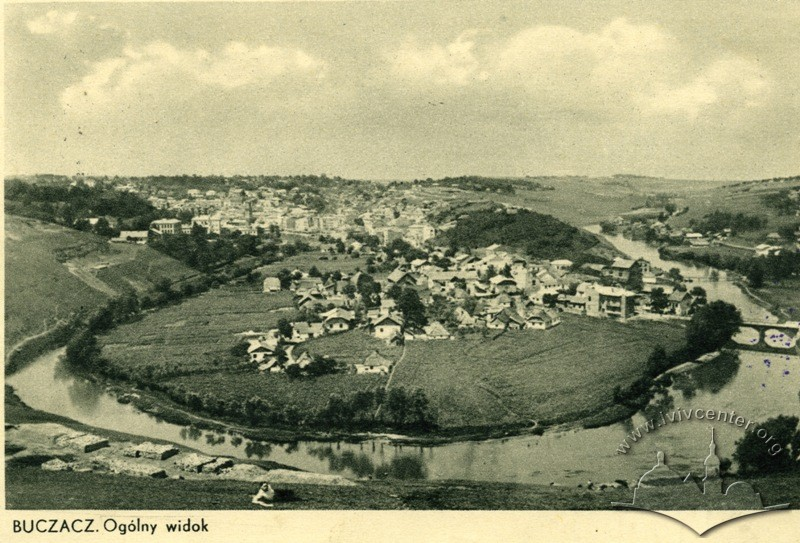
Meandre in Buchach

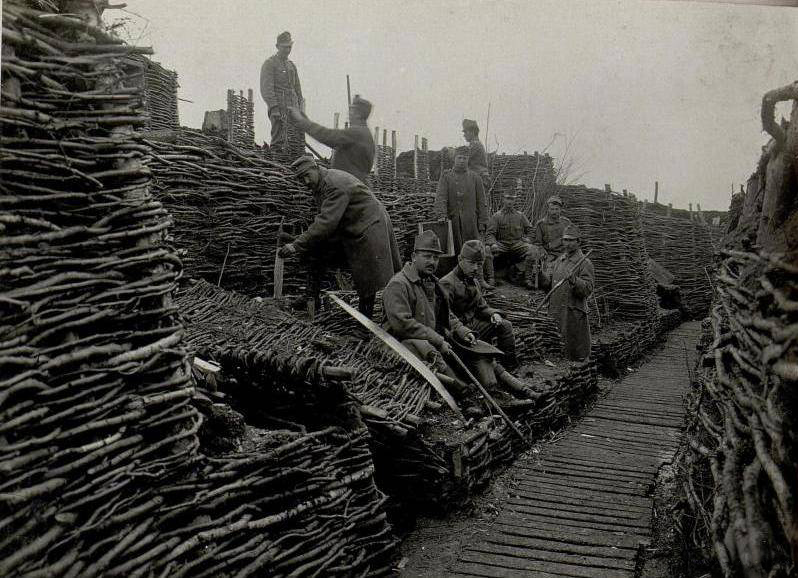

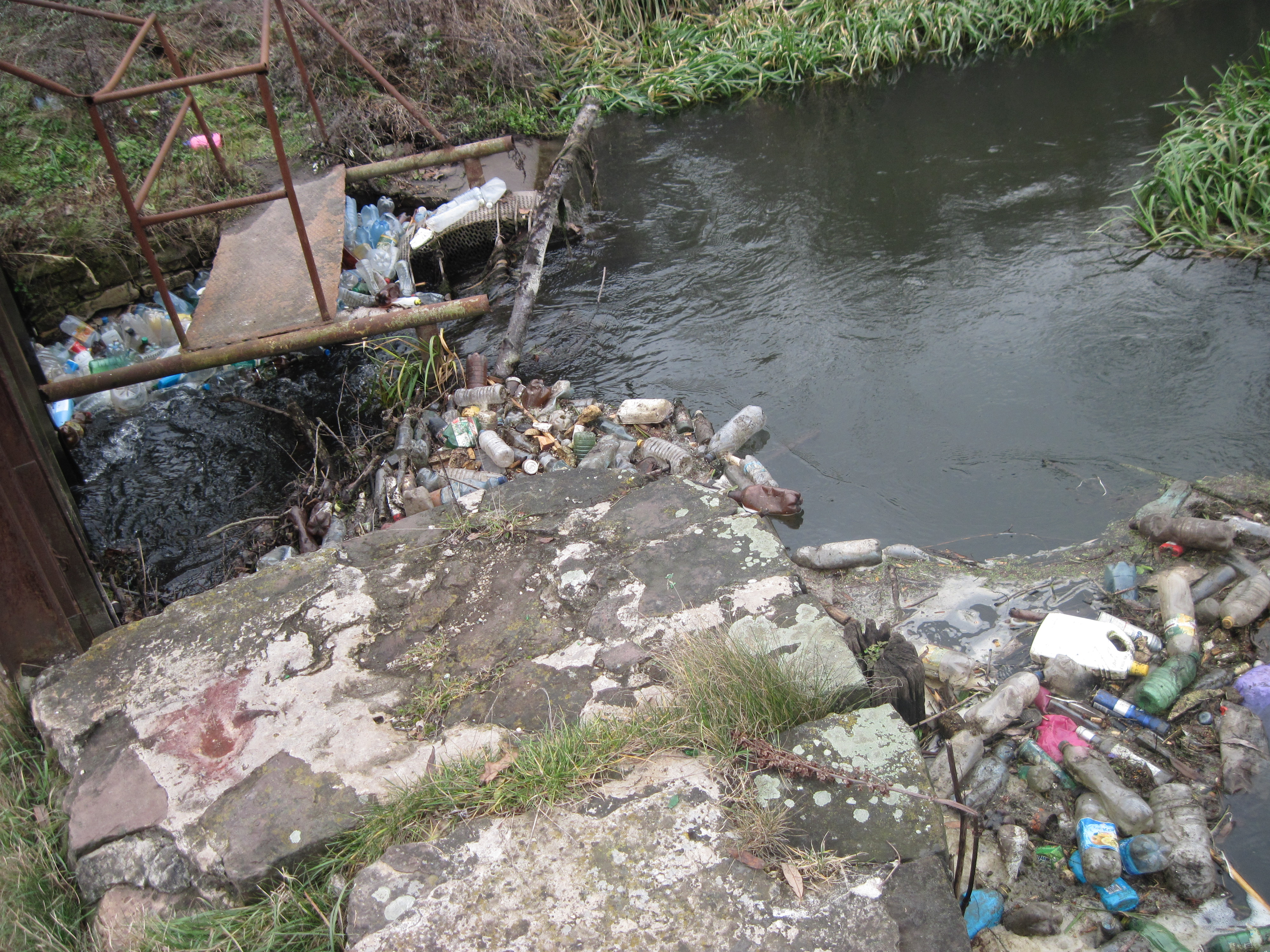

== Sources ==
- (in Ukrainian) В. Паращій, Й. Свинко, Стрипа // Ternopil Encyclopedic Dictionary: in 4 v. / editorial board: H. Yavorskyi and other, Ternopil: "Zbruch", 2008, V. 3: П—Я, S. 362. — ISBN 978-966-528-279-2.
