= Trybukhivtsi rural hromada =

Hromada in Ternopil Oblast, Ukraine

Trybukhivtsi rural hromada Трибухівська сільська громада
- hromada
- Location within Ternopil Oblast Location within Ukraine
- Coordinates: 49°2′28″N 25°27′36″E
- Country: Ukraine
- Oblast: Ternopil Oblast
- Raion: Chortkiv Raion
- Administrative center: Trybukhivtsi

Government
  - Hromada head: Oleh Kovdryn

Area
  - Total: 116.2 km^{2} (44.9 sq mi)

Population (2022)
  - Total: 8,627
- Villages: 7
- Website: trybuhivska-gromada.gov.ua

Trybukhivtsi rural hromada (Ukrainian: Трибухівська сільська територіальна громада, romanized: Trybukhivska silska terytorialna hromada is a hromada in Ukraine, in Chortkiv Raion of Ternopil Oblast. The administrative center is the village of Trybukhivtsi. Its population is 8,627 (2022 estimate)

== History ==
It was formed on 20 September 2016 by amalgamation of Pyshkivtsi and Trybukhivtsi rural councils of Buchach Raion.

On 5 June 2019, Tsvitova rural council of Buchach Raion joined the community.

== Settlements ==
The hromada consists of 7 villages:

- Martynivka
- Medvedivtsi
- Novostavtsi
- Pyliava
- Pyshkivtsi
- Trybukhivtsi
- Tsvitova
