= Monastyrsky (surname) =

Monastyrsky is a Russian and Ukrainian surname. Feminine forms: Russian: Monastyrskaya, Ukrainian: Monastyrska. It is a Russian clerical surname derived from the word monastyr, 'monastery'. Notable people with the surname include:

- Andrei Monastyrski (born 1949), a Russian artist and author
- Bentsion Monastyrsky (1903–1977), a Soviet cameraman
- Denys Monastyrsky (1980–2023), a Ukrainian politician
- Liudmyla Monastyrska, Ukrainian soprano
- Mikhail Monastyrsky, Soviet and Russian antiquarian and politician, primarily known as art forger
- Pyotr Monastyrsky (1915–2013), a Soviet and Russian theater director, actor, teacher, publicist
