= Monastyrsky, Medvensky District, Kursk Oblast =

Rural locality in Kursk Oblast, Russia

Monastyrsky Монастырский
- Khutor
- Interactive map of Monastyrsky
- Location of Monastyrsky Monastyrsky (Kursk Oblast)
- Coordinates: 51°20′42″N 36°07′19″E
- Country: Russia
- Federal subject: Kursk Oblast
- Administrative district: Medvensky District
- SelsovietSelsoviet: Nizhnereutchansky

Population (2010 Census)
  - Total: 5
  - Estimate (2010): 5 (0%)

Municipal status
  - Municipal district: Medvensky Municipal District
  - Rural settlement: Nizhnereutchansky Selsoviet Rural Settlement
- Time zone: UTC+3 (MSK)
- Postal code: 307030
- Dialing code: +7 47146
- OKTMO ID: 38624436151
- Website: nizhnezeut.rkursk.ru

Monastyrsky (Russian: Монастырский) is a rural locality (a khutor) in Nizhnereutchansky Selsoviet Rural Settlement, Medvensky District, Kursk Oblast, Russia. Population: 5 (2010 census); 14 (2002 census);

== Geography ==
The khutor is located on the Reut River (a left tributary of the Seym), 60 km from the Russia–Ukraine border, 41 km south of Kursk, 7 km south of the district center – the urban-type settlement Medvenka, 6 km from the selsoviet center – Nizhny Reutets.

Climate

Monastyrsky has a warm-summer humid continental climate (Dfb in the Köppen climate classification).

== Transport ==
Monastyrsky is located 2 km from the federal route M-2 Crimea Highway (a part of the European route E105), 34 km from the nearest railway halt 457 km (railway line Lgov I — Kursk).

The rural locality is situated 47 km from Kursk Vostochny Airport, 84 km from Belgorod International Airport and 221 km from Voronezh Peter the Great Airport.
