= Chortkiv Raion =

Subdivision of Ternopil Oblast, Ukraine

Chortkiv Raion Чортківський район
- Raion
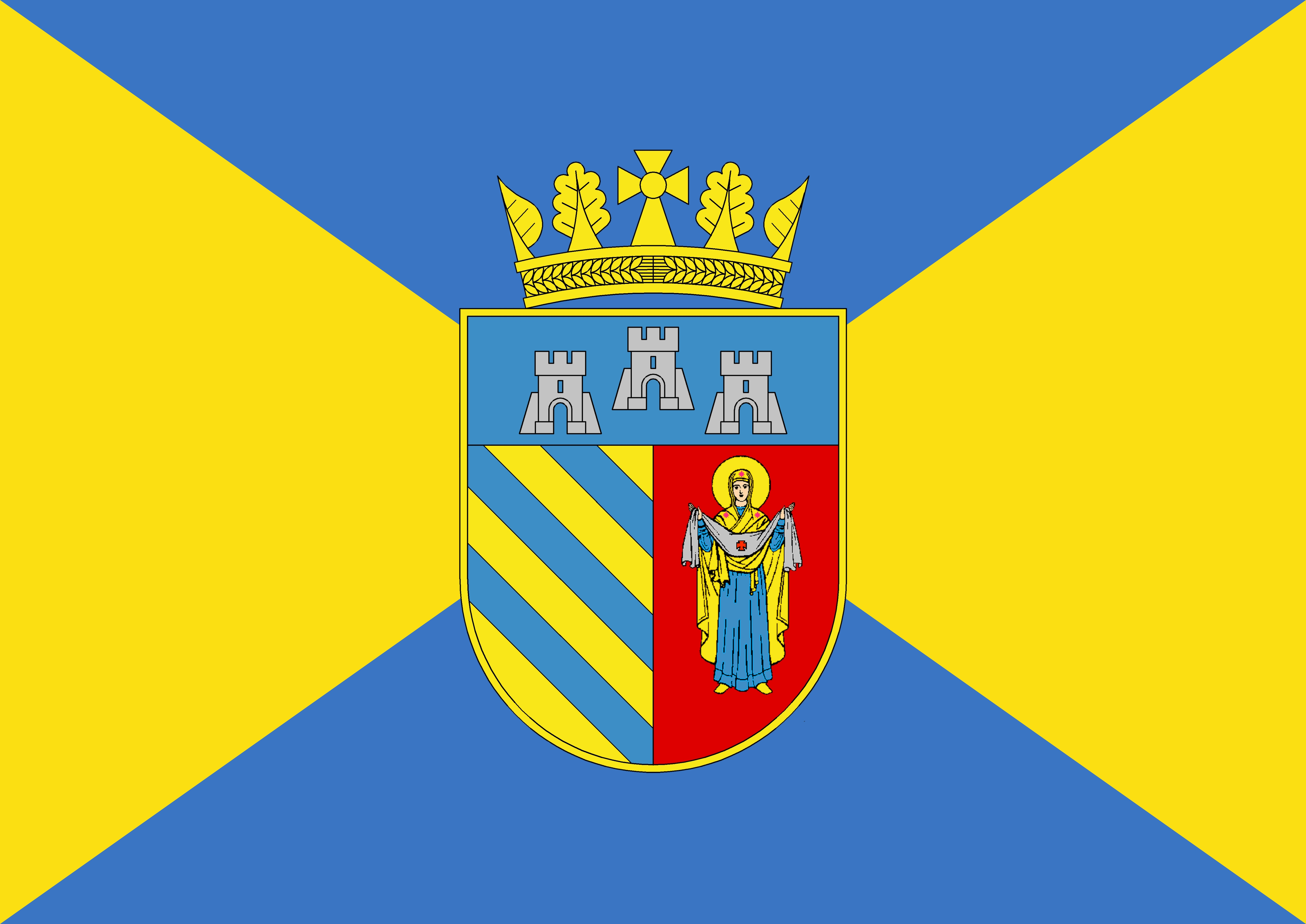
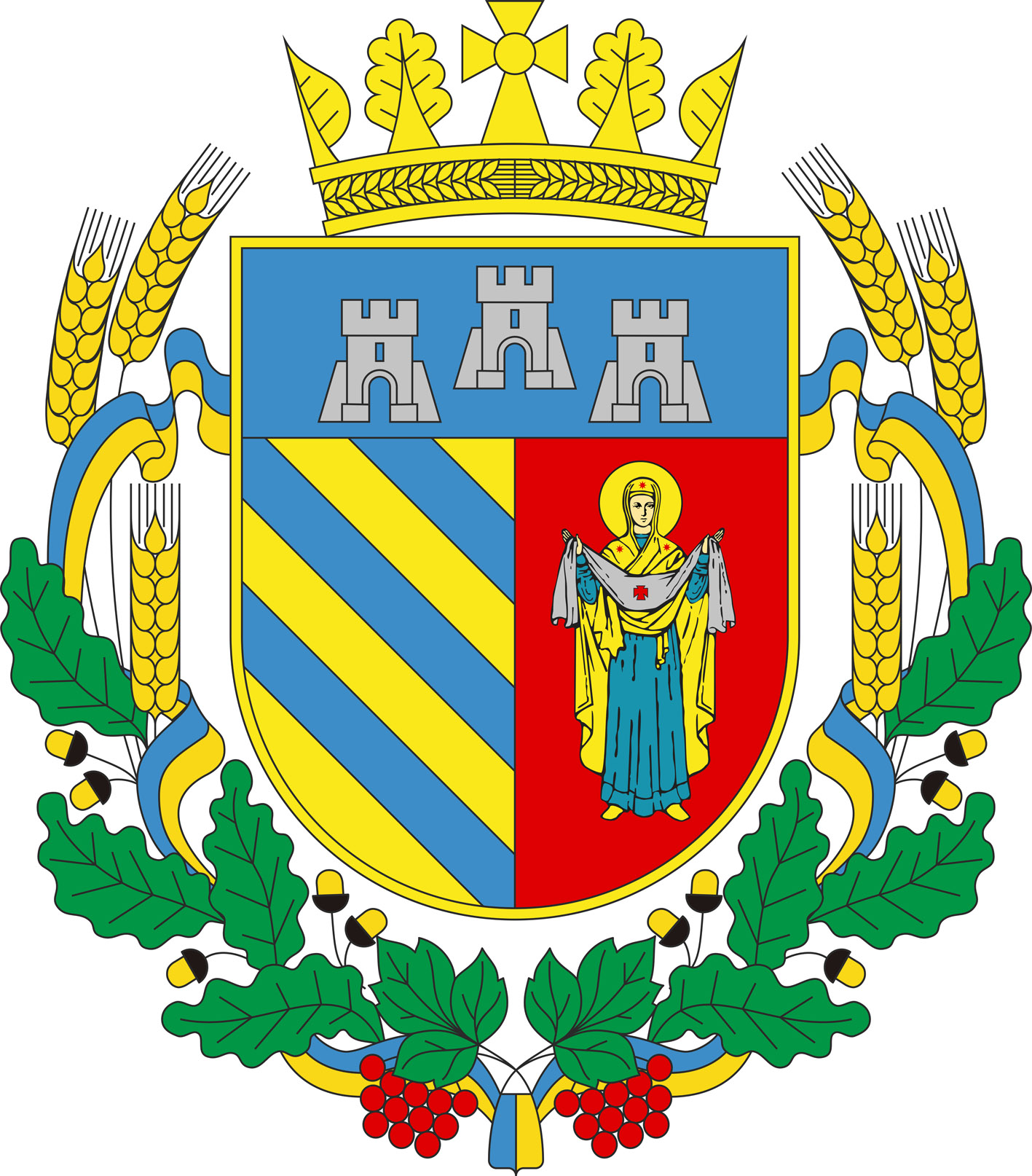
- Flag Coat of arms

- Interactive map of Chortkiv Raion
- Coordinates: 48°58′N 25°49′E
- Country: Ukraine
- Oblast: Ternopil Oblast
- Established: 1939
- Admin. center: Chortkiv
- Subdivisions: 22 hromadas

Area
  - Total: 5,028 km^{2} (1,941 sq mi)

Population (2022)
  - Total: 322,293
  - Density: 64.10/km^{2} (166.0/sq mi)
- Time zone: UTC+02:00 (EET)
  - Summer (DST): UTC+03:00 (EEST)
- Area code: 380-3552

Chortkiv Raion (Ukrainian: Чортківський район) is a raion in Ternopil Oblast in western Ukraine. Its administrative center is the city of Chortkiv. It has a population of 322,293 (2022 estimate).

== History ==
In the Second Polish Republic, the area belonged to the County of Kopczynce, Tarnopol Voivodeship. Following the First Partition of Poland in 1772, it became part of the Habsburg monarchy's Kingdom of Galicia and Lodomeria. Following the Peace of Schönbrunn in 1809, the area was ceded to the Russian Empire but was returned to the Habsburg monarchy as a result of the Congress of Vienna in 1815.

After the dissolution of Austria-Hungary in 1918, the area became part of the Second Polish Republic. After the Soviet invasion of Poland in 1939, it was incorporated into the Ukrainian SSR. Following the invasion of the Soviet Union by Nazi Germany in summer 1941, the area was administrated as part of the General Government. When the Soviet Union retook the area in 1944, the region returned to the Ukrainian SSR. Since the dissolution of the Ukrainian SSR and the Soviet Union in 1991, the area has been part of independent Ukraine.

On 18 July 2020, as part of the administrative reform of Ukraine, the number of raions of Ternopil Oblast was reduced to three, and the area of Chortkiv Raion was significantly expanded. Five abolished raions, Borshchiv, Buchach, Husiatyn, Monastyryska, and Zalishchyky Raions, as well as the city of Chortkiv, which was previously incorporated as a city of oblast significance and did not belong to the raion, were merged into Chortkiv Raion. The January 2020 estimate of the raion population was 42,832 (2020 est.)

== Subdivisions ==
=== Current ===
After the reform in July 2020, the raion consisted of 22 hromadas:

- Bilche-Zolote rural hromada with the administration in the selo of Bilche-Zolote, transferred from Borshchiv Raion;
- Bilobozhnytsia rural hromada with the administration in the selo of Bilobozhnytsia, retained from Chortkiv Raion;
- Borshchiv urban hromada with the administration in the city of Borshchiv, transferred from Borshchiv Raion;
- Buchach urban hromada with the administration in the city of Buchach, transferred from Buchach Raion;
- Chortkiv urban hromada with the administration in the city of Chortkiv, retained from Chortkiv Raion and transferred from the city of oblast significance of Chortkiv;
- Hrymailiv settlement hromada with the administration in the rural settlement of Hrymailiv, transferred from Husiatyn Raion;
- Husiatyn settlement hromada with the administration in the rural settlement of Husiatyn, transferred from Husiatyn Raion;
- Ivane-Puste rural hromada with the administration in the selo of Ivane-Puste, transferred from Borshchiv Raion;
- Khorostkiv urban hromada with the administration in the city of Khorostkiv, transferred from Husiatyn Raion;
- Kolyndiany rural hromada with the administration in the selo of Kolyndiany, retained from Chortkiv Raion;
- Kopychyntsi urban hromada with the administration in the city of Kopychyntsi, transferred from Husiatyn Raion;
- Koropets settlement hromada with the administration in the rural settlement of Koropets, transferred from Monastyryska Raion;
- Melnytsia-Podilska settlement hromada with the administration in the rural settlement of Melnytsia-Podilska, transferred from Borshchiv Raion;
- Monastyryska urban hromada with the administration in the rural settlement of Monastyryska, transferred from Monastyryska Raion;
- Nahirianka rural hromada with the administration in the selo of Nahirianka, retained from Chortkiv Raion;
- Skala-Podilska settlement hromada with the administration in the rural settlement of Skala-Podilska, transferred from Borshchiv Raion;
- Tovste settlement hromada with the administration in the rural settlement of Tovste, transferred from Zalishchyky Raion;
- Trybukhivtsi rural hromada with the administration in the selo of Trybukhivtsi, transferred from Buchach Raion;
- Vasylkivtsi rural hromada with the administration in the selo of Vasylkivtsi, transferred from Husiatyn Raion;
- Zalishchyky urban hromada with the administration in the city of Zalishchyky, transferred from Zalishchyky Raion;
- Zavodske settlement hromada with the administration in the rural settlement of Zavodske, retained from Chortkiv Raion;
- Zolotyi Potik settlement hromada with the administration in the rural settlement of Zolotyi Potik, transferred from Buchach Raion.

=== Before 2020 ===
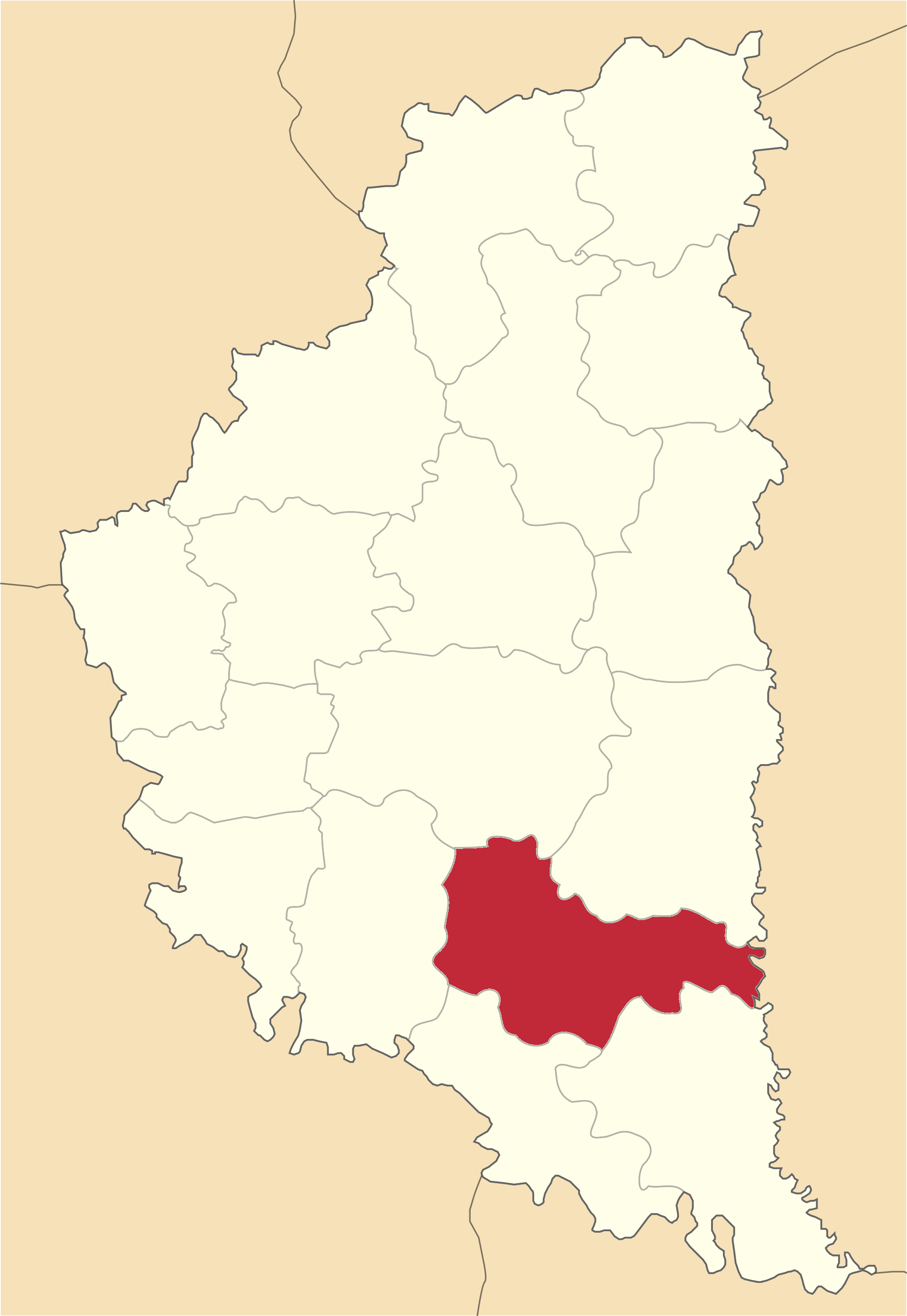
Chortkiv Raion in Ternopil Oblast (1966-2020)

Before the 2020 reform, the raion consisted of five hromadas:

- Bilobozhnytsia rural hromada with the administration in Bilobozhnytsia;
- Chortkiv urban hromada with the administration in Chortkiv, also included the city of Chortkiv;
- Kolyndiany rural hromada with the administration in Kolyndiany;
- Nahirianka rural hromada with the administration in Nahirianka;
- Zavodske settlement hromada with the administration in Zavodske.

== See also ==
- Subdivisions of Ukraine
