= Kashketnyky =

Conservative Protestant community in western Ukraine

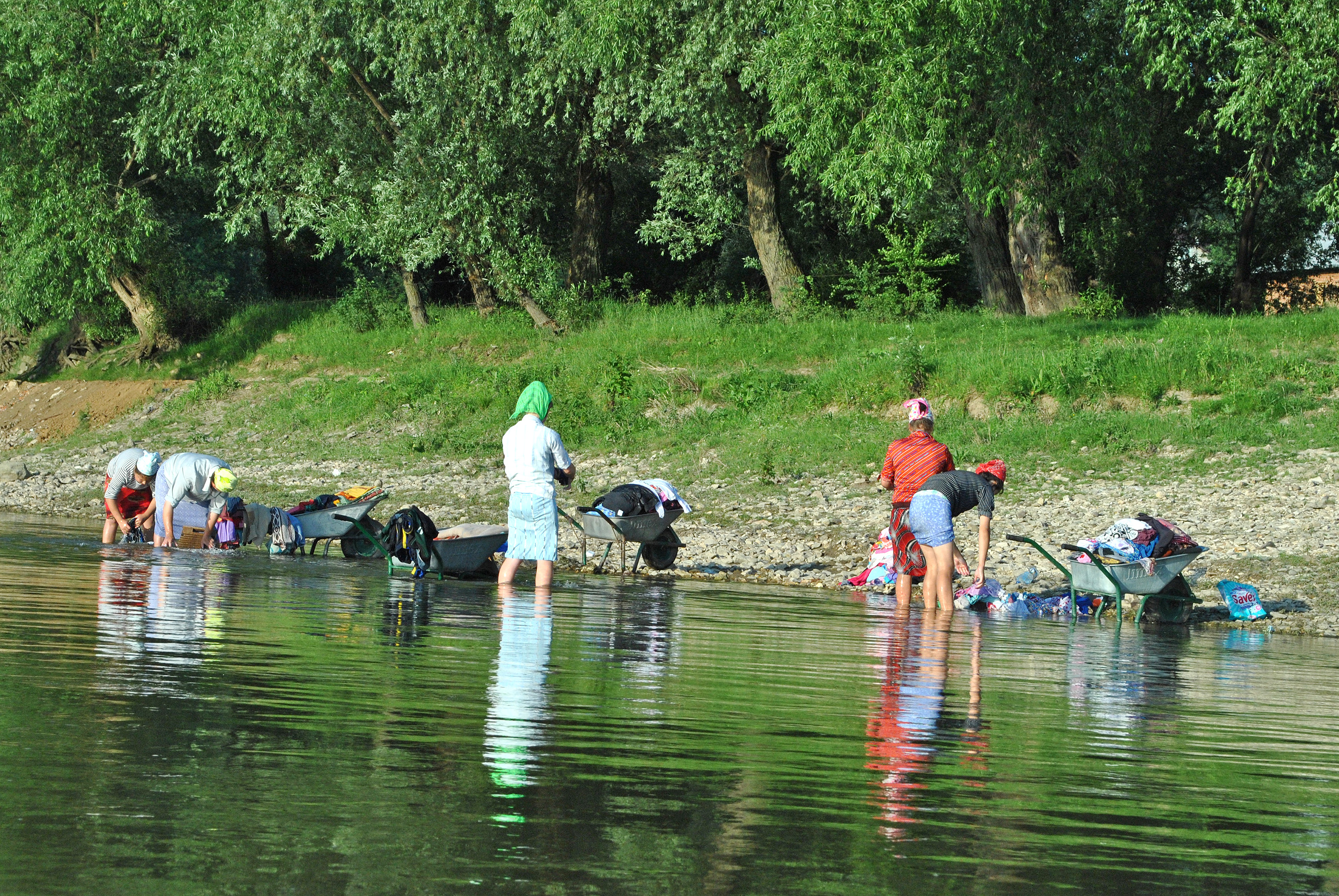
- Women of the community washing clothes in the Dniester near Budzyn (2014)

Total population
- c. 2,000 ▲ (2017)

Founder
- Ivan Derkach

Regions with significant populations
- Rural communities along the Dniester in western Ukraine, particularly in Ternopil Oblast and Ivano-Frankivsk Oblast

Religions
- Protestant Christianity (Pentecostal origin)

Scriptures
- Bible

Languages
- Ukrainian

Kashketnyky (Ukrainian: Кашкетники; literally "cap wearers"), sometimes referred to as simple believers (Ukrainian: віруючі простаки, romanized: viruiuchi prostaky), are a conservative Pentecostal Christian community found in a number of villages along the Dniester in western Ukraine. Local residents coined the name because male members wear distinctive caps (kashkety) as a sign of modesty, though members refer to themselves simply as "believers". Members aim to live in accordance with biblical teachings while remaining apart from what they regard as the corrupting influences of modern, technologically driven society, and most reject electricity, motor vehicles and mass media in their homes.

Media reports have sometimes described them as "Ukrainian Amish", although researchers and journalists have noted that the comparison is superficial and that there is no historical or organisational connection between the two groups. The community was the subject of the 2025 Ukrainian feature documentary Silent Flood, directed by Dmytro Sukholytkyy-Sobchuk, which received wider international attention through coverage by The New York Times and other outlets in early 2026.

== Names ==
The exonym kashketnyky is derived from the Ukrainian word kashket ("flat cap"), referring to the dark caps that male adherents wear from boyhood as a sign of modesty before God. Members of the group themselves reject the label and use the term viruiuchi ("believers") or viruiuchi prostaky ("simple believers"), distinguishing themselves from neighbouring Greek Catholics and from registered Pentecostal congregations. Other vernacular labels reported in local press include prostaky ("simple ones"), temni ("dark ones"), starovirtsi ("Old Believers"—a misnomer not connected to the Old Believers of Eastern Orthodoxy), as well as informal nicknames such as khustynnyky ("kerchief wearers") and, in jest, flomastery ("felt-tip pens") and olivtsi ("pencils") in reference to the bright, contrasting clothing favoured by women. Internally, observers and local officials distinguish between the stricter temni ("dark") faction—who reject electricity, gas and most modern technology in their households—and the svitli ("light") faction, which has accepted greater accommodation with surrounding society.

== History ==
Pentecostalism reached western Ukraine through emigrants returning from the United States in the early 20th century; the first organised Pentecostal congregation in Volhynia was formed in 1920, and a regional union of Pentecostals was created at a 1924 conference in Kremenets. According to historians of religion Roman Skakun and Volodymyr Moroz, evangelical preaching reached the right- and left-bank villages of the upper Dniester in the years following the First World War, when a returning prisoner of war surnamed Franko, who had encountered Pentecostalism while held in Russia, began evangelising in the area around Zolotyi Potik. By the late 1920s, small groups of converts in villages such as Kosmyryn had formed gatherings distinct from the surrounding Greek Catholic population.

During the Soviet period, Pentecostals across Ukraine faced state repression, with many leaders sentenced to long prison terms or sent to psychiatric institutions, particularly for refusing military service. Some of the believers in the Dniester villages were imprisoned during this period for the same reason.

The community consolidated into a distinct current in the 1970s under the influence of Ivan Derkach (1927–2008), a native of Kosmyryn whom adherents continue to regard as a prophet. Derkach had been seized as a young man during the Second World War for forced labour in Germany but escaped, and was later mobilised by Soviet authorities to work in the Donbas; on his return he married a woman from the local "believers" and turned increasingly to scriptural study and preaching. By 1975, Derkach and his closest followers—reportedly twelve families at first—had begun holding prayer meetings separate from other local Pentecostals, framing their separation in terms of "living in simplicity" and a withdrawal from "the world", including from electrification, radio and television.

After Derkach's death in 2008 (some sources give 2009), his grandson succeeded him as elder, although members emphasise that all believers are formally equal before God. A reporter for The New York Times identified Vasyl Rashydov, born around 1965, as one of the community's informal leaders in 2026.

== Demographics and settlement ==
Kashketnyk population in Ukraine
Year	Pop.	±% p.a.
2017	2,000	—

Estimates of the size of the community vary considerably, partly because it is unregistered with the state and partly because of disagreement over whether to count both the stricter and more accommodated wings. Researchers Skakun and Moroz estimated the population at roughly 2,000 in 2017, a figure repeated by The New York Times in 2026; some Ukrainian commentators have suggested the broader community of Pentecostal-origin households along this stretch of the Dniester may be substantially larger.

Kashketnyky communities have been reported in seven Dniester-side villages, including Kosmyryn, where they make up more than 70 percent of the population, Stinka and Snovydiv in Ternopil Oblast, as well as Mostyshche, Budzyn and Deleva in Ivano-Frankivsk Oblast. Smaller numbers of households have also been reported in adjacent settlements such as Vozyliv and Sokoliv. Birth rates in these settlements are unusually high by Ukrainian standards: Stinka has been described as having the highest birth rate in Ternopil Oblast, with about 100 children born annually in a village of roughly 2,300 residents.

The demographic weight of the community has placed considerable strain on local infrastructure. As of 2026, the school in Kosmyryn—built for around 180 pupils—was reported to have more than 420 enrolled, and Ulyana Demyanchuk, acting head of the surrounding Zolotyi Potik hromada, told The New York Times that estimated renovation costs significantly exceeded the entire annual municipal budget. A new two-storey kindergarten was completed in Stinka in 2020 to relieve overcrowding in the village school, which had been operating in multiple shifts.

== Beliefs and practices ==
Kashketnyky teachings are based on the Bible, emphasising literal obedience to scripture, "living in simplicity" and separation from "the world". Members have been reported to interpret the Second Commandment as forbidding the creation of any human or divine images; their homes generally contain no icons, photographs or other pictorial representations, and adherents typically refuse to be photographed.

=== Worship and ritual ===
The community has no church buildings; gatherings for prayer, preaching, scripture reading and psalmody are held in private homes or in unmarked prayer houses (молитовні доми) which from the outside resemble ordinary dwellings. Services are typically held on Sundays and "whenever there's a need". Kashketnyky practise believer's baptism, usually administered around the ages of fifteen or sixteen. A "breaking of bread" communion, modelled on 11:23–25, is performed only rarely—reportedly about once a year.

=== Lifestyle and dress ===
Kashketnyk households generally avoid connection to the electricity and gas networks, and members do not own automobiles, using horses and wagons for local transport. Television, radio and internet use are likewise restricted in the home. Practical compromises have nevertheless been documented: men routinely use electric power tools on construction sites, basic mobile telephones (typically flip phones used "for words" only) are widely owned, and many households have adopted lamps powered by small solar panels in place of kerosene lighting.

Women wear long skirts and cover their hair with headscarves; married women generally tie the scarf at the back over a coiled bun, while unmarried women may also tie it in front, leaving one corner loose. Men and boys wear dark flat caps from childhood and avoid garments with short sleeves or short trousers; the practice is justified as a form of bodily modesty grounded in scripture. Although the cuts of clothing are simple, members—especially women—often wear brightly coloured fabrics, a feature distinguishing them visually from the plain dress of North American Anabaptist groups. Cosmetics are avoided. Bathing and laundry are sometimes done outdoors in the Dniester; photographs of community members washing clothes and bathing fully clothed in the river drew renewed media attention in 2024.

=== Education ===
Children of the community attend the local public schools, generally completing only the compulsory nine grades; the remaining secondary years, where attended at all, are typically completed in absentia, and there is no tradition of pursuing higher education. Concerts, ceremonial assemblies and other extracurricular activities are avoided as worldly, although since the late 2010s some kashketnyk parents have permitted their children to attend summer Christian camps run in Buchach Raion by an Evangelical Christian Baptist mission. Education for boys typically ends when they begin to accompany their fathers in seasonal building work.

=== Work and economy ===
Adult men in the community work primarily in the construction industry, particularly as stonemasons, a craft well suited to the local sandstone of the Dniester valley. Builders typically take seasonal contracts in the cities of Lviv, Ternopil, Ivano-Frankivsk and Kyiv, or at the Bukovel ski resort, returning home for major holidays and family events. Earnings are reportedly distributed within families and a tithe is contributed to a common community fund. Married women generally do not work outside the home, devoting themselves to the household and to the rearing of children. Households are largely self-sufficient, growing fruit and vegetables, keeping poultry and livestock, and in some cases maintaining substantial apiaries.

=== Marriage and family ===
The group considers early marriage pious and discourages premarital courtship; according to community accounts, a young man approaches the parents of a desired bride directly, and the wedding itself is generally limited to civil registration in the village council, without large festivities. Marriages are contracted within the group, and members reportedly view marriage to outsiders unfavourably.

The community values large families and has grown principally through natural increase rather than proselytising, a pattern attributed to Derkach's particular emphasis on the biblical injunctions to "be fruitful and multiply" (1:22) and that women would be "saved through childbearing" (2:11). Derkach himself fathered sixteen children, an example treated as exemplary; many present-day kashketnyk households have ten or more children, and families with as many as eighteen or twenty have been documented. The head of the local medical clinic in Zolotyi Potik told researchers in the 2010s that infant mortality within the community was relatively high. Pregnancy and serious illness are managed with mainstream medical care.

=== Burial customs ===
Kashketnyky bury their dead in public village cemeteries, but graves are typically left unmarked: there are no crosses or headstones, and over time the burial mounds become overgrown with grass. The principal exception is the grave of Ivan Derkach in Kosmyryn, which adherents are reported to visit regularly for prayer.

== Relations with the state and society ==
A 2017 report by NTN television noted that members of the community do not generally participate in national elections and seek to avoid military service, although they may take part in local elections such as for the village head. Some kashketnyky were imprisoned during the Soviet era for refusing conscription. Skakun and Moroz reported that some members of the community had previously refused to accept state child benefits as a matter of principle, but that this position softened in many families after Derkach's death and during the economic difficulties of the mid-2010s, when the hryvnia depreciated sharply and many adherents began applying for support.

=== Russian invasion of Ukraine ===
All seven of the principal Kashketnyk villages lie along the Dniester Canyon, a corridor that since 2022 has been used by Russian forces to launch low-altitude cruise missile and Shahed loitering munition attacks at western Ukrainian targets, evading Ukrainian air defences along the river valley. Fragments of intercepted weapons have fallen in nearby villages, and during a major attack on Lviv on 5 October 2025 a strike close to Snovydiv was reported to have shaken houses in the village, with a Shahed drone observed flying directly overhead the following morning.

The pacifist orientation of the community has continued during the full-scale Russian invasion: members do not bear arms, and Ukrainian law in any case exempts fathers of three or more minor children from mandatory military service, a provision that covers most adult kashketnyky. Filmmaker Dmytro Sukholytkyy-Sobchuk has reported that the community quietly cooperates with local councils to send humanitarian aid to the front, but that adherents distinguish between contributions to defensive equipment, which they will support, and offensive weaponry, which they will not.

== Controversies ==
In January 2018, local media reported that five residents described as Kashketnyky from the village of Stinka were detained during a raid connected to illegal sandstone extraction in the Yazlovets forestry area.

In March 2020, a television crew from Inter reported being blocked for more than an hour by residents of Mostyshche while investigating alleged environmental damage and illegal extraction in the Dniester Canyon area, and police were called to the scene. Local Ukrainian outlets covering the incident reported that members of the community had threatened the journalists, in some accounts brandishing axes, before authorities intervened.

In April 2020, during the early phase of the COVID-19 pandemic, an outbreak was reported in Buchach Raion, with the majority of confirmed cases concentrated in Kosmyryn (16 cases) and Stinka (3 cases). The presbyter of the stricter wing of the community was hospitalised in Ivano-Frankivsk, and infections were also identified among medical staff at the local clinic. Some community members initially disputed the official figures and the existence of an outbreak in the area; local authorities reported that engagement with public-health requirements improved as the number of cases rose.

== In media ==
The community is the subject of Silent Flood (Ukrainian: Тиха повінь), a 2025 Ukrainian–German feature documentary directed by Dmytro Sukholytkyy-Sobchuk and produced by Tabor Production in co-production with Elemag Pictures, Mitteldeutscher Rundfunk and Arte. The film world-premiered in the International Competition of the International Documentary Film Festival Amsterdam (IDFA) in November 2025, where it received the festival's award for Best Cinematography. Reviewing the film for Variety, Guy Lodge described the community as "an isolated, peaceable community of staunchly traditionalist Christians" living in self-imposed isolation along the Dniester, and praised the film's contemplative depiction of the tensions between the community's pacifism and the wider Russo-Ukrainian War. Screen International similarly characterised it as a "lyrical, veiled portrait" of an "Amish-like religious community", noting its meditation on the cyclical recurrence of war and flooding in the region.

A long-form feature in The New York Times published in March 2026, drawing on interviews with adherents in Kosmyryn and Snovydiv as well as with the scholar Volodymyr Moroz, brought further international attention to the community.

== See also ==
- Amish
- Hutterites
- Old Believers
- Old Order Mennonite
- Pentecostalism in Ukraine
- Plain people
- Protestantism in Ukraine
