= Zolotyi Potik =

Urban locality in Ternopil Oblast, Ukraine

Zolotyi Potik Золотий Потік
- Rural settlement
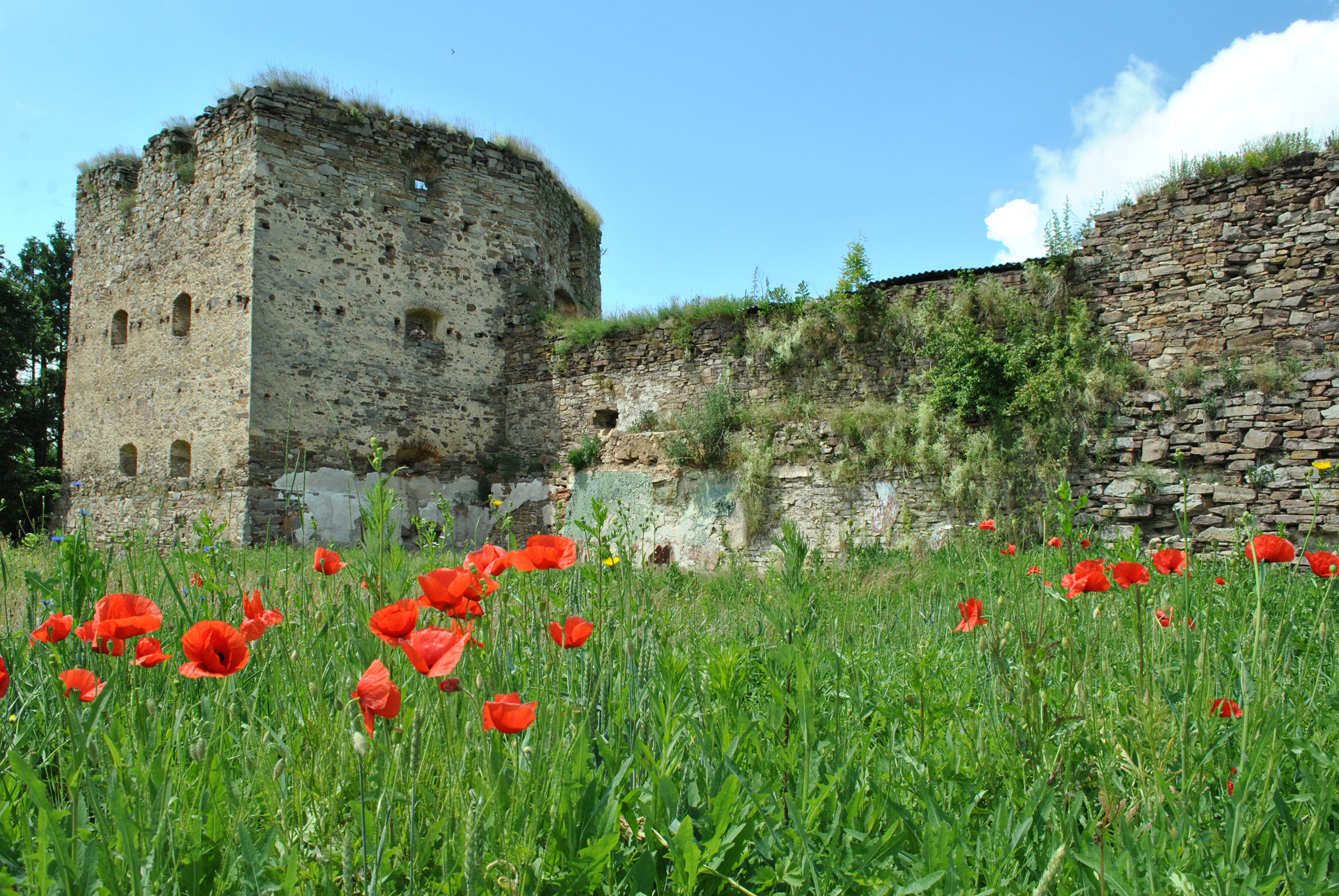
- Remains of the 16th–17th century Zolotyi Potik Castle

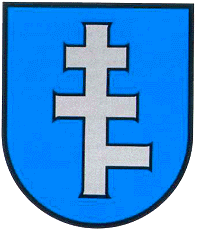
- Coat of arms

- Location of Zolotyi Potik in Ternopil Oblast Location of Zolotyi Potik in Ukraine
- Coordinates: 48°54′27″N 25°20′18″E
- Country: Ukraine
- Oblast: Ternopil Oblast
- Raion: Chortkiv Raion
- Hromada: Zolotyi Potik settlement hromada
- Founded: 1388
- Town Status: 1578, 1984

Area
  - Total: 19.70 km^{2} (7.61 sq mi)
- Elevation: 339 m (1,112 ft)

Population (2022)
  - Total: 2,360
  - Density: 120/km^{2} (310/sq mi)
- Time zone: UTC+2 (EET)
  - Summer (DST): UTC+3 (EEST)
- Postal code: 48451
- Area code: +380 3544
- Website: http://rada.gov.ua/

Zolotyi Potik (Ukrainian: Золотий Потік, romanized: Zolotyy Potik; Polish: Potok Złoty or Potok; Russian: Золотой Поток, romanized: Zolotoy Potok; Yiddish: פּאָטיק, romanized: Potik; Hebrew: פוטוק זלוטי, romanized: Potok Zloti) is a rural settlement in Chortkiv Raion, Ternopil Oblast, western Ukraine. It hosts the administration of Zolotyi Potik settlement hromada, one of the hromadas of Ukraine. Population: 2,360 (2022 estimate).

== History ==
Although Zolotyi Potik would not be formally settled until the 14th century, A.D., evidence of Cucuteni–Trypillia culture exists from tools dated to the 3rd millennium, B.C.

The settlement "Zahaipole" (Ukrainian: Загайполе, Polish: Zahajpol) was founded in 1388. Potok was first mentioned in written sources in the late 16th century, as part of the territory ceded by Sigismund I the Old to Sigismund II Augustus, and later was given to Jakub Potocki^{[uk]}, Court Marshal for Sigismund's wife, as a reward for his services to the territory. The town was renamed "Potok" (Ukrainian: Potik) in accordance with the family surname under the House of Potocki, when it was under the control of Jakub's sons: Mikołaj, Jan, and Andrzej. In 1578, it was granted Magdeburg rights and renamed "Potok Złoty" (Ukrainian: Zolotyi Potik, "Golden Brook").

When Stefan Potocki established Potok Złoty, he modified his coat of arms by changing the silver cross to gold - in this way, the Piława Potocki line evolved into two branches: silver and golden. He and his wife, Maria Mohylanka, founded a church and convent of St. Stefan in the town. Jakub Potocki and Stefan Potocki are both buried in the parish's cemetery.

In 1676, the invading Turkish-Tartar army led by Beylerbey of Damascus, Melek Ibrahim Sheitan, destroyed the local castle, which up until then had been the main estate of the residing branch of the Potocki family. Around the same time period, the town was ravaged and much of it was destroyed under the siege led by Bogdan Khmelnytskyi, which resulted in the deaths of Jews, as well as 3 Dominican monks.

In the diary of Ulrich von Werdum from 1672, during his travels to Poland, Zlotyi Potik is described as a small town with a Roman-Catholic church built of stone. The castle, built on the southern edge of town, was also described as surrounded by a stone wall and fortified with four towers. The Ukrainians in the suburbs had a church, and Jews had a synagogue in town.

On November 8, 1764, St. Nicholas of Buchach wrote that Ignacy Potocki and his brother, Vicenty, became owners of the town of Potock, or overall, the villages of: villages of Zubrets, Porkhov, Nezvysko, Zalishchyky, Sokoliv, Rusyliv, Kosmyryn, Kostilnyky, Gubin, Unizh, Snovydiv, Vozyliv, Stinka, Koropets, Pshenychne, Bushyn, Podvoka, and parts of Zhyvachany village.

The Słownik geograficzny corroborates Ignacy's ownership of the town, although it does so erroneously, as it lists his ownership after his passing. Ignacy's son Aleksander eventually took over the estate, and began to sell parts of it at the end of the 18th century. Ludwik Skwarczyński became one of the main landholders in the region, who became the de facto owner of the town.

An old palace, now named for landowner Włodzimierz Gniewosz, was constructed in the 1830s, and was owned by estateman Olszewski, until purchased by Gniewosz in 1875, who lived in the residence until the arrival of the Moscow offensive troops, and the palace was destroyed. It was partially rebuilt and restored, although lacks some features that the original possessed.

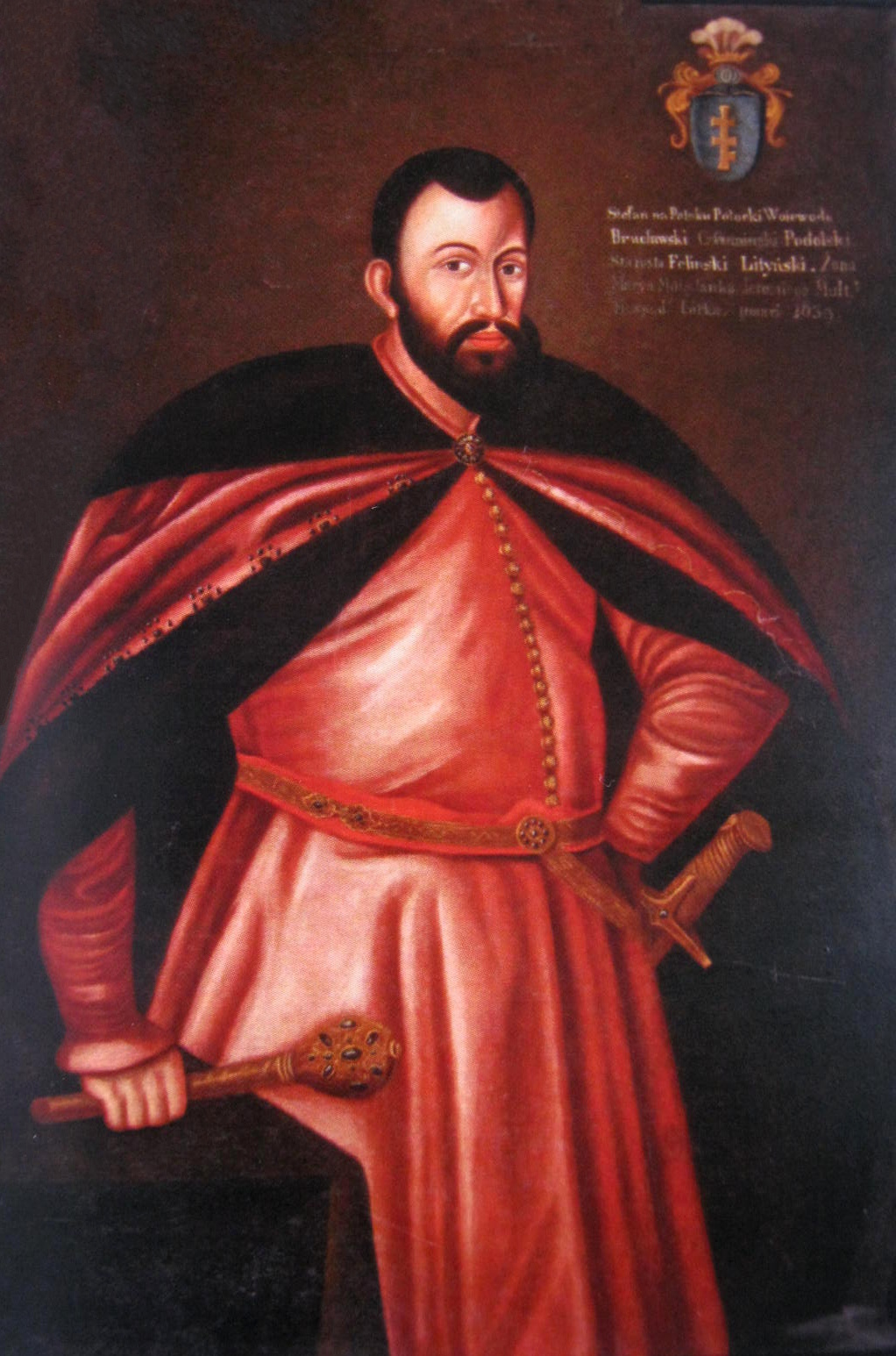
Stefan Potocki, founder of Zolotyi Potik

After the first partition of Poland in 1772, the town was controlled by the Holy Roman Empire (until 1804), the Austrian Empire (until 1867), Austria-Hungary (until 1919), Poland (until 1939), and finally the USSR (until 1991). In 1984, Zolotyi Potik was granted the status of an urban-type settlement.

Until 18 July 2020, Zolotyi Potik belonged to Buchach Raion. The raion was abolished in July 2020 as part of the administrative reform of Ukraine, which reduced the number of raions of Ternopil Oblast to three. The area of Buchach Raion was merged into Chortkiv Raion. On 26 January 2024, a new law entered into force which abolished the status of urban-type settlement, and Zolotyi Potik became a rural settlement.

== Jewish community and Holocaust ==
A Jewish community began forming in Zolotyi Potik as early as 1635, and eventually consisted of 1/3 of the town's population. It was recorded at 335 in 1765. The figure tripled to 1,247 a century later, in 1880. The population began declining after that, falling to 1,036 in 1900, and after WWI, in 1921, the population was at 895

Nazi German troops occupied the town on July 10, 1941. Its Jewish inhabitants, comprising around one-third of the town's total population, were mostly deported to Buchach by fall of 1942. Subsequently, on October 17, 1942, most Jews residing in the Buczacz Ghetto were transported to the Bełżec extermination camp or shot, although many survived as late as March 1944, when Jews attempted to hide in the woods from temporarily retreating German forces. There were little to no survivors from the town.

There is a Jewish cemetery in the town to this day, consisting of burials from the pre-war population.

== Potocki Castle ==
Potocki Castle was constructed from sandstone by Stefan at the beginning of the 17th century. It was the main residence of Potocki, and his wife, Maria Mohylaanka. It was built under order of Sigismund, and was built with high, 2-meter thick walls in order to protect merchant business within the city from invaders, and each corner contained a 3-tier embrasure. A second floor was added to the castle later on. The structure is located on the left bank of the Zolota River, a tributary of the Dniester. The castle was inhabited until the invasion of Sheitan, when the majority of the castle was destroyed. The building was preserved in some form or another, passing down through owners until a fire in 1935, and then some reconstruction efforts were made 3 years following the incident. There are still remnants of the castle visible in the village today.

== Landmarks and points of interest ==
- Ruins of the late Renaissance castle built by Stefan Potocki,
- Church of the Holy Trinity (1879)
- Chapel of Our Mother of God of Zarvanytsia
- Belfry
- Mission cross to the 100th anniversary of the Church of Holy Trinity
- Symbolic grave of Ukrainian Sich Riflemen (restored in 1991).

== Gallery ==
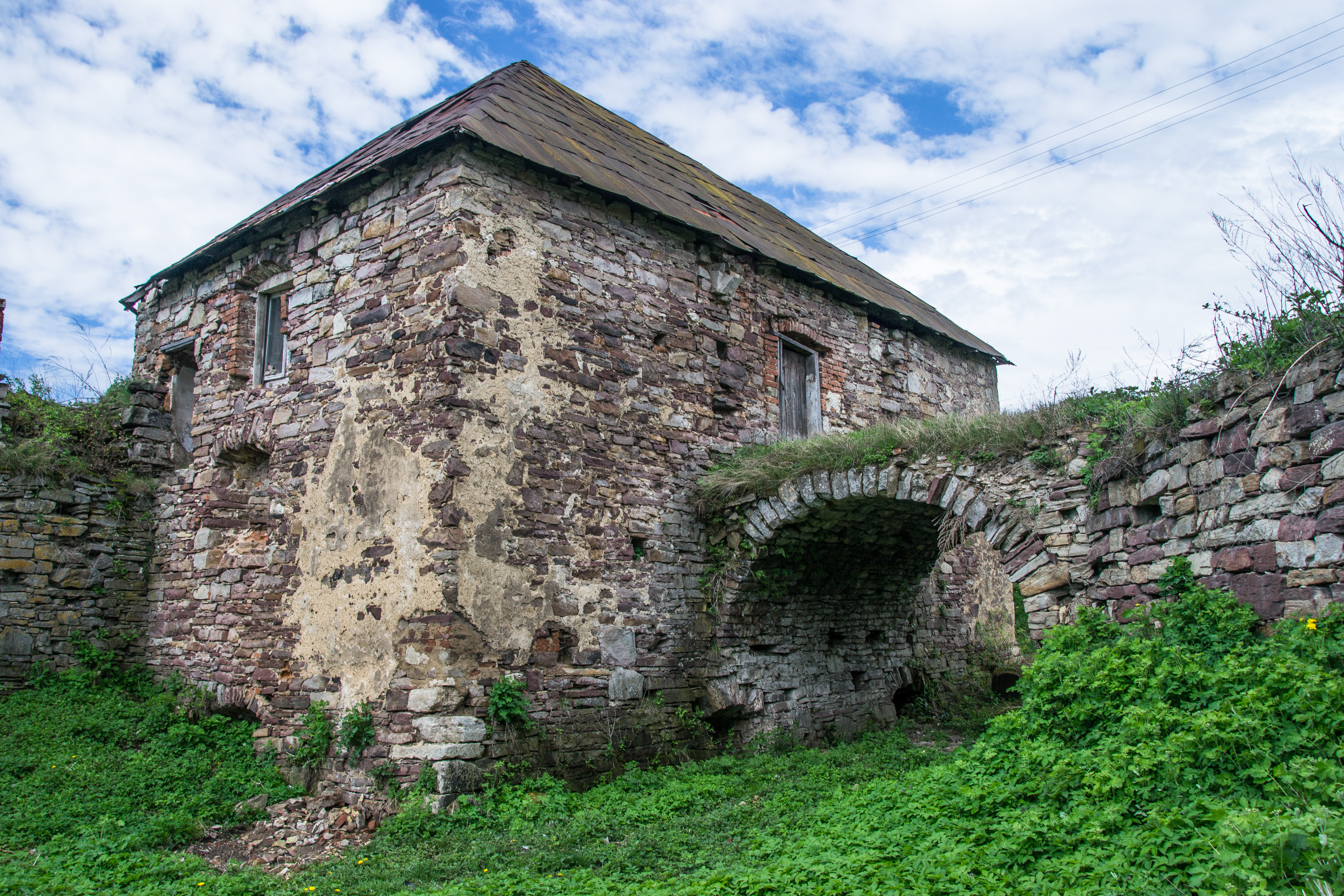
Remnants of Potocki Castle

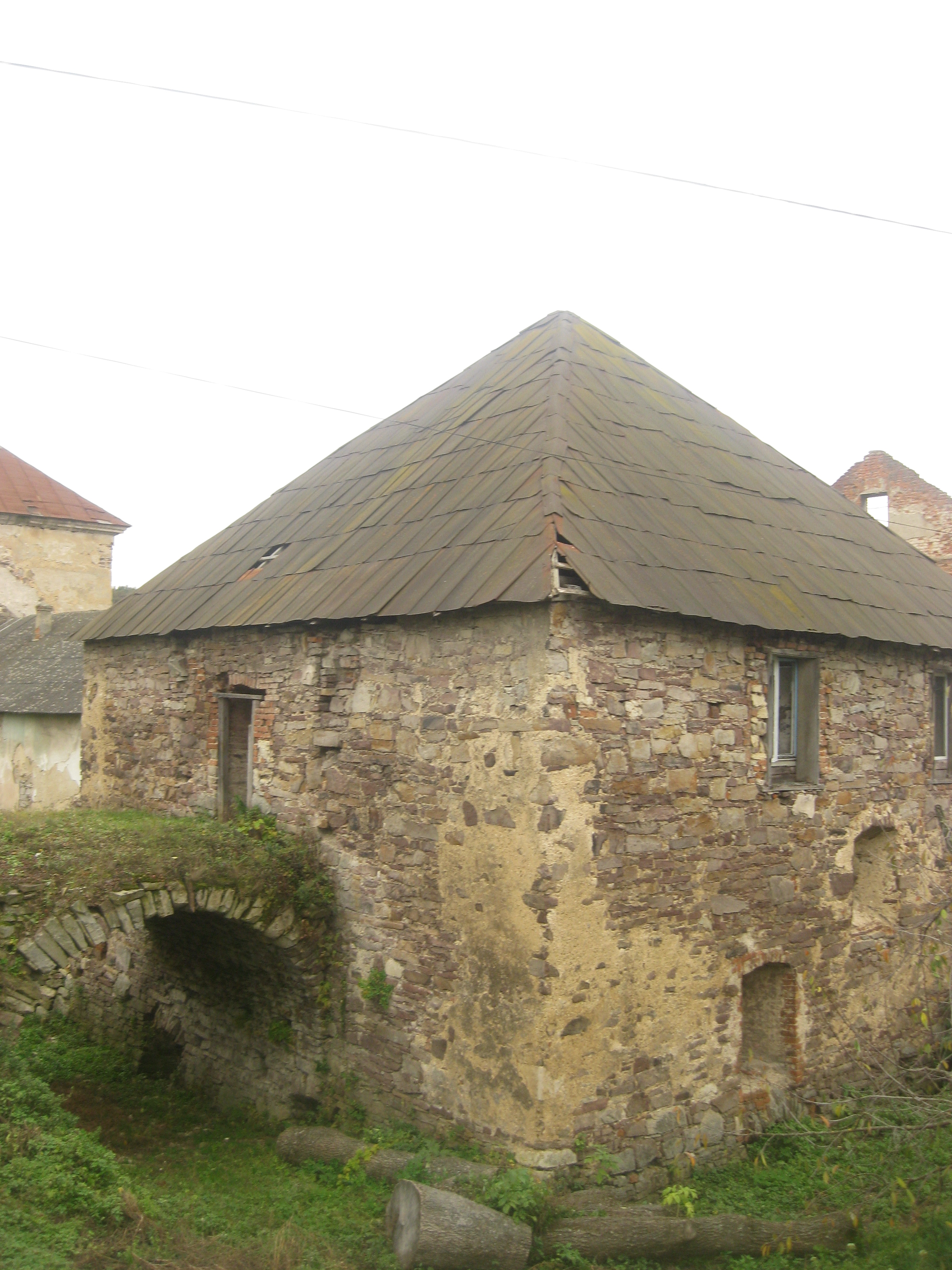
Remnants of Potocki Castle

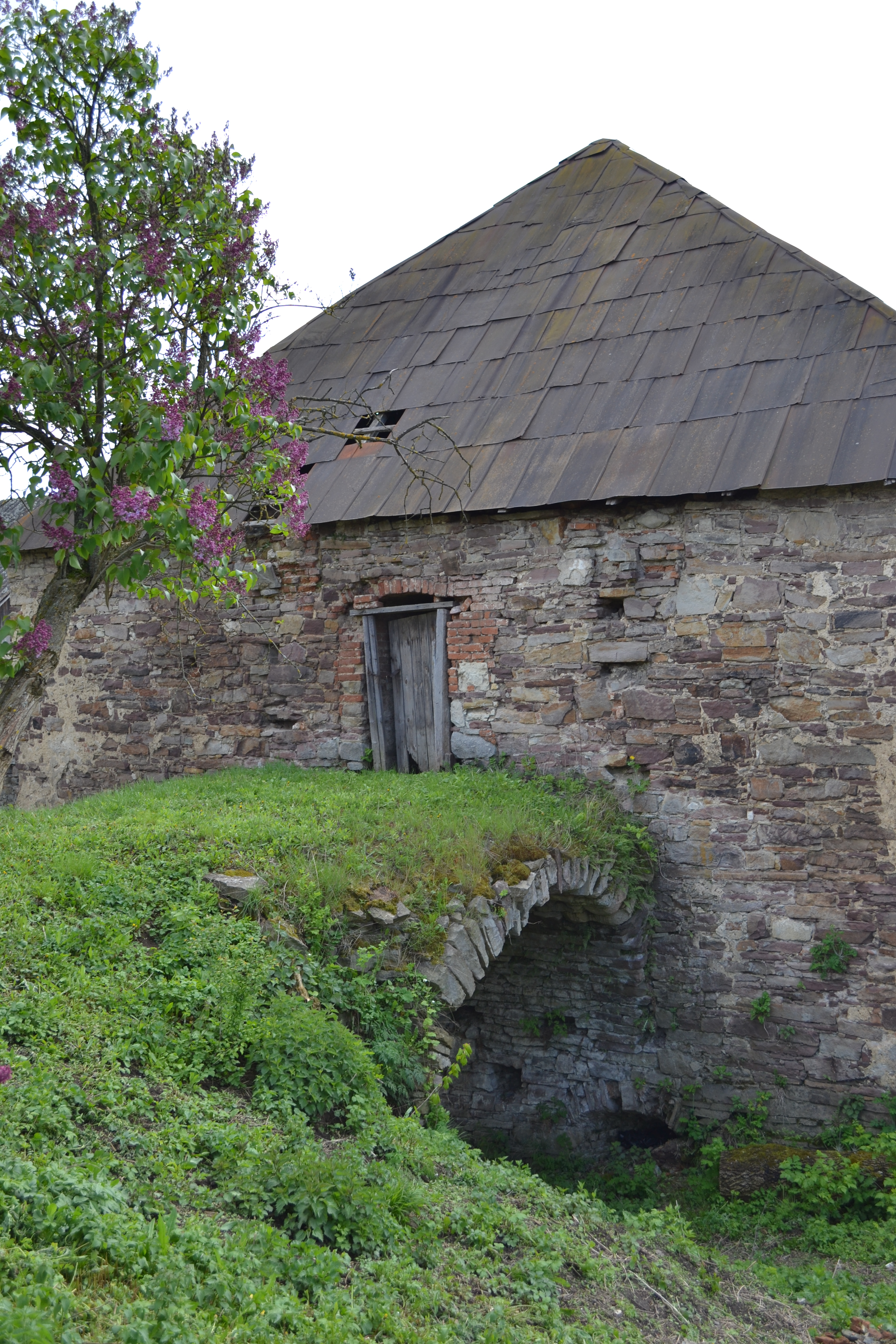
Remnants of Potocki Castle

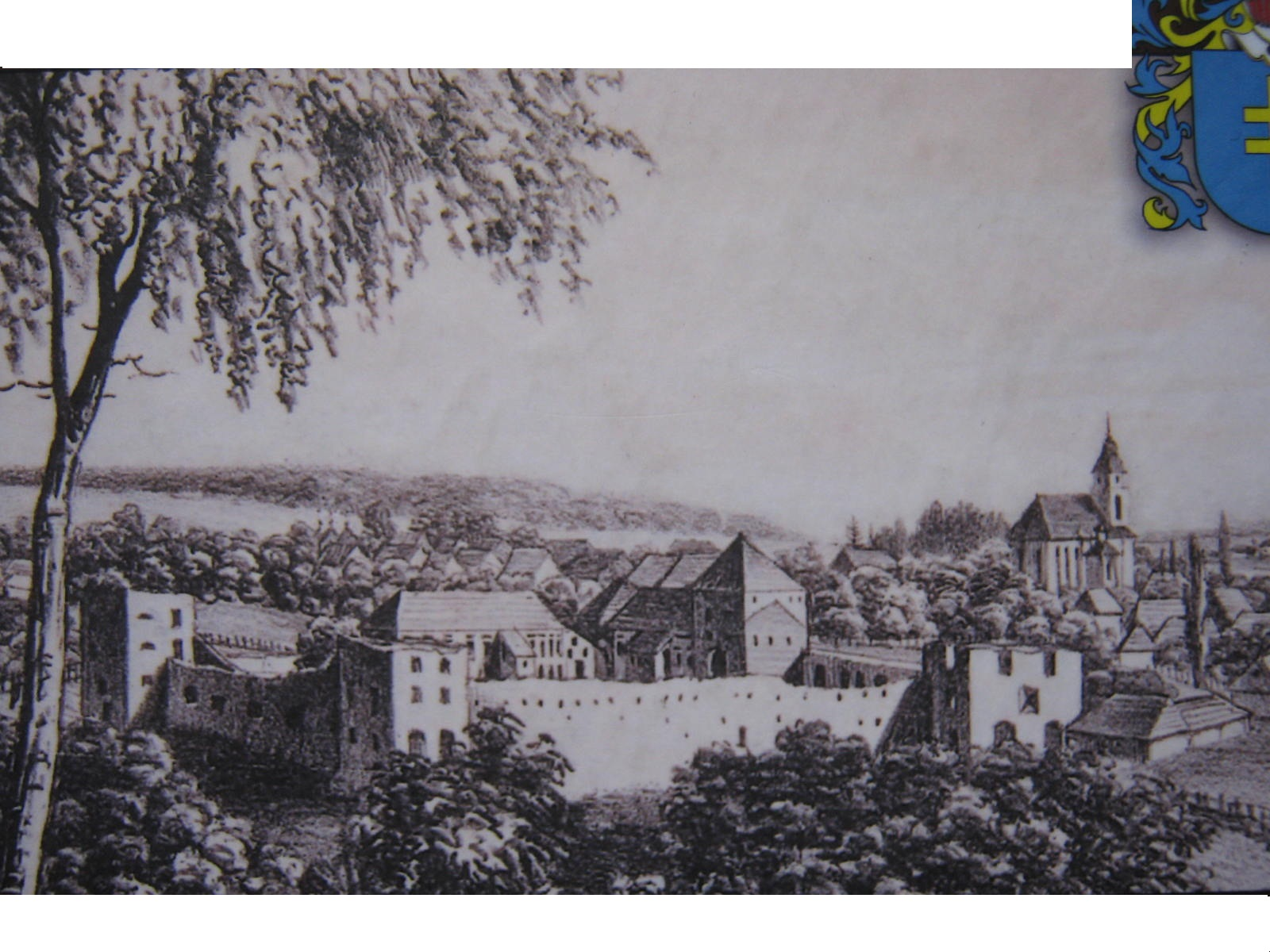
Old depiction of full castle

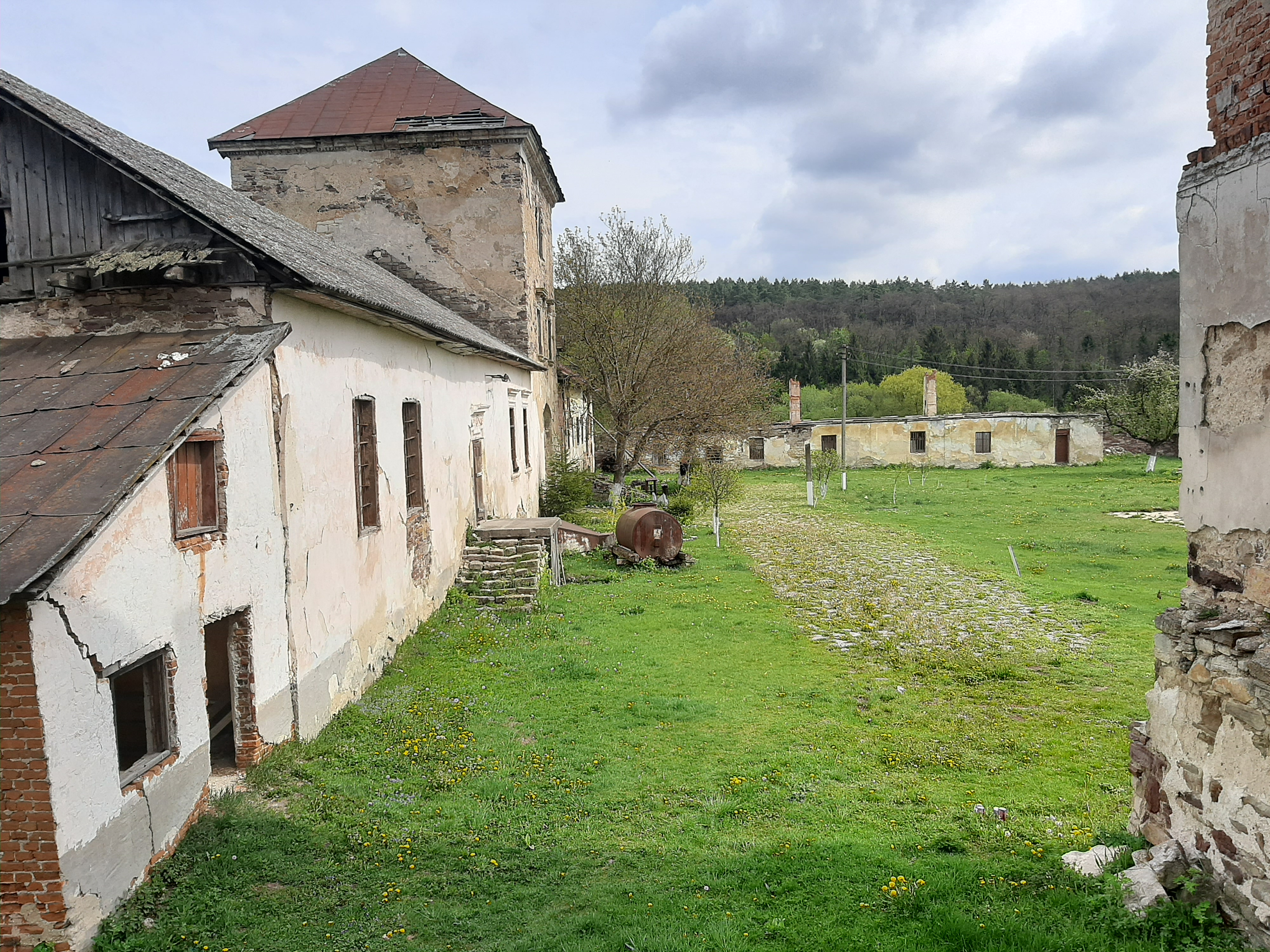
Parts of the village

== See also ==
- Aerial Tour of Zloty Potok Castle - Youtube
- Inside of Zloty Potok Castle - YouTube
- Hayivka Festival - YouTube
- Balalaika Player in Zlotyi Potik - YouTube
- Medical Worker Strike in Zolotyi Potok - YouTube

== Sources ==
- (in Ukrainian) О. Наливайко, В. Уніят, Золотий Потік // Ternopil Encyclopedic Dictionary: in 4 v. / editorial board: H. Yavorskyi and other, Ternopil: "Zbruch", 2004, V. 1: А—Й, S. 658-659. — ISBN 966-528-197-6.
- (in Polish) Skrzypecki, Henryk Tomasz (2010). // Potok Złoty na tle historii polskich kresów południowo-wschodnich // Opole: Solpress. pp. 88–89. ISBN 978-83-927244-4-5
