= 1966–67 A Group =

23rd season of top-tier football league in Bulgaria

A Group
- Season: 1966–67
- Champions: Botev Plovdiv (2nd title)
- Relegated: Dunav; Marek
- European Cup: Botev Plovdiv
- Inter-Cities Fairs Cup: Lokomotiv Plovdiv
- Matches played: 240
- Goals scored: 562 (2.34 per match)
- Top goalscorer: Petar Zhekov (21 goals)

The 1966–67 A Group was the 19th season of the A Football Group, the top Bulgarian professional league for association football clubs, since its establishment in 1948.

== Overview ==
It was contested by 16 teams, and Botev Plovdiv won the championship.

== League standings ==
| Pos | Team | Pld | W | D | L | GF | GA | GD | Pts | Qualification or relegation |
|---|---|---|---|---|---|---|---|---|---|---|
| 1 | Botev Plovdiv (C) | 30 | 13 | 12 | 5 | 39 | 24 | +15 | 38 | Qualification for European Cup first round |
| 2 | Slavia Sofia | 30 | 13 | 11 | 6 | 33 | 27 | +6 | 37 | |
| 3 | Levski Sofia | 30 | 13 | 10 | 7 | 46 | 32 | +14 | 36 | Qualification for Cup Winners' Cup first round |
| 4 | Spartak Sofia | 30 | 13 | 9 | 8 | 40 | 26 | +14 | 35 | |
| 5 | CSKA Sofia | 30 | 11 | 12 | 7 | 42 | 34 | +8 | 34 | |
| 6 | Cherno More Varna | 30 | 12 | 9 | 9 | 40 | 29 | +11 | 33 | |
| 7 | Botev Vratsa | 30 | 13 | 6 | 11 | 45 | 40 | +5 | 32 | |
| 8 | Lokomotiv Sofia | 30 | 12 | 7 | 11 | 39 | 34 | +5 | 31 | |
| 9 | Chernomorets Burgas | 30 | 10 | 10 | 10 | 38 | 35 | +3 | 30 | |
| 10 | Beroe Stara Zagora | 30 | 10 | 9 | 11 | 37 | 41 | −4 | 29 | |
| 11 | Lokomotiv Plovdiv | 30 | 7 | 14 | 9 | 30 | 31 | −1 | 28 | Invitation for Inter-Cities Fairs Cup first round |
| 12 | Dobrudzha Dobrich | 30 | 9 | 8 | 13 | 24 | 43 | −19 | 26 | |
| 13 | Spartak Plovdiv | 30 | 10 | 5 | 15 | 26 | 35 | −9 | 25 | |
| 14 | Minyor Pernik | 30 | 6 | 11 | 13 | 24 | 30 | −6 | 23 | |
| 15 | Dunav Ruse (R) | 30 | 9 | 4 | 17 | 35 | 60 | −25 | 22 | Relegation to 1967–68 B Group |
| 16 | Marek Dupnitsa (R) | 30 | 8 | 5 | 17 | 24 | 41 | −17 | 21 | Relegation to 1967–68 B Group |

Source: rsssf.com
(C) Champions; (R) Relegated

== Results ==
| Home \ Away | BSZ | BPD | BVR | CHM | CHB | CSK | DOB | DUN | LEV | LPL | LSO | MAR | MIN | SLA | SSF | SPD |
|---|---|---|---|---|---|---|---|---|---|---|---|---|---|---|---|---|
| Beroe Stara Zagora | | 0–0 | 1–0 | 2–0 | 2–2 | 1–1 | 1–0 | 5–1 | 1–1 | 1–3 | 2–1 | 2–0 | 1–1 | 2–2 | 3–1 | 3–0 |
| Botev Plovdiv | 3–0 | | 1–0 | 0–0 | 1–1 | 1–1 | 1–1 | 6–0 | 1–1 | 1–1 | 0–1 | 2–1 | 1–0 | 2–0 | 0–0 | 0–1 |
| Botev Vratsa | 1–0 | 0–1 | | 3–1 | 4–0 | 4–0 | 3–0 | 3–0 | 2–1 | 3–2 | 2–1 | 0–0 | 3–1 | 1–0 | 2–2 | 3–0 |
| Cherno More | 1–3 | 1–1 | 4–2 | | 0–0 | 0–0 | 6–2 | 2–1 | 2–2 | 0–0 | 1–0 | 2–0 | 2–0 | 2–1 | 2–0 | 3–0 |
| Chernomorets Burgas | 1–0 | 0–1 | 2–0 | 1–0 | | 0–0 | 1–0 | 1–1 | 2–3 | 1–1 | 4–0 | 5–1 | 0–0 | 1–1 | 1–1 | 3–1 |
| CSKA Sofia | 1–1 | 1–3 | 2–2 | 1–1 | 3–2 | | 5–1 | 3–0 | 3–1 | 0–0 | 1–1 | 3–0 | 1–0 | 1–1 | 0–1 | 4–0 |
| Dobrudzha Dobrich | 3–2 | 1–1 | 1–1 | 0–0 | 1–3 | 1–0 | | 2–0 | 1–1 | 1–0 | 1–1 | 1–3 | 1–0 | 0–0 | 1–0 | 1–0 |
| Dunav Ruse | 1–0 | 4–2 | 5–1 | 1–2 | 2–0 | 1–2 | 0–1 | | 2–1 | 1–1 | 4–1 | 3–0 | 0–1 | 2–2 | 1–0 | 1–0 |
| Levski Sofia | 4–1 | 1–2 | 2–1 | 2–1 | 1–0 | 1–1 | 2–0 | 3–0 | | 0–0 | 0–0 | 3–1 | 2–1 | 1–1 | 1–2 | 3–0 |
| Lokomotiv Plovdiv | 2–0 | 0–1 | 1–1 | 2–1 | 0–1 | 2–1 | 1–1 | 3–2 | 2–4 | | 1–2 | 2–0 | 0–0 | 1–2 | 0–0 | 2–2 |
| Lokomotiv Sofia | 4–1 | 2–0 | 0–1 | 1–3 | 3–1 | 5–1 | 0–1 | 4–0 | 1–3 | 0–0 | | 1–0 | 1–0 | 3–1 | 1–2 | 1–2 |
| Marek Dupnitsa | 0–0 | 1–3 | 4–0 | 1–0 | 2–1 | 0–1 | 1–0 | 2–0 | 1–1 | 2–0 | 0–1 | | 2–1 | 1–1 | 1–2 | 0–0 |
| Minyor Pernik | 0–0 | 1–2 | 2–2 | 0–0 | 0–0 | 1–2 | 2–0 | 4–1 | 0–1 | 2–2 | 1–1 | 3–0 | | 0–0 | 1–0 | 2–0 |
| Slavia Sofia | 2–0 | 1–1 | 1–0 | 1–0 | 3–2 | 2–1 | 1–0 | 1–0 | 2–0 | 1–0 | 1–1 | 1–0 | 0–0 | | 2–1 | 1–0 |
| Spartak Sofia | 1–2 | 3–1 | 3–0 | 1–0 | 3–1 | 1–1 | 3–1 | 7–1 | 0–0 | 0–0 | 0–0 | 1–0 | 2–0 | 2–1 | | 1–1 |
| Spartak Plovdiv | 4–0 | 0–0 | 2–0 | 1–3 | 0–1 | 0–1 | 4–0 | 0–0 | 1–0 | 0–1 | 0–1 | 1–0 | 3–0 | 2–0 | 1–0 | |

Source: A PFG (in Bulgarian)
Legend: Blue = home team win; Yellow = draw; Red = away team win.

== Champions ==
Botev Plovdiv

Goalkeepers
| (Bulgaria) Mihail Karushkov | 30 | (0) |
| (Bulgaria) Georgi Naydenov | 2 | (0) |

Defenders
| (Bulgaria) Ivan Zaduma | 26 | (0) |
| (Bulgaria) Ivan Gluhchev | 27 | (0) |
| (Bulgaria) Nenko Georgiev | 25 | (0) |
| (Bulgaria) Vidin Apostolov | 29 | (0) |
| (Bulgaria) Rayko Stoynov | 29 | (1) |

Midfielders
| (Bulgaria) Dimitar Kostadinov | 29 | (2) |
| (Bulgaria) Bozhidar Atanasov | 18 | (0) |
| (Bulgaria) Nikola Ivanov | 9 | (0) |
| (Bulgaria) Ivan Kyuchukov | 24 | (1) |
| (Bulgaria) Kostadin Bichev | 2 | (0) |
| (Bulgaria) Ivan Bachkov | 8 | (0) |

Forwards
| (Bulgaria) Dinko Dermendzhiev | 29 | (14) |
| (Bulgaria) Vangel Delev | 2 | (0) |
| (Bulgaria) Dimitar Tortolanov | 1 | (0) |
| (Bulgaria) Georgi Popov | 24 | (12) |
| (Bulgaria) Dobrin Nenov | 29 | (9) |
| (Bulgaria) Petar Terziev | 1 | (0) |

Manager
| (Bulgaria) Vasil Spasov |

== Top scorers ==
| Rank | Scorer | Club | Goals |
|---|---|---|---|
| 1 | (Bulgaria) Petar Zhekov | Beroe Stara Zagora | 21 |
| 2 | (Bulgaria) Dinko Dermendzhiev | Botev Plovdiv | 14 |
| 2 | (Bulgaria) Nikola Yordanov | Dunav Ruse | 14 |
| 2 | (Bulgaria) Stefan Bogomilov | Cherno More Varna | 14 |
| 5 | (Bulgaria) Iliya Dragomirov | Botev Vratsa | 13 |
| 6 | (Bulgaria) Nikola Tsanev | CSKA Sofia | 12 |
| 6 | (Bulgaria) Georgi Popov | Botev Plovdiv | 12 |
| 8 | (Bulgaria) Dimitar Tsekov | Lokomotiv Sofia | 11 |
| 8 | (Bulgaria) Dimitar Yakimov | CSKA Sofia | 11 |
| 8 | (Bulgaria) Yancho Dimitrov | Beroe Stara Zagora | 11 |
| 8 | (Bulgaria) Georgi Kamenov | Botev Vratsa | 11 |
| 8 | (Bulgaria) Hristo Bonev | Lokomotiv Plovdiv | 11 |
