= Michał Komaszyński =

Polish historian

Michał Komaszyński (b. 23 February 1924 in Potok Złoty, d. 12 December 2007 in Katowice) was a Polish historian.

Michał Komaszyński was born in Potok Złoty. When he was child, his family relocated to Trembowla.

He studied in Lille and Toruń. From 1953 to 1957 he worked at the Polish Academy of Sciences. In 1958 he defended his PhD thesis. From 1976 he was working at the University of Silesia in Katowice. In 1979 he gained a title of professor.

== Books ==
- 1000 lat Wrocławia (Wrocław 1960)
- Wrocław nowy i najnowszy (Wrocław 1965)
- Niefortunna wyprawa księcia Contiego po koronę Sobieskiego (Warszawa 1971)
- Jan III Sobieski a Bałtyk (Gdańsk 1983)
- Maria Kazimiera d'Arquien Sobieska, królowa Polski (1641-1715) (Kraków 1983)
