= Naberezhne, Ternopil Oblast =

Naberezhne Набережне
- Interactive map of Naberezhne
- Coordinates: 48°51′07″N 25°13′13″E
- Country: Ukraine
- Oblast: Ternopil Oblast
- Raion: Chortkiv Raion

Area
  - Total: 0.576 km^{2} (0.222 sq mi)

Population (2001 census)
  - Total: 232
  - Density: 402.78/km^{2} (1,043.2/sq mi)
- Time zone: UTC+2 (EET)
  - Summer (DST): UTC+3 (EEST)
- Postal code: 48454
- Area code: +380 3544

Naberezhne (Ukrainian: Набережне) is a village in Chortkiv Raion (district) of Ternopil Oblast (province) in western Ukraine. It belongs to Zolotyi Potik settlement hromada, one of the hromadas of Ukraine. The Dniester river) flows near of the village.

== History ==
First written mention comes from the 18th century. Known as Povyia, a prysilok (remote part of the village) of Kosmyryn. It belonged to the Polish–Lithuanian Commonwealth, from 1772 until 1918 to Austrian (Habsburg monarchy, Austrian Empire, Austria-Hungary) empires, in 1918–1919 to West Ukrainian People's Republic. From 1991 belonged to Ukraine.

Reading room of Ukrainian society Prosvita operated in the village.

Until 18 July 2020, Naberezhne belonged to Buchach Raion. The raion was abolished in July 2020 as part of the administrative reform of Ukraine, which reduced the number of raions of Ternopil Oblast to three. The area of Buchach Raion was merged into Chortkiv Raion.

== Sources ==
- (in Ukrainian) І. Гальчук, Набережне // Ternopil Encyclopedic Dictionary: in 4 v. / editorial board: H. Yavorskyi and other, Ternopil: "Zbruch", 2005, V. 2: К—О, S. 587. — ISBN 966-528-199-2.
