= Hegewald (colony) =

Short-lived WW2 German colony near Zhytomyr, Ukraine

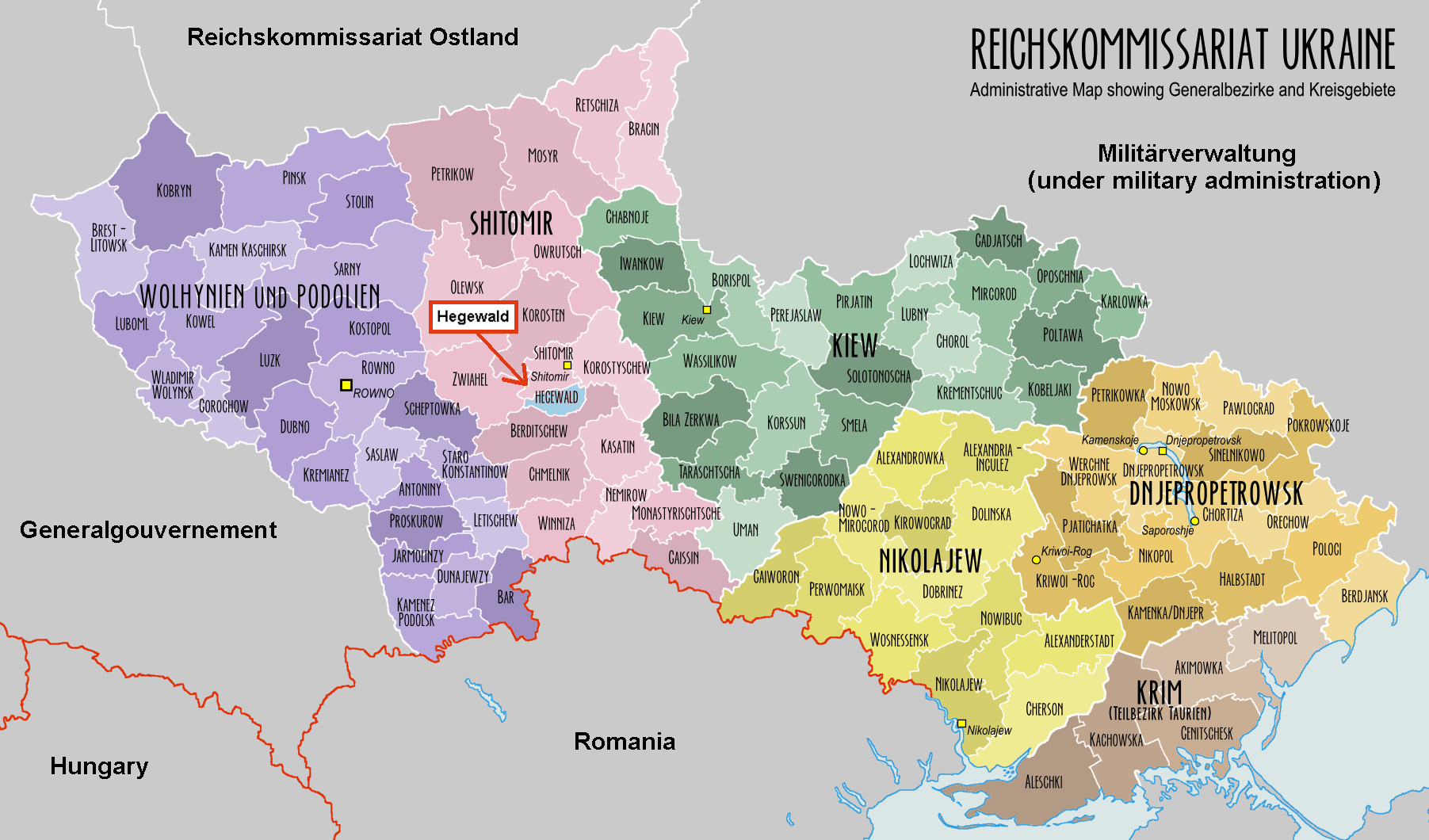
Location of the Hegewald colony, situated directly south of Zhytomyr

Hegewald was a short-lived German colony during World War II, situated near Zhytomyr in Reichskommissariat Ukraine. It was settled in late 1942 and early 1943 by Volksdeutsche settlers transferred from the occupied territories of Poland, Croatia, Bessarabia, and the Soviet Union to an area earmarked for the projected Germanization of the Ukrainian lands. Plans were prepared months in advance by the SS, RKFDV and VoMi, but major problems with supplies occurred right from the region's initial establishment. Heinrich Himmler's original plans to recruit settlers from Scandinavia and the Netherlands were unsuccessful.

== History ==
Heinrich Himmler announced plans to establish a Volksdeutsche colony at Hegewald in September, 1942. The initial scheme proved difficult to implement for a number of reasons, including reluctance and fear among many Volksdeutsche owing to partisan activities in the Hegewald area. Elaborate guidelines were set up to prepare the locations. The new settlers were to receive the homes of killed or evicted Ukrainian peasants, as well as their furniture, livestock, and food; furthermore, new schools were to be built. This required a massive deportation effort, mostly on foot, carried out in October 1942. Most homes were in terrible shape by German standards. There was a considerable shortage of lumber, and general lack of winter clothing and shoes.

The Ukrainian and Polish-German settlers arrived by train, having been forcibly removed from their homes, to be doled out plots of land and informed of their quotas. They received use, but not ownership, of the land assigned to them.

Neither the deported Ukrainians nor the ethnic Germans received more than a few hours' notice of their relocation. Despite damage to the houses, most could be made functional before snowfall. Elaborate Christmas pageants were set up, deliberately irreligious, to celebrate the return of light and to contrast it to the "dark powers" surrounding Germany, and gifts and food were provided.

All did not go as planned. The intended preparations were undermined by filching of craftsmen, and neither food nor clothing arrived as promised. Furthermore, many evicted Ukrainians returned to the area. Efforts were made to continue, with members of the League of German Girls being sent even when they had to receive gas masks and soldier escorts, but by November 1943 the inhabitants were in flight before the Red Army. These were the first of the massive evacuations of Germans from Eastern Europe.

== Villages ==
The colony consisted of 27 villages, all renamed in German; they were situated along the Zhytomyr-Berdychiv road. The villages reverted to their Ukrainian names after the war.

- Schröbelesberg – Zarichany (Зарічани)
- Neuheimat – Pryazhiv (Пряжів)
- Bubenhausen – Volytsya (Волиця)
- Neubiesing – Holovenka (Головенка)
- Pfenningstadt – Vyshneve (Вишневе)
- Heimkehr – Stavetsʹke (Ставецьке)
- Troja – Troyaniv (Троянів)
- Reichstreu – Ozeryanka (Озерянка)
- Preuersdorf – Rizhky (Ріжки)
- Arbeit – Solotvyn (Солотвин)
- Fleiß – Hlynivtsi (Глинівці)
- Au – Stepok (Степок)
- Zehnhub – Vershyna (Вершина)
- Neuposen – Kodnya (Кодня)
- Altposen – Kodnya (Кодня)
- Bosfershof – Pavlenkivka (Павленківка)
- Wertingen – Vertokyyivka (Вертокиївка)
- Heinrichsfeld – Ivankivtsi (Іванківці)
- Reinharding – Horodyshche (Городище)
- Am Hügel – Luka (Лука)
- Klein Lüneburg – Lishchyn (Ліщин)
- Neu Trudering – Lishchyn (Ліщин)
- Mödersdorf – Mlynyshche (Млинище)
- Tiefenbach – Pisky (Піски)
- Sachsenhard – Skomorokhy (Скоморохи)
- Maienfeld – Sinhury (Сінгури)
- Ichstingen – Myrolyubivka (Миролюбівка)

== See also ==
- Wehrbauer
