= Kostilnyky =

Village in Chortkiv Raion, Ukraine

Kostilnyky Кості́льники
- Location within Ternopil Oblast Location within Ukraine
- Coordinates: 48°59′03″N 25°35′51″E
- Country: Ukraine
- Oblast: Ternopil Oblast
- Raion: Chortkiv Raion
- Hromada: Zolotyi Potik settlement hromada

Area
  - Total: 1.63 km^{2} (0.63 sq mi)

Population (2001 census)
  - Total: 1,037
  - Density: 628.83/km^{2} (1,628.7/sq mi)
- Time zone: UTC+2 (EET)
  - Summer (DST): UTC+3 (EEST)
- Postal code: 48454
- Area code: +380 3544

Kostilnyky (Ukrainian: Кості́льники) is a Ukrainian village in the Zolotyi Potik settlement hromada, in the Chortkiv Raion of the Ternopil Oblast. It is located on the Dniester River.

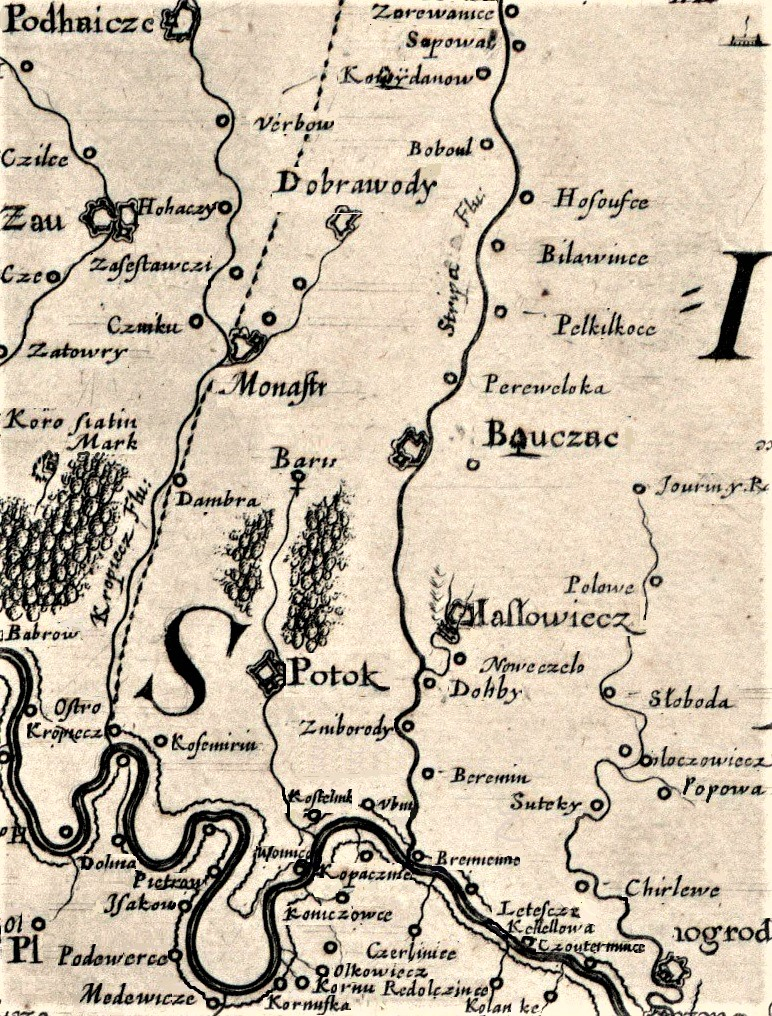
1650 Map of the Buchach Region/Dniester River Valley

In accordance with the Cabinet of Ministers of Ukraine, the village became part of the Zolotyi Potik settlement hromada in 2020.

It is located 25 km from the nearest railway station in Buchach. It had a population of 1,037 as of 2003.

== History ==
Archeological sites from the Paleolithic era were discovered near the village.

The town was first mentioned in the 16th century.

Rittmeister Andrzej Potocki, along with his brothers and stepfather owned the village of Kostilniki in the Ruthenian Voivodeship of Galicia, along with Sokoliv and Unizh.

Josyf Gavrilo Sheptytsky (1806–1855), member of the Sejm of the Estates, son of Jan Baptist Sheptutsky (1770–1831), Lawyer of the Emperor's Subcommittee, Stryjko Count Ivan Kantiy Sheptytskyi, and Josyf's brother Peter Pavel Leopold (1808–1843) inherited in equal parts the estate in the villages of Kostilniki, Prylbychi, Tulkovichi, and Hankovychi.

The Prosvita cooperative operated in the village.
