= Rublyn =

Village in Ternopil Oblast, Ukraine

Rublyn Рублин
- Village
- Location within Ternopil Oblast Location within Ukraine
- Coordinates: 48°54′20″N 25°17′24″E
- Country: Ukraine
- Oblast: Ternopil Oblast
- Raion: Chortkiv
- Hromada: Zolotyi Potik

Area
  - Total: 2.00 km^{2} (0.77 sq mi)
- Elevation: 323 m (1,060 ft)

Population
  - Total: 286
  - Density: 143/km^{2} (370/sq mi)
- Time zone: UTC+2 (EET)
  - Summer (DST): UTC+3 (EEST)

Rublyn is a village in Zolotyi Potik settlement Hromada, Chortkiv Raion, Ternopil Oblast, Ukraine. It had a population of 286.

== Geography ==
Rublyn is located to the east of the Barysh River, about 39 kilometres northeast of the Raion seat Chortkiv. It has an average altitude of 323 metres (1,060 ft) above the sea level.

== Climate ==
Rublyn has a Humid Continental Climate (Dfb). Its wettest month is July, with an average precipitation of 111 mm; and the driest month is January, with an average precipitation of 39 mm.

Climate data for Rublyn
Month	Jan	Feb	Mar	Apr	May	Jun	Jul	Aug	Sep	Oct	Nov	Dec	Year
Mean daily maximum °C (°F)	−0.6 (30.9)	1.4 (34.5)	6.9 (44.4)	14.4 (57.9)	19.6 (67.3)	22.8 (73.0)	24.5 (76.1)	24.3 (75.7)	19.1 (66.4)	12.8 (55.0)	6.8 (44.2)	1.4 (34.5)	12.8 (55.0)
Daily mean °C (°F)	−3.2 (26.2)	−1.7 (28.9)	2.7 (36.9)	9.6 (49.3)	15.0 (59.0)	18.4 (65.1)	20.2 (68.4)	19.8 (67.6)	14.9 (58.8)	8.9 (48.0)	3.8 (38.8)	−1.0 (30.2)	9.0 (48.1)
Mean daily minimum °C (°F)	−6.1 (21.0)	−5.0 (23.0)	−1.5 (29.3)	4.4 (39.9)	9.7 (49.5)	13.6 (56.5)	15.6 (60.1)	15.2 (59.4)	10.7 (51.3)	5.4 (41.7)	1.2 (34.2)	−3.5 (25.7)	5.0 (41.0)
Average rainfall mm (inches)	39 (1.5)	43 (1.7)	53 (2.1)	60 (2.4)	84 (3.3)	99 (3.9)	111 (4.4)	77 (3.0)	69 (2.7)	51 (2.0)	45 (1.8)	47 (1.9)	778 (30.7)
Source: Climate-Data.org
