= Zolotyi Potik settlement hromada =

Hromada in Ternopil Oblast, Ukraine

Zolotyi Potik settlement hromada Золотопотіцька селищна громада
- hromada
- Location within Ternopil Oblast Location within Ukraine
- Coordinates: 48°54′27″N 25°20′18″E
- Country: Ukraine
- Oblast (province): Ternopil Oblast
- Raion (district): Chortkiv Raion
- Administrative center: Zolotyi Potik

Area
  - Total: 160.2 km^{2} (61.9 sq mi)

Population (2020)
  - Total: 15,244
  - Density: 95.16/km^{2} (246.5/sq mi)
- Cities: 1
- Villages: 20
- Website: zolotopoticka-gromada.gov.ua

Zolotyi Potik settlement territorial hromada (Ukrainian: Золотопотіцька селищна територіальна громада, romanized: Zolotopotitska selyshchna terytorialna hromada) is a Ukrainian hromada in the Chortkiv Raion of the Ternopil Oblast. The administrative center is the urban-type settlement of Zolotyi Potik.

The area of the hromada is 160.2 km^{2}, and the population was 15,244 as of 2020.

It was formed on 29 July 2015, by merging Zolotyi Potik with the villages of Vozyliv, Kostilnytsia, Mykolaivka, Rusylivka, Skomoroska, Snovydivka, and Sokolivka of the Buchach Raion.

== Settlements ==
The community includes 1 urban-type settlement (Zolotyi Potik) and 14 villages:

- Vosilov
- Hubyn
- Kosmyryn
- Kostilnyky
- Naberezhne
- Mykolaivka
- Mlynky
- Rublyn
- Rusyliv
- Skomorokhy
- Snovydiv
- Sokilets
- Sokoliv
- Stinka
