= Skomorokhy =

Skomorokhy (Ukrainian: Скоморохи) may refer to the following places in Ukraine:

- Skomorokhy, Lviv Oblast, village in Chervonohrad Raion, Lviv Oblast
- Skomorokhy, Chortkiv Raion, Ternopil Oblast, village in Chortkiv Raion, Ternopil Oblast
- Skomorokhy, Ternopil Raion, Ternopil Oblast, village in Ternopil Raion, Ternopil Oblast
- Skomorokhy, Zhytomyr Oblast, village in Zhytomyr Raion, Zhytomyr Oblast
