= Mykolaivka, Ternopil Oblast =

Rural locality in Ternopil Oblast, Ukraine

Mykolaivka Миколаївка
- Location in Ternopil Oblast
- Coordinates: 48°51′40″N 25°23′49″E
- Country: Ukraine
- Oblast: Ternopil Oblast
- Raion: Chortkiv Raion
- Hromada: Zolotyi Potik settlement hromada
- Time zone: UTC+2 (EET)
  - Summer (DST): UTC+3 (EEST)
- Postal code: 48465

Mykolaivka (Ukrainian: Миколаївка) is a village in Zolotyi Potik settlement hromada, Chortkiv Raion, Ternopil Oblast, Ukraine.

== History ==
It was first mentioned in writings in 1850.

After the liquidation of the Buchach Raion on 19 July 2020, the village became part of the Chortkiv Raion.

== Religion ==
- Saints Peter and Paul church (1990, brick).

== Sources ==
- (in Ukrainian) Гладун В., Бігус М., Миколаївка // Ternopil Encyclopedic Dictionary: in 4 v. / editorial board: H. Yavorskyi and other, Ternopil: "Zbruch", 2005, V. 2: К—О, S. 510. — ISBN 966-528-199-2.
- "Mikołajówka, cz. Hubina, pow. buczacki". Geographical Dictionary of the Kingdom of Poland (in Polish). 6. Warszawa: Kasa im. Józefa Mianowskiego. 1885. p. 407.
