= Dniester Canyon National Nature Park =

National park in Ukraine

- Ukrainian: Національний природний парк «Дністровський каньйон»
- IUCN category II (national park)
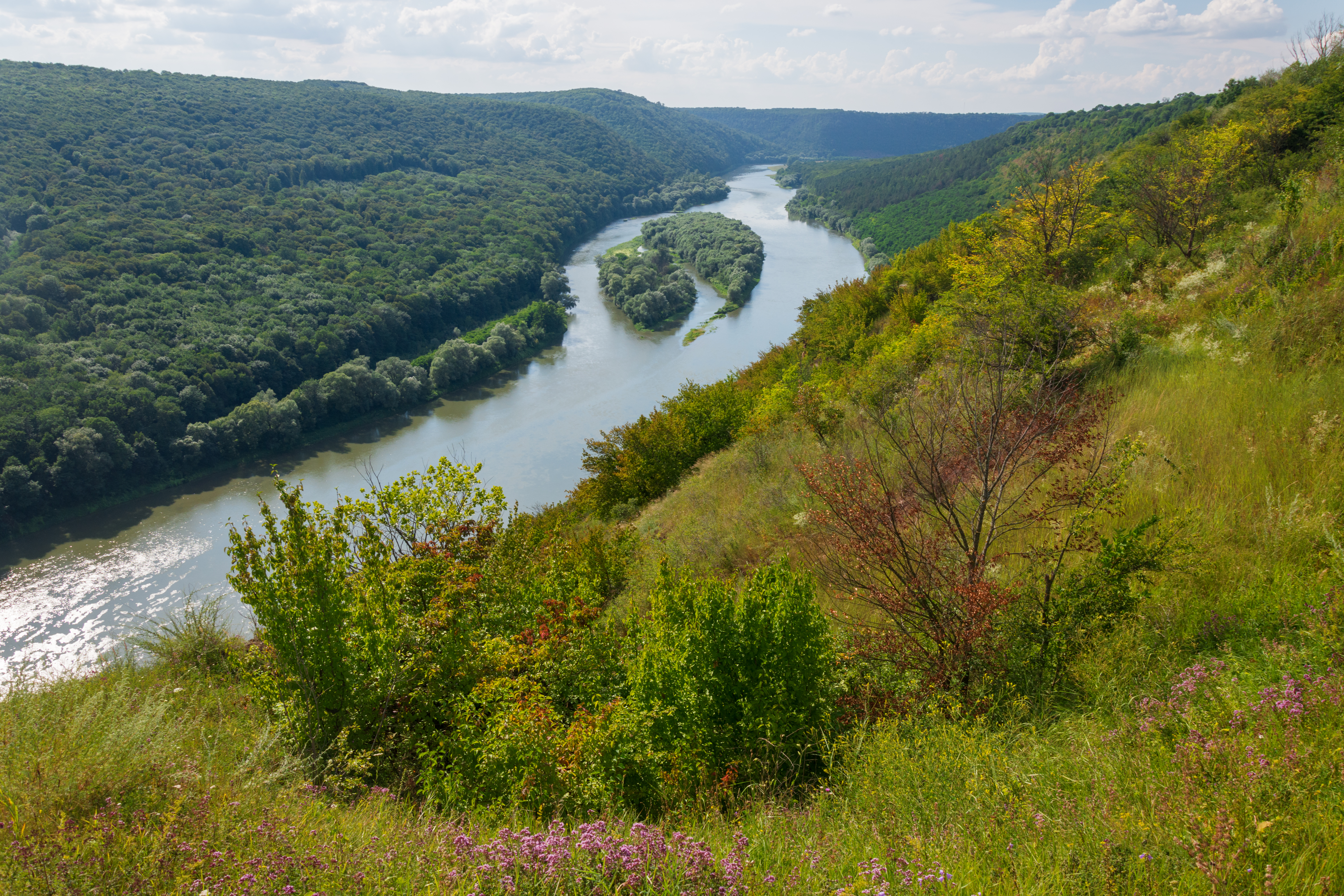
- Dniester Canyon National Nature Park

- Location within Ukraine
- Location: Ternopil Oblast
- Nearest city: Zalishchyky
- Coordinates: 48.65°N 25.735°E
- Area: 10,829.18 hectares (26,759 acres; 108 km^{2}; 42 sq mi)
- Established: 2010
- Governing body: Ministry of Ecology and Natural Resources (Ukraine)
- Website: http://dnistercanyon.pp.ua/index.php/en/

The Dniester Canyon National Nature Park (Ukrainian: Національний природний парк «Дністровський каньйон», romanized: Dnistrovs'kyj kan'jon) follows Dniester Canyon, the largest canyon in Ukraine, along the middle course of the Dniester River. It protects a relatively undeveloped portion of the Ukrainian forest-steppe landscape, about 75 km east of the Carpathian Mountains in western Ukraine, and about 400 km southwest of Kyiv. The canyon is known for its varied geological formations, including two of the longest caves in the world. It is in the administrative district of Chortkiv Raion in Ternopil Oblast.

== Topography ==
The park's boundaries follow the Dniester River for 100 km as it flows from northwest to southeast in western Ukraine. For much of this length, the park is only about 5 – 10 km wide, centered on the river. There are over 50 significant caves in the park, cut in the Travertine rock. These include the Ozerna (105 km) and Optymistychna (230 km) caves. The largest waterfall in Ukraine – Dzhurynskyi – is in the park. As with most National Nature Parks in Ukraine, the main park includes many smaller nature reserves, local park sites, historical monuments and natural attractions open to public visits.

== Climate and ecoregion ==
The official climate designation for the Dniester Canyon area is 'Humid continental climate – warm summer sub-type' (Köppen climate classification Dfb), with large seasonal temperature differentials and a warm summer (at least four months averaging over 10 °C (50 °F), but no month averaging over 22 °C (72 °F). The park is in the southern edge of the Central European mixed forests ecoregion.

== Public use ==
The park is sectioned into four zones: a reserved zone, a regulated recreation zone, a stationary recreation zone and a business zone. There are a number of tourist trails and much of the territory is near developed areas for services.

== See also ==
- National Parks of Ukraine
