= Dniester Canyon =

Canyon in Ternopil Oblast, Ukraine

- Дністровський каньйон
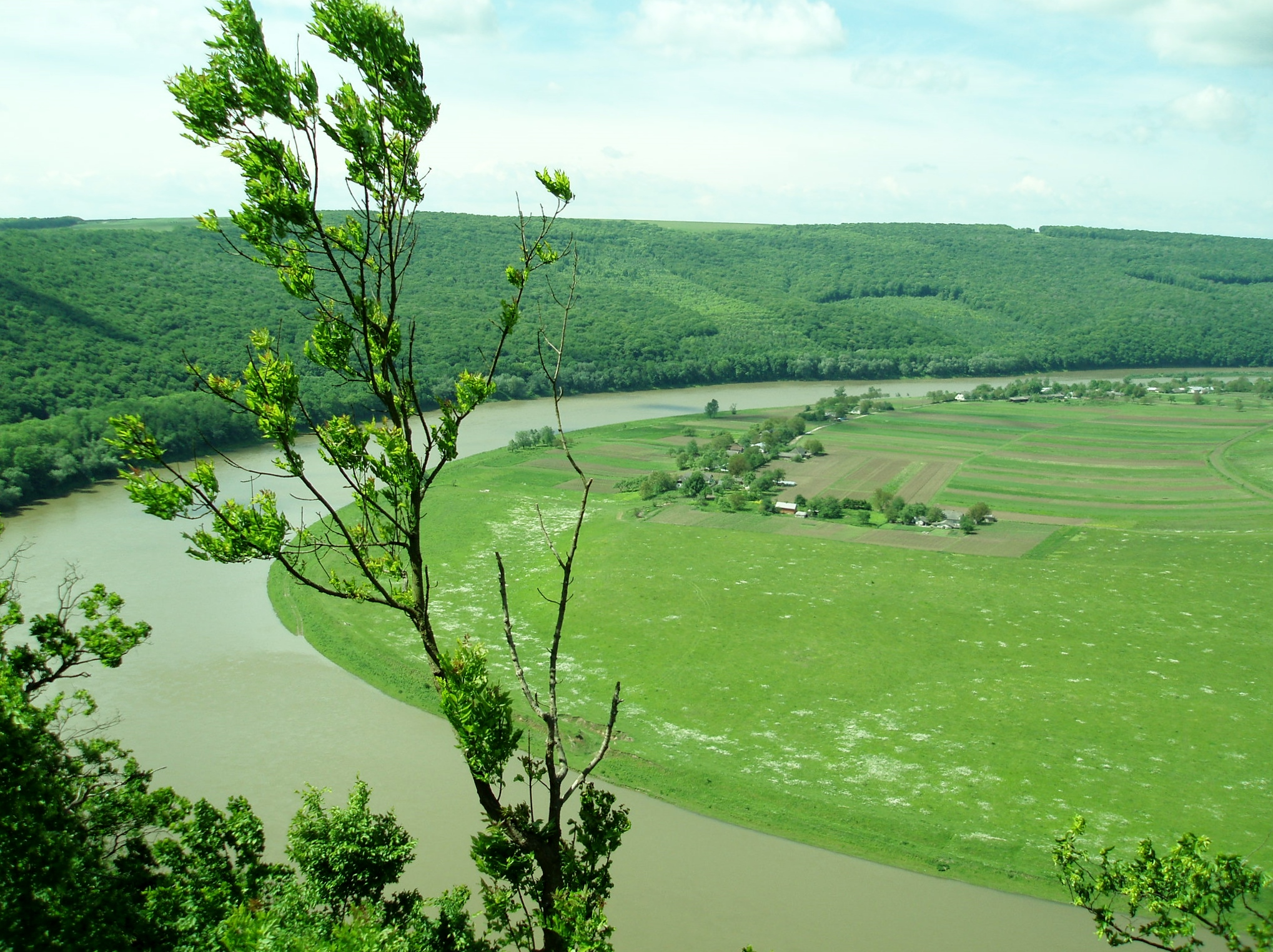
- Dniester landscape in West Ukraine

- Location within Ukraine
- Length: 250 kilometres (160 mi)
- Depth: 100–200 metres (330–660 ft)

Geography
- Location: Ternopil, Ivano-Frankivsk, Chernivtsi, and Khmelnytskyi Oblasts, Ukraine
- Population centers: Chortkiv Raion
- Coordinates: 48°37′14.9″N 26°02′40″E
- Interactive map of Dniester Canyon

The Dniester Canyon is a canyon formed by the Dniester River, located inside the Dniester River Valley in parts of Ternopil, Ivano-Frankivsk, Chernivtsi, and Khmelnytskyi Oblasts in southwestern Ukraine. On February 3, 2010, the regional landscape park around the canyon was promoted to the status of national nature park, becoming the Dniester Canyon National Nature Park.

== Overview ==
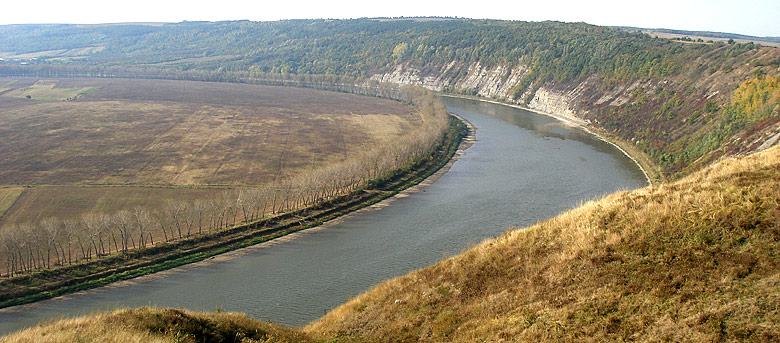
Dniester Canyon at the village of Pylypche, Chortkiv Raion, Ternopil Oblast of western Ukraine

Dniester Canyon is located in southwestern Ukraine along a 250 km (160 mi) segment of the Dniester, extending from the mouth of Zolota Lypa River, near the village of Nyzhniv, Ivano-Frankivsk Oblast, to the Dniester Hydroelectric Station near Novodnistrovsk, Chernivtsi Oblast. It covers parts of Ternopil, Ivano-Frankivsk, Chernivtsi, and Khmelnytskyi Oblasts. It is situated on the Podolian Upland and Khotyn Upland, northeast of the Carpathian Mountains.

The canyon reaches a depth of 100–200 m (330–660 ft).

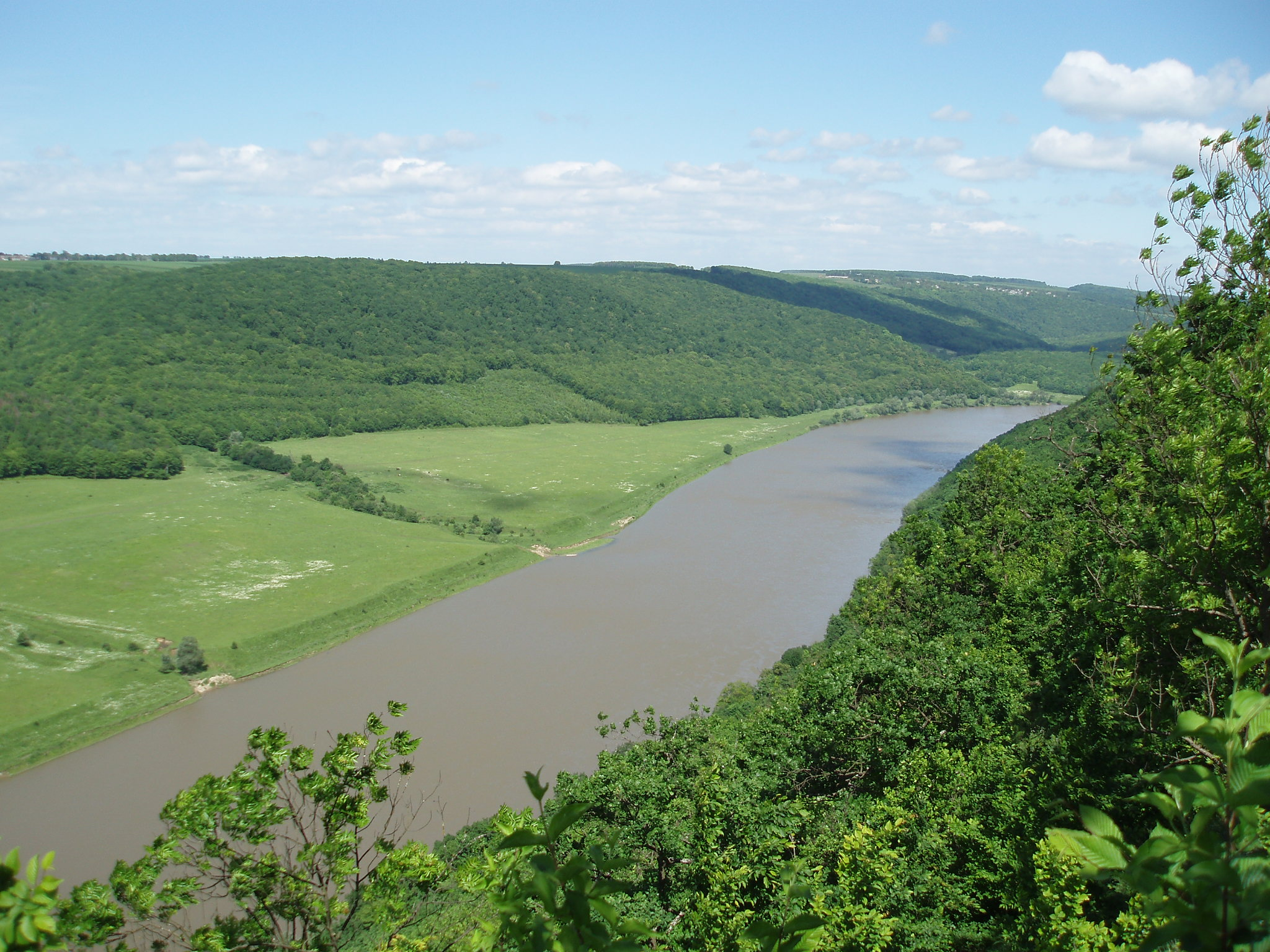
Dniester Canyon, close to the mouth of Strypa, Ternopil region.

=== Canyon segments ===
The Dniestrovo-Beremyanskyi Canyon situated between villages of Hubyn, Beremiany, and Khmeleva, is a branch of the larger Dniester Canyon. Its depth reaches 200 m (660 ft), is 1 to 5 km (0.62 to 3.11 mi) wide, and 10 km (6.2 mi) long.

== Geology ==
The Dniester Canyon cuts through layers of rock formed in the Lower Palaeozoic era, Upper Cretaceous period, and Miocene epoch. These deposits have eroded into exposed outcroppings. The canyon sits atop the basement of the Ukrainian Shield. Most of the bedrock is Devonian, but some walls consist of rock from the Ediacaran or Silurian periods.

Within the canyon there are more than ten karst caves and grottoes. Small waterfalls of so-called "maiden's tears" run along copse thick bryophyte rocks.

== Ecology ==
The high walls of the canyon retain heat and create a microclimate, causing average summer temperatures to by about 0.8 °C (33.4 °F) warmer than the surrounding area, and extending the season by about 10 days.

== Landscape ==
The most valuable and picturesque part of the whole Dniester is the 250 km-long (160 mi) stretch from the mouth of the river Zolota Lypa to the mouth of the river Zbruch. The nature of the Dniester Canyon is specific and original. These are first of all picturesque landscapes and their versatility which impart contribute to the originality of these routes. The steep rocky or wooden banks with the heights to 200 m (660 ft), unique travertine rocks and geological exfoliation, caves and grottoes with signs of human settlement upon them, waterfalls, picturesque islands, monuments of nature, history, architecture, ethnography – all these can be seen miles and miles.

== Preservation ==
The Dniester Canyon National Nature Park was established along the Dniester River course by Presidential Decree 2010 and Decree of the Minister of Environment and Natural Resources on December 12, 2011.

The steep canyon slopes were chosen as one of the Seven Natural Wonders of Ukraine.

== Tourism ==
The Dniester Canyon attracts thousands of water tourists each year.

Alloy on the Dniester River is one of the most interesting trips in Ukraine. Picturesque landscapes include steep rocky or forest banks of 200 m high, unique travertine rocks and geological removed layers, caves and grottoes, waterfalls, islands, monuments of nature, history, architecture, and ethnography.

=== Skydiving ===
The villages of Isakiv and Odaiv that are located at the canyon attract skydivers not only from Ukraine, but also from Belarus, Russia, Poland, Germany, and many other countries. Twice a year All-Ukrainian and International skydiving competition takes place here.
