= Sokilets, Ternopil Oblast =

Rural locality in Ternopil Oblast, Ukraine

Sokilets Сокілець
- Location in Ternopil Oblast
- Coordinates: 48°53′22″N 25°24′14″E
- Country: Ukraine
- Oblast: Ternopil Oblast
- Raion: Chortkiv Raion
- Hromada: Zolotyi Potik settlement hromada
- Time zone: UTC+2 (EET)
  - Summer (DST): UTC+3 (EEST)
- Postal code: 48465

Sokilets (Ukrainian: Сокілець) is a village in Zolotyi Potik settlement hromada, Chortkiv Raion, Ternopil Oblast, Ukraine.

== History ==
It was first mentioned in writings in 1463.

After the liquidation of the Buchach Raion on 19 July 2020, the village became part of the Chortkiv Raion.

== Religion ==
- Church of the Intercession (1635, wooden, built by monks, covered with tin in 1935, closed in 1946, in 1985-1989 the church was a museum). The church has an ancient Gospel (bought in 1631, as evidenced by the inscription on it; re-framed in 1850 and 1935).

== Sources ==
- (in Ukrainian) Гладун В., Свинко Й., Уніят В., Сокілець // Ternopil Encyclopedic Dictionary: in 4 v. / editorial board: H. Yavorskyi and other, Ternopil: "Zbruch", 2008, V. 3: П—Я, S. 307. — ISBN 978-966-528-279-2.
- "Sokulec, wś, pow. buczacki". Geographical Dictionary of the Kingdom of Poland (in Polish). 11. Warszawa: Kasa im. Józefa Mianowskiego. 1890. p. 40.
