= Skomorokhy, Chortkiv Raion, Ternopil Oblast =

Village in Ternopil Oblast, Ukraine

Skomorokhy Скоморохи
- Village
- Location in Ternopil Oblast
- Coordinates: 48°55′25″N 25°22′52″E
- Country: Ukraine
- Oblast: Ternopil Oblast
- Raion: Chortkiv
- Hromada: Zolotyi Potik
- First mentioned: 1439

Area
  - Total: 2.782 km^{2} (1.074 sq mi)
- Elevation: 337 m (1,106 ft)

Population (2001)
  - Total: 1,160
- Time zone: UTC+2 (EET)
  - Summer (DST): UTC+3 (EEST)
- Postal code: 48462
- Area code: +380 3544

Skomorokhy (Ukrainian: Скоморохи) is a village in Chortkiv Raion, Ternopil Oblast, Ukraine. It belongs to Zolotyi Potik settlement hromada, one of the hromadas of Ukraine.

== History ==
The first written mention of Skomorokhy was in 1439.

In 1599, after the division of the family estates with the brothers, the village became the property of the nobleman Stefan Pototcki. Potocki, together with his wife Maria, became the founders of the construction of the Church of St. Nicholas in Buchach. In the 19th century the owner of the estate in the village was Antoni Symforiusz Antoniewicz Bołoz, an active member of the Buchach-Chortkiv-Zalischytskyi branch of the Galician Economic Society (Galicyjskie Towarzystwo Gospodarskie) in Lviv.

In 1914, a one-class Ukrainian language full-time boys school opened in the village. In 1940, the construction of a hydroelectric power station on the Strypa river near the village began, which was completed after the Second World War. Electricity was supplied, in particular, to the then district center Zolotyi Potik.

Until 18 July 2020, Skomorokhy belonged to Buchach Raion. The raion was abolished in July 2020 as part of the administrative reform of Ukraine, which reduced the number of raions of Ternopil Oblast to three. The area of Buchach Raion was merged into Chortkiv Raion.
