= Mlynky, Ternopil Oblast =

Rural locality in Ternopil Oblast, Ukraine

Mlynky Млинки
- Location in Ternopil Oblast
- Coordinates: 48°55′31″N 25°17′0″E
- Country: Ukraine
- Oblast: Ternopil Oblast
- Raion: Chortkiv Raion
- Hromada: Zolotyi Potik settlement hromada
- Time zone: UTC+2 (EET)
  - Summer (DST): UTC+3 (EEST)
- Postal code: 48450

Mlynky (Ukrainian: Млинки) is a village in Zolotyi Potik settlement hromada, Chortkiv Raion, Ternopil Oblast, Ukraine.

== History ==
It is known from 1545.

After the liquidation of the Buchach Raion on 19 July 2020, the village became part of the Chortkiv Raion.

== Religion ==
- Church of the Descent of the Holy Spirit (2007, brick, UGCC).

== Sources ==
- (in Ukrainian) Свергун В., Млинки // Ternopil Encyclopedic Dictionary: in 4 v. / editorial board: H. Yavorskyi and other, Ternopil: "Zbruch", 2005, V. 2: К—О, S. 541. — ISBN 966-528-199-2.
