= Delev =

Delev (Bulgarian: Делев) is a Bulgarian masculine surname, its feminine counterpart is Deleva. Notable people with the surname include:

- Nikola Delev (1925–2004), Bulgarian cross-country skier
- Spas Delev (born 1989), Bulgarian footballer
- Vangel Delev (born 1946), Bulgarian footballer
