= Ivan Kyuchukov =

Bulgarian footballer

Personal information
- Full name: Ivan Strahilov Kyuchukov
- Date of birth: 1 February 1946 (age 80)
- Position: Midfielder

Senior career*
Years	Team	Apps	(Gls)
- Lokomotiv Plovdiv

Managerial career
- 1992: Karşıyaka
- 1995–1996: Levski Sofia
- 1996: Altay
- 2002–2003: Marek Dupnitsa
- * Club domestic league appearances and goals

Ivan Strahilov Kyuchukov (born 1 February 1946) is a Bulgarian football midfielder and later manager.
