= Budzyń =

Budzyń or Budzyn may refer to:

== Places in Poland ==
=== Lesser Poland Voivodeship ===
- Budzyń, Kraków County
- Budzyń, Olkusz County

=== Lublin Voivodeship ===
- Budzyń, Biłgoraj County
- Budzyń, Gmina Chodel in Opole County
- Budzyń (Kraśnik), a district of Kraśnik in Kraśnik County
  - Budzyń concentration camp, Kraśnik, Nazi-operated 1942-1944

=== Other voivodeships ===
- Gmina Budzyń in Chodzież County, Greater Poland Voivodeship
  - Budzyń, Greater Poland Voivodeship, seat of the gmina
- Budzyń, Łódź Voivodeship (central Poland)
- Budzyń, Podkarpackie Voivodeship (south-east Poland)
- Budzyń, Świętokrzyskie Voivodeship (south-central Poland)

== People ==
- Krzysztof Budzyń, Polish historian
- Tucker Budzyn (2018–2026), American golden retriever known for social media content
- Walter Budzyn, one of the two Detroit police officers who killed Malice Green in 1992
