= Sokoliv, Chortkiv Raion, Ternopil Oblast =

Rural locality in Ternopil Oblast, Ukraine

Sokoliv Соколів
- Location in Ternopil Oblast
- Coordinates: 48°56′2″N 25°20′42″E
- Country: Ukraine
- Oblast: Ternopil Oblast
- Raion: Chortkiv Raion
- Hromada: Zolotyi Potik settlement hromada
- Time zone: UTC+2 (EET)
  - Summer (DST): UTC+3 (EEST)
- Postal code: 48444

Sokoliv (Ukrainian: Соколів) is a village in Zolotyi Potik settlement hromada, Chortkiv Raion, Ternopil Oblast, Ukraine.

== History ==
It was first mentioned in writings in 1436.

After the liquidation of the Buchach Raion on 19 July 2020, the village became part of the Chortkiv Raion.

== Religion ==
- Church of the Assumption (1846, OCU),
- Saint Nicholas Church (1993, brick, UGCC).

== Sources ==
- (in Ukrainian) Мацькевич В., Уніят В., Соколів // Ternopil Encyclopedic Dictionary: in 4 v. / editorial board: H. Yavorskyi and other, Ternopil: "Zbruch", 2008, V. 3: П—Я, S. 307—308. — ISBN 978-966-528-279-2.
- "Sokołów (4)". Geographical Dictionary of the Kingdom of Poland (in Polish). 11. Warszawa: Kasa im. Józefa Mianowskiego. 1890. p. 32—33.
