= Vozyliv =

Vozyliv Вози́лів
- Location within Ternopil Oblast Location within Ukraine
- Coordinates: 48°51′19″N 25°18′41″E
- Country: Ukraine
- Oblast: Ternopil Oblast
- Raion: Chortkiv Raion
- Hromada: Zolotyi Potik settlement hromada

Population (2001 census)
  - Total: 1,216
- Time zone: UTC+2 (EET)
  - Summer (DST): UTC+3 (EEST)
- Postal code: 48454
- Area code: +380 3544

Vozyliv (Ukrainian: Вози́лів; Polish: Woziłów) is a Ukrainian village in the Zolotyi Potik settlement hromada in the Chortkiv Raion of the Ternopil Oblast. It is located on the Dniester River.

Vozyliv consists of two parts: Dolishnyi Vozyliv (below the Dniester), and Horishnyi Vozyliv (to the north of the river).

In accordance with the Cabinet of Ministers of Ukraine, the village became part of the Zolotyi Potik settlement hromada.

== Etymology ==
The origin of the name "Vozyliv" comes from the Ukrainian word vozyty (возити), meaning to carry, referring to the current going up the Dniester River.

== Archaeological discoveries ==
Bronze tools from the Early Bronze Age (3,000 BC), a settlement, and a burial ground from the turn of the 1st Century AD were found near the village. In 1947, a cemetery was dug up on the border of Verkhnii and Nyzhnii Vozyliv. Geological exploration concluded that the site was over 6,000 years old. The burials were covered with large stone slabs. Stone Age tools were found in the Kirnychky tract, and bronze tools (from the 3rd Century BC) are sometimes uncovered throughout the village.

== History ==
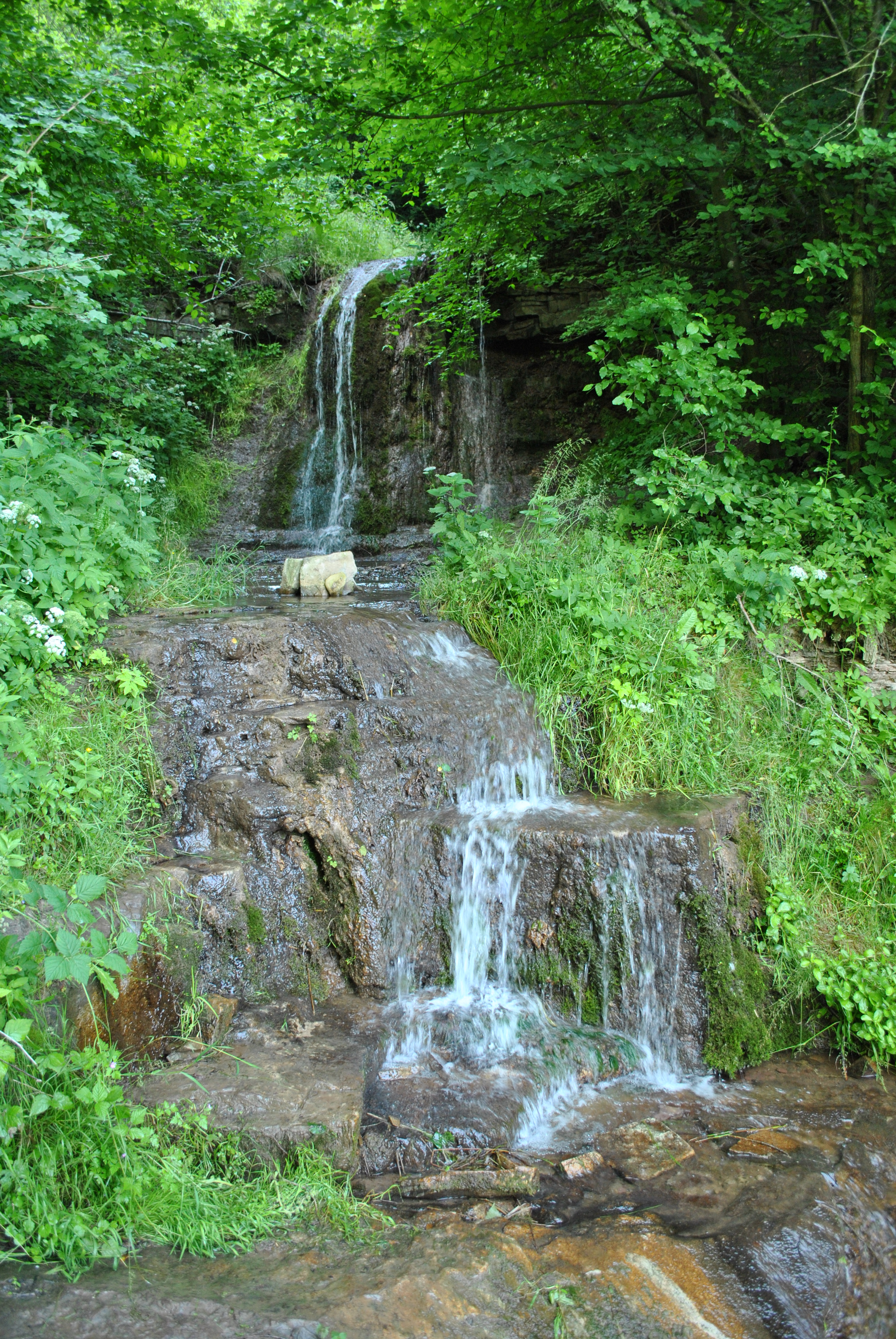
Waterfall of the Dniester in Vozyliv, a natural heritage site in Ukraine

The first written mention of the village dates back to 1410. Another documentation of the village dates back to 1454; the village belonged to the nobleman Teodorik Buchatskyi-Yazlovetskyi, Teodorik of Buchach.^{[uk]}

On July 17, 1458, the record of the Galician Zemstvo Court (No. 2876) indicates that Michal of Buchach and Yazlivets. the son of Teodorik Buchatskyj-Yazlovetskyj, promised the village of Vozyliv to nobleman Jan of Nyenczyn for a loan of 60 marks.

"Lat. Gen. Michael de Buczcacz, otherwise known as Jaslovecz, pledged the said goods of Wosilow to the noble John of Nyenczyn for 60 marks, so that John would have the ability to occupy Wosilow under the terms he wished for the said price. Michael was obliged to protect him from his brother John."

Polish nobleman Tomasz from Trzemeszno, a member of the Strzemeski family of Lubusz, who held estates in the Ravda Voivodeship, moved to the Rus' Voivodeship, where he settled in 1460. He bought the feudal rights to the villages of Voslilov and Snovydy. His descendant, Kryzysztof Strzemeski, sold the two estates to the Potocki family of Pyliawa as adjacent to the town of Zolotyi Potik.

In 1848, a distillery was built in the center of Verkhnii Vozyliv. In 1918, it was burned down from a fire on the roof. In 1947, it was rebuilt following the World Wars. The first floor of the building later became a club, and was converted to a shop. Eventually, a third floor was added and was converted into a mill.

Since 1914, the Prosvita society has been operating in Vozyliv. Until 1939, the village had a consumer cooperative, the "Meadow" society.^{[uk]}

In 1935, a large fire occurred in the village, engulfing Horynka and Chereshni street. In 1941 and 1947, major floors, presumably from the river, damaged buildings in the town.

During World War II, almost all young men were drafted into the ranks of the Galicia Division of the Soviet Army.

== Demographics ==
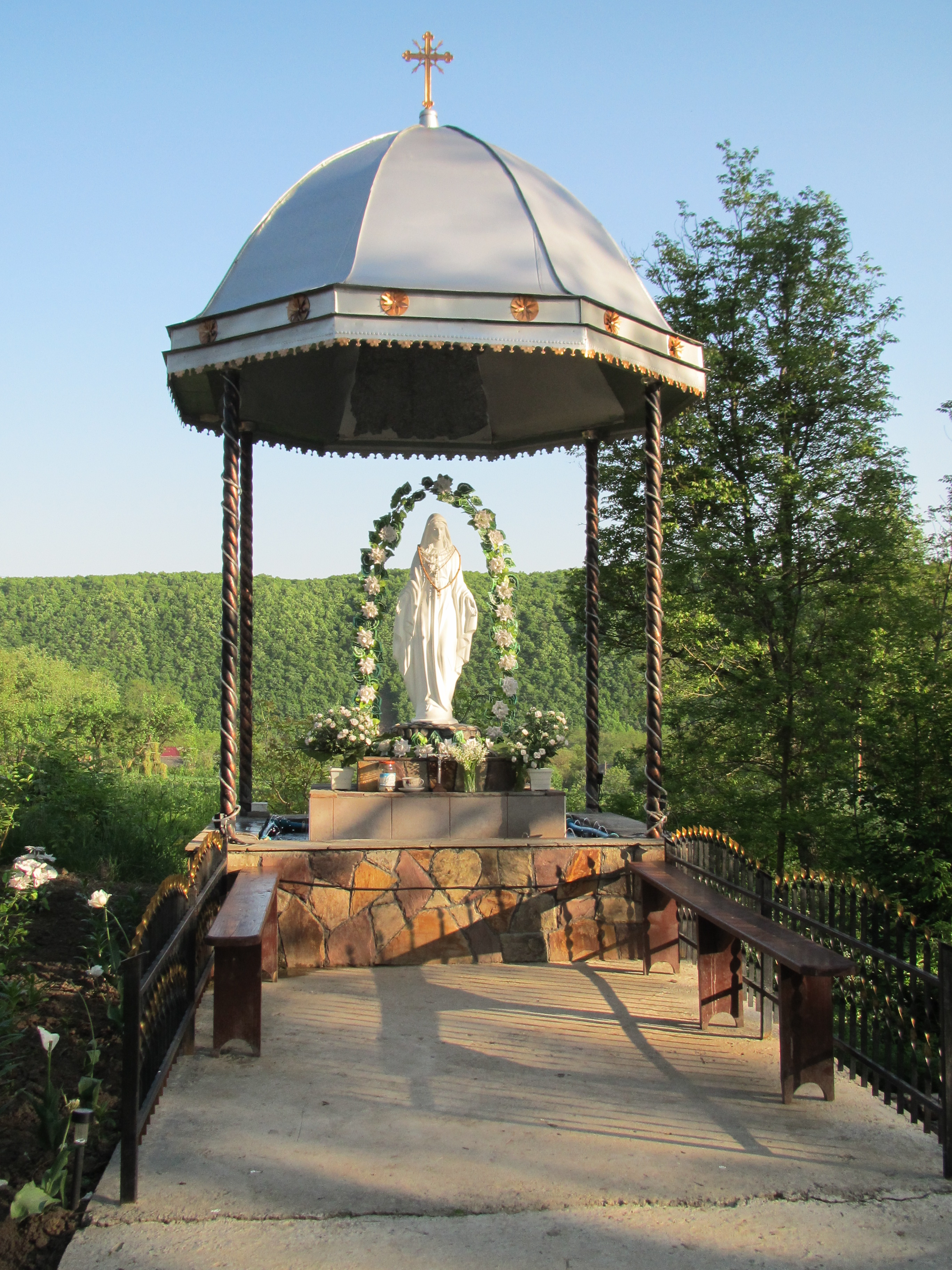
Chapel at Vozyliv

According to the 2001 census of Ukraine, the population of Vozyliv is 1,216 people.

Population of Vozilov in the past:

- 1741 – 416 Ukrainians
- 1880 – 471 (95%) Ukrainians, 22 (4.7%) Jews, 2 (0.3%) others
- 1900 – 613 (92.9%) Ukrainians, 33 (5%) Poles, 14 (2.1%) Jews
- 1912 – 700 (97.6%) Ukrainians, 4 (0.6%) Poles, 13 (1.8%) Jews
- 1939 – 880 (98.8%) Ukrainians, 10 (1.2%) Poles
- 2022 – 1,216 (majority Ukrainians, minority of Russians)

== Church ==
Vozyliv is home to the Church of the Assumption of the Blessed Virgin Mary^{[uk]}. The church was built in 1557, and was rebuilt in 1942. The church was burned in 1945, and was built upon the foundation of the old church, opening on August 28, 1991.
