= Snovydiv =

Rural locality in Ternopil Oblast, Ukraine

Snovydiv Сновидів
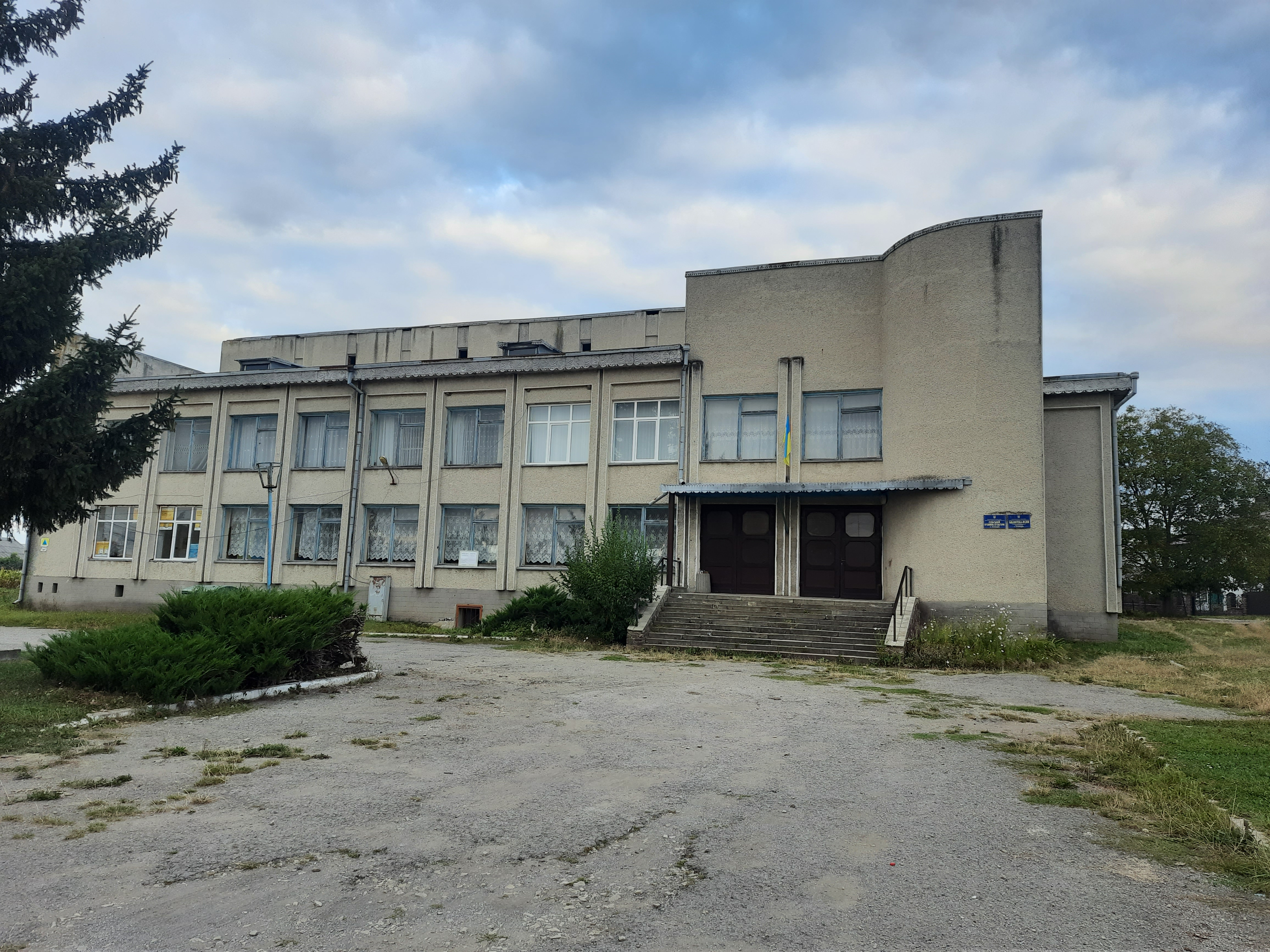

- Location in Ternopil Oblast
- Coordinates: 48°52′48″N 25°17′9″E
- Country: Ukraine
- Oblast: Ternopil Oblast
- Raion: Chortkiv Raion
- Hromada: Zolotyi Potik settlement hromada
- Time zone: UTC+2 (EET)
  - Summer (DST): UTC+3 (EEST)
- Postal code: 48455

Snovydiv (Ukrainian: Сновидів) is a village in Zolotyi Potik settlement hromada, Chortkiv Raion, Ternopil Oblast, Ukraine.

== History ==
It was first mentioned in writings in 1437.

After the liquidation of the Buchach Raion on 19 July 2020, the village became part of the Chortkiv Raion.

== Religion ==
- Church of the Intercession (1997, brick).

== Sources ==
- (in Ukrainian) Лисик М., Уніят В., Яворський Г., Сновидів // Ternopil Encyclopedic Dictionary: in 4 v. / editorial board: H. Yavorskyi and other, Ternopil: "Zbruch", 2008, V. 3: П—Я, S. 304. — ISBN 978-966-528-279-2.
- "Snowidów". Geographical Dictionary of the Kingdom of Poland (in Polish). 10. Warszawa: Kasa im. Józefa Mianowskiego. 1889. p. 938.
