= Hubyn =

Hubyn Губин
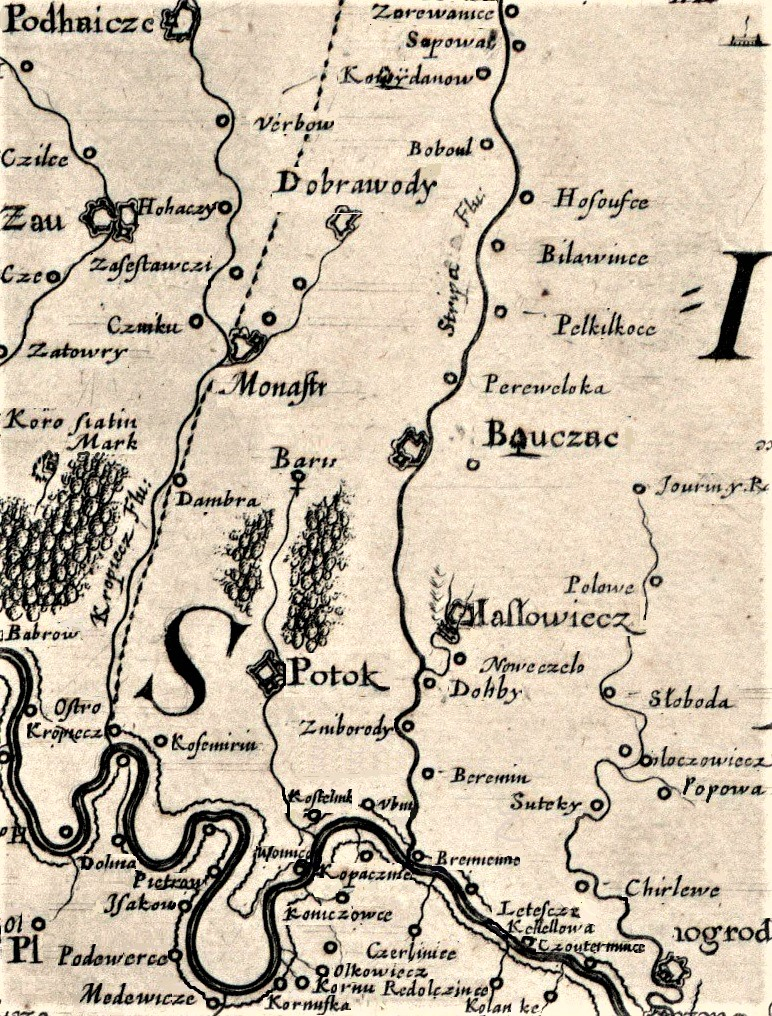
- Map of Dniester River area, 1650

- Location within Ternopil Oblast Location within Ukraine
- Coordinates: 48°50′50″N 25°25′19″E
- Country: Ukraine
- Oblast: Ternopil Oblast
- Raion: Chortkiv Raion
- Hromada: Zolotyi Potik settlement hromada

Area
  - Total: 4.27 km^{2} (1.65 sq mi)

Population (2001 census)
  - Total: 140
  - Density: 32.8/km^{2} (85/sq mi)
- Time zone: UTC+2 (EET)
  - Summer (DST): UTC+3 (EEST)
- Postal code: 48466
- Area code: +380 3544

Hubyn (Ukrainian: Губин) is a Ukrainian village in Zolotyi Potik settlement hromada, Chortkiv Raion, Ternopil Oblast. It is located on the Dniester River. Since September 2015, it has been a part of Zolotyi Potik hromada.

In accordance with the Cabinet of Ministers of Ukraine, the village became part of Zolotyi Potik settlement hromada.

== History ==
Near Hubyn, archaeological sites of the Upper Paleoolithic, spherical amphorae, and ancient Rus' artifacts were discovered. An ancient Rus' settlement was found on the banks of the Dniester. The first written mention of the city was in 1560.

In the 1930s, the population of Hubyn exceeded 1,200 people. Ukrainians consisted 80% of the population, Jews consisted another 15%, and another 5% were made up of various other ethnic groups such as Russians and Poles. After World War II, the population fell to 450 people. Many residents died from conflict between the USSR and Nazi Germany. In modern times, around 150 people live in the village.

In 1990, the Ternopil Oblast Council restored Hubyn's status as an official village, separating it from the full jurisdiction of the Buchach Raion.

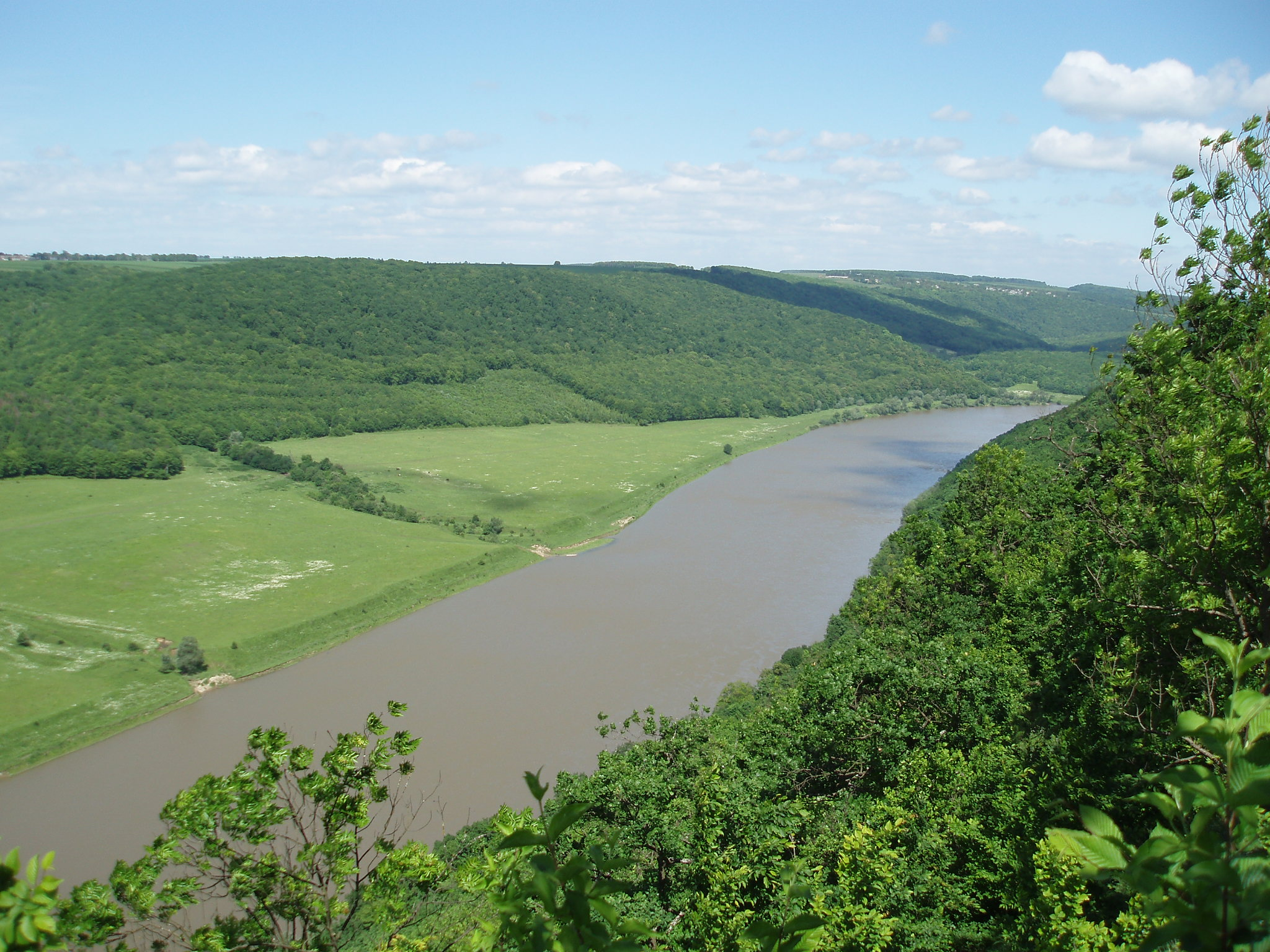
View of the Dniester River from the right bank

== Geography and ecology ==
The village is located on the left bank of the Dniester.

In November 2018, the Department of the State Agency of Fisheries in Ternopil banned fishing in the region during the winter season to give time for the local population to replenish to avoid overconsumption.

== Church ==
The Church of the Truncation of the Head of St. John the Baptism (Hubyn) is the local parish in Hubyn. It was built on the site of an older wooden church, which burned down in 1835. The church was consecrated in 1863. The building is also wooden, and was built with spruce logs on top of oak foundations.

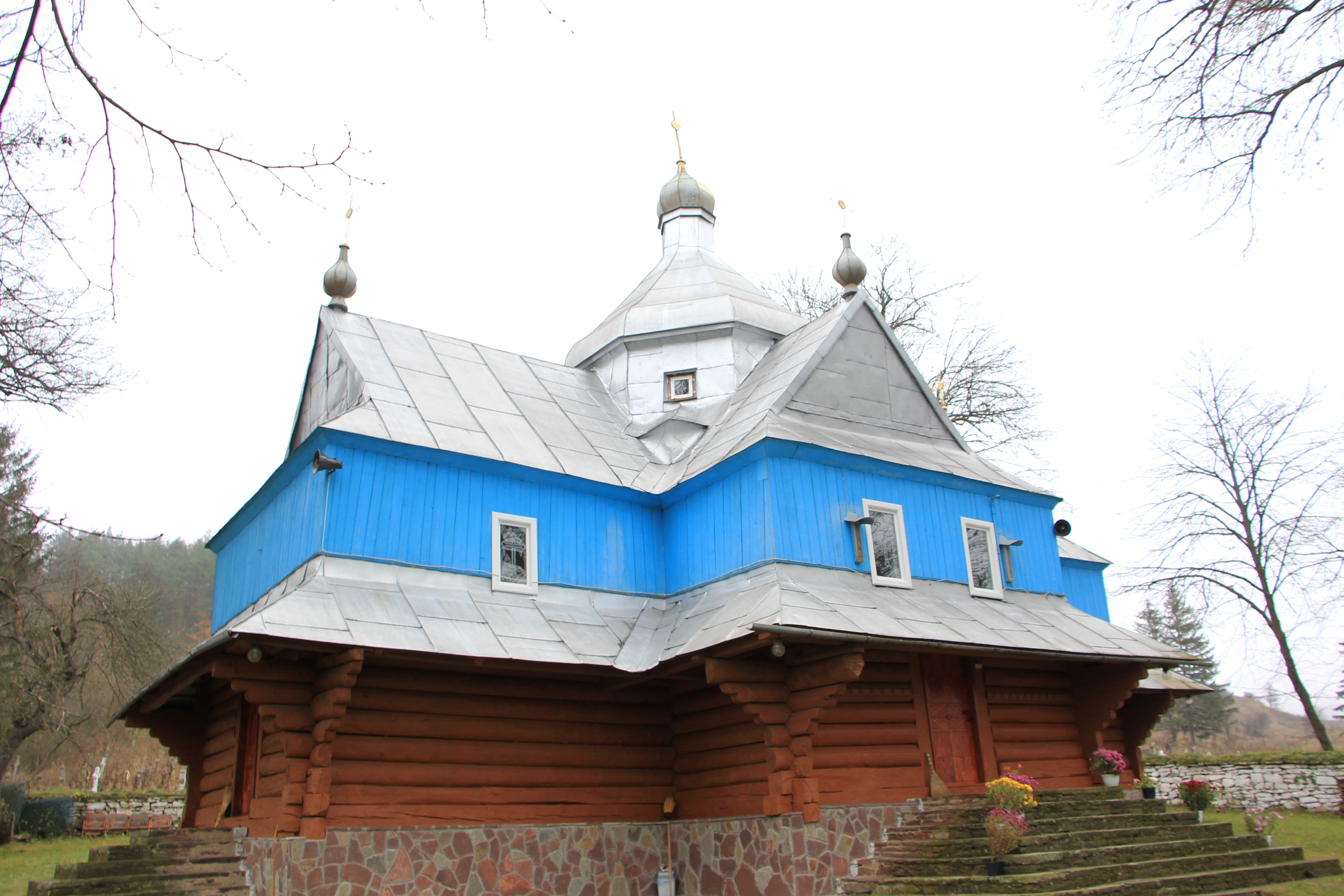
The Church of the Trunucation of the Head of John The Baptist
