= Stinka, Ternopil Oblast =

Rural locality in Ternopil Oblast, Ukraine

Stinka Стінка
- Location in Ternopil Oblast
- Coordinates: 48°55′15″N 25°14′57″E
- Country: Ukraine
- Oblast: Ternopil Oblast
- Raion: Chortkiv Raion
- Hromada: Zolotyi Potik settlement hromada
- Time zone: UTC+2 (EET)
  - Summer (DST): UTC+3 (EEST)
- Postal code: 48450

Stinka (Ukrainian: Стінка) is a village in Zolotyi Potik settlement hromada, Chortkiv Raion, Ternopil Oblast, Ukraine.

== History ==
It was first mentioned in writings in 1453.

After the liquidation of the Buchach Raion on 19 July 2020, the village became part of the Chortkiv Raion.

== Religion ==
- Two churches of the Nativity of the Blessed Virgin Mary (1921, brick, OCU; 2000, brick, UGCC).

== Sources ==
- (in Ukrainian) Гринчишин Н., Стінка // Ternopil Encyclopedic Dictionary: in 4 v. / editorial board: H. Yavorskyi and other, Ternopil: "Zbruch", 2008, V. 3: П—Я, S. 355—356. — ISBN 978-966-528-279-2.
- "Ścianka 9.) S., wś. pow. buczacki". Geographical Dictionary of the Kingdom of Poland (in Polish). 10. Warszawa: Kasa im. Józefa Mianowskiego. 1889. p. 405.
