= Vangel Delev =

Bulgarian footballer

Personal information
- Date of birth: 12 March 1946 (age 80)
- Position: Midfielder

Senior career*
Years	Team	Apps	(Gls)
1965–1978	Botev Plovdiv		

International career
1977	Bulgaria	1	(0)
- * Club domestic league appearances and goals

Vangel Delev (Bulgarian: Вангел Делев, born 12 March 1946) is a retired Bulgarian football midfielder.
