= Kosmyryn =

Kosmyryn Космирин
- Interactive map of Kosmyryn
- Coordinates: 48°52′58″N 25°14′42″E
- Country: Ukraine
- Oblast: Ternopil Oblast
- Raion: Chortkiv Raion
- Hromada: Zolotyi Potik settlement hromada

Area
  - Total: 2.495 km^{2} (0.963 sq mi)

Population (2001 census)
  - Total: 948
  - Density: 379.96/km^{2} (984.1/sq mi)
- Time zone: UTC+2 (EET)
  - Summer (DST): UTC+3 (EEST)
- Postal code: 48454
- Area code: +380 3544

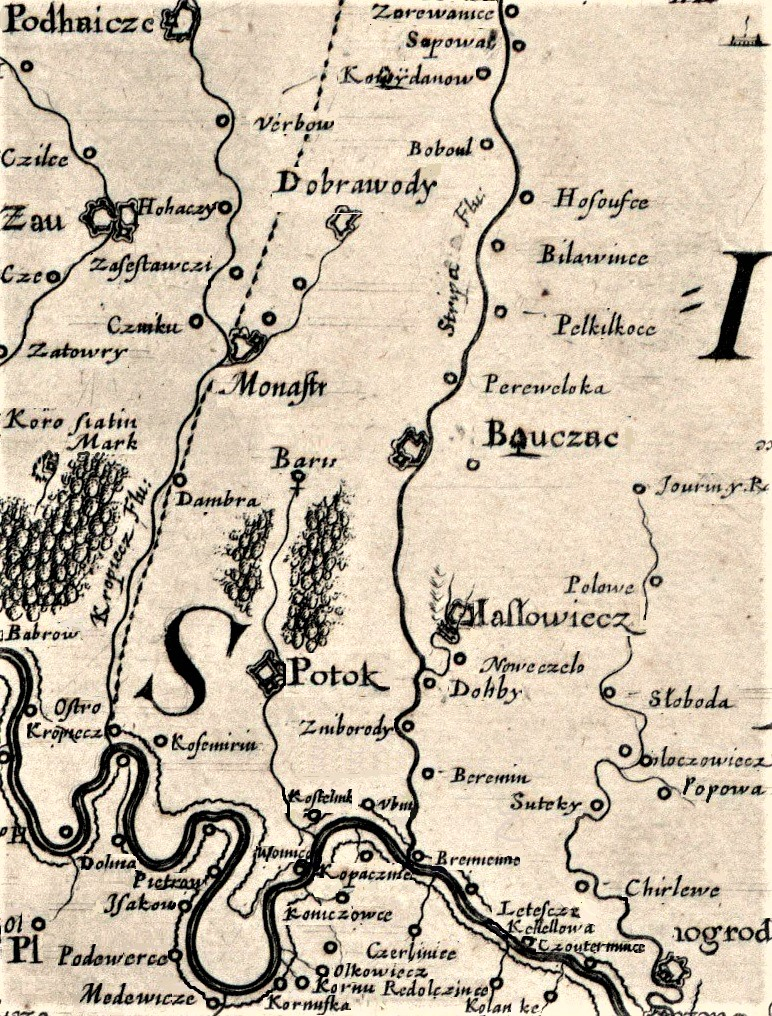
Fragment of the Special Map of Ukraine by Guillaume Levasseur de Beauplan, 1650. Buchachchina.

Kosmyryn (Ukrainian: Космирин) is a village in Chortkiv Raion (district) of Ternopil Oblast (province) in western Ukraine. It belongs to Zolotyi Potik settlement hromada, one of the hromadas of Ukraine. The Dniester River flows near the edge of the village.

== History ==
First written mention comes from the 15th century (on January 1, 1457). Then Rukomysh belonged to the Kingdom of Poland, from 1569 to the Polish–Lithuanian Commonwealth. from 1772 until 1918 to Austrian empires, in 1918-1919 to West Ukrainian People's Republic. The first known owner of village was Polish nobleman Stanislav of Khodorostav (now Khodoriv, Lviv Oblast), who was connected by marriage was due to the representatives of the House of Buczacki.

Reading room of Ukrainian society Prosvita operated in the village.

Until 18 July 2020, Kosmyryn belonged to Buchach Raion. The raion was abolished in July 2020 as part of the administrative reform of Ukraine, which reduced the number of raions of Ternopil Oblast to three. The area of Buchach Raion was merged into Chortkiv Raion.

== Attractions ==
- Church of St. Archangel Michael (1886, wood, reconstructed 1989)
- Chapel

== Sources ==
- (in Ukrainian) І. Гальчук, В. Уніят, Космирин // Ternopil Encyclopedic Dictionary: in 4 v. / editorial board: H. Yavorskyi and other, Ternopil: "Zbruch", 2005, V. 2: К—О, S. 191. — ISBN 966-528-199-2.
- "Kośmierzyn, wś, pow. buczacki". Geographical Dictionary of the Kingdom of Poland (in Polish). 4. Warszawa: Kasa im. Józefa Mianowskiego. 1883. p. 465.

.— P. 465.
