= 15th Tank Division (Soviet Union) =

- Active: June 22 1940 - August 14 1941
- Disbanded: August 14 1941
- Country: Soviet Union
- Branch: Army
- Type: Heavy-motorized
- Garrison/HQ: Ivano-Frankivsk, Ukrainian SSR
- Engagements: WW2; Battle of Uman

The 15th Tank Division was an armored formation of the Red Army that fought on the eastern front of World War II.

== History ==
The 15th Tank Division was formed during the summer of 1940 as part of the 8th Mechanized Corps. It was created on the basis of the 14th Heavy Tank Brigade, as well as the 512th Rifle Regiment, the 486th Artillery Regiment, the 443rd Tank Battalion of the 146th Rifle Division, and the tank regiment and anti-aircraft artillery battalion of the 16th Cavalry Division.

At the start of the war, the division headquarters and the 30th Tank Regiment were stationed in Stanislav (now Ivano-Frankivsk), the 15th Motorized Regiment at Nadvirna, and the 15th Howitzer Artillery Regiment at Kalush.

On 22 June 1941, the division, together with the 16th Mechanized Corps, became part of the 12th Army of the Southwestern Front. At 9:00 a.m., the division departed Stanislav for the area of Toporivtsi, Boyany, and Kitsman. By the morning of 23 June, it had completed its concentration in the assigned area, with division headquarters established at Kuchurmyk.

On 25 June, the 16th Mechanized Corps was transferred to the newly formed 18th Army.

Although it had not yet fought, the 15th Tank Division marched approximately 300 kilometers from its garrisons around Stanislav to the loading stations at Derazhnia, suffering significant equipment losses due to mechanical breakdowns. It reached Derazhnia only by the morning of 7 July 1941, and because of a shortage of railway rolling stock, loading continued until 11 July.

On 8 July, the enemy, using a single tank division, broke through to Berdychiv and captured the city. The commander of the 16th Mechanized Corps, General Sokolov, was ordered to take command of all forces in the area and eliminate the breakthrough.

During the fighting, Soviet troops suffered heavy losses. By the morning of 10 July, the reconnaissance battalion of the 15th Tank Division, together with part of its artillery, arrived in the combat area. One of the division's tank regiments unloaded at Kalynivka, approximately 45 kilometers from the battlefield.

On 11 July, the regiment entered combat on the Markushi–Khazhin sector, reinforcing the exhausted 87th Tank Regiment of the 44th Tank Division. Together they advanced toward Bystryk and reached the southwestern outskirts of Berdychiv, but were unable to continue their advance.

On 12 July, Soviet command withdrew the 15th Tank Division from the Berdychiv area because the enemy, having captured Raigorodok, threatened the flank and rear of the Soviet forces attacking the city.

On 13 July, the main forces of Sokolov's Group were forced back from the line Velyki Nyzhhurtsi – Ivankivtsi – Khazhin. On 15 July, they abandoned the Bilopillia – Hlukhivtsi – Komsomolske line. By the end of the same day, the group had withdrawn from Koziatyn.

The Wehrmacht breakthrough toward Koziatyn threatened the rear of the main forces of the Southwestern Front. The breakthrough split Sokolov's Group into two parts. Near Komsomolske, the 15th Tank Division became encircled but successfully broke through during the night.

To preserve their combat effectiveness, the units of the 16th Mechanized Corps, together with attached formations, began withdrawing toward Ruzhyn and Zarudyntsi. Near Ruzhyn, the commander of the 30th Tank Regiment, Colonel A. Nikitin, was killed. During the fighting, the corps suffered heavy losses in equipment and experienced severe shortages of fuel and ammunition. As of 15 July 1941, the 15th Tank Division had 87 tanks, 35 artillery pieces, and 162 motor vehicles remaining.

By the end of 24 July, the 16th Mechanized Corps had withdrawn to the defensive line running from Skala to Kozhanka. From the remnants of the 240th Motorized Division and the 15th and 44th Tank Divisions, an infantry detachment approximately battalion-sized was formed.

On 14 August 1941, the division was officially disbanded.

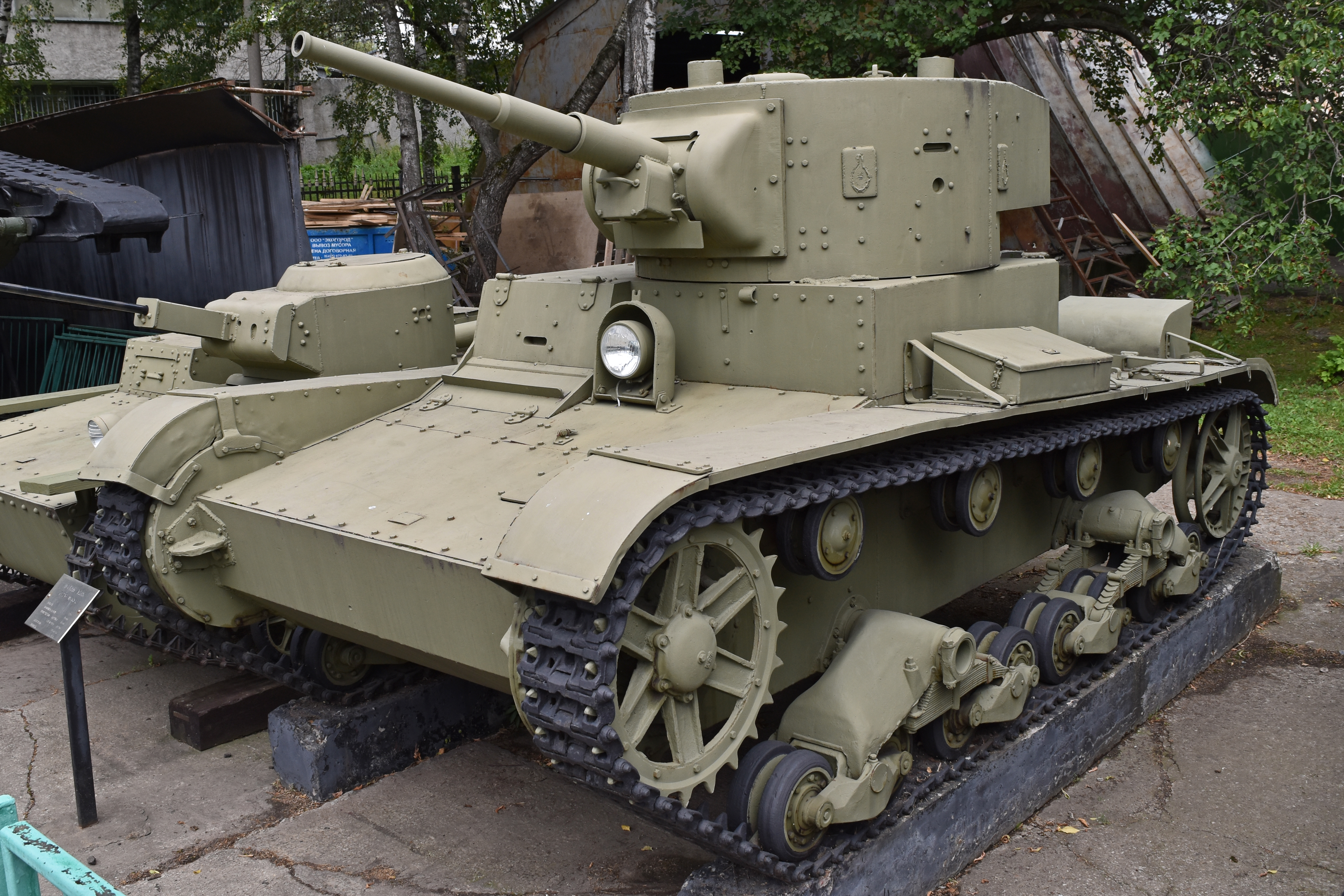
The T-26 tank used by the Division

== Fleet ==
- T-28: 77
- T-26: 31
- BA-10: 22
- BА-20: 19

== Composition ==
- 29th Tank Regiment
- 30th Tank Regiment
- 15th Motorized Rifle Regiment
- 15th Howitzer Artillery Regiment
- 15th Separate Anti-Aircraft Artillery Division
- 15th Reconnaissance Battalion
- 15th Pontoon Battalion
- 15th Separate Communications Battalion
- 15th Repair and Recovery Battalion
- 15th Medical Battalion
- 15th Motor Transport Battalion
- 15th Field Bakery
- 278th Field Post Station
- 303rd Field cash office of the State Bank

== Commanders ==
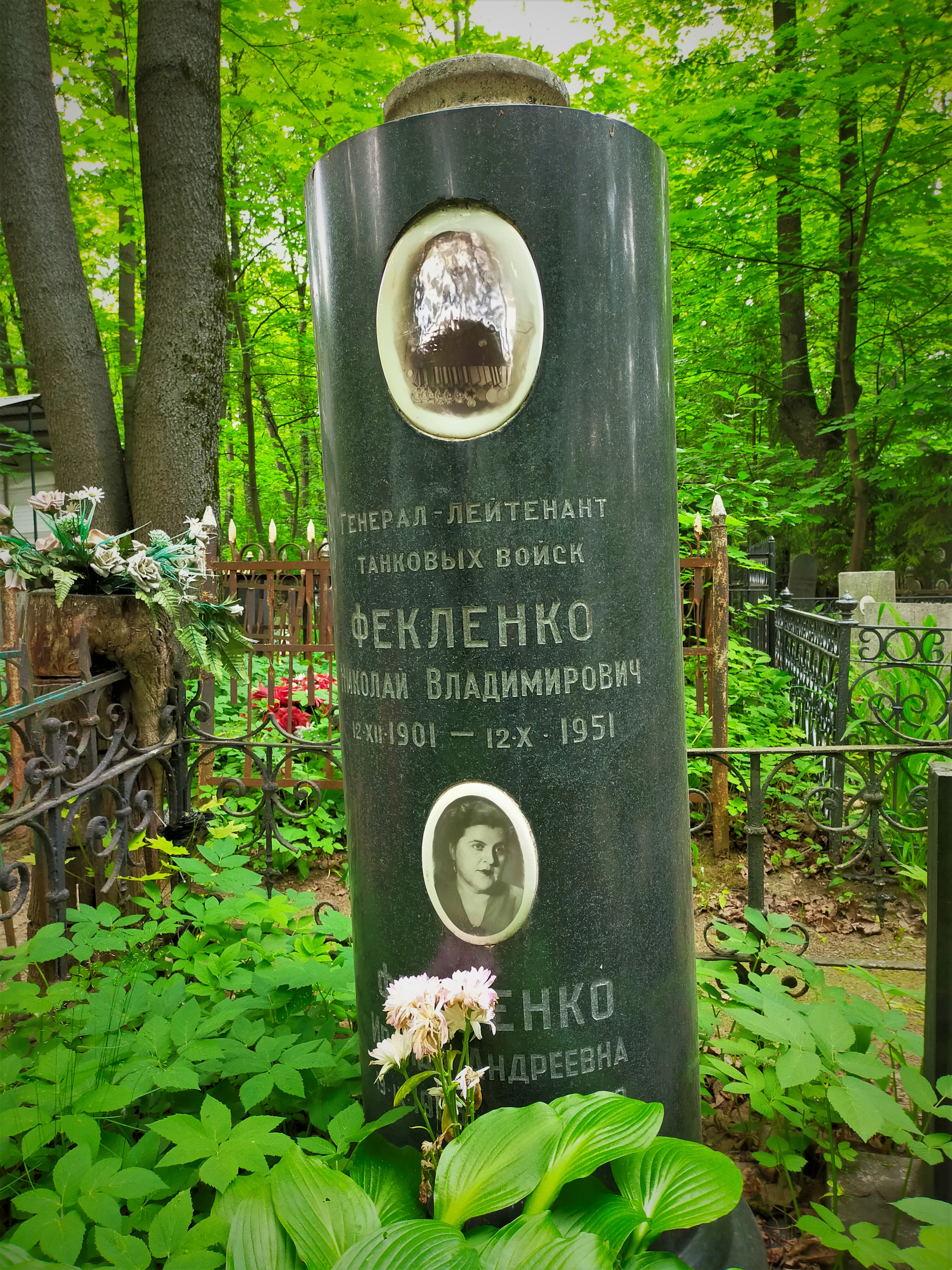
Tomb of Lieutenant General Nikolai Vladimirovich Feklenko

Commanders

- Timofey Andreevich Mishanin (4 June 1940 — 19 July 1940), Major General
- Nikolai Vladimirovich Feklenko (19 July 1940 — 11 March 1941), Major General
- Vasily Iudovich Polozkov (11 March 1941 — 14 August 1941), Colonel

Deputy commanders of the division

- Andrey Mikhailovich Pavlov (15 July 1940 — 4 October 1940), Colonel
