= Zhnyborody =

Zhnyborody Жнибороди Żnibrody
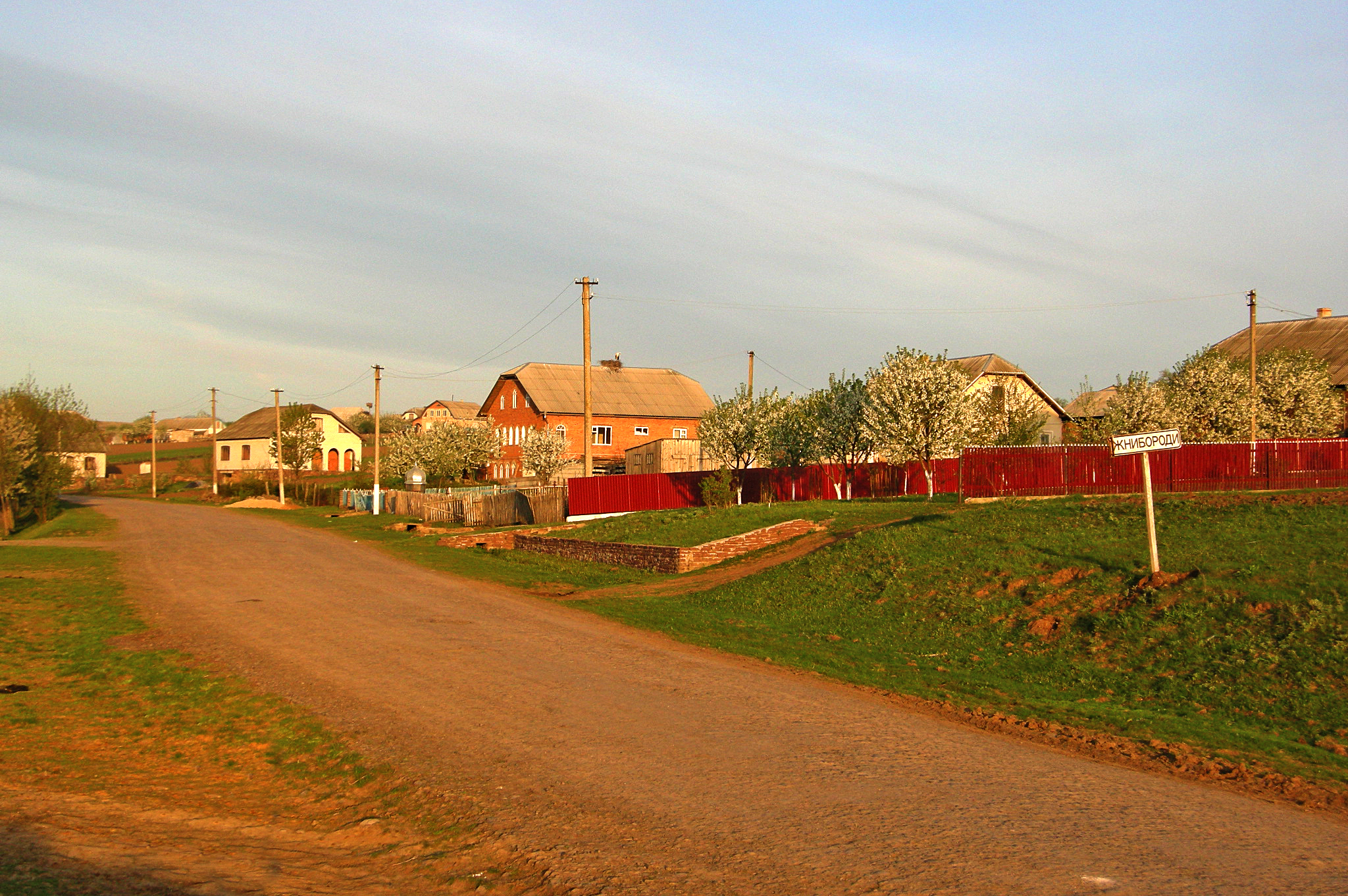

- Location within Ukraine Location within Ternopil Oblast
- Coordinates: 48°54′01″N 25°26′24″E
- Country: Ukraine
- Oblast: Ternopil Oblast
- Raion: Chortkiv Raion

Area
  - Total: 0.920 km^{2} (0.355 sq mi)

Population (2001 census)
  - Total: 721
  - Density: 1,315/km^{2} (3,410/sq mi)
- Time zone: UTC+2 (EET)
  - Summer (DST): UTC+3 (EEST)
- Postal code: 48474
- Area code: +380 3544
- Website: zhnyborody.te.ua

Zhnyborody (Ukrainian: Жнибороди; Polish: Żnibrody; Russian: Жнибороды) is a village in Chortkiv Raion (district) of Ternopil Oblast (province) in western Ukraine. It belongs to Buchach urban hromada, one of the hromadas of Ukraine.

== History ==
First written mention comes from the 15th century, naming Niezbrody. Zhnyborody belonged to the Kingdom of Poland, the Polish–Lithuanian Commonwealth, from 1772 until 1918 to Austrian (Habsburg monarchy, Austrian Empire, Austria-Hungary) empires, in 1918-1919 to West Ukrainian People's Republic. From 1991 it belonged to Ukraine.

Until 18 July 2020, Zhnyborody belonged to Buchach Raion. The raion was abolished in July 2020 as part of the administrative reform of Ukraine, which reduced the number of raions of Ternopil Oblast to three. The area of Buchach Raion was merged into Chortkiv Raion.

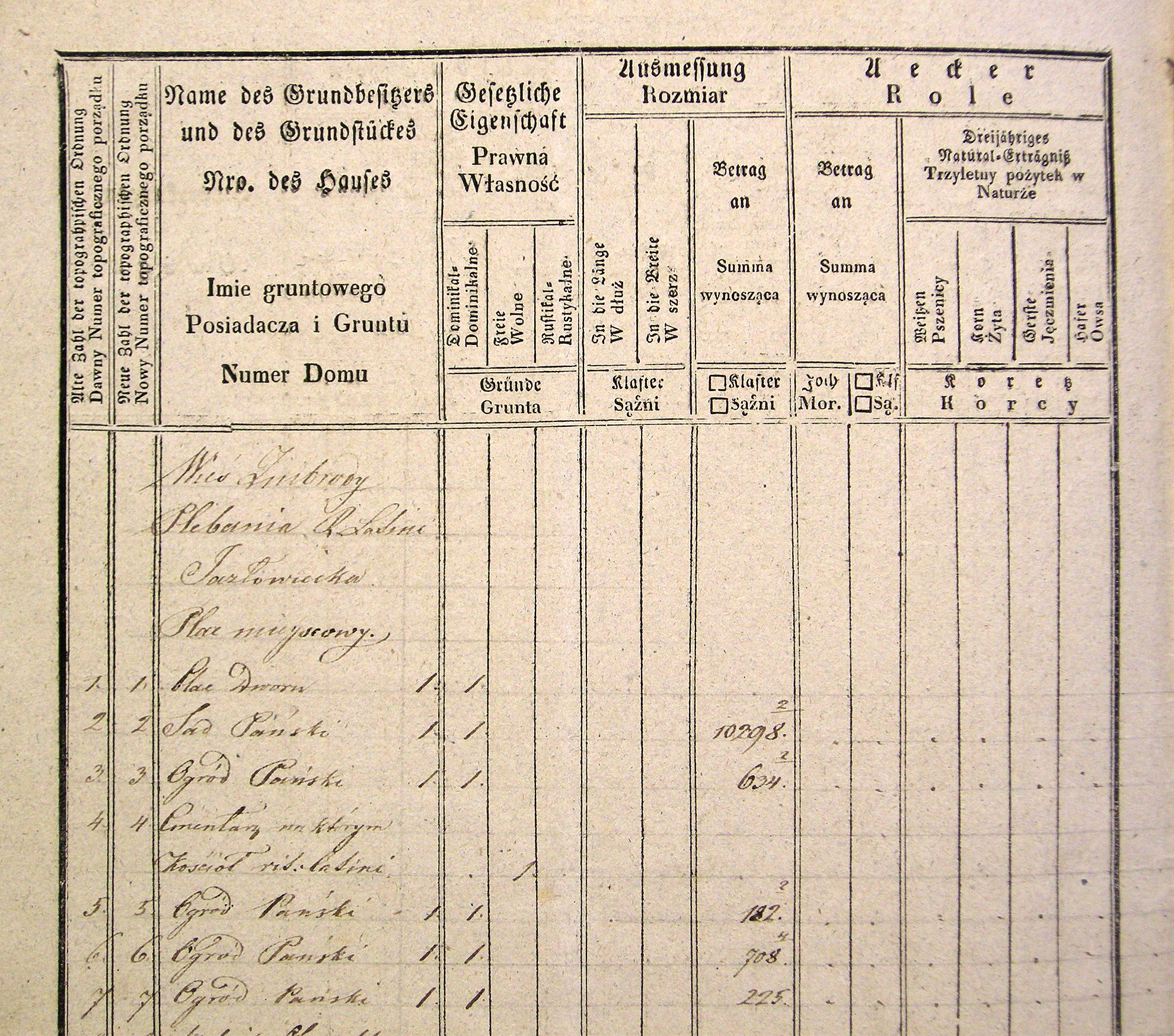
Fragment Franciscan birth-certificate w. Zhnyborody.

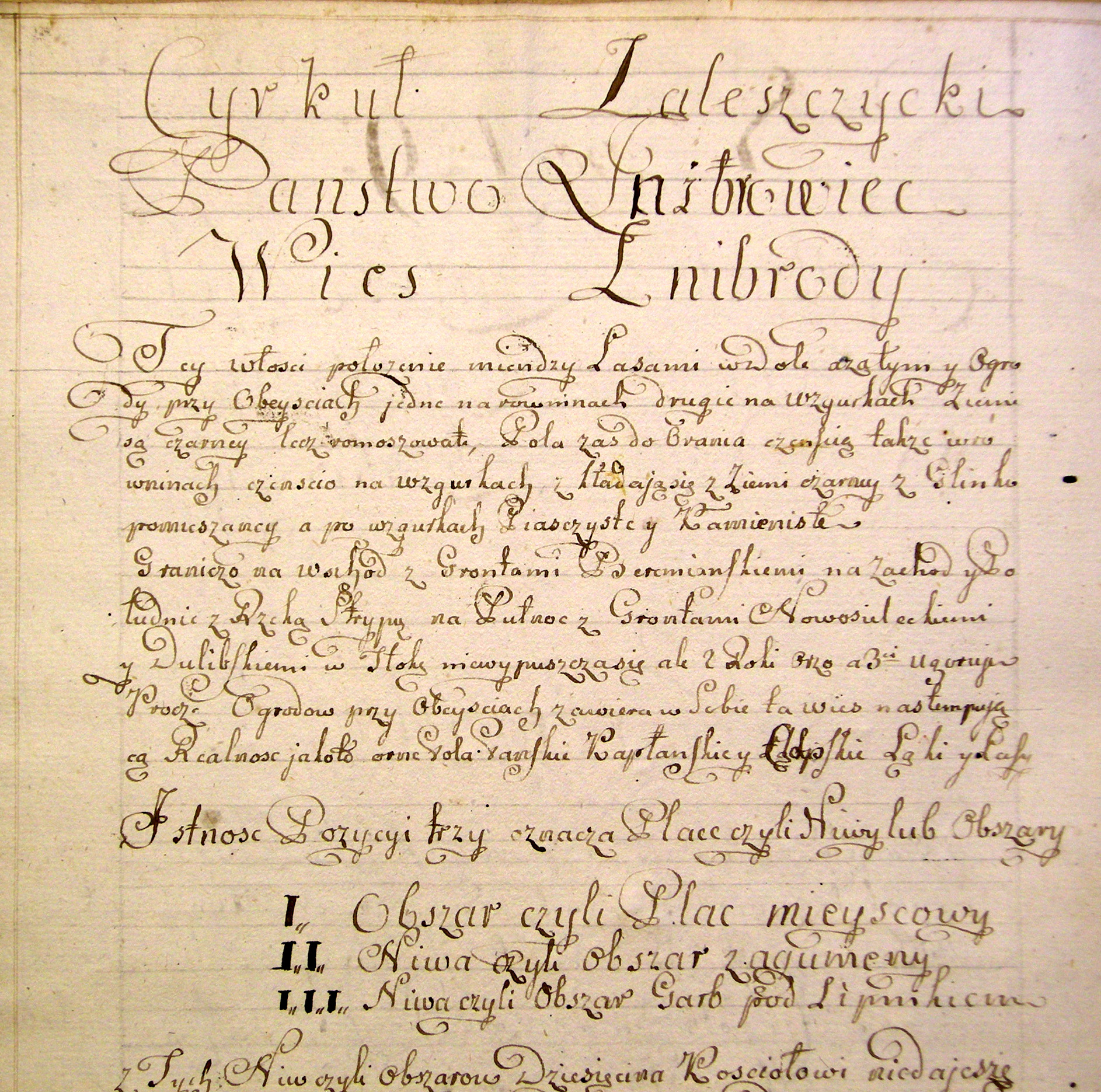
Fragment Yosyfinskian birth-certificate w. Zhnyborody.

== Religion ==
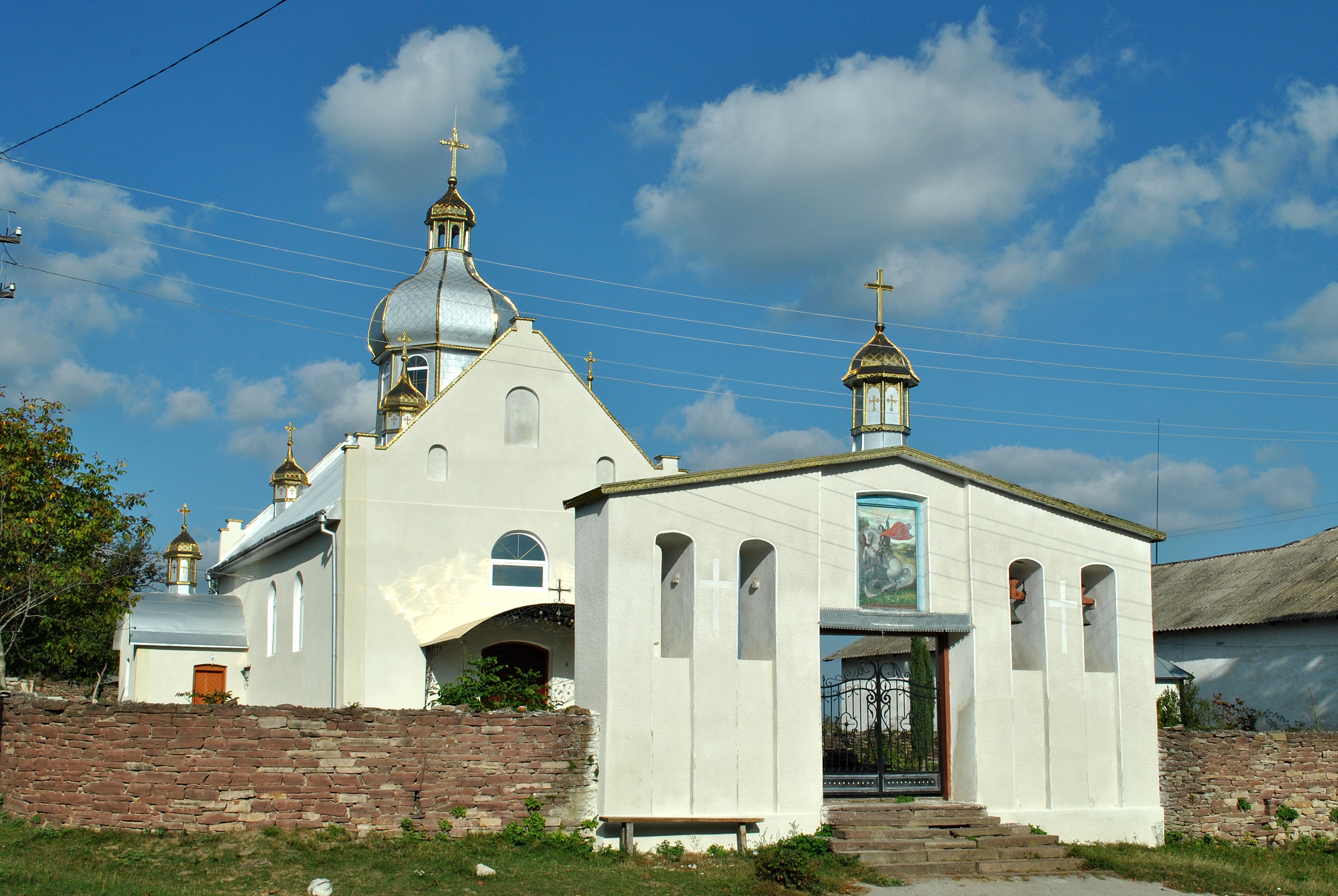
Church of saint Mihael UGCC.

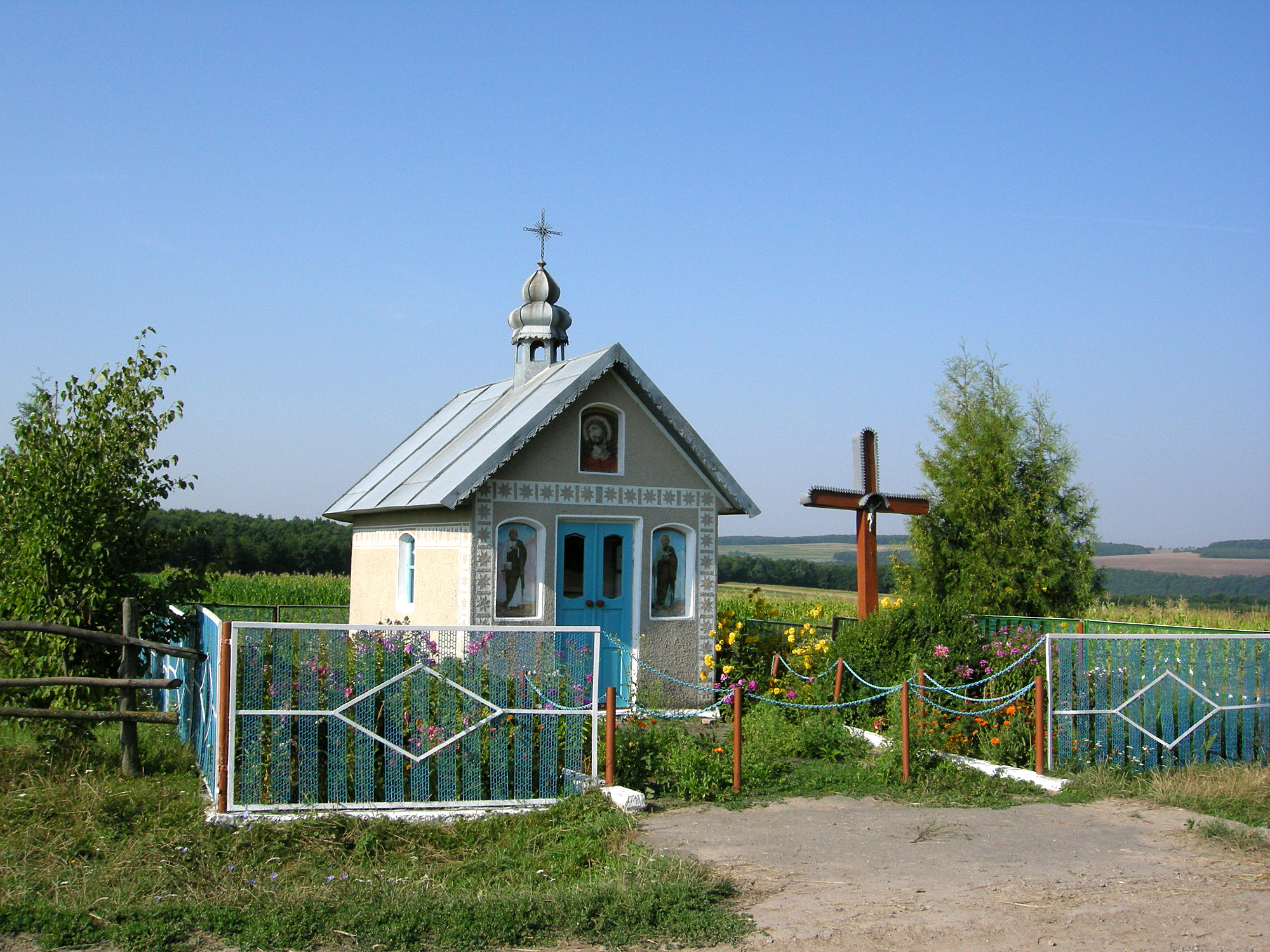
Chapel at an entrance in the Zhnyborody from the w. Duliby.

== Social sphere ==
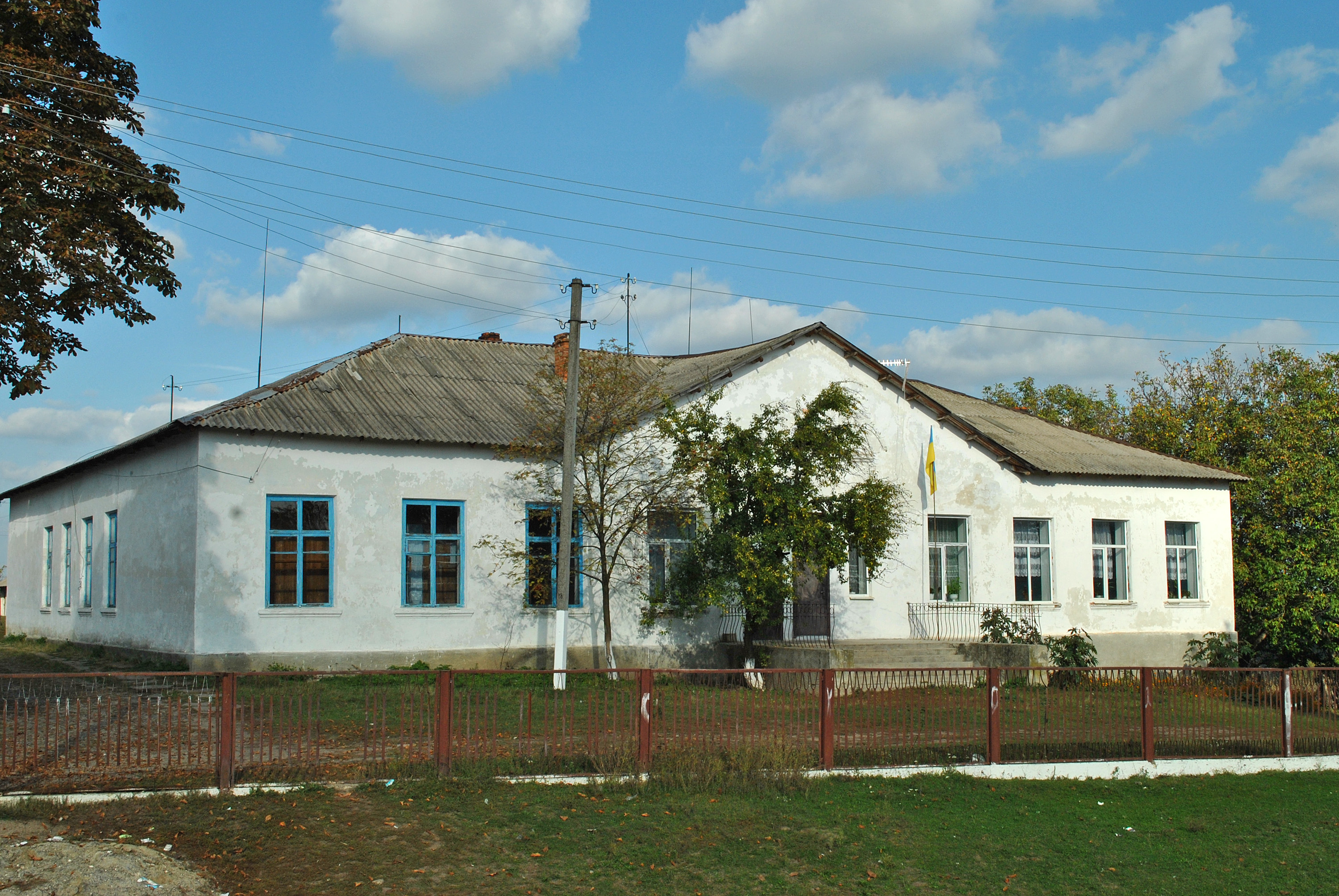
School in Zhnyborody.

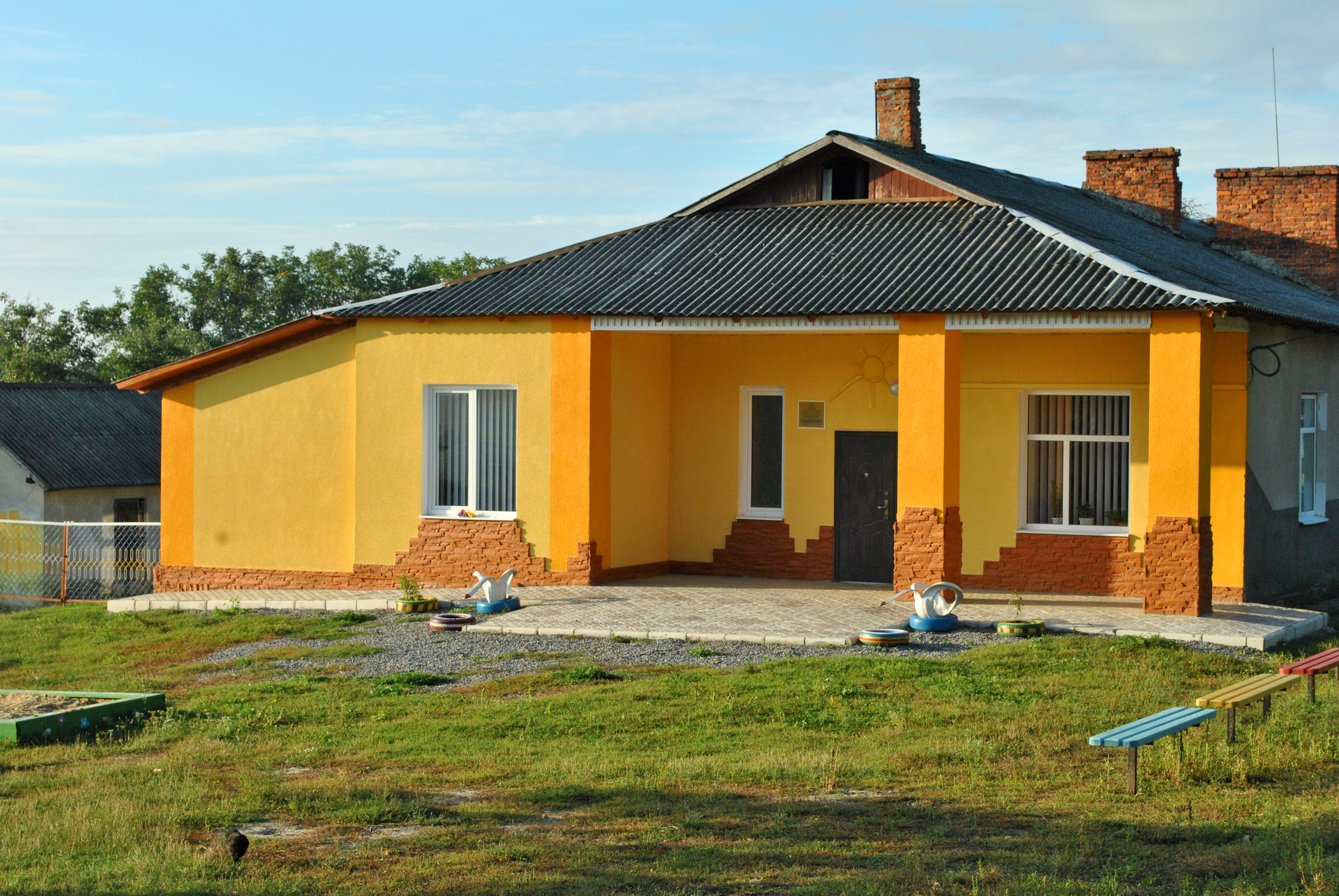
Preschool educational establishment «Prominchyk».

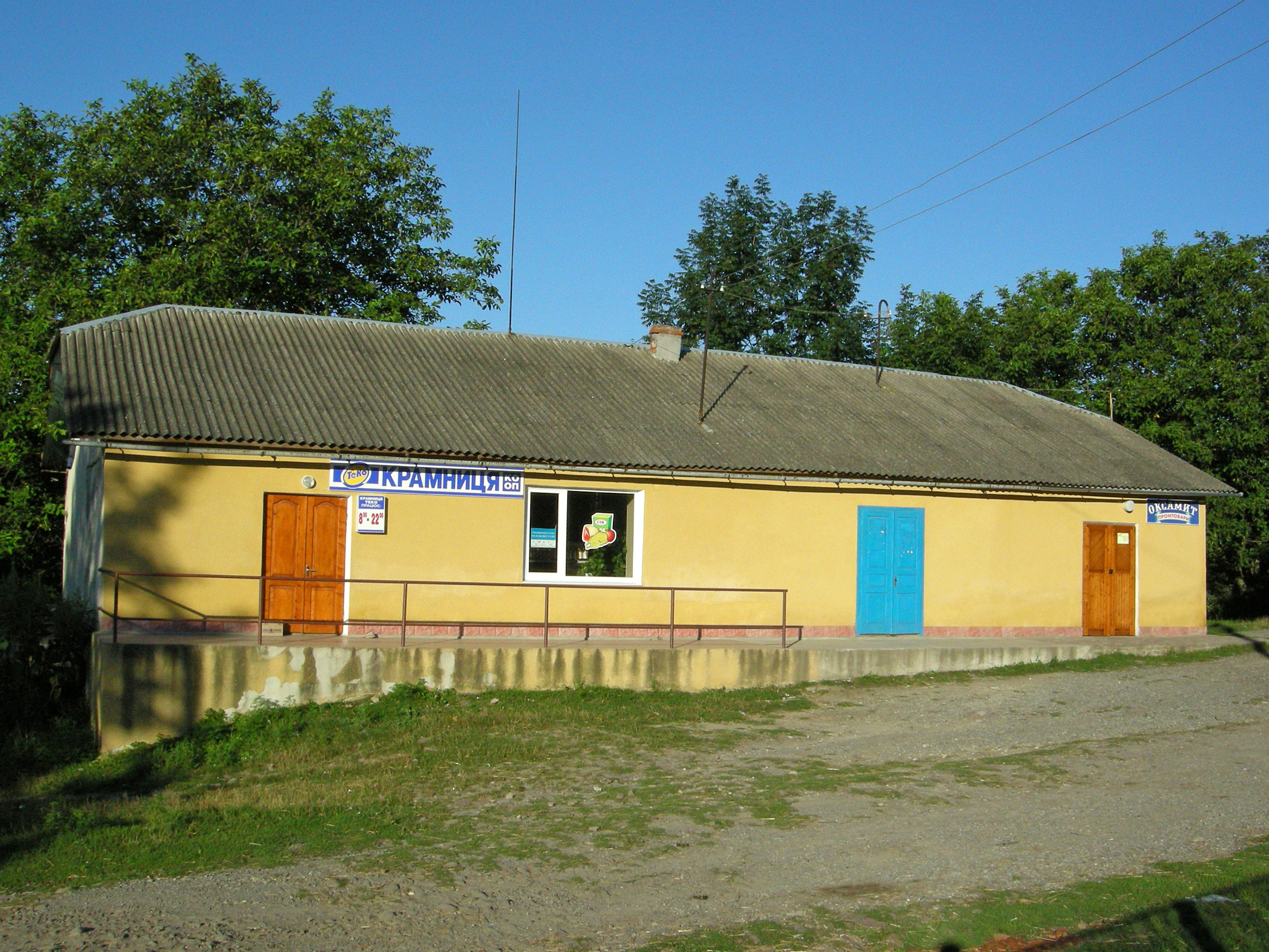
Shop.

== Nature ==
A kind is on a village. A natural boundary is «Proval».

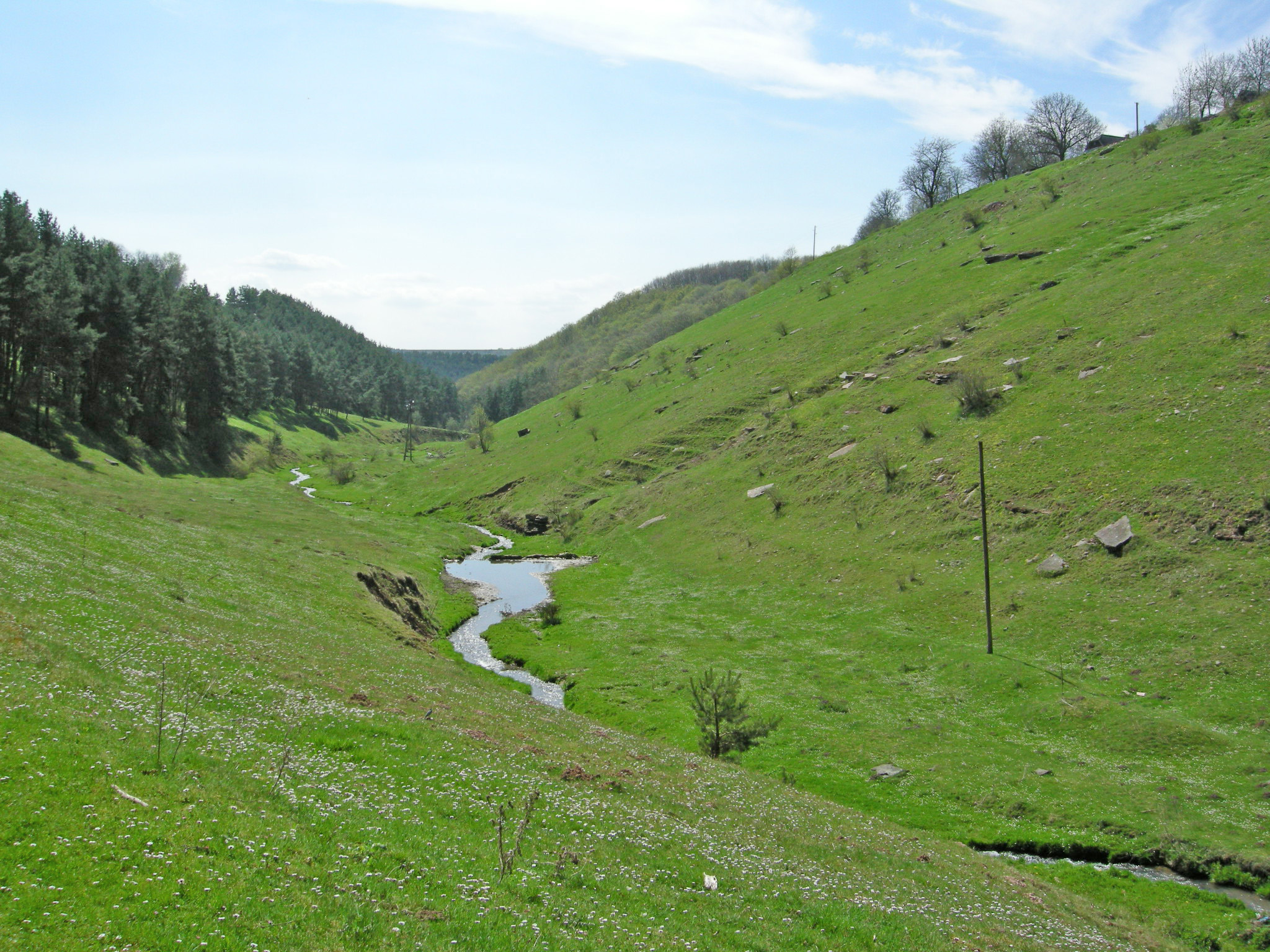
A kind is on a village. A natural boundary is «Proval».

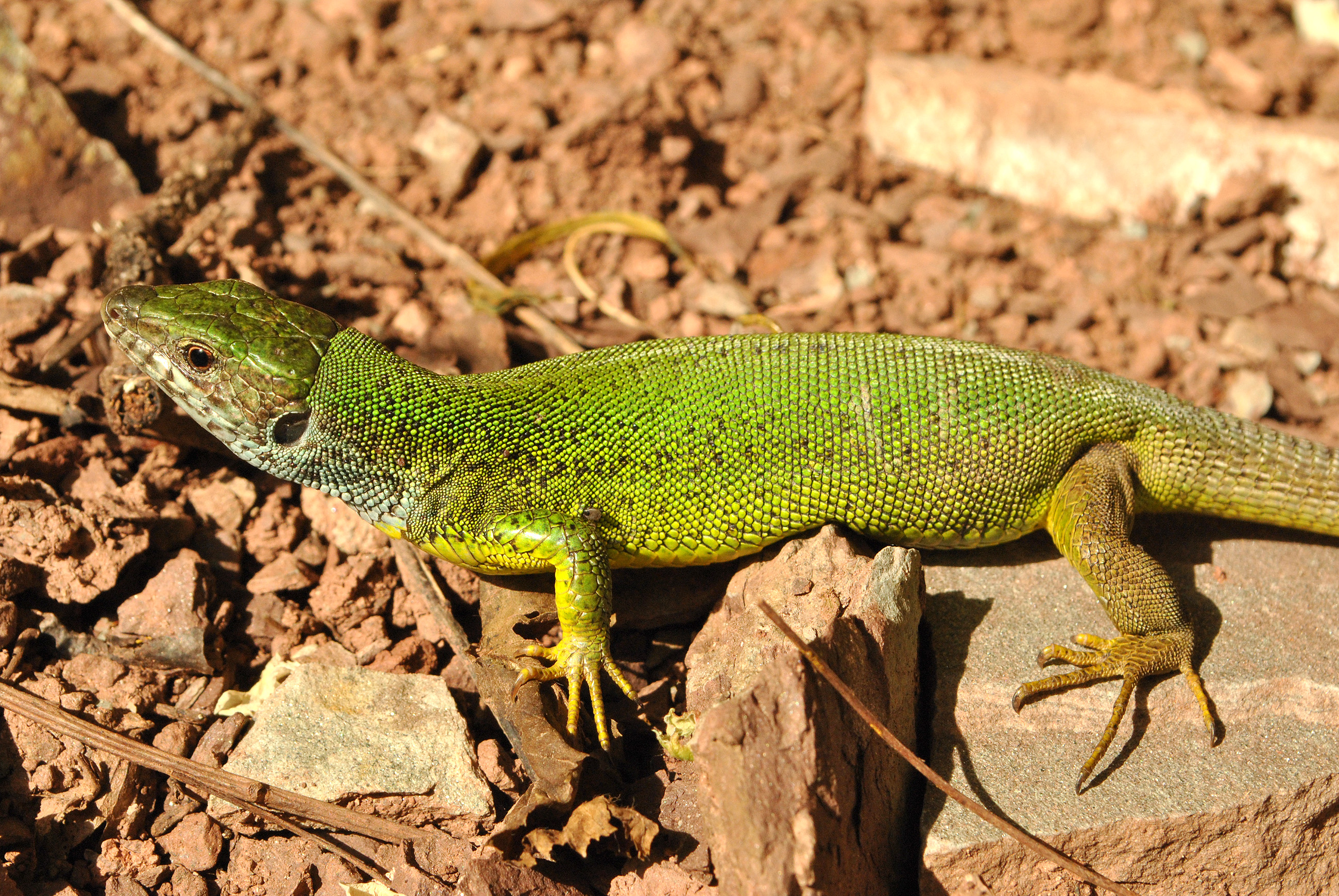
A lizard is in a lithoidal quarry near-by a natural boundary «Virlyska» on the western fence surrounding village.

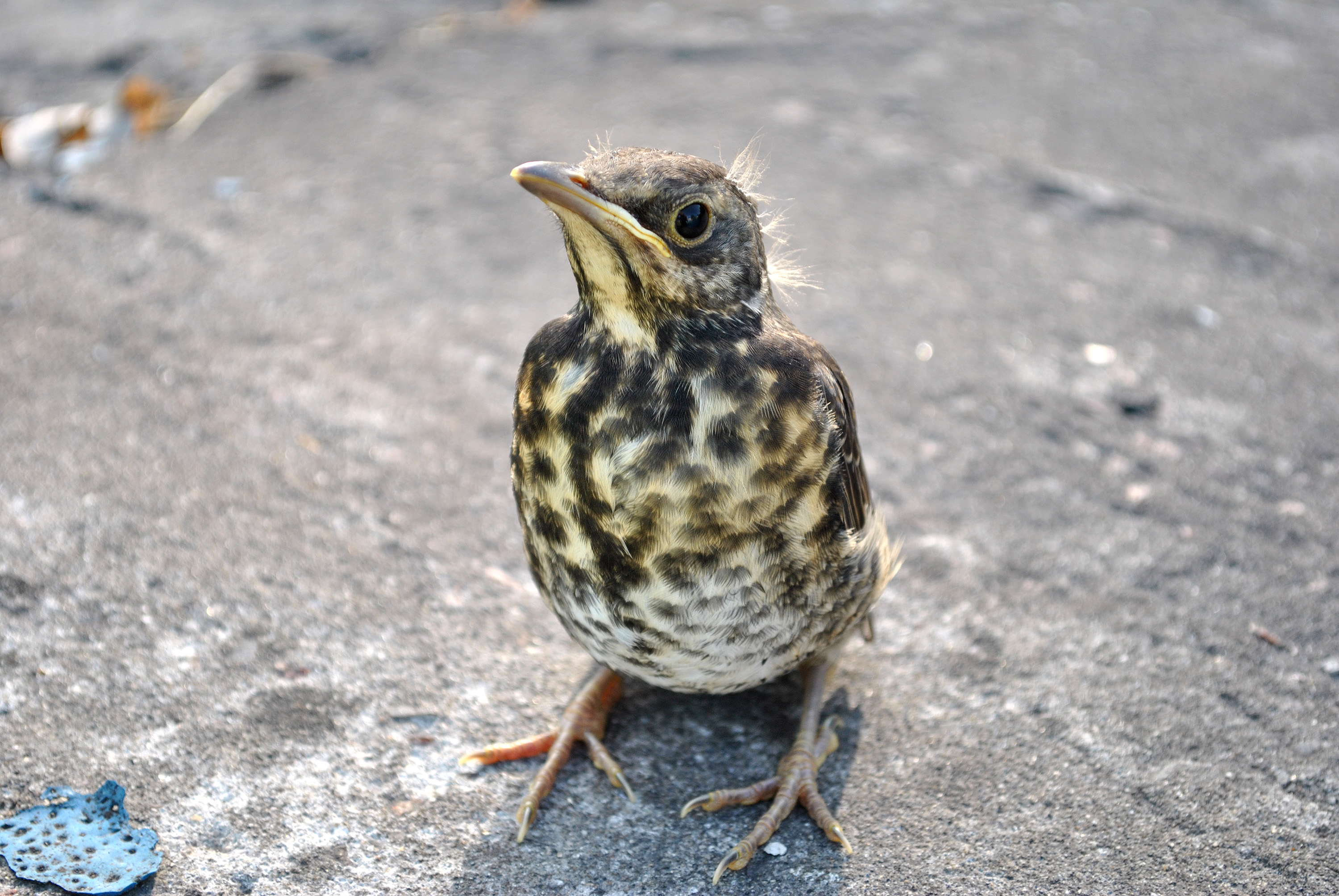
Starling.

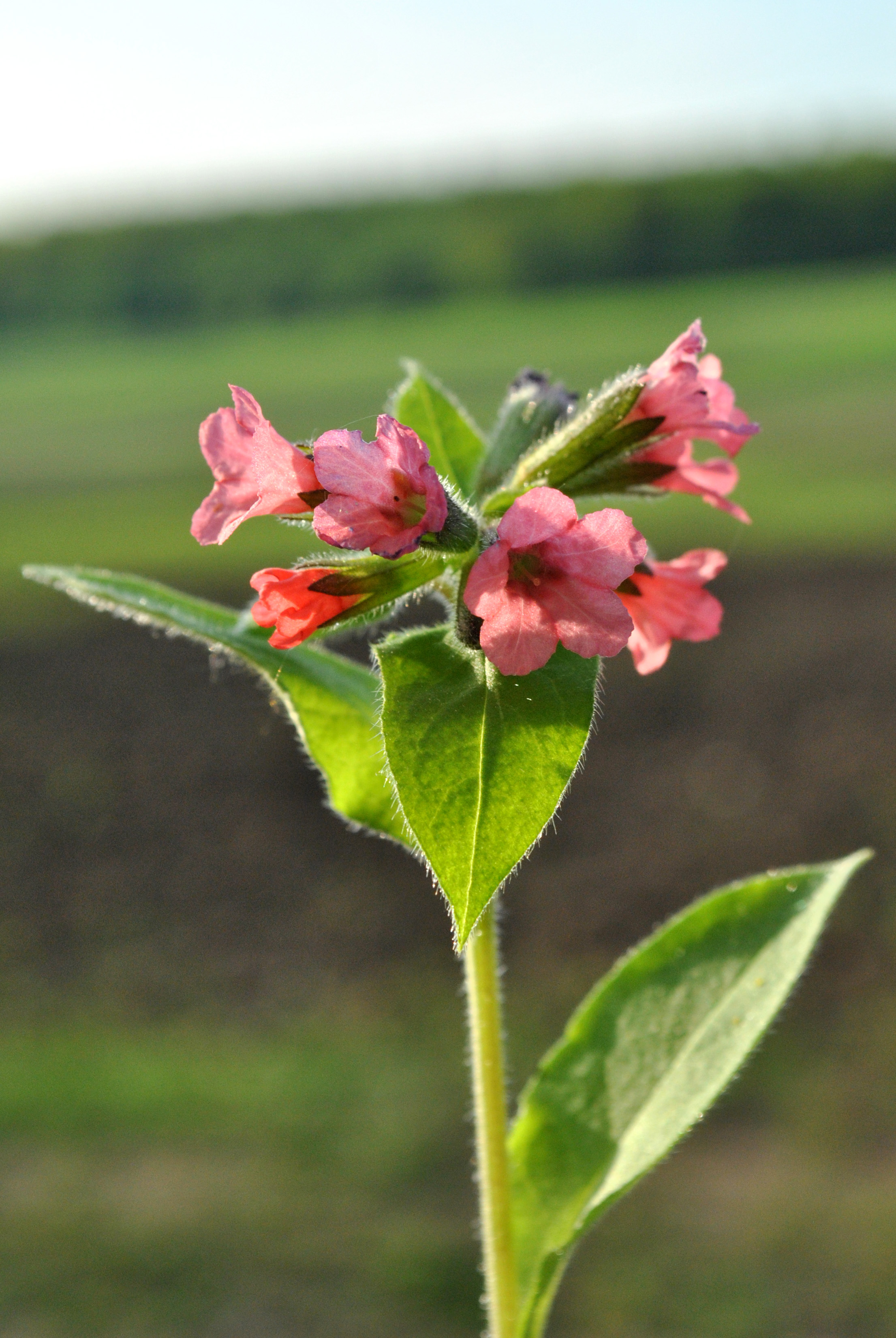
Pulmonaria.
