= Zvenyhorod (disambiguation) =

Zvenyhorod (Ukrainian: Звенигород) mean villages in the Western Ukraine.

Zvenyhorod may also refer to:

- Zvenyhorod - in Lviv Raion, Lviv Oblast. It was the former capital of the Zvenyhorod Principality
- Zvenyhorod, Ternopil Oblast - in Ternopil Oblast

== See also ==
- Zvenyhorodka
- Zvenigorod
