= Brovari =

Brovari may refer to the following places in Ukraine:

- Brovari, Ternopil Oblast
- Brovari, Khmelnytskyi Oblast
- Brovari, the name of the city Brovary, Kyiv Oblast, before 1969
