= Duliby =

Duliby (Ukrainian: Дуліби) may refer to the following places in Ukraine:

- Duliby, Stryi Raion, a village in Stryi Raion, Lviv Oblast
- Duliby, Buchach Raion, a village in Buchach Raion, Ternopil Oblast

== See also ==
- Dulebes
