= Kurdybanivka =

Rural locality in Ternopil Oblast, Ukraine

Kurdybanivka Курдибанівка
- Location in Ternopil Oblast
- Coordinates: 49°9′32″N 25°17′43″E
- Country: Ukraine
- Oblast: Ternopil Oblast
- Raion: Chortkiv Raion
- Hromada: Buchach urban hromada
- Time zone: UTC+2 (EET)
  - Summer (DST): UTC+3 (EEST)
- Postal code: 48420

Kurdybanivka (Ukrainian: Курдибанівка) is a village in Buchach urban hromada, Chortkiv Raion, Ternopil Oblast, Ukraine.

== History ==
The settlement was established in the 17th century.

After the liquidation of the Buchach Raion on 19 July 2020, the village became part of the Chortkiv Raion.

== Religion ==
- Church of the Nativity of the Blessed Virgin Mary.

== Sources ==
- (in Ukrainian) Захарчишин О., Уніят В., Курдибанівка // Ternopil Encyclopedic Dictionary: in 4 v. / editorial board: H. Yavorskyi and other, Ternopil: "Zbruch", 2005, V. 2: К—О, S. 288-289. — ISBN 966-528-199-2.
- "Kurdwanówka". Geographical Dictionary of the Kingdom of Poland (in Polish). 4. Warszawa: Kasa im. Józefa Mianowskiego. 1883. p. 893.
