= Osivtsi =

Rural locality in Ternopil Oblast, Ukraine

Osivtsi Осівці
- Location in Ternopil Oblast
- Coordinates: 49°9′28″N 25°21′34″E
- Country: Ukraine
- Oblast: Ternopil Oblast
- Raion: Chortkiv Raion
- Hromada: Buchach urban hromada
- Time zone: UTC+2 (EET)
  - Summer (DST): UTC+3 (EEST)
- Postal code: 48412

Osivtsi (Ukrainian: Осівці) is a village in Buchach urban hromada, Chortkiv Raion, Ternopil Oblast, Ukraine.

== History ==
The first written mention of the village was in 1421.

After the liquidation of the Buchach Raion on 19 July 2020, the village became part of the Chortkiv Raion.

== Religion ==
- Two churches of St. Nicholas (1927, brick, OCU; 1991, rebuilt from a Roman Catholic church, UGCC).

== Sources ==
- (in Ukrainian) Жирівська С., Мельничук Б., Осівці // Ternopil Encyclopedic Dictionary: in 4 v. / editorial board: H. Yavorskyi and other, Ternopil: "Zbruch", 2005, V. 2: К—О, S. 689–690. — ISBN 966-528-199-2.
- "Ossowce". Geographical Dictionary of the Kingdom of Poland (in Polish). 7. Warszawa: Kasa im. Józefa Mianowskiego. 1886. p. 658.
