= Buchach urban hromada =

Urban hromada in Ternopil Oblast, Ukraine

Buchach urban hromada Бучацька міська громада
- hromada
- Seal

- Location within Ternopil Oblast Location within Ukraine
- Coordinates: 49°04′00.0″N 25°23′00.0″E
- Country: Ukraine
- Oblast: Ternopil Oblast
- Raion: Chortkiv Raion
- Administrative center: Buchach

Government
  - Hromada head: Vitalii Freiak

Area
  - Total: 524.2 km^{2} (202.4 sq mi)

Population (2022)
  - Total: 37,323
- City: 1
- Villages: 36
- Website: buchachmiskrada.gov.ua

Buchach urban territorial hromada (Ukrainian: Бучацька територіальна громада, romanized: Buchatska miska terytorialna hromada) is a hromada in Ukraine, in Chortkiv Raion of Ternopil Oblast. The administrative center is the city of Buchach. Its population is 37,323 (2022 estimate)

== History ==
Formed on 11 December 2020 by amalgamation of Buchach city and Barysh, Beremiany, Bobulyntsi, Dobropole, Duliby, Zhyzhnomyr, Zhnyborody, Zaryvyntsi, Zelena, Zubrets, Kydaniv, Lishchantsi, Novi Petlykivtsi, Ozeriany, Osivtsi, Perevoloka, Porokhova, Pуredmistia, Pidzamochok, Ripyntsi, Soroky, Stari Petlykivtsi, Yazlovets village councils of Chortkiv Raion.

== Settlements ==
The hromada consists of 1 city (Buchach) and 36 villages:

- Barysh
- Beremiany
- Biliavyntsi
- Bobulyntsi
- Brovari
- Verbiatyn
- Dobropole
- Duliby
- Zhyznomyr
- Zhnyborody
- Zalishchyky
- Zaryvyntsi
- Zvenyhorod
- Zelena
- Zubrets
- Kydaniv
- Kurdybanivka
- Lishchantsi
- Mateushivka
- Novi Petlykivtsi
- Novosilka
- Ozeriany
- Osivtsi
- Perevoloka
- Peredmistia
- Pidzamochok
- Pidlissia
- Pozhezha
- Pomirtsi
- Porokhova
- Pushkari
- Ripyntsi
- Rukomysh
- Soroky
- Stari Petlykivtsi
- Yazlovets
