= Peredmistia =

Peredmistia Передмістя
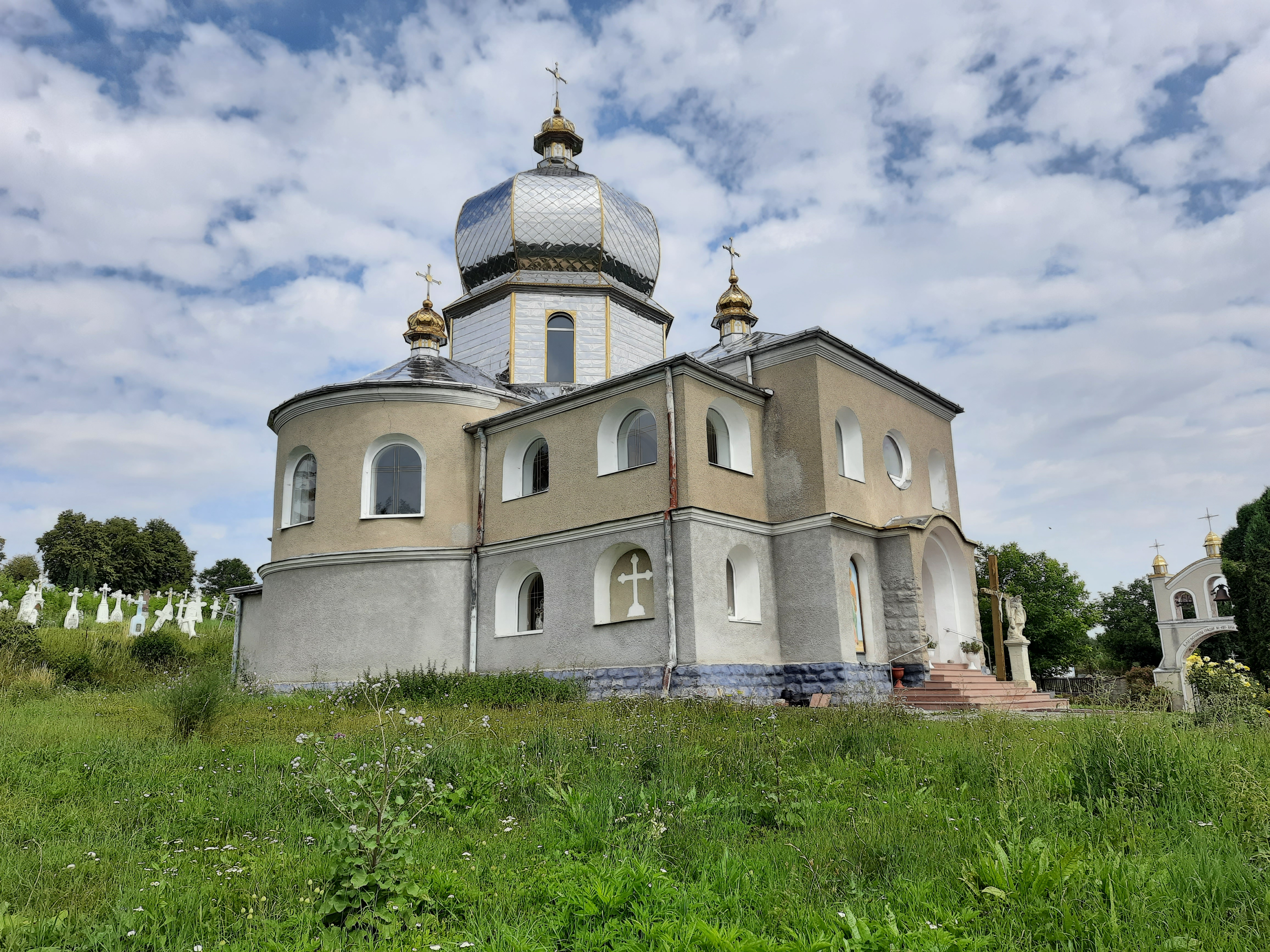
- Church of St. Michael in Peredmistia
- Interactive map of Peredmistia
- Coordinates: 48°58′25″N 25°28′23″E
- Country: Ukraine
- Oblast: Ternopil Oblast
- Raion: Chortkiv Raion

Area
  - Total: 1.130 km^{2} (0.436 sq mi)

Population (2001 census)
  - Total: 370
  - Density: 32,743/km^{2} (84,800/sq mi)
- Time zone: UTC+2 (EET)
  - Summer (DST): UTC+3 (EEST)
- Postal code: 48467
- Area code: +380 3544

Peredmistia (Ukrainian: Передмістя) is a village in Chortkiv Raion (district) of Ternopil Oblast (province) in western Ukraine. It belongs to Buchach urban hromada, one of the hromadas of Ukraine. Small river Yazlovchyk (left tributary of the river Vilhovets) flows through of the village. In the village lived 370 inhabitants on 2001, 359 - on 2007.

== History ==
The name comes from the fact that for a long time the village was part of Yazlovets.

First written mention comes from the 18th century. Then belonged to the Polish–Lithuanian Commonwealth, from 1772 until 1918 to Austrian (Habsburg monarchy, Austrian Empire, Austria-Hungary) empires, in 1918-1919 to West Ukrainian People's Republic. From 1991 belonged to Ukraine.

Reading room of Ukrainian society Prosvita operated in the village.

Until 18 July 2020, Peredmistia belonged to Buchach Raion. The raion was abolished in July 2020 as part of the administrative reform of Ukraine, which reduced the number of raions of Ternopil Oblast to three. The area of Buchach Raion was merged into Chortkiv Raion.

== Attractions ==
- Church of St. Michael
- Chapel
- Statue of Holy Virgin Mary

== Sources ==
- (in Ukrainian) Б. Таняк, В. Уніят, Передмістя // Ternopil Encyclopedic Dictionary: in 4 v. / editorial board: H. Yavorskyi and other, Ternopil: "Zbruch", 2008, V. 3: П—Я, S. 48. — ISBN 978-966-528-279-2.
- "Przedmieście". Geographical Dictionary of the Kingdom of Poland (in Polish). 9. Warszawa: Kasa im. Józefa Mianowskiego. 1888. p. 137.
