= Porokhova =

Rural locality in Ternopil Oblast, Ukraine

Porokhova Порохова
- Location in Ternopil Oblast
- Coordinates: 48°57′47″N 25°15′37″E
- Country: Ukraine
- Oblast: Ternopil Oblast
- Raion: Chortkiv Raion
- Hromada: Buchach urban hromada
- Time zone: UTC+2 (EET)
  - Summer (DST): UTC+3 (EEST)
- Postal code: 48462

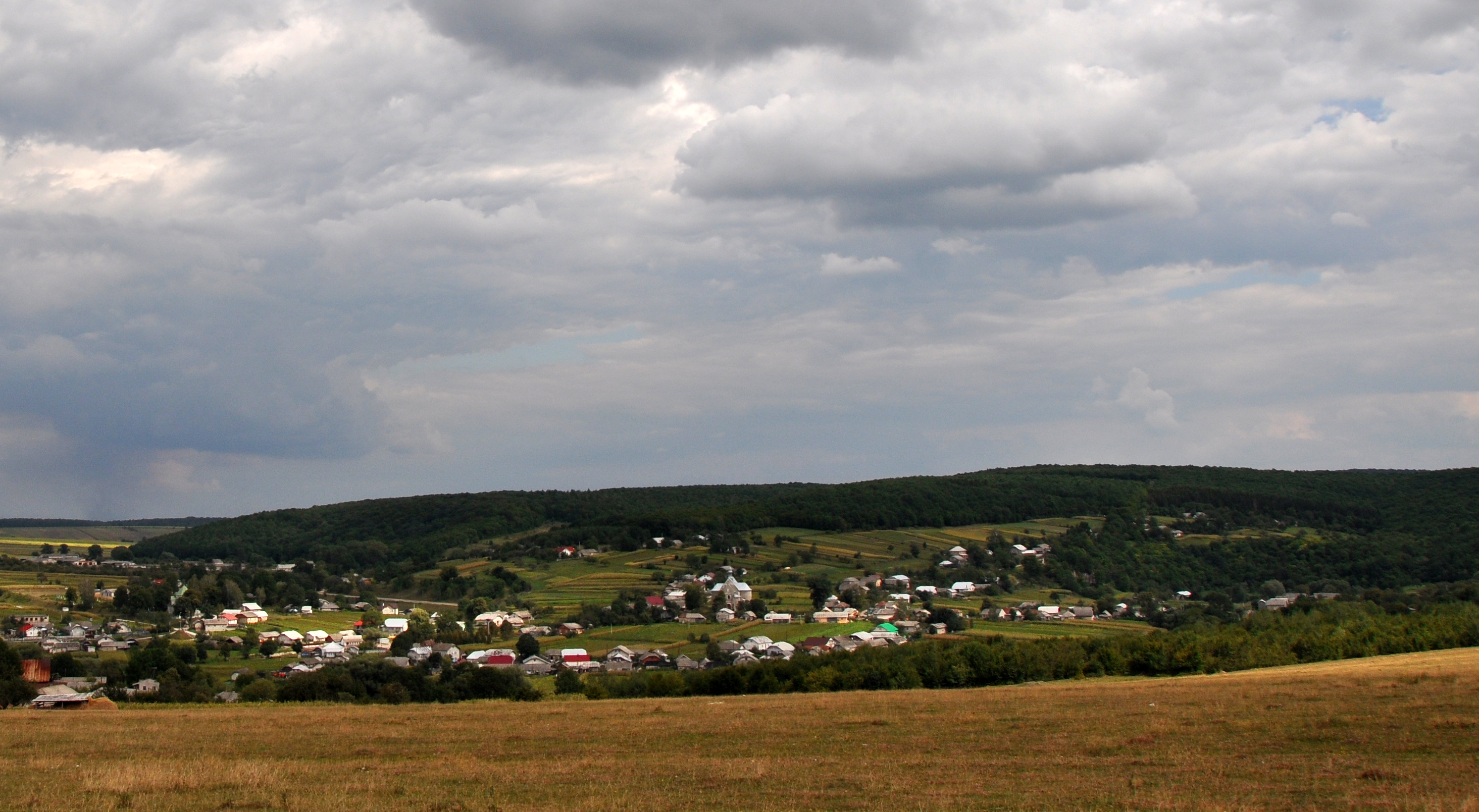

Porokhova (Ukrainian: Порохова) is a village in Buchach urban hromada, Chortkiv Raion, Ternopil Oblast, Ukraine.

== History ==
The first written mention of the village was in 1452.

After the liquidation of the Buchach Raion on 19 July 2020, the village became part of the Chortkiv Raion.

== Religion ==
- Church of the Intercession (1812, brick, restored in 1989–1991);
- Church of the Divine Mercy and the Mother of God – Queen of Peace (1930s, restored in 1995, RCC).

== Sources ==
- (in Ukrainian) Уніят В., Порохова // Ternopil Encyclopedic Dictionary: in 4 v. / editorial board: H. Yavorskyi and other, Ternopil: "Zbruch", 2008, V. 3: П—Я, S. 120-121. — ISBN 978-966-528-279-2.
- "Porchowa". Geographical Dictionary of the Kingdom of Poland (in Polish). 8. Warszawa: Kasa im. Józefa Mianowskiego. 1887. p. 815.
