= Mateushivka =

Rural locality in Ternopil Oblast, Ukraine

Mateushivka Матеушівка
- Location in Ternopil Oblast
- Coordinates: 49°11′10″N 25°30′17″E
- Country: Ukraine
- Oblast: Ternopil Oblast
- Raion: Chortkiv Raion
- Hromada: Buchach urban hromada
- Time zone: UTC+2 (EET)
  - Summer (DST): UTC+3 (EEST)
- Postal code: 48410

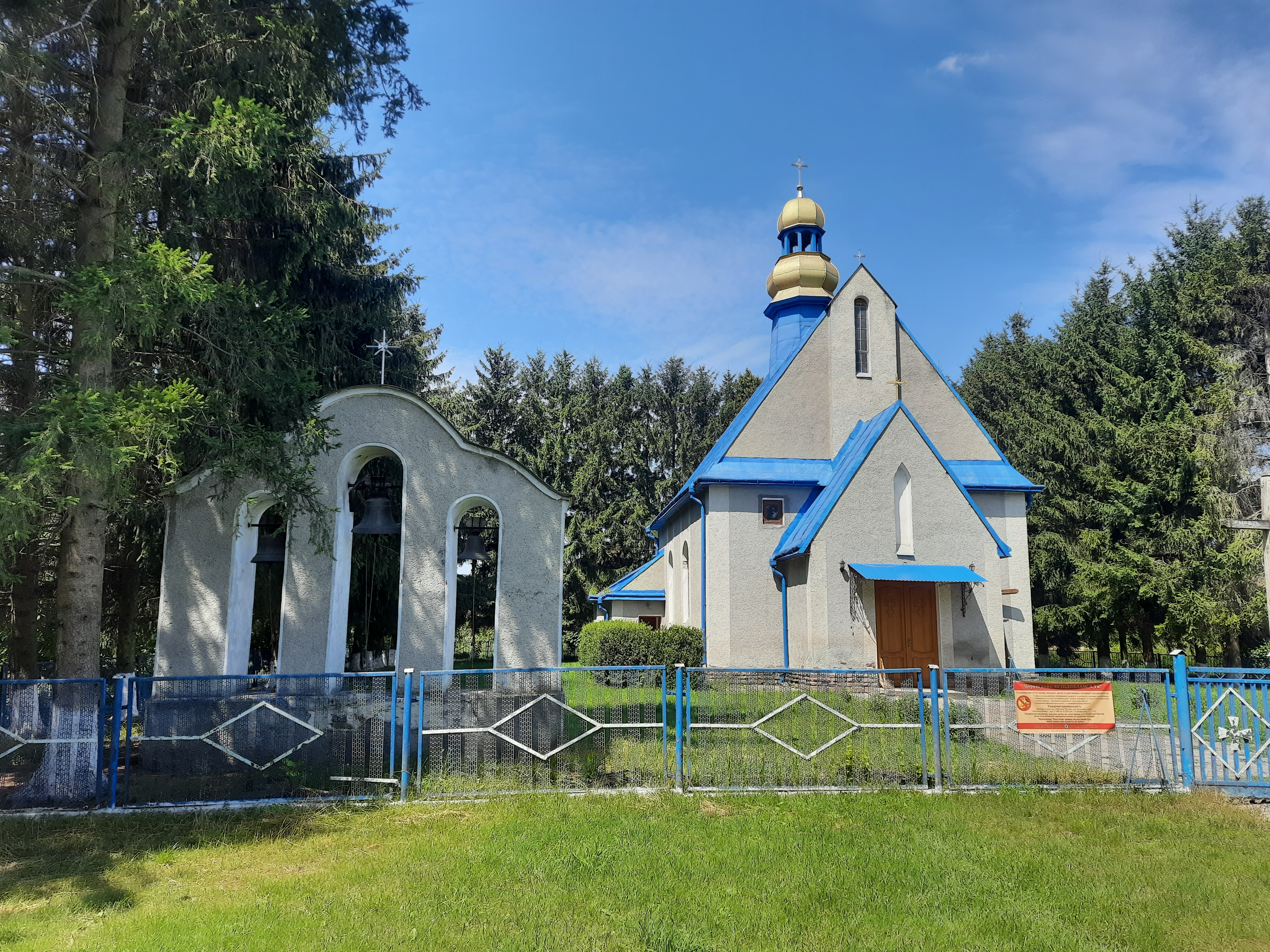
Church of the Holy Spirit, Mateushivka

Mateushivka (Ukrainian: Матеушівка) is a village in Buchach urban hromada, Chortkiv Raion, Ternopil Oblast, Ukraine.

== History ==
The village originated in the late 18th and early 19th centuries as a Polish settlement.

After the liquidation of the Buchach Raion on 19 July 2020, the village became part of the Chortkiv Raion.

== Religion ==
- Descent of the Holy Spirit church (1938; 1989, restored and rebuilt from a Roman Catholic church).

== Sources ==
- (in Ukrainian) Чайківський Ю., Матеушівка // Ternopil Encyclopedic Dictionary: in 4 v. / editorial board: H. Yavorskyi and other, Ternopil: "Zbruch", 2005, V. 2: К—О, S. 475. — ISBN 966-528-199-2.
- "Mateuszówka (1)". Geographical Dictionary of the Kingdom of Poland (in Polish). 6. Warszawa: Kasa im. Józefa Mianowskiego. 1885. p. 173.
