= Ripyntsi, Ternopil Oblast =

Rural locality in Ternopil Oblast, Ukraine

Ripyntsi Ріпинці
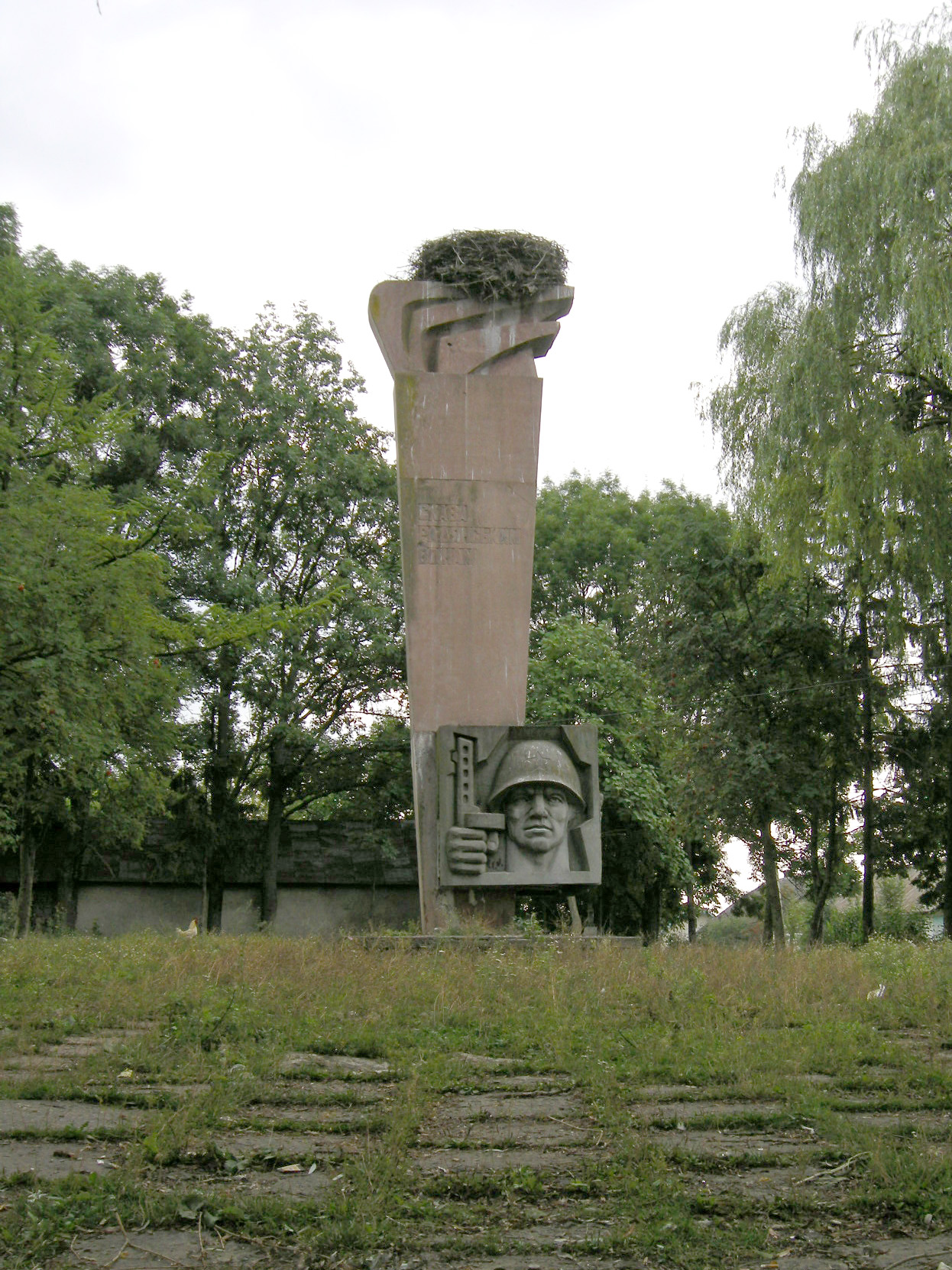
- Memorial sign to fellow countrymen who died during World War II in the village of Ripyntsi, Buchach district, Ternopil region (2007)

- Location in Ternopil Oblast
- Coordinates: 49°0′57″N 25°26′13″E
- Country: Ukraine
- Oblast: Ternopil Oblast
- Raion: Chortkiv Raion
- Hromada: Buchach urban hromada
- Time zone: UTC+2 (EET)
  - Summer (DST): UTC+3 (EEST)
- Postal code: 48433

Ripyntsi (Ukrainian: Ріпинці) is a village in Buchach urban hromada, Chortkiv Raion, Ternopil Oblast, Ukraine.

== History ==
The village is repeatedly mentioned in documents of the first half of the 17th century.

After the liquidation of the Buchach Raion on 19 July 2020, the village became part of the Chortkiv Raion.

== Religion ==
- Church of the Intercession (1995, brick).

== Sources ==
- (in Ukrainian) Данкевич Т., Уніят В., Ріпинці // Ternopil Encyclopedic Dictionary: in 4 v. / editorial board: H. Yavorskyi and other, Ternopil: "Zbruch", 2008, V. 3: П—Я, S. 184. — ISBN 978-966-528-279-2.
- "Rzepińce, wś, pow. buczacki". Geographical Dictionary of the Kingdom of Poland (in Polish). 10. Warszawa: Kasa im. Józefa Mianowskiego. 1889. p. 146.
