= Bobulyntsi =

Rural locality in Ternopil Oblast, Ukraine

Bobulyntsi Бобулинці
- Location in Ternopil Oblast
- Coordinates: 49°10′4″N 25°21′22″E
- Country: Ukraine
- Oblast: Ternopil Oblast
- Raion: Chortkiv Raion
- Hromada: Buchach urban hromada
- Time zone: UTC+2 (EET)
  - Summer (DST): UTC+3 (EEST)
- Postal code: 48472

Bobulyntsi (Ukrainian: Бобулинці) is a village in Buchach urban hromada, Chortkiv Raion, Ternopil Oblast, Ukraine.

== History ==
It was first mentioned in writings in 1421.

After the liquidation of the Buchach Raion on 19 July 2020, the village became part of the Chortkiv Raion.

== Religion ==
- Two churches of St. Michael (1801, brick, OCU; 2000, brick, UGCC),
- St. Anthony's church (1892, ruin, RCC).

== Sources ==
- (in Ukrainian) Новіцький Й., Уніят В., Бобулинці // Ternopil Encyclopedic Dictionary: in 4 v. / editorial board: H. Yavorskyi and other, Ternopil: "Zbruch", 2004, V. 1: А—Й, S. 147. — ISBN 966-528-197-6.
- "Bobulińce". Geographical Dictionary of the Kingdom of Poland (in Polish). 1. Warszawa: Kasa im. Józefa Mianowskiego. 1880. p. 268.
