= Novi Petlykivtsi =

Rural locality in Ternopil Oblast, Ukraine

Novi Petlykivtsi Нові Петликівці
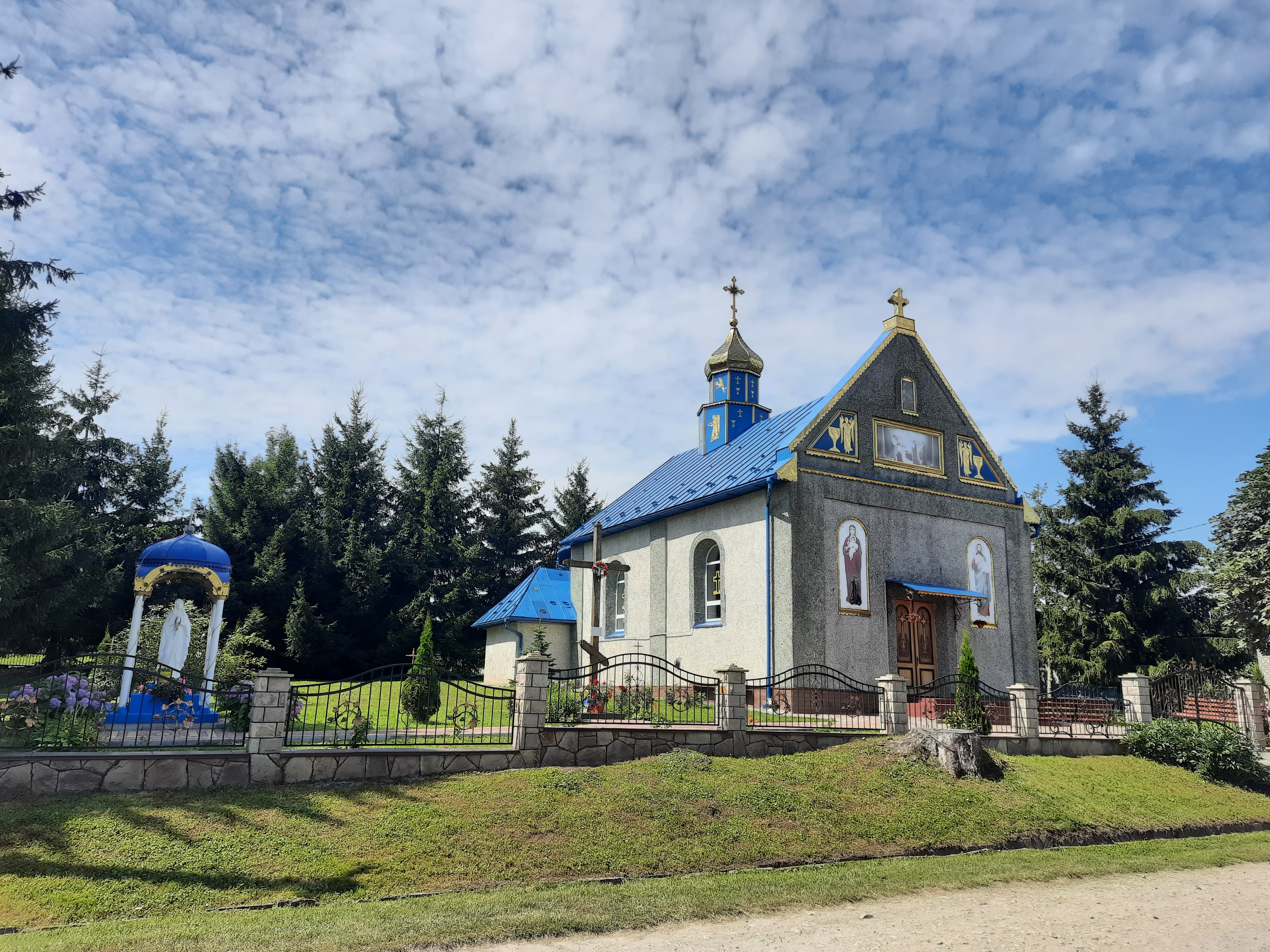
- Church of the Assumption of the Blessed Virgin Mary, OCU, village of Novi Petlykivtsi, Chortkiv district, Ternopil region

- Location in Ternopil Oblast
- Coordinates: 49°9′51″N 25°27′38″E
- Country: Ukraine
- Oblast: Ternopil Oblast
- Raion: Chortkiv Raion
- Hromada: Buchach urban hromada
- Time zone: UTC+2 (EET)
  - Summer (DST): UTC+3 (EEST)
- Postal code: 48405

Novi Petlykivtsi (Ukrainian: Нові Петликівці) is a village in Buchach urban hromada, Chortkiv Raion, Ternopil Oblast, Ukraine.

== History ==
Novi Petlykivtsi was founded in 1805.

After the liquidation of the Buchach Raion on 19 July 2020, the village became part of the Chortkiv Raion.

== Religion ==
- Two Church of the Assumption congregations are in Novi Petlykivtsi. (1890, UGCC, brick; 1991, OCU, brick).

== Sources ==
- (in Ukrainian) Єднак Т., Яворський Г., Нові Петликівці // Ternopil Encyclopedic Dictionary: in 4 v. / editorial board: H. Yavorskyi and other, Ternopil: "Zbruch", 2005, V. 2: К—О, S. 640. — ISBN 966-528-199-2.
- "Petlikowce". Geographical Dictionary of the Kingdom of Poland (in Polish). 8. Warszawa: Kasa im. Józefa Mianowskiego. 1887. p. 24.
