= Novosilka, Buchach urban hromada, Chortkiv Raion, Ternopil Oblast =

Rural locality in Ternopil Oblast, Ukraine

Novosilka Новосілка
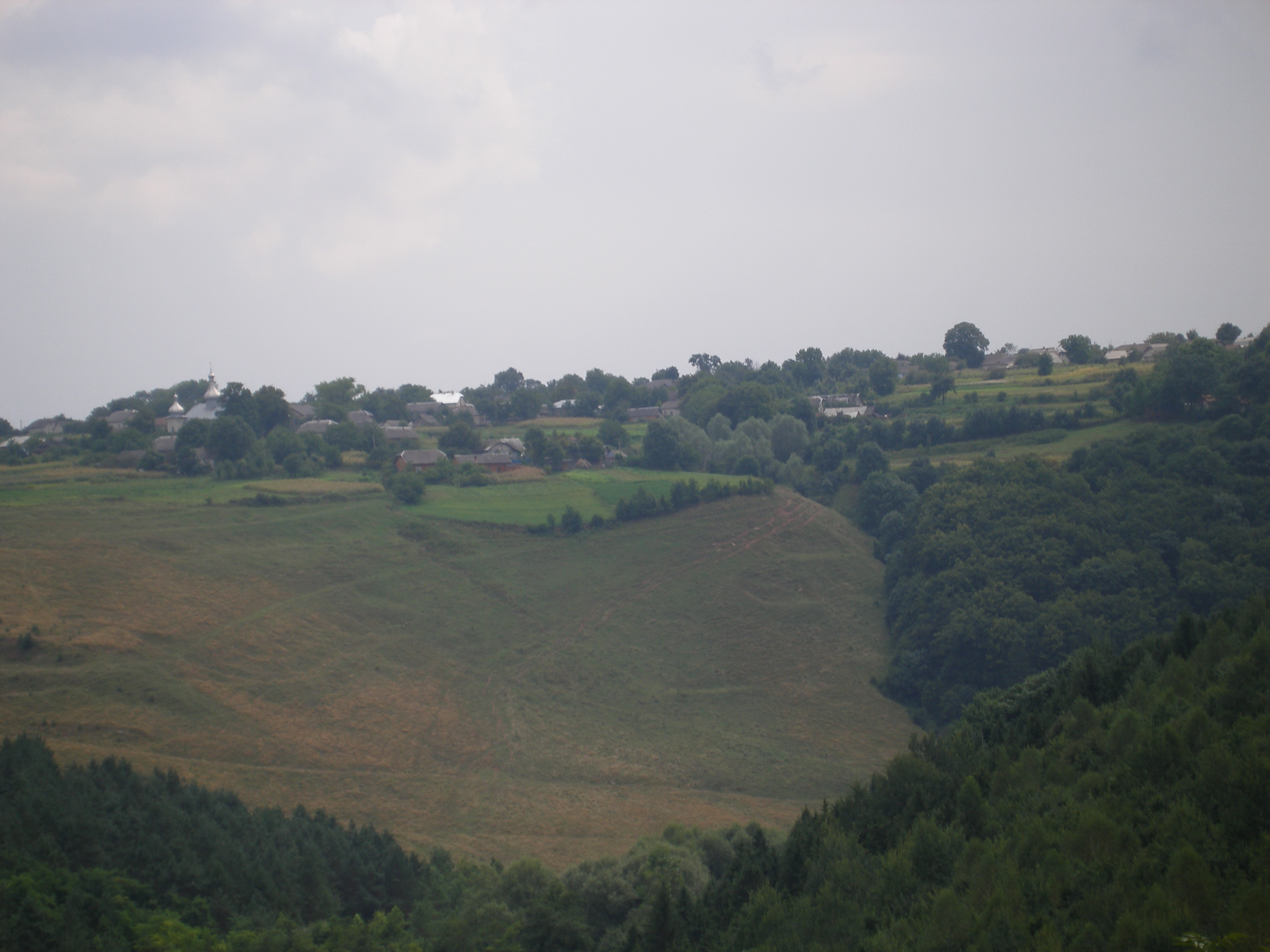

- Location in Ternopil Oblast
- Coordinates: 48°56′44″N 25°26′57″E
- Country: Ukraine
- Oblast: Ternopil Oblast
- Raion: Chortkiv Raion
- Hromada: Buchach urban hromada
- Time zone: UTC+2 (EET)
  - Summer (DST): UTC+3 (EEST)
- Postal code: 48461

Novosilka (Ukrainian: Новосілка) is a village in Buchach urban hromada, Chortkiv Raion, Ternopil Oblast, Ukraine.

== History ==
It was first written mention of the village was in 1598.

After the liquidation of the Buchach Raion on 19 July 2020, the village became part of the Chortkiv Raion.

== Religion ==
- Two churches of St. Paraskevia (1888, brick, restored in 2010, OCU; 1929, restored from a Roman Catholic church, UGCC).

== Sources ==
- (in Ukrainian) Германович П., Уніят В., Новосілка // Ternopil Encyclopedic Dictionary: in 4 v. / editorial board: H. Yavorskyi and other, Ternopil: "Zbruch", 2005, V. 2: К—О, S. 641. — ISBN 966-528-199-2.
- "Nowosiółka (3)". Geographical Dictionary of the Kingdom of Poland (in Polish). 7. Warszawa: Kasa im. Józefa Mianowskiego. 1886. p. 277.
