= Pomirtsi =

Rural locality in Ternopil Oblast, Ukraine

Pomirtsi Помірці
- Location in Ternopil Oblast
- Coordinates: 49°0′17″N 25°26′23″E
- Country: Ukraine
- Oblast: Ternopil Oblast
- Raion: Chortkiv Raion
- Hromada: Buchach urban hromada
- Time zone: UTC+2 (EET)
  - Summer (DST): UTC+3 (EEST)
- Postal code: 48433

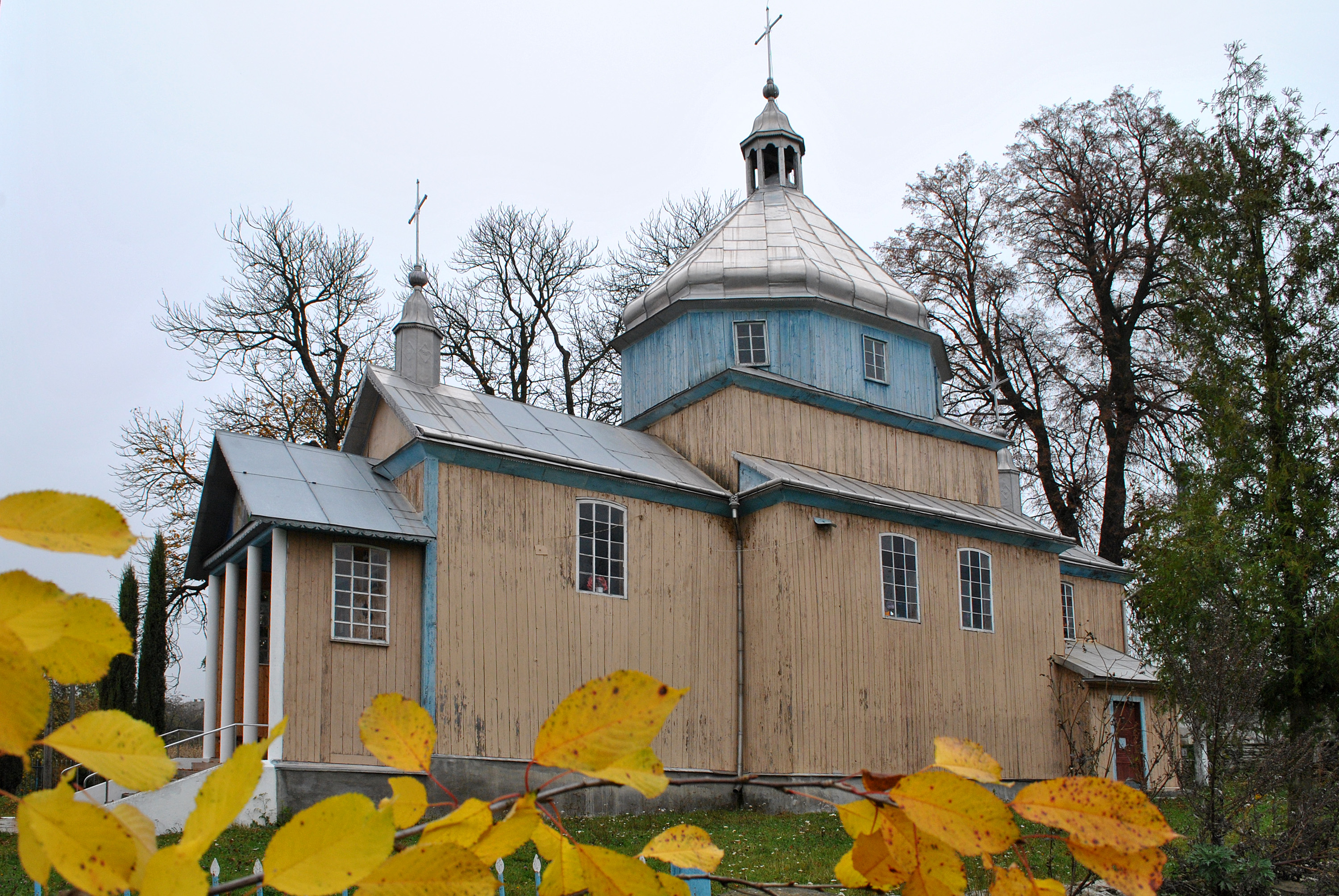
Church of the Holy Trinity (1898, wooden) in Pomyrtsy, Buchach district, Ternopil region.

Pomirtsi (Ukrainian: Помірці) is a village in Buchach urban hromada, Chortkiv Raion, Ternopil Oblast, Ukraine.

== History ==
The first written mention of the village was in 1439.

After the liquidation of the Buchach Raion on 19 July 2020, the village became part of the Chortkiv Raion.

== Religion ==
- Holy Trinity church (1898, wooden).

== Sources ==
- (in Ukrainian) Данкевич Т., Уніят В., Помірці // Ternopil Encyclopedic Dictionary: in 4 v. / editorial board: H. Yavorskyi and other, Ternopil: "Zbruch", 2008, V. 3: П—Я, S. 116–117. — ISBN 978-966-528-279-2.
- "Zady, 2.) karczma koło Pomorzec, obsz. dwor. Rzepińce". Geographical Dictionary of the Kingdom of Poland (in Polish). 14. Warszawa: Kasa im. Józefa Mianowskiego. 1895. p. 254.
