= Dobropole, Ternopil Oblast =

Rural locality in Ternopil Oblast, Ukraine

Dobropole Доброполе
- Location in Ternopil Oblast
- Coordinates: 49°11′43″N 25°25′34″E
- Country: Ukraine
- Oblast: Ternopil Oblast
- Raion: Chortkiv Raion
- Hromada: Buchach urban hromada
- Time zone: UTC+2 (EET)
  - Summer (DST): UTC+3 (EEST)
- Postal code: 48410

Dobropole (Ukrainian: Доброполе) is a village in Buchach urban hromada, Chortkiv Raion, Ternopil Oblast, Ukraine.

== History ==
It was first mentioned in writings in 1785.

After the liquidation of the Buchach Raion on 19 July 2020, the village became part of the Chortkiv Raion.

== Religion ==
- Church of St. John the Baptist (1992; brick, restored at the expense of the French-born doctor of theology, Yosyp Andriishyn, whose parents were from the village, UGCC),
- the church (restored in 1991; not functioning, RCC).

== Sources ==
- (in Ukrainian) Чайківський Ю., Яворський Г., Доброполе // Ternopil Encyclopedic Dictionary: in 4 v. / editorial board: H. Yavorskyi and other, Ternopil: "Zbruch", 2004, V. 1: А—Й, S. 512. — ISBN 966-528-197-6.
- "Dobropole (z Mateuszówką)". Geographical Dictionary of the Kingdom of Poland (in Polish). 2. Warszawa: Kasa im. Józefa Mianowskiego. 1881. p. 76.
