= Soroky, Ternopil Oblast =

Rural locality in Ternopil Oblast, Ukraine

Soroky Сороки
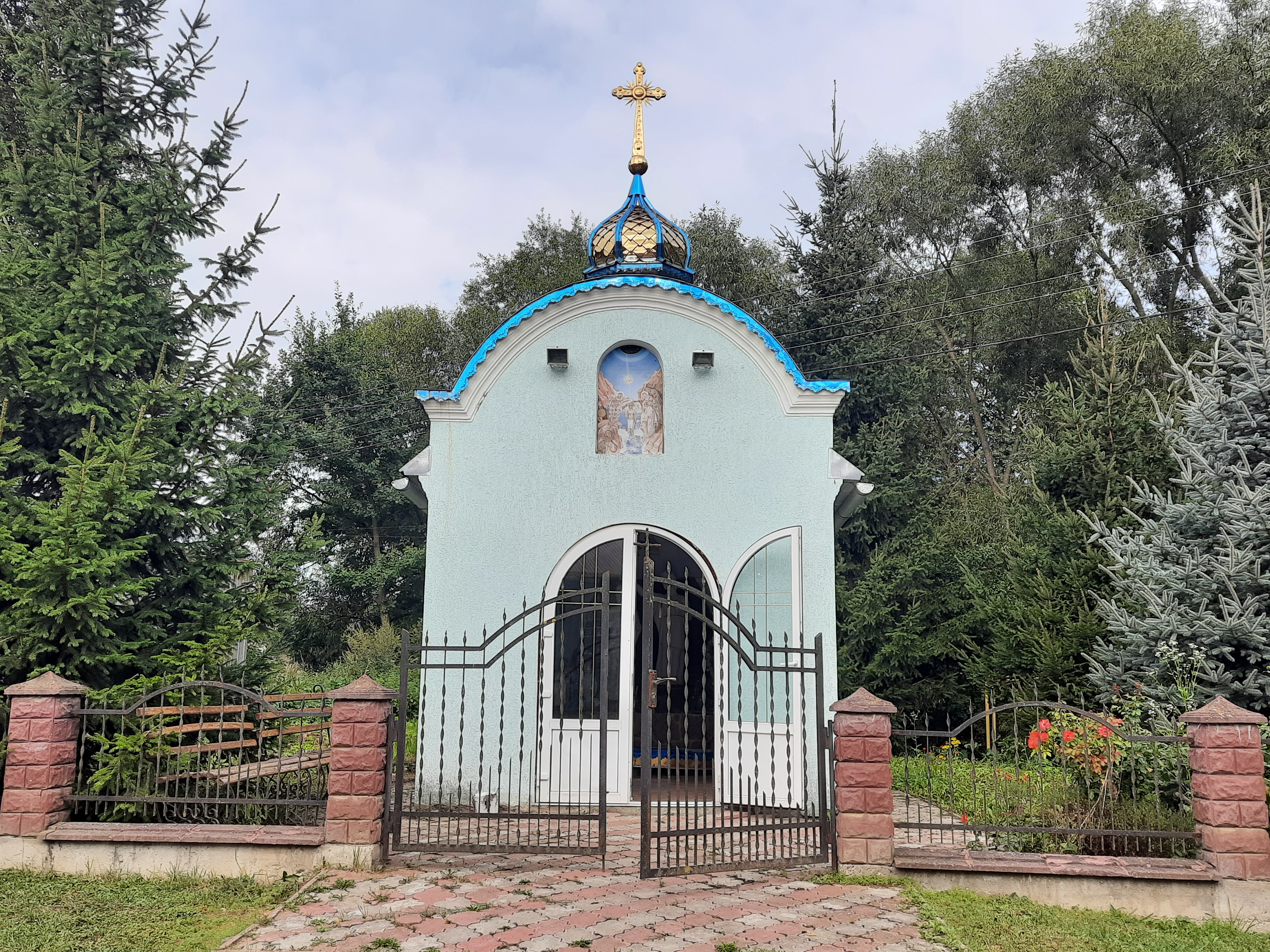
- Chapel of the village of Soroki Chortkiv district, Ternopil region

- Location in Ternopil Oblast
- Coordinates: 49°0′29″N 25°22′23″E
- Country: Ukraine
- Oblast: Ternopil Oblast
- Raion: Chortkiv Raion
- Hromada: Buchach urban hromada
- Time zone: UTC+2 (EET)
  - Summer (DST): UTC+3 (EEST)
- Postal code: 48440

Soroky (Ukrainian: Сороки) is a village in Buchach urban hromada, Chortkiv Raion, Ternopil Oblast, Ukraine.

== History ==
The first written mention was in 1457.

After the liquidation of the Buchach Raion on 19 July 2020, the village became part of the Chortkiv Raion.

== Religion ==
- Saint Paraskeva Ternovska church (1887, reconstructed in 2000).

== Sources ==
- (in Ukrainian) Уніят В, Шмигельський В., Сороки // Ternopil Encyclopedic Dictionary: in 4 v. / editorial board: H. Yavorskyi and other, Ternopil: "Zbruch", 2008, V. 3: П—Я, S. 316. — ISBN 978-966-528-279-2.
- "Soroki (2)". Geographical Dictionary of the Kingdom of Poland (in Polish). 11. Warszawa: Kasa im. Józefa Mianowskiego. 1890. p. 84.
