= Lishchantsi =

Rural locality in Ternopil Oblast, Ukraine

Lishchantsi Ліщанці
- Location in Ternopil Oblast
- Coordinates: 48°59′11″N 25°23′14″E
- Country: Ukraine
- Oblast: Ternopil Oblast
- Raion: Chortkiv Raion
- Hromada: Buchach urban hromada
- Time zone: UTC+2 (EET)
  - Summer (DST): UTC+3 (EEST)
- Postal code: 48422

Lishchantsi (Ukrainian: Ліщанці) is a village in Buchach urban hromada, Chortkiv Raion, Ternopil Oblast, Ukraine.

== History ==
It was first mentioned in writings in 1459.

After the liquidation of the Buchach Raion on 19 July 2020, the village became part of the Chortkiv Raion.

== Religion ==
- Saint Paraskeva Pyatnitsa church (1832, brick).

== Sources ==
- (in Ukrainian) Вітик П., Ковальков Ю., Ліщанці // Ternopil Encyclopedic Dictionary: in 4 v. / editorial board: H. Yavorskyi and other, Ternopil: "Zbruch", 2005, V. 2: К—О, S. 382. — ISBN 966-528-199-2.
- "Leszczańce". Geographical Dictionary of the Kingdom of Poland (in Polish). 5. Warszawa: Kasa im. Józefa Mianowskiego. 1884. p. 168—169.
