= Pushkari, Ternopil Oblast =

Rural locality in Ternopil Oblast, Ukraine

Pushkari Пушкарі
- Location in Ternopil Oblast
- Coordinates: 49°9′17″N 25°29′35″E
- Country: Ukraine
- Oblast: Ternopil Oblast
- Raion: Chortkiv Raion
- Hromada: Buchach urban hromada
- Time zone: UTC+2 (EET)
  - Summer (DST): UTC+3 (EEST)
- Postal code: 48405

Pushkari (Ukrainian: Пушкарі) is a village in Buchach urban hromada, Chortkiv Raion, Ternopil Oblast, Ukraine.

== History ==
The first written mention of the village was in 1850.

After the liquidation of the Buchach Raion on 19 July 2020, the village became part of the Chortkiv Raion.

== Religion ==
- Saints Peter and Paul church (1995).

== Sources ==
- (in Ukrainian) Єднак Т., Уніят В., Пушкарі // Ternopil Encyclopedic Dictionary: in 4 v. / editorial board: H. Yavorskyi and other, Ternopil: "Zbruch", 2008, V. 3: П—Я, S. 160. — ISBN 978-966-528-279-2.
- (in Ukrainian) Єднак Т., Уніят В., Пушкарі // Ternopil Oblast. History of cities and villages: in 3 v. / Ternopil: "Terno-graph", 2014, V. 1: А—В, S. 643. — ISBN 978-966-457-228-3.
