= Pozhezha, Ternopil Oblast =

Rural locality in Ternopil Oblast, Ukraine

Pozhezha Пожежа
- Location in Ternopil Oblast
- Coordinates: 48°55′41″N 25°32′1″E
- Country: Ukraine
- Oblast: Ternopil Oblast
- Raion: Chortkiv Raion
- Hromada: Buchach urban hromada
- Time zone: UTC+2 (EET)
  - Summer (DST): UTC+3 (EEST)
- Postal code: 48461

Pozhezha (Ukrainian: Пожежа) is a village in Buchach urban hromada, Chortkiv Raion, Ternopil Oblast, Ukraine.

== History ==
It's been known since the first half of AD 19.

After the liquidation of the Buchach Raion on 19 July 2020, the village became part of the Chortkiv Raion.

== Religion ==
A dilapidated wooden church has been preserved.
