= Zvenyhorod, Ternopil Oblast =

Zvenyhorod Звенигород
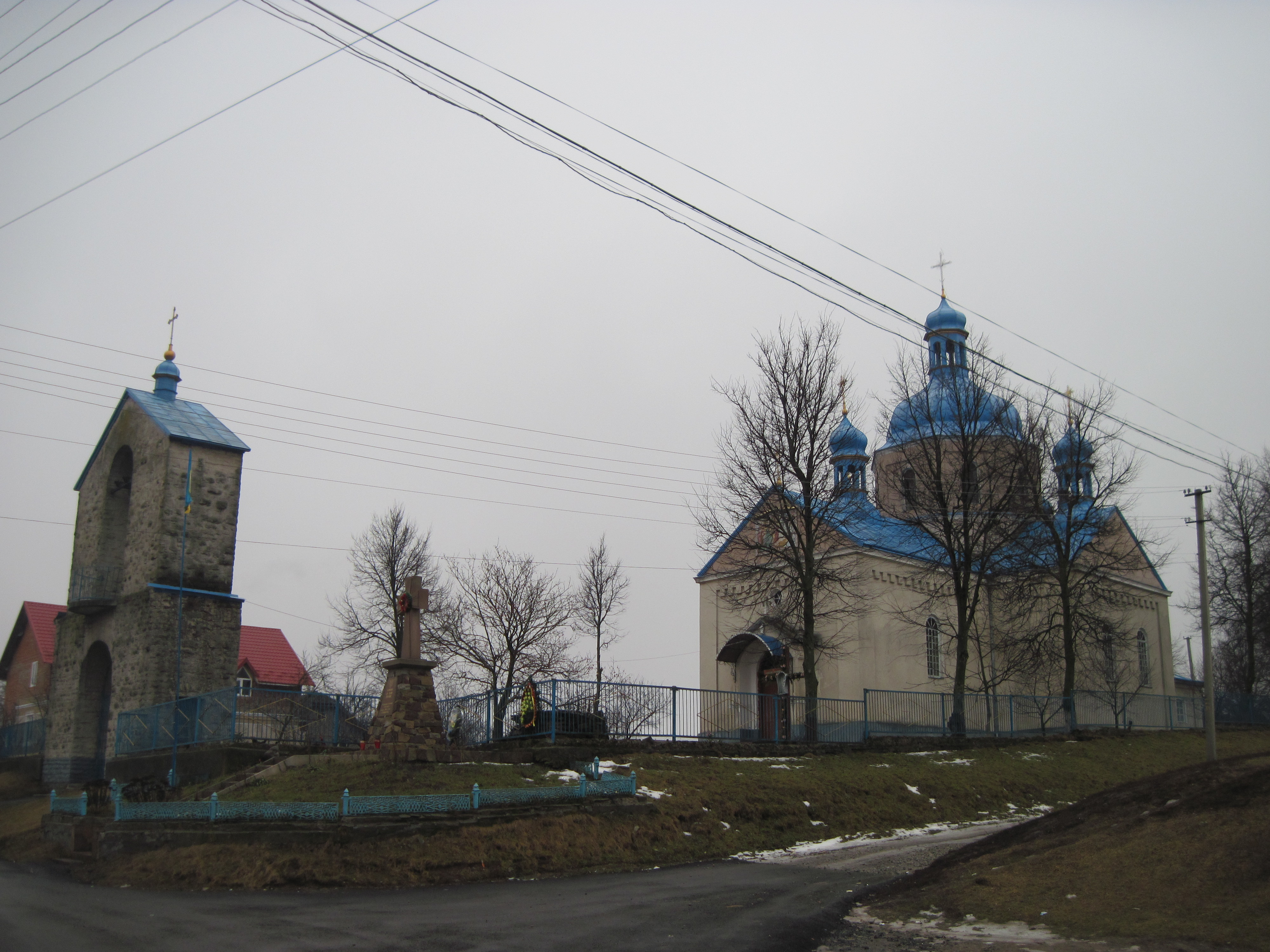
- Interactive map of Zvenyhorod
- Coordinates: 49°05′30″N 25°24′10″E
- Country: Ukraine
- Oblast: Ternopil Oblast
- Raion: Chortkiv Raion

Area
  - Total: 1.050 km^{2} (0.405 sq mi)

Population (2001 census)
  - Total: 841
  - Density: 800.95/km^{2} (2,074.5/sq mi)
- Time zone: UTC+2 (EET)
  - Summer (DST): UTC+3 (EEST)
- Postal code: 48423
- Area code: +380 3544

Zvenyhorod (Ukrainian: Звенигород, Polish: Dźwinogród) is a village in Chortkiv Raion (district) of Ternopil Oblast (province) in western Ukraine. It belongs to Buchach urban hromada, one of the hromadas of Ukraine. The Strypa River, a left tributary of the Dniester river, flows near of the village.

== History ==
First written mention comes from the 18th century. Then belonged to the Polish–Lithuanian Commonwealth, from 1772 until 1918 to Austrian (Habsburg monarchy, Austrian Empire, Austria-Hungary) empires, in 1918–1919 to West Ukrainian People's Republic. From 1991 belonged to Ukraine.

Reading room of Ukrainian society Prosvita operated in the village.

Until 18 July 2020, Zvenyhorod belonged to Buchach Raion. The raion was abolished in July 2020 as part of the administrative reform of Ukraine, which reduced the number of raions of Ternopil Oblast to three. The area of Buchach Raion was merged into Chortkiv Raion.

== Attractions ==
- Church in the Temple of the Blessed Virgin
- Chapel (2002)
- Roman Catholic Church (1934)
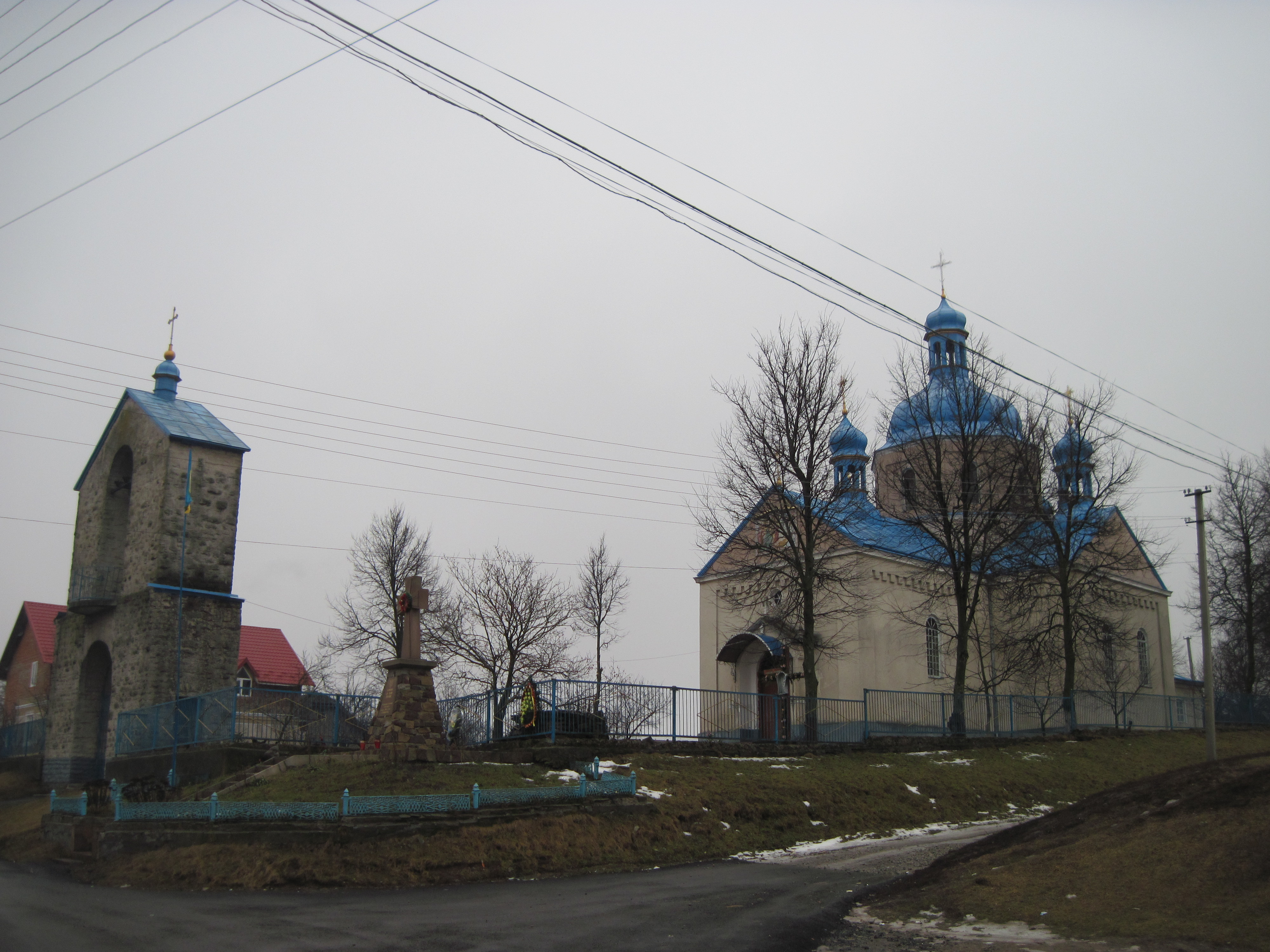

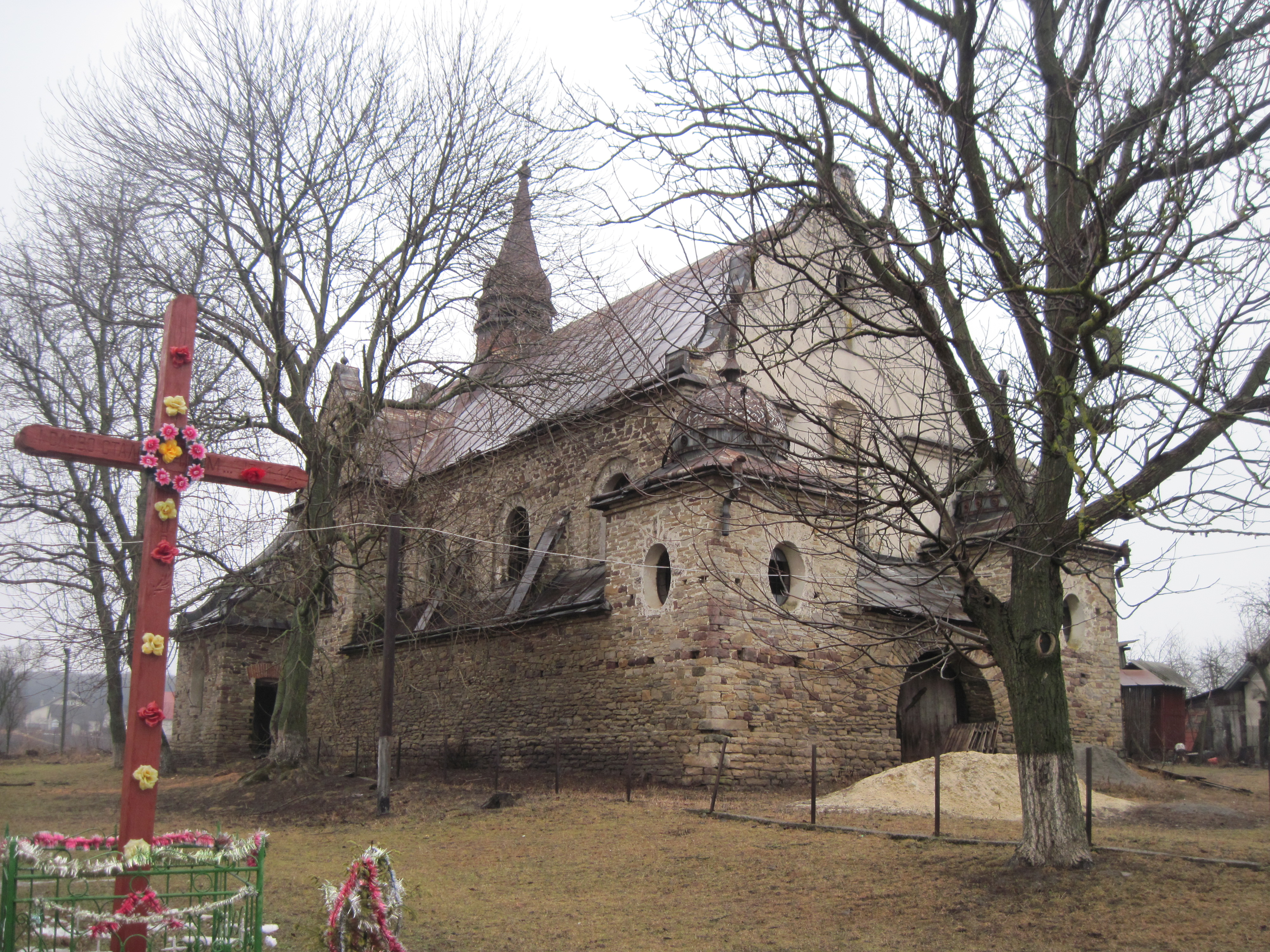

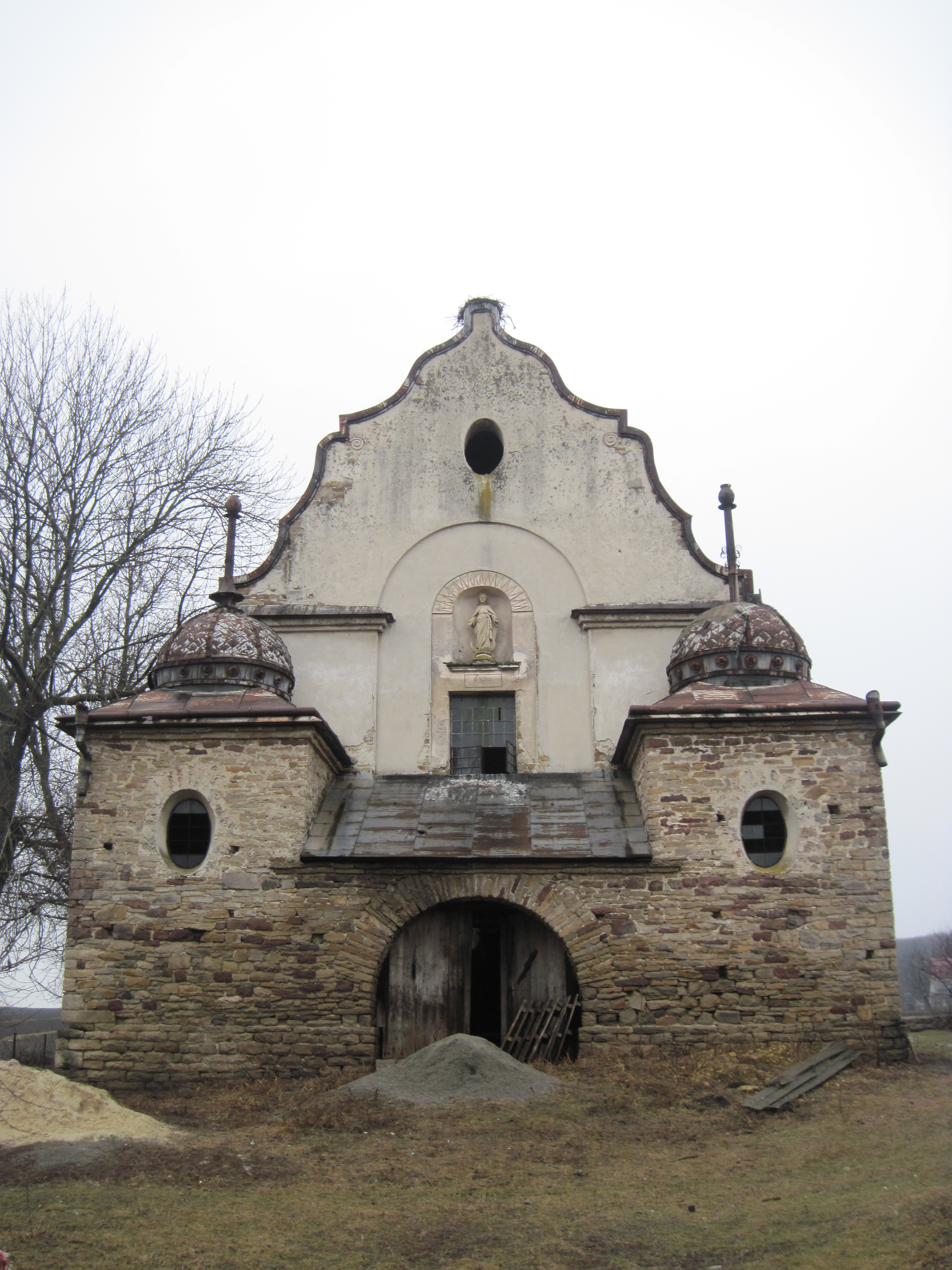
