= Zaryvyntsi =

Rural locality in Ternopil Oblast, Ukraine

Zaryvyntsi Заривинці
- Location in Ternopil Oblast
- Coordinates: 49°6′23″N 25°22′43″E
- Country: Ukraine
- Oblast: Ternopil Oblast
- Raion: Chortkiv Raion
- Hromada: Buchach urban hromada
- Time zone: UTC+2 (EET)
  - Summer (DST): UTC+3 (EEST)
- Postal code: 48475

Zaryvyntsi (Ukrainian: Заривинці) is a village in Buchach urban hromada, Chortkiv Raion, Ternopil Oblast, Ukraine.

== History ==
It was first mentioned in writings in 1373 (or 1379).

After the liquidation of the Buchach Raion on 19 July 2020, the village became part of the Chortkiv Raion.

== Religion ==
- Church of the Ascension (1828, OCU),
- Chapel of the Ascension (2010, UGCC).

== Sources ==
- (in Ukrainian) Матвіїв І., Яворський Г., Заривинці // Ternopil Encyclopedic Dictionary: in 4 v. / editorial board: H. Yavorskyi and other, Ternopil: "Zbruch", 2004, V. 1: А—Й, S. 620–621. — ISBN 966-528-197-6.
- "Żurawińce". Geographical Dictionary of the Kingdom of Poland (in Polish). 14. Warszawa: Kasa im. Józefa Mianowskiego. 1895. p. 860.
