= Brovari, Ternopil Oblast =

Brovari Броварі
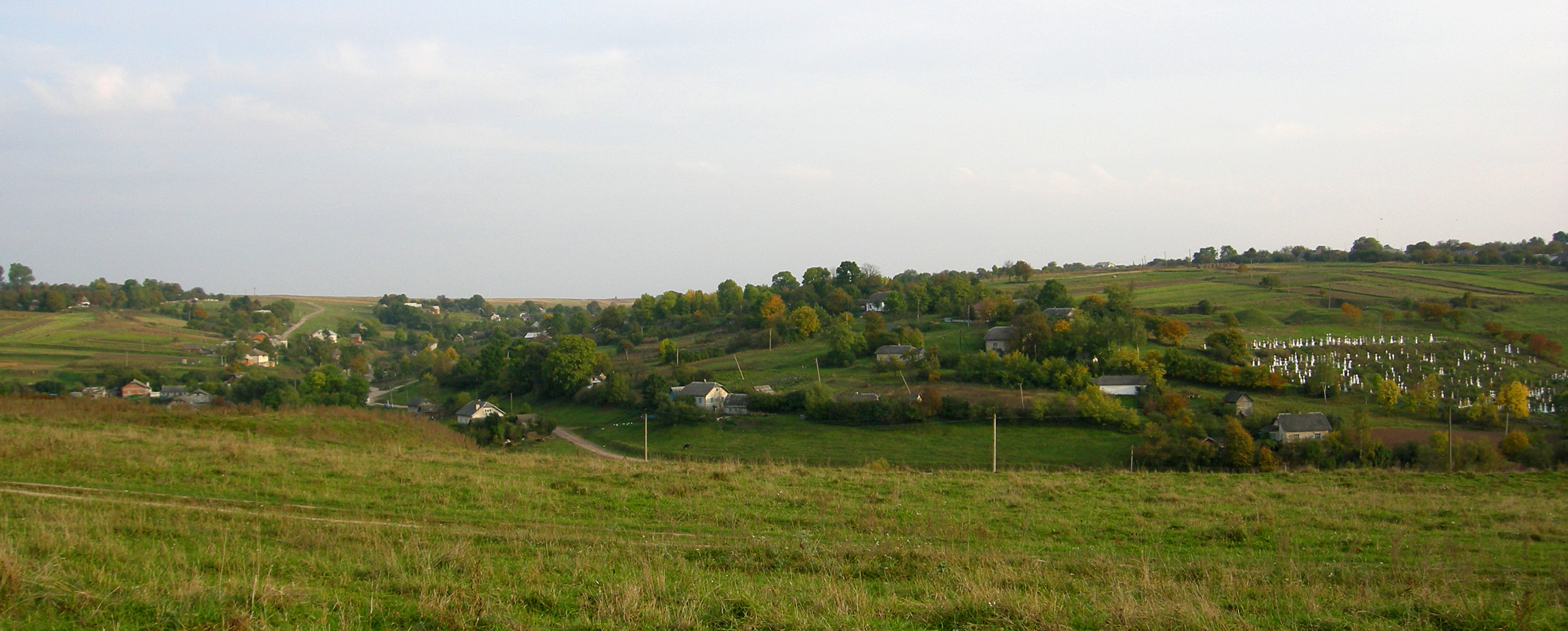
- Interactive map of Brovari
- Coordinates: 48°57′54″N 25°27′31″E
- Country: Ukraine
- Oblast: Ternopil Oblast
- Raion: Chortkiv Raion

Area
  - Total: 1.30 km^{2} (0.50 sq mi)

Population (2001 census)
  - Total: 362
  - Density: 27,846/km^{2} (72,120/sq mi)
- Time zone: UTC+2 (EET)
  - Summer (DST): UTC+3 (EEST)
- Postal code: 48467
- Area code: +380 3544

Brovari (Ukrainian: Броварі; Polish: Browary; Yiddish: בראָוואַר, romanized: Brovar) is a village in Chortkiv Raion (district) of Ternopil Oblast (province) in western Ukraine. It belongs to Buchach urban hromada, one of the hromadas of Ukraine. Small river Yazlovchyk (left tributary of the river Vilkhovets) flows near of the village.

== History ==
First written mention comes from the early 18th century. Then belonged to the Polish–Lithuanian Commonwealth, from 1772 until 1918 to Austrian (Habsburg monarchy, Austrian Empire, Austria-Hungary) empires, in 1918-1919 to West Ukrainian People's Republic. From 1991 belonged to Ukraine.

Reading room of Ukrainian society Prosvita operated in the village.

Until 18 July 2020, Brovari belonged to Buchach Raion. The raion was abolished in July 2020 as part of the administrative reform of Ukraine, which reduced the number of raions of Ternopil Oblast to three. The area of Buchach Raion was merged into Chortkiv Raion.

== Attractions ==
- Church of the Blessed Virgin Mary (1904)
- Chapel (reconstruction 1992)
- Statue of the Holy Virgin Mary (near church)
- Memory Cross after the abolition of serfdom

== Sources ==
- (in Ukrainian) П. Германович, В. Уніят, Броварі // Ternopil Encyclopedic Dictionary: in 4 v. / editorial board: H. Yavorskyi and other, Ternopil: "Zbruch", 2004, V. 1: А—Й, S. 188. — ISBN 966-528-197-6.
- "Browary". Geographical Dictionary of the Kingdom of Poland (in Polish). 1. Warszawa: Kasa im. Józefa Mianowskiego. 1880. p. 383.

.
