= Duliby, Ternopil Oblast =

Duliby Дуліби
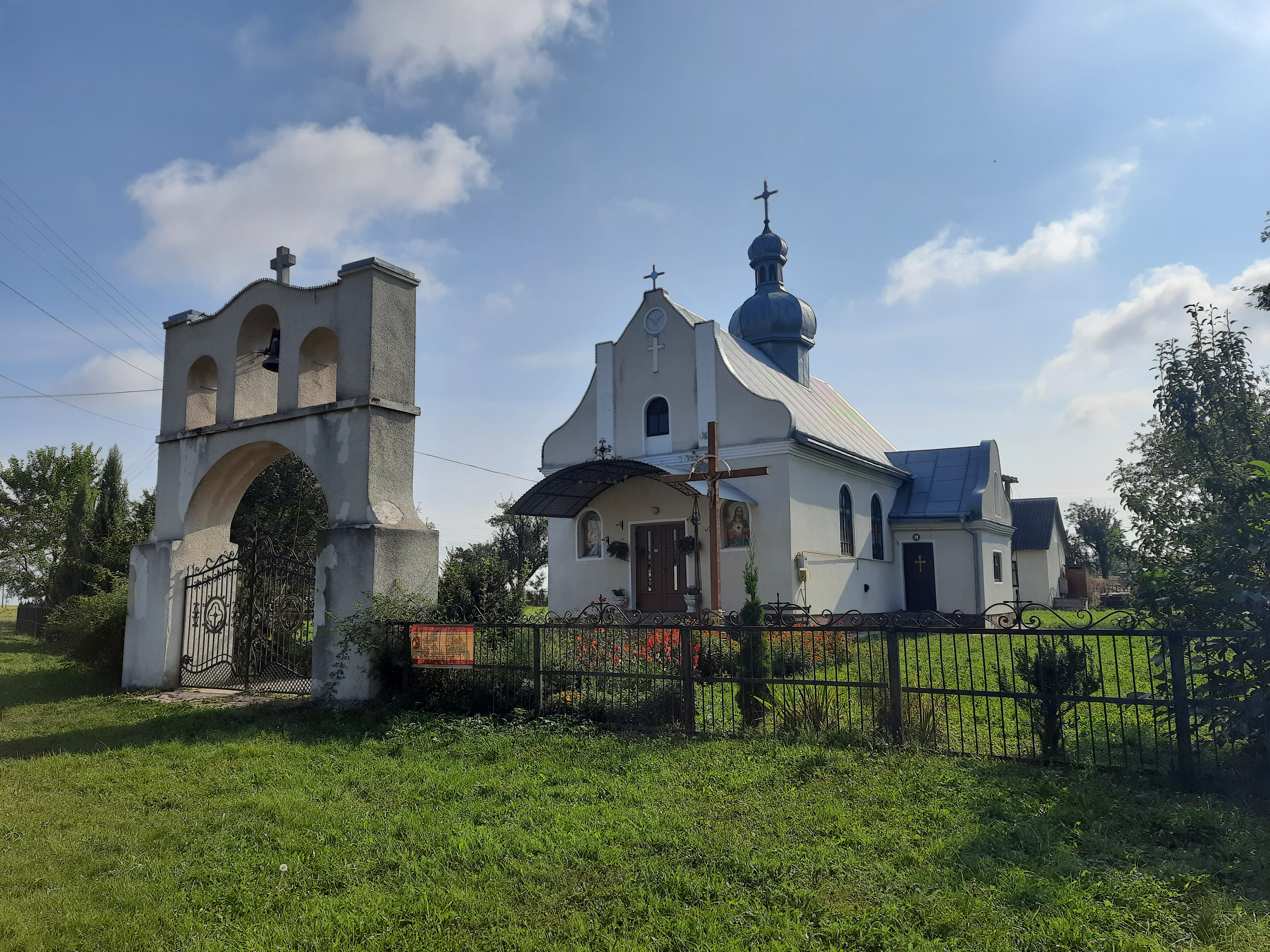
- Greek Catholic Church of Saint Demetrius
- Interactive map of Duliby
- Coordinates: 48°55′49″N 25°25′55″E
- Country: Ukraine
- Oblast: Ternopil Oblast
- Raion: Chortkiv Raion

Population (2001 census)
  - Total: 800
- Time zone: UTC+2 (EET)
  - Summer (DST): UTC+3 (EEST)
- Postal code: 48461
- Area code: +380 3544

Duliby (Ukrainian: Дуліби; Polish: Duliby) is a village in Chortkiv Raion (district) of Ternopil Oblast (province) in western Ukraine. It belongs to Buchach urban hromada, one of the hromadas of Ukraine. The village is located upon the Strypa river in the historical area of Galician Podolia.

== History ==
On 2 June 1919 troops of the Ukrainian Galician Army fought a victorious battle in the area.

Until 18 July 2020, Duliby belonged to Buchach Raion. The raion was abolished in July 2020 as part of the administrative reform of Ukraine, which reduced the number of raions of Ternopil Oblast to three. The area of Buchach Raion was merged into Chortkiv Raion.
