= Saint Nicholas Church, Bila, Ternopil Raion =

Church in Ternopil Oblast, Ukraine

Saint Nicholas Church
- Церква Святого Миколая
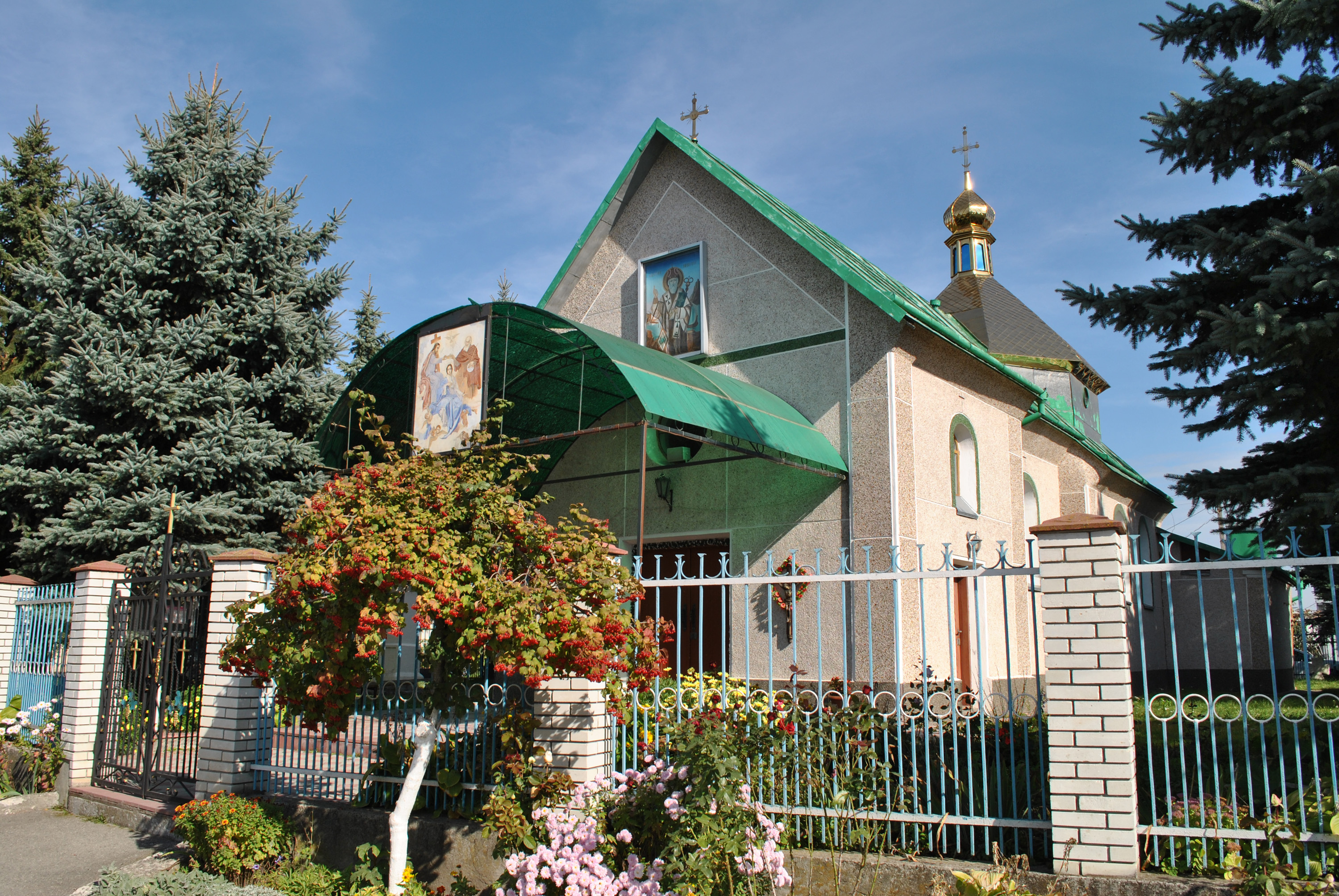

- Location within Ternopil Oblast

Religion
- Affiliation: Ukrainian Greek Catholic Church

Location
- Location: Bila, Bila rural hromada, Ternopil Raion, Ternopil Oblast, Ukraine
- Coordinates: 49°34′45″N 25°34′27″E

Architecture
- Completed: probably 1870

Saint Nicholas Church (Ukrainian: Церква Святого Миколая) is a Greek Catholic parish church (UGCC) in Bila of the Bila rural hromada, Ternopil Raion, Ternopil Oblast, and an architectural monument of local importance.

== History ==
The earliest archival information about St. Nicholas Church dates back to 1601.

In 1832–1842, the village of Bila had an independent parish. In 1844, St. Nicholas Church was a daughter church, in 1877 the church of Bila was already the mother church, and there were daughter churches in Chystyliv and Plotycha. During the ministry of at. Omelian Zastirzheshch, a porch was built.

At the turn of the XIX–XX centuries, the parish priest of Bila was at. Amvrosii Krushelnytskyi, the father of the singer Solomiya Krushelnytska. The last pre-war parish priest of the village was at. Yevhen Alyskevych, who was expelled and repressed by the Soviet authorities in 1939.

Under the pastor, at. Mykola Butrynskyi, the parish and the church were transferred to the Russian Orthodox Church in 1946. After 1960, the state authorities closed St. Nicholas Church and used it as a warehouse for the regional printing house.

For a long time, the Greek Catholic underground in Bila was associated with the ministry and life of the repressed underground priest, at. Volodymyr Telenko (1908–1992). A room in his house was an underground church. He baptized, married, confessed, and gave communion to 80 percent of the residents of Bila. At the end of 1989, on the feast of St. Nicholas, the first Divine Liturgy was celebrated by at. Telenko, the new parish priest of Bila, at. Vasyl Kozii, and two other underground priests, at. Vasyl Baran and at. Yevstakhii Smal.

The Church of St. Nicholas was opened in February 1989, when it was still undergoing renovation. On 12 December 1989, at the request of the parishioners and with the blessing of Bishop Volodymyr Sterniuk, at. Smal consecrated the renovated church and the altar.

In 1994, at. Vasyl Kozii consecrated a cross for the construction of a new church of the Intercession, and on the feast of the Intercession in 1995, at. Kozii consecrated a chapel on the site where the new church was to be built.

In 2004–2007, the church was restored inside and out. It was painted by the famous iconographer Taras Hatala. On 19 December 2007, the then Bishop (now Metropolitan) Vasyl Semeniuk, together with the community, consecrated the throne and the restored church.

== Bell tower ==
An architectural monument of local importance. In 1995, at. Smal and the community opened a new bell tower near St. Nicholas Church.

== Parish ==
About 600 people belong to the parish. The parish owns a church and a spiritual and youth center.

The senior brother is Volodymyr Pihan. Catechesis is conducted by Oksana Hlynska.

The parish has the Pope's Worldwide Prayer Network, the Mothers in Prayer community, the Altar and Sodality of Our Lady wives. All meetings of the catechetical groups take place in the Spiritual Youth Center, which is specially designed for catechesis.

== Priests ==
- at. Ivan Dolinskyi (1844, priest)
- at. Omelian Zastirzheshch (1877, administrator)
- at. Amvrosii Krushelnytskyi (at the turn of the XIX-XX centuries)
- at. Ivan Koliankivskyi (1903–1937)
- at. Yevhen Alyskevych (1937–1941)
- at. Mykola Butrynskyi (1941–1954, During his ministry, the church was transferred to the ROC in 1946)
- at. Melnyk (1955–1960)
- at. Volodymyr Telenko (served underground for a long time)
- at. Yevstakhii Smal (at the end of the 1990s)
- at. Mitrat Roman Hrydzhuk (from August 1996)

== Sources ==
- "Biała (5), wś, pow. tarnopolski". Geographical Dictionary of the Kingdom of Poland (in Polish). 1. Warszawa: Kasa im. Józefa Mianowskiego. 1880. p. 171.
