= Hanna Krushelnytska =

Ukrainian soprano singer (1887–1965)

- Ганна Амвросіївна Крушельницька
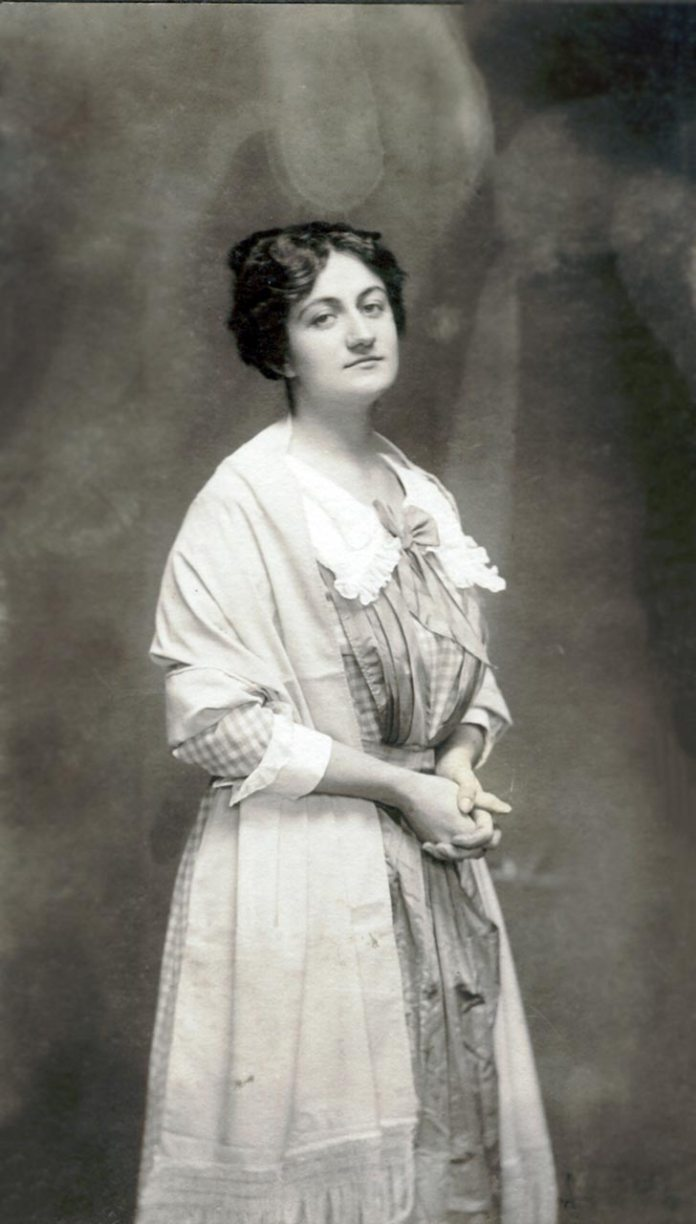
- Anna Krushelnytska as Mimi in Giacomo Puccini's opera La Bohème
- Born: 18 August 1887; Bila, now Ternopil Raion, Ternopil Oblast, Ukraine
- Died: 13 May 1965 (aged 77); Lviv
- Education: Lviv Higher Music Institute, Milan Conservatory
- Occupations: Opera and concert singer (soprano)

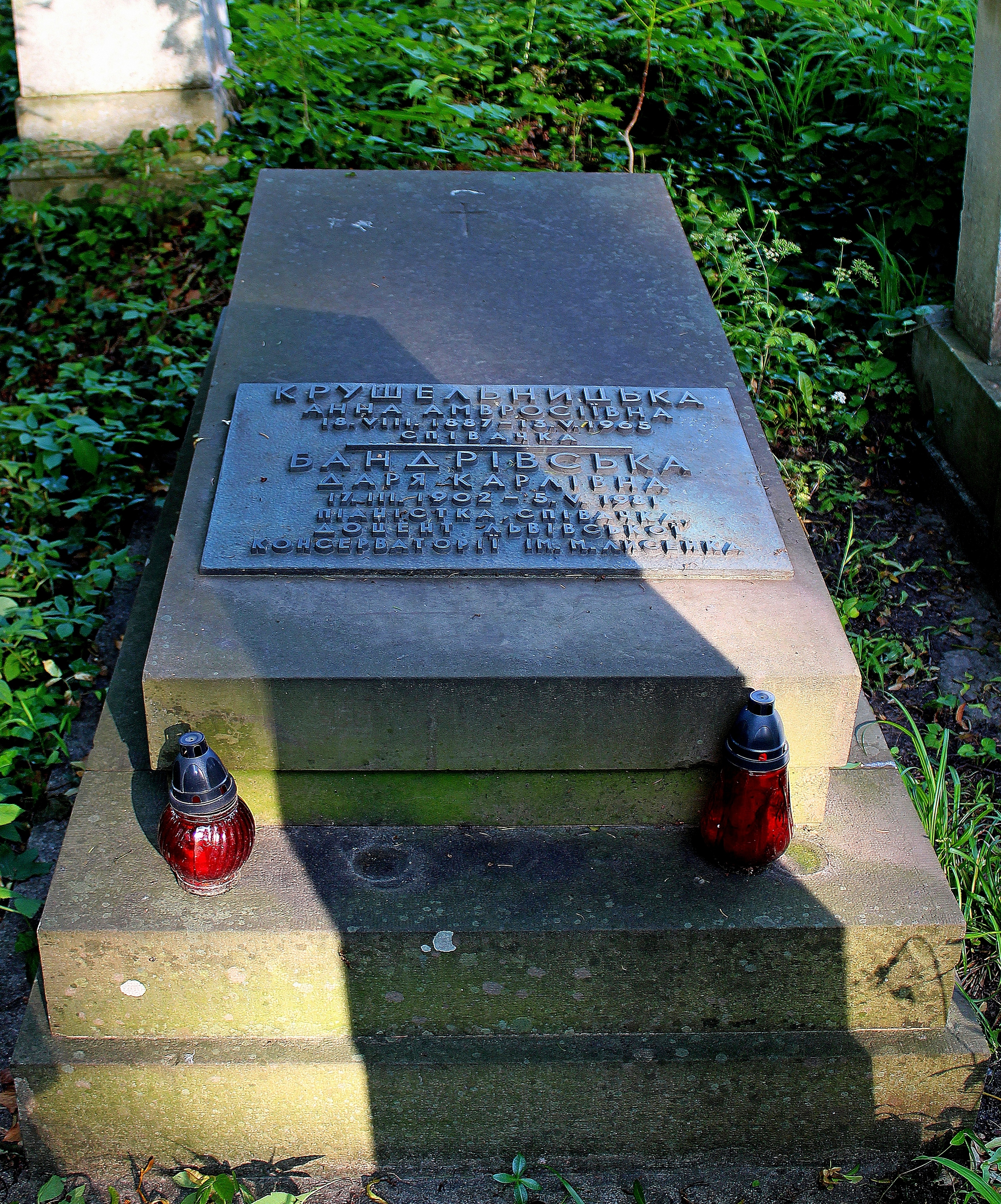
The grave of Hanna Krushelnytska in section 4 of Lychakiv Cemetery in Lviv

Hanna Krushelnytska of the Sas coat of arms (Ukrainian: Ганна Амвросіївна Крушельницька; 18 August 1887 – 13 May 1965) was a Ukrainian opera and concert singer (soprano). Sister of Solomiya Krushelnytska.

== Biography ==
His father, Amvrosii Krushelnytskyi, was a Greek Catholic priest and public figure. His mother, Teodora-Mariia Savchynska, was the daughter of priest and writer Hryhorii Savchynskyi. His godfather was Oleksandr Barvinsky, a public and political figure in Galicia, historian, and educator.

She graduated from the Lviv Higher Music Institute (1904) and the Milan Conservatory (1912). From 1907 to 1914, she sang on opera stages in Warsaw, Lviv, Milan, Venice, Rome, and elsewhere.

From 1914 to 1928, she also performed as a concert singer. She took part in anniversary concerts dedicated to Taras Shevchenko (1901–1906), Mykola Lysenko (1903), and Ivan Franko (1913) in Lviv.

As a result of the stress she experienced, she was treated for a nervous disorder with the help of her sister Solomiya. After World War I, she returned to Galicia. On 8 May 1922, together with singer Odarka Bandrivska and composer Vasyl Barvinsky, she performed in a concert, the proceeds of which were donated to Ukrainian people with disabilities.

In 1928, she left the stage. She performed for the last time in Hrebeniv. During the Soviet era, she lived in a house at 23 Chernyshevskoho Street.

She is buried in Lviv, in section 4 of the Lychakiv Cemetery.

== Creativity, repertoire ==
She had a "cello" timbre and extensive vocal training.

=== Opera roles ===
- Natalka, Marusia (Natalka Poltavka, Black Sea Cossacks by Mykola Lysenko),
- Oksana (Zaporozhets za Dunayem by Semen Hulak-Artemovskyi),
- Irys (Irys by Pietro Mascagni),
- Sieglinde, Elisabeth (Die Walküre, Tannhäuser by Richard Wagner),
- Micaëla (Carmen by Georges Bizet),
- Mimi (La Bohème by Giacomo Puccini).

=== Concert repertoire ===
She performed works by Giuseppe Verdi, Giacomo Puccini, Richard Wagner, Vasyl Barvinsky, Mykola Lysenko, Stanislav Lyudkevych, Ostap Nyzhankivsky, and Denys Sichinskyi.

=== Records ===
She recorded three Ukrainian songs on gramophone records: "Z moho tyazhkogo boliu", "Oi misiatsiu, misiachenku", and "Shyroky list na dubochku" (Lviv, Gramophone, 1904, 1905).

== Bibliography ==
- Krushelnytska Hanna Amvrosiivna / B. M. Filts // Encyclopedia of Modern Ukraine [Online] / Eds. : I.М. Dziuba, A.I. Zhukovsky, M.H. Zhelezniak [et al.]; National Academy of Sciences of Ukraine, Shevchenko Scientific Society. – Kyiv: The NASU institute of Encyclopedic Research, 2014.
- Крушельницька Ганна Амвросіївна // Українська музична енциклопедія. У 2 т. Т. 2. [Е – К] / гол. редкол. Г. Скрипник. — Київ : Видавництво Інституту мистецтвознавства, фольклористики та етнології НАН України, 2008. — С. 623.
- (in Ukrainian) Медведик П., Крушельницька Ганна Амвросіївна // Ternopil Encyclopedic Dictionary: in 4 v. / editorial board: H. Yavorskyi and other, Ternopil: "Zbruch", 2005, V. 2: К—О, S. 253. — ISBN 966-528-199-2.
- Крушельницькі / Українські родоводи // Галицька брама. — Львів, No. 9 за грудень 1995. — С. 8–9.
- Лисенко Іван. Словник співаків України. — Київ, 1997. — С. 158.
- Медведик П. Славетна сестра великої Соломії // Жовтень. — 1982. — Ч. 9.
- Митці України. — Київ, 1992. — С. 338;
