= Leon Schagrin =

American lawyer

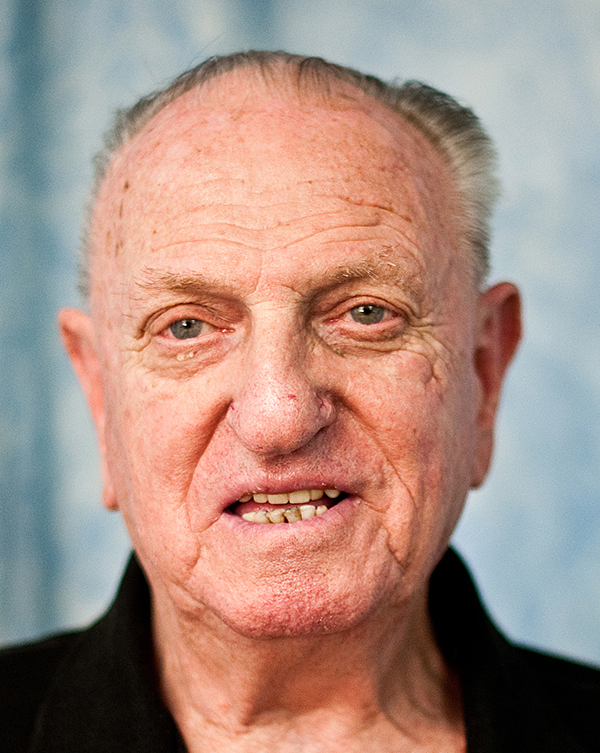
- Born: October 30, 1926 (age 99)
- Occupation: Co-founder of the Holocaust Survivors of South Florida organization

Leon Schagrin (born October 30, 1926) is a Holocaust survivor and Jewish advocate in the State of Florida. He is also a co-founder of the Holocaust Survivors of South Florida organization.

== Early life ==
Leon Schagrin was in born on October 30, 1926 in the town of Grybów, Poland. In 1941 he was captured by the Nazi army and sent to a succession of different concentration camps and ghettos. In 1942 Schagrin's parents, four sisters, and brother were sent to the Belzec extermination camp, where they were subsequently killed. Schagrin said he was the only one of his close family not taken to the camp.

== Holocaust survivor advocacy ==
In 1982 Schagrin co-found the Holocaust Survivors of South Florida organization. The Sun-Sentinel interviewed Schagrin several times in the late 1980s as a Jewish survivor of the Auschwitz death camp and member of the group. In 1987, Schagrin was interviewed following the group's hosting of an exhibition tracing anti-semitism from the Middle Ages through the 20th Century. In 1988 Schagrin was then interviewed after meeting with Elie Wiesel at an event at the Soref Jewish Community Center in Fort Lauderdale, Florida. In 1991 he was then interviewed regarding the rise of pro-Nazi underground video games. In 1993 he was interviewed by the Miami Herald regarding potential US involvement in the Bosnian War, stating that any unilateral action by the US would not be effective.

Schagrin has been the feature of several stories about his reconnecting with fellow prisoners he knew during his time spent in the Nazi concentration camps. He himself was discovered by Moses Katz, a man with whom he had been placed in four successive, different camps with by the Germans between 1941 and 1945, after Katz overheared a conversation in a New York City airport in 1965 that mentioned the town where Schagrin was originally from. In the early 1990s, Schagrin and Katz themselves took the reins of the Holocaust Survivors of South Florida, of which Schagrin was a long-time member. Schagrin also reconnected with the sole surviving member of his extended family after 70 years, his cousin Leo Adler, who discovered Schagrin after being given a copy of Schagrin's memoir, a book about Schagrin's life called The Horse Adjutant: A Boy's Life in the Holocaust co-authored by Stephen Shooster.

== Reinstitution of German reparations ==
Schagrin was turned down by the German government for compensation following the war, and fought for nearly forty years to receive monetary compensation from the Germans for his treatment during the genocide, though the compensation approved was fairly insubstantial due to inflation. He fought over four decades to get the German government to open compensation to affected victims that the post-Nazi government had tried to limit by unreasonable deadlines. The final compensation delivered by the German government was, "The agreement between the German Finance Ministry and the Conference on Jewish Material Claims Against Germany was announced Friday in New York. It will provide monthly payments of about $315, starting in 1995, to Jews who were confined in concentration camps for at least six months, in ghettos for at least 18 months, or who were forced to live in hiding for at least 18 months."

== Personal life ==
Schagrin is married to Betty Sternlicht, after in Israel following the end of World War II. Sternlicht had survived the Holocaust, alongside her two sisters, with the help of Oskar Schindler. They chose not to have children.
