= P39 =

P39 or P-39 may refer to:

- Bell P-39 Airacobra, an American fighter aircraft
- HMS P39, a submarine of the Royal Navy
- P39 road (Ukraine)
- Papyrus 39, a biblical manuscript
- Phosphorus-39, an isotope of phosphorus
- Pier 39
- Transcription factor Jun, the Fos-binding protein p39
- P39, a Latvian state regional road
