= Barysh (disambiguation) =

Barysh may refer to:

- Barysh, town in Russia
- Barysh (Dniester tributary), river in Ukraine
- Barysh (river), river in Russia
- Barysh (village), village in Chortkiv Raion, Ternopil Oblast, Ukraine
