= Bila rural hromada =

Rural hromada in Ternopil Oblast, Ukraine

Bila rural hromada Білецька сільська громада
- hromada
- Location within Ternopil Oblast Location within Ukraine
- Coordinates: 49°35′3″N 25°34′41″E
- Country: Ukraine
- Oblast: Ternopil Oblast
- Raion: Ternopil Raion
- Administrative center: Bila

Government
  - Hromada head: Dmytro Malyk

Area
  - Total: 138.1 km^{2} (53.3 sq mi)

Population (2022)
  - Total: 10,735
- Villages: 10
- Website: bilecka-gromada.gov.ua

Bila rural territorial hromada (Ukrainian: Білецька територіальна громада, romanized: Biletska silska terytorialna hromada) is a hromada in Ukraine, in Ternopil Raion of Ternopil Oblast. The administrative center is the village of Bila. Its population is 10,735 (2022 estimate)

It was formed on 25 July 2018 by amalgamation of Bila, Velykyi Hlybochok, Ivachiv Dolishnyi, Ihorovytsia, Plotycha, Chystyliv rural councils of Ternopil Raion.

== Settlements ==
The hromada consists of 10 villages:

- Bila
- Velykyi Hlybochok
- Ditkivtsi
- Ivachiv Horishnii
- Ivachiv Dolishnii
- Ihrovytsia
- Mshanets
- Plotycha
- Khomivka
- Chystyliv
