= Ozeriany, Buchach urban hromada, Chortkiv Raion, Ternopil Oblast =

Rural locality in Ternopil Oblast, Ukraine

Ozeriany Озеряни
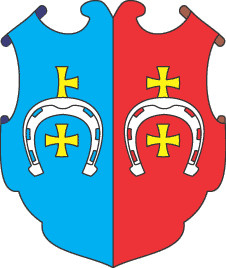
- Coat of arms

- Location in Ternopil Oblast
- Coordinates: 49°5′4″N 25°17′17″E
- Country: Ukraine
- Oblast: Ternopil Oblast
- Raion: Chortkiv Raion
- Hromada: Buchach Hromada
- Time zone: UTC+2 (EET)
  - Summer (DST): UTC+3 (EEST)
- Postal code: 48422

Ozeriany (Ukrainian: Озеряни) is a village in Buchach urban hromada, Chortkiv Raion, Ternopil Oblast, Ukraine.

== History ==
The first written mention of the village is from 1469.

== Religion ==
- There are two churches of Saint Michael (built in 1913, 2002)

== Notable residents ==
- Amvrosii Krushelnytskyi (1841–1902), Ukrainian Greek Catholic priest, public figure, choral conductor, father of the singer Solomiya Krushelnytska
