= Amvrosii Krushelnytskyi =

Ukrainian Greek Catholic priest and public figure

- Амвросій Крушельницький
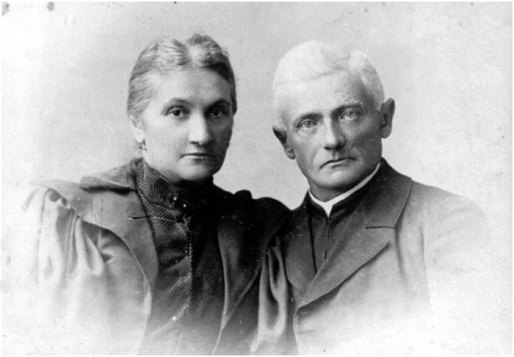
- Born: Amvrosii Vasylovych Krushelnytskyi; 7 January 1841; Ozeriany, now Chortkiv Raion, Ternopil Oblast, Ukraine
- Died: 31 December 1902 (aged 61); Bila, now Ternopil Raion, Ternopil Oblast, Ukraine
- Education: Lviv Theological Seminary

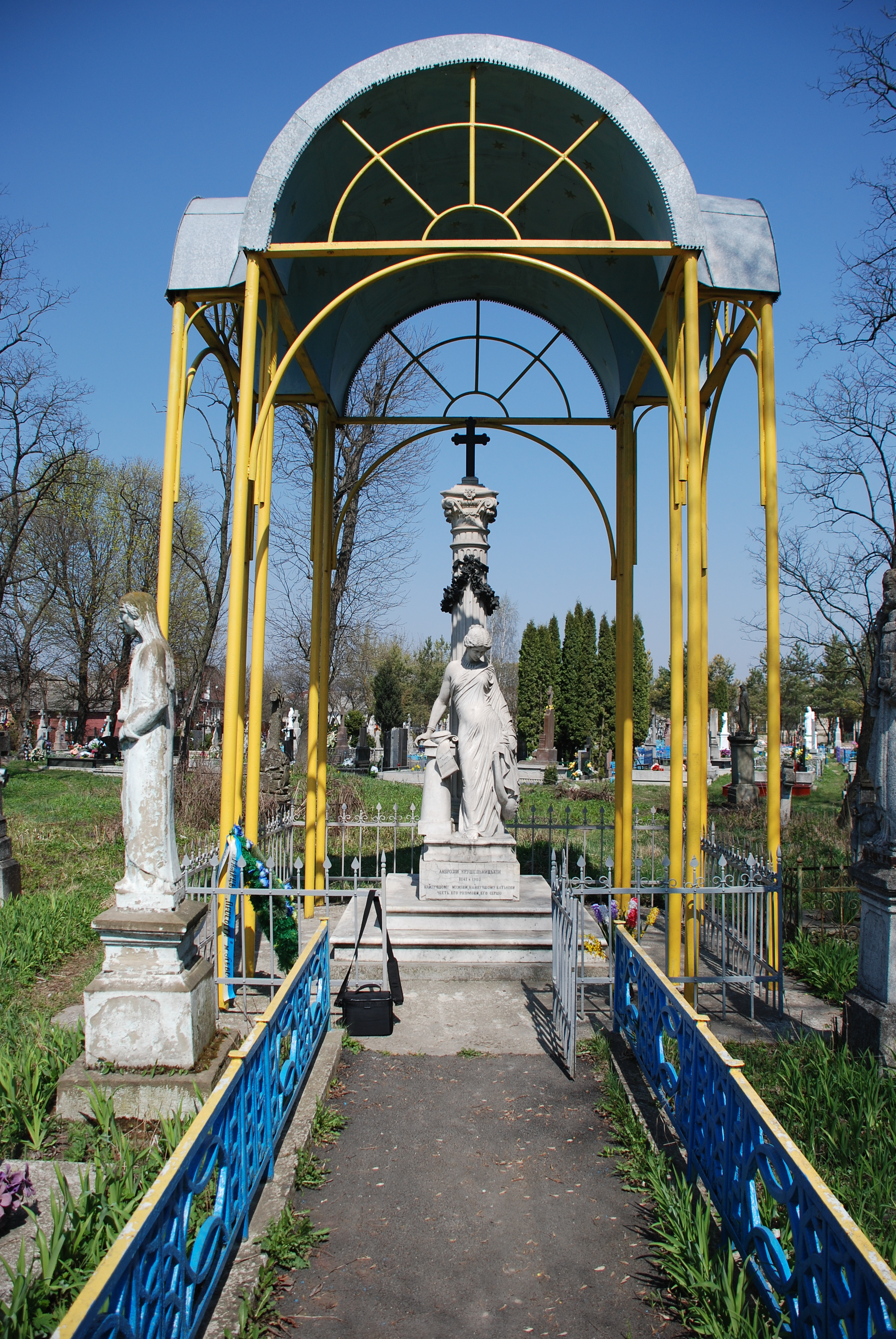
Tombstone, Bila. Photo taken on April 17, 2009

Amvrosii Vasylovych Krushelnytskyi coat of arms of Sas (Ukrainian: Амвросій Васильович Крушельницький; 7 January 1841 in Ozeriany, now Chortkiv Raion, Ternopil Oblast – 31 December 1902 in Bila, now Ternopil Raion) was a Ukrainian Greek Catholic priest, public figure, and choral conductor. He was the father of Solomiya, Hanna, Anton, Emilia, Osypa Krushelnytskyi and son-in-law of the UGCC priest and writer Hryhorii Savchynskyi.

== Biography ==
Adam Boniecki claimed that Amvrosii Krushelnytskyi had a brother in law, Ivan (1830–1902), a Greek Catholic priest of Stara Yahilnytsia.

Krushelnytskyi graduated from the Buchach Gymnasium at the Basilian Fathers' Monastery and the Lviv Theological Seminary (1872).

Served as a parish priest in the villages of Ozeriany, Soroky, Biliavyntsi, Stari Petlykivtsi, Osivtsi, and Bila, where he led choirs and amateur theaters.

He played the violin and piano. At anniversary concerts, he conducted the choir of the Ruska Besida Society in Ternopil. He was friends with Ivan Franko, corresponded with Mykhailo Pavlyk and other progressive cultural and educational figures. Because of this, he had an unfavorable attitude of some of the then leaders of the UGCC.

Krushelnytskyi promoted the intellectual and musical development of children. In 1903, an artistic monument of white marble was erected on his grave in the village of Bila, which was brought from Florence at the expense of his daughter Solomiya; the epitaph reads: "To the best husband, the best father, honor to his mind, honor to his heart".
