= Khomivka, Ternopil Oblast =

Rural locality in Ternopil Oblast, Ukraine

Khomivka Хомівка
- Location in Ternopil Oblast
- Coordinates: 49°43′24″N 25°31′54″E
- Country: Ukraine
- Oblast: Ternopil Oblast
- Raion: Ternopil Raion
- Hromada: Bila rural hromada
- Time zone: UTC+2 (EET)
  - Summer (DST): UTC+3 (EEST)
- Postal code: 47235

Khomivka (Ukrainian: Хомівка) is a village in Bila rural hromada, Ternopil Raion, Ternopil Oblast, Ukraine.

== History ==
The first written mention of the village was in 1705.

After the liquidation of the Zboriv Raion on 19 July 2020, the village became part of the Ternopil Raion.

== Religion ==
- Saint Demetrius church (1989, brick).

== Sources ==
- (in Ukrainian) Ханас В., Хомівка // Ternopil Encyclopedic Dictionary: in 4 v. / editorial board: H. Yavorskyi and other, Ternopil: "Zbruch", 2008, V. 3: П—Я, S. 556. — ISBN 978-966-528-279-2.
