= Ivachiv Dolishnii =

Rural locality in Ternopil Oblast, Ukraine

Ivachiv Dolishnii Івачів Долішній
- Location in Ternopil Oblast
- Coordinates: 49°38′45″N 25°32′54″E
- Country: Ukraine
- Oblast: Ternopil Oblast
- Raion: Ternopil Raion
- Hromada: Bila rural hromada
- Time zone: UTC+2 (EET)
  - Summer (DST): UTC+3 (EEST)
- Postal code: 47704

Ivachiv Dolishnii (Ukrainian: Івачів Долішній) is a village in Bila rural hromada, Ternopil Raion, Ternopil Oblast, Ukraine.

== History ==
The first written mention of the village was in 1463.

== Religion ==
- Church of the Holy Apostle and Evangelist Luke (UGCC, 1859, completed in 1867–1870; brick).

== Famous people ==
The village was visited by writer, publicist, and teacher Ivanna Blazhkevych, and lawyer and public and political activist Dmytro Ladyka, among others.

== Sources ==
- (in Ukrainian) Тимочко П., Івачів Долішній // Ternopil Encyclopedic Dictionary: in 4 v. / editorial board: H. Yavorskyi and other, Ternopil: "Zbruch", 2004, V. 1: А—Й, S. 673. — ISBN 966-528-197-6.
- "Iwaczów Dolny". Geographical Dictionary of the Kingdom of Poland (in Polish). 3. Warszawa: Kasa im. Józefa Mianowskiego. 1882. p. 309.
