= Zynoviy Kovalyk =

Ukrainian Greek Catholic priest and martyr (1903–1941)

Zynoviy Kovalyk (Ukrainian: Зиновій Ковалик – sometimes spelled Zenon or Zenobius; 18 August 1903 – 1941) was a Ukrainian Greek Catholic Redemptorist priest and martyr.

== Family background ==
Zynoviy Kovalyk was born in the village of Ivachiv Horishnii, near Ternopil in Austrian Galicia (modern-day western Ukraine). His family were peasant workers and were devout Christians. He was known to have a good singing voice, a joyful temperament, and to be a person of strong character. Zynoviy developed a vocation to the Catholic priesthood while he was still young.

== Ministry as a Redemptorist ==
After teaching in a primary school for a short period, he entered the novitiate of the Redemptorists (Congregation of the Holy Redeemer). He was 25 years old, older than most novices of that period. He made his first religious profession on 26 August 1926.

After the novitiate, he studied philosophy and theology in Belgium. He returned to Ukraine and was ordained a priest on 9 August 1932, celebrating his first Liturgy in his village of Ivachiv on 4 September 1932.

Kovalyk then travelled with Bishop Nicholas Charnetsky (who was also to become a martyr) to Volhynia to work amongst the Ukrainians of the Eastern Orthodox Church in order to promote ecumenism. Kovalyk was a good singer and a preacher. It is said he had a golden voice, and that his preaching drew thousands of people and led them to a greater devotion to Jesus and Mary. After several years he went to Stanislaviv (today Ivano-Frankivsk) to take up the post of provincial bursar, while being also very engaged in the traditional Redemptorist practice of conducting missions throughout the area.

Immediately before the Soviet invasion of 1939 he traveled to the Redemptorist monastery in Lviv and assumed the position of bursar. Due to the Communist presence many clergy concentrated on spiritual matters when they gave a homily and avoided issues of freedom and justice. As a preacher, Kovalyk showed no reluctance to publicly condemn the ideology and atheist customs then being introduced by the Soviets, and to preach on matters affecting the everyday lives of the people. Even though he was warned by his friends that the Communist authorities were suspicious of him and that he should be less vocal, he is said to have replied, "If it is God's will, I am ready to die, but I cannot be quiet in the face of such injustice." On the feast of the Dormition of the Mother of God, 15 August 1940, he gave a homily which reportedly drew some ten thousand faithful.

== Arrest and death ==
On 20 December 1940, the Soviet secret police took Kovalyk from his monastery on account of the sermon he had preached on the Feast of the Immaculate Conception (8 December). He was accused of being a spy. For the six months of his incarceration at Brygidki prison, like many others, he was subjected to interrogation and torture. In prison, he continued his ministry by praying with the other prisoners, hearing confessions, giving spiritual exercises, teaching catechism classes, and comforting them with religious tales and stories from the Bible.

On 22 June 1941, German troops began their offensive against the Soviet Union and the city of Lviv fell seven days later. As the German army advanced, the Soviets guards executed 7,000 prisoners prior to retreat. Witnesses claim that, rather than simply shooting Kovalyk, he was crucified on a corridor wall of the prison, his stomach ripped open and a dead human foetus inserted. Official Soviet statements claim that Kovalyk was shot and not crucified.

On 24 April 2001, along with several other Redemptorists, Kovalyk was recognised by the Holy See as being a martyr. He was beatified by Pope John Paul II on 27 June 2001 during the pope's pastoral visit to Ukraine. 27 June is the feast of Our Lady of Perpetual Help, patroness of the Redemptorists.

== Legacy ==
In his memoirs, Yaroslav Levytskyi recounts Kovalyk's sermons and the risk they invoked. '[His] sermons made an incredible impression on his listeners. But in the prevailing system of denunciations and terror this was very dangerous for a preacher. So I often tried to convince Father Kovalyk... that [he] needed to be more careful about the content of his sermons, that he shouldn't provoke the Bolsheviks, because here was a question of his own safety. But it was all in vain. Fathey Kovalyk only had one answer:"If that is God's will, I will gladly accept death, but as a preacher I will never act against my conscience."'

== Other sources ==
- Biographies of twenty five Greek-Catholic Servants of God at the website of the Vatican
- Beatification of the Servants of God on June 27, 2001 at the website of the Ukrainian Greek Catholic Church
- Francisco Radecki. Tumultuous Times: The Twenty General Councils of the Catholic Church and Vatican II and Its Aftermath. St. Joseph's Media, 2004.
- Blessed Zenon Kovalyk Patron Saints Index.
- Ökumenische Heiligenlexikon
