= Ihrovytsia =

Rural locality in Ternopil Oblast, Ukraine

Ihrovytsia Ігровиця
- Location in Ternopil Oblast
- Coordinates: 49°41′14″N 25°32′35″E
- Country: Ukraine
- Oblast: Ternopil Oblast
- Raion: Ternopil Raion
- Hromada: Bila rural hromada
- Time zone: UTC+2 (EET)
  - Summer (DST): UTC+3 (EEST)
- Postal code: 47701

Ihrovytsia (Ukrainian: Ігровиця) is a village in Bila rural hromada, Ternopil Raion, Ternopil Oblast, Ukraine.

== History ==
It is known from the late 16th century.

== Religion ==
- Church of St. Paraskeva Ternovska (1886–1888, brick, UGCC),
- Church of the Transfiguration (rebuilt in the late 1980s from a Roman Catholic church (second half of the 19th century, OCU).

== Sources ==
- (in Ukrainian) Ткач П., Уніят В., Ханас В., Ігровиця // Ternopil Encyclopedic Dictionary: in 4 v. / editorial board: H. Yavorskyi and other, Ternopil: "Zbruch", 2004, V. 1: А—Й, 696 s. — ISBN 966-528-197-6.
- "Ihrowice". Geographical Dictionary of the Kingdom of Poland (in Polish). 3. Warszawa: Kasa im. Józefa Mianowskiego. 1882. p. 249.
