= Ditkivtsi, Ternopil Oblast =

Rural locality in Ternopil Oblast, Ukraine

Ditkivtsi Дітківці
- Location in Ternopil Oblast
- Coordinates: 49°44′32″N 25°30′28″E
- Country: Ukraine
- Oblast: Ternopil Oblast
- Raion: Ternopil Raion
- Hromada: Bila rural hromada
- Time zone: UTC+2 (EET)
  - Summer (DST): UTC+3 (EEST)
- Postal code: 47235

Ditkivtsi (Ukrainian: Дітківці) is a village in Bila rural hromada, Ternopil Raion, Ternopil Oblast, Ukraine.

== History ==
The first written mention of the village was in 1670.

After the liquidation of the Zboriv Raion on 19 July 2020, the village became part of the Ternopil Raion.

== Religion ==
- Church of the Intercession (1904).

== Sources ==
- "Dytkowce". Geographical Dictionary of the Kingdom of Poland (in Polish). 2. Warszawa: Kasa im. Józefa Mianowskiego. 1881. p. 258.
