= Barysh (Dniester tributary) =

River in Ternopil Oblast, Ukraine

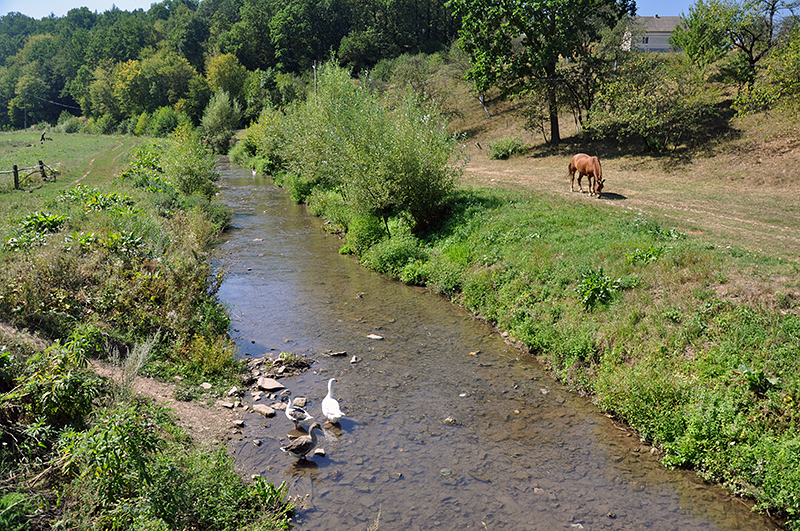
- Barysh River in Porokhova
- Native name: Бариш (Ukrainian)

Location
- Country: Ukraine

Physical characteristics
- Source
  - location: near Ozeriany
  - coordinates: 49°05′56″N 25°15′10″E
- Mouth: Dniester
  - coordinates: 48°51′57″N 25°16′12″E
- Length: 38 km (24 mi)

Basin features
- Progression: Dniester→ Dniester Estuary→ Black Sea

Barysh (Ukrainian: Бариш) is a river in Ukraine, which flows within the Chortkiv Raion of Ternopil Oblast. Left tributary of the river Dniester from the Black Sea basin.

Length 38 km, basin area 186 km^{2}. It originates on the northern slopes of the Podolian Upland, near the village of Ozeriany, Chortkiv Raion.

== Sources ==
- Каталог річок України. — К. : — Видавництво АН УРСР, 1957.
- Географічна енциклопедія України : [у 3 т.] / редкол.: О. М. Маринич (відповід. ред.) та ін. — К., 1989–1993. — 33 000 екз. — ISBN 5-88500-015-8.
