= Grybów =

Town in Lesser Poland Voivodeship, Poland

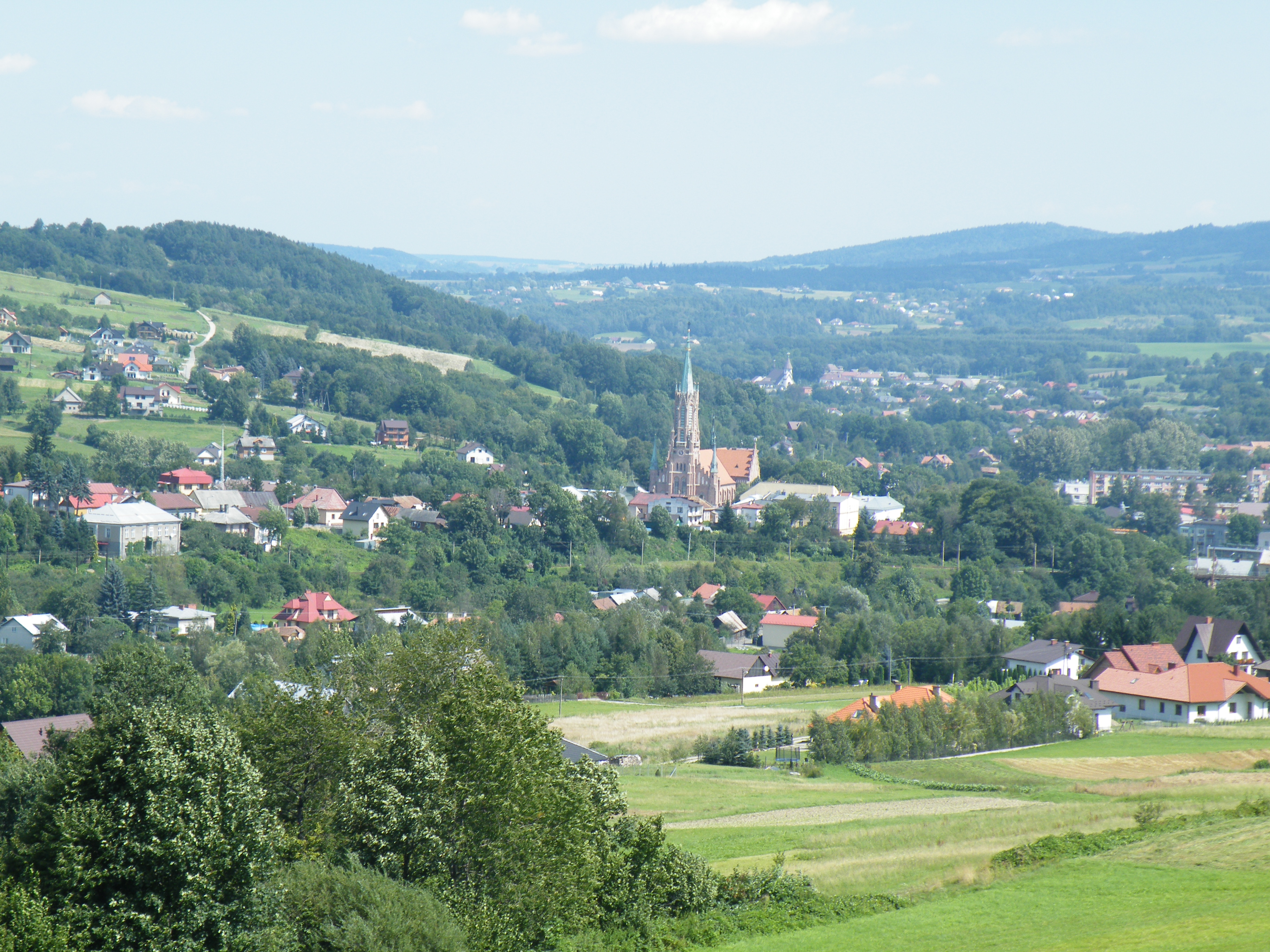
- Town skyline

- Coat of arms

- Location within Poland
- Coordinates: 49°37′28″N 20°56′54″E
- Country: Poland
- Voivodeship: Lesser Poland
- County: Nowy Sącz
- Gmina: Grybów (urban gmina)
- Town rights: 1340

Government
  - Mayor: Paweł Fyda

Area
  - Total: 17 km^{2} (6.6 sq mi)

Population (2006)
  - Total: 6,025
  - Density: 350/km^{2} (920/sq mi)
- Time zone: UTC+1 (CET)
  - Summer (DST): UTC+2 (CEST)
- Postal code: 33-330
- Car plates: KNS
- Website: https://www.grybow.pl

Grybów (Note: Polish pronunciation: [ˈɡrɨbuf]; Rusyn: Грибов, Hrybov; Yiddish: גריבאוו, Gribuv) is a town in the Nowy Sącz County, in Lesser Poland Voivodeship, in southern Poland, with 12,409 inhabitants (2005). It is located in the heartland of the Doły Jasielsko Sanockie (Doły Pits), and its average altitude is 370 metres above sea level, although there are some hills located within the confines of the city, Grybów has the steepest town square in medieval Europe.

== History ==
=== Middle Ages to 18th century ===
The history of Grybów dates back to the Middle Ages, when the early settlement belonged to the Castellan of Biecz, under King Casimir III the Great of the Piast dynasty. Following the destruction caused by the Mongol invasion, a new town charter modeled on the Magdeburg law was issued by Casimir on 15 May 1340 to Hanko Bogacz, a local burgher. The new town centre was erected on a hill at the site of former Biała village. The new town attracted settlers from Silesia and Saxony (see Walddeutsche), who called the town Grynberg.

Due to convenient location and several royal privileges, Grybów prospered and became a center of local trade and cloth manufacturing. In the period known as Polish Golden Age, Grybów had a renowned school of sculptors, in which the figure of Madonna of Kruzlowa was made. During the catastrophic Swedish invasion of Poland (1655-1660) Grybów was captured by the Swedish forces, who looted the town, and then set it on fire, together with ancient parish church and nearby castle. The Swedish raid was followed by a Transylvanian invasion of 1657, which brought further destruction upon the town. Furthermore, there were frequent fires and outbreaks of the plague, and by the late 17th century, Grybów turned into a small, poor town. In the summer of 1768, the area of the town witnessed Polish-Russian skirmishes, during the Bar Confederation revolt.

=== 19th century ===
Following the First Partition of Poland in 1772 until 1918, the town was part of the Austrian monarchy, the chief city of the district with the same name, one of the 78 provinces of Austrian Galicia. During Austrian rule, there was widespread poverty and starvation among local peasants. In 1846, several manor houses were burned in the so-called Galician slaughter. In 1849, Grybów was visited by Emperor Franz Joseph I of Austria, and in the 1860s, the town was visited by painter Artur Grottger, who came here to see his fiancée, Anna Monne. In 1900, Stanislaw Wyspianski and Józef Mehoffer also visited the town. By the late 19th century, Grybów slowly recovered, due to construction of a rail line and discovery of oil. In May 1915, the Battle of Gorlice took place near the town.

=== 20th century to present ===
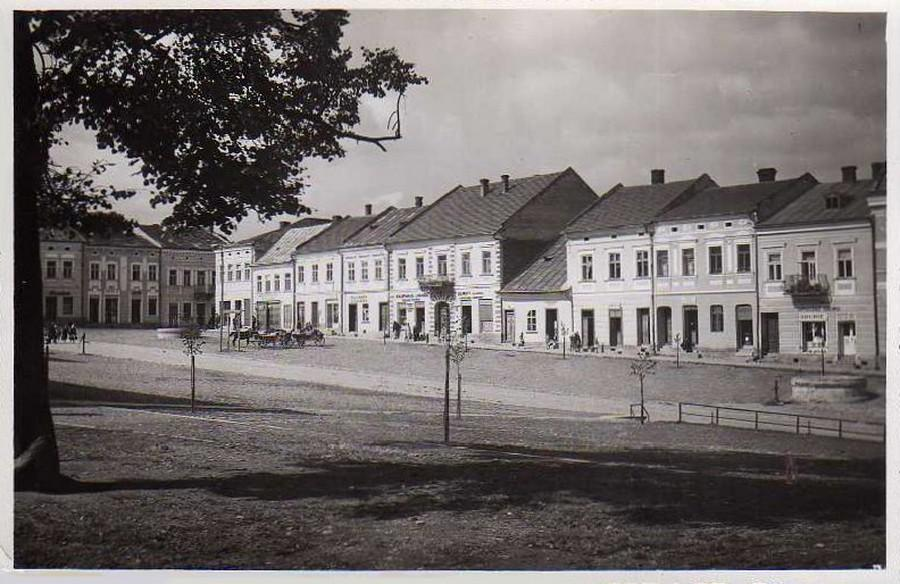
Grybów in the interbellum

In the Second Polish Republic, Grybów served as the county capital until 1932, when the Grybów County was dissolved. In the 1930s, local villages were centers of peasant protests (see 1937 peasant strike in Poland), and the town was visited several times by Wincenty Witos.

Following the German-Soviet invasion of Poland, which started World War II in September 1939, the town was occupied by Germany. On 20 August 1942, 360 Jewish citizens of the town were rounded up by the Nazis and taken two kilometers away to be murdered in the woods of Biata Nawa. There stands a monument on the site of the mass grave today, and the restored Jewish cemetery was unveiled in November 2019. In late 1944, the Wehrmacht named Grybów a fortress town, but due to rapid Soviet advance, the Germans retreated in January 1945. Nevertheless, almost 70% of the town was destroyed.

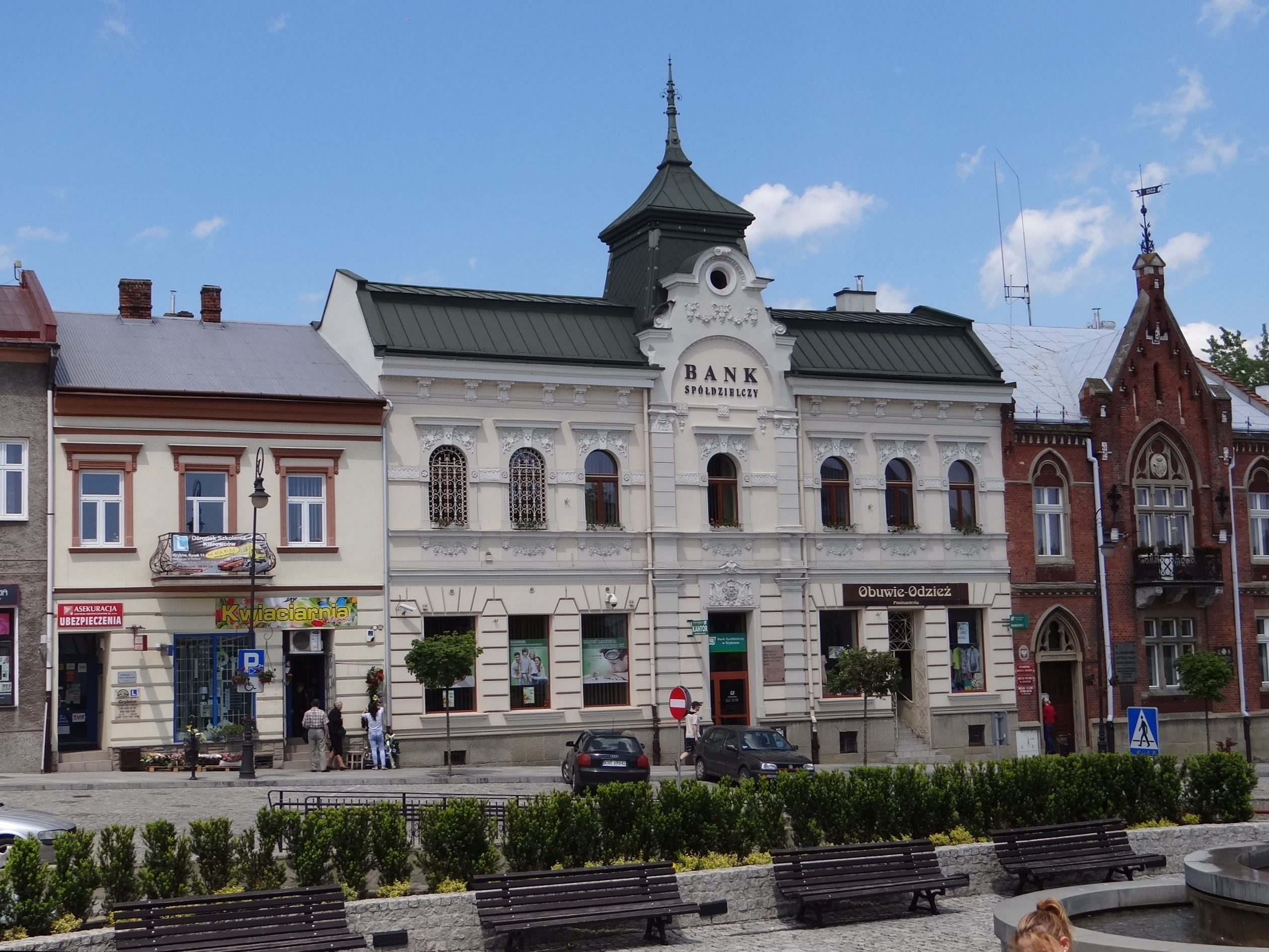
Tenement houses in the market square

== Notable individuals ==
- Kamil Giżycki (1893–1968), Polish writer and traveler
- Andrzej Marecki (1898–1943), Polish military and Home Army officer
- Odarka Bandrivska (1902–1981), Ukrainian chamber singer (soprano), pianist, teacher
- Tomasz Poręba (born 1973), Polish politician and Member of the European Parliament

== See also ==
- Walddeutsche from Doły Jasielsko-Sanockie, Poland
