= Odarka Bandrivska =

Ukrainian soprano singer (1902–1981)

- Одарка (Софія) Карлівна Бандрівська
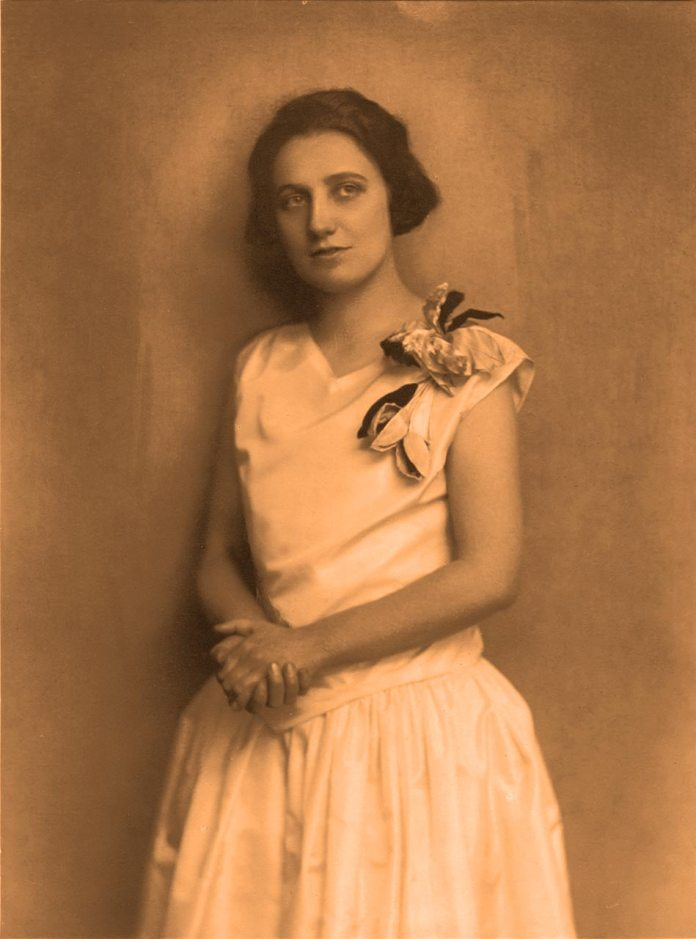
- Born: 17 March 1902; Grybów, Lemko Region, now Podkarpackie Voivodeship, Poland
- Died: 5 May 1981 (aged 79); Lviv
- Education: Mykola Lysenko Higher Music Institute, Vienna Music Academy, University of Lviv
- Occupations: Chamber singer (soprano), pianist, teacher

Odarka (Sofiia) Bandrivska (Ukrainian: Одарка (Софія) Карлівна Бандрівська; 17 March 1902 – 5 May 1981) was a Ukrainian chamber singer (soprano), pianist, teacher; founder of the Solomiya Krushelnytska Music and Memorial Museum in Lviv.

== Biography ==
On her mother's side, she is the niece of the outstanding singer Solomiya Krushelnytska. She studied at the classical gymnasium in Lviv. In 1922, she graduated from the piano faculty of the Mykola Lysenko Higher Music Institute (class of Mariia Krynytska). In 1922–1923, she honed her piano skills at the Vienna Music Academy under Professor Frank. In 1924–1928, she studied singing at the conservatory of the Polish Music Society under Professor 3. Kozlovska. In 1927, she graduated from the Faculty of Humanities at the University of Lviv. In 1928, she moved to Italy (Milan and Viareggio), where she honed her solo singing skills under Solomiya Krushelnytska.

Returning to Lviv in 1929, she began touring Ukraine, Poland, and Vienna. In the 1930s, she was actively involved in creative work as a singer and pianist.

She died on 5 May 1981 in Lviv and was buried in Lychakiv Cemetery (plot No. 4).

=== Teaching activities ===
- 1931–1939 — teacher of solo singing at the Mykola Lysenko Higher Music Institute.
- From 1940, he was an docent and dean of the vocal faculty at the Lviv Conservatory (now the Mykola Lysenko Lviv National Music Academy).
- 1944-1963 — once again in the position of docent of solo singing at the Lviv Conservatory.

She has published a number of scientific and methodological works.

Among the students: Myroslav Antonovych, Iia Matsiuk, P. Krynytska, Tamara Didyk, Mariia Protseviat, L. Doronina, Nadiia Safronova, and the vocal trio of the Baiko sisters.

== Repertoire, recordings ==
His chamber and vocal repertoire includes works by R. Strauss, H. Wolf, R. Wagner, J. Brahms, J. S. Bach, M. Lysenko, Y. Stepovy, V. Barvinsky, and other Galician composers.

The accompanists were: V. Barvinsky, N. Nyzhankivsky, H. Levytska, R. Simovych, L. Umanska, O. Yermakova, and Marianna Lysenko (daughter of Mykola Lysenko).

She left behind many recordings of works by Western European classics, Ukrainian and Galician composers.

== Preserving the legacy of Solomiya Krushelnytska ==
She devoted a lot of time and effort to restoring the memory of Solomiya Krushelnytska and multiplying her fame. She collected and preserved the singer's archive, on the basis of which the Solomiya Krushelnytska Music and Memorial Museum in Lviv (opened in 1991) was created.

Author of newspaper articles and memoirs about the outstanding artist, the Krushelnytskyi family, as well as S. Lyudkevych, I. Franko, H. Levytska, and O. Karpatskyi.

== Bibliography ==
- Історія будинку та музею Соломії Крушельницької
