= Plotycha, Bila rural hromada, Ternopil Raion, Ternopil Oblast =

Rural locality in Ternopil Oblast, Ukraine

Plotycha Плотича
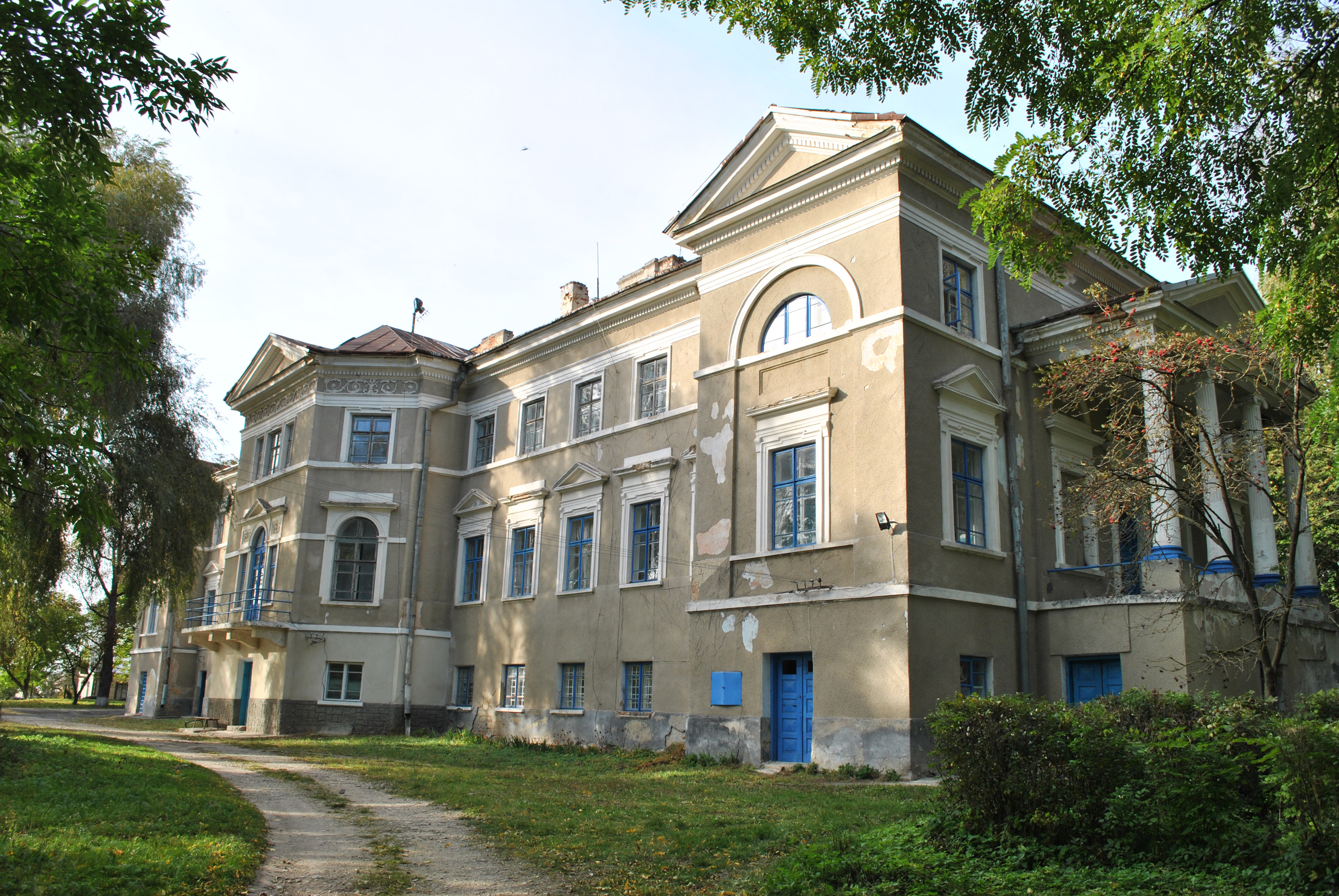
- Korytovych Palace in Ploticha.

- Location in Ternopil Oblast
- Coordinates: 49°37′28″N 25°33′37″E
- Country: Ukraine
- Oblast: Ternopil Oblast
- Raion: Ternopil Raion
- Hromada: Bila rural hromada
- Time zone: UTC+2 (EET)
  - Summer (DST): UTC+3 (EEST)
- Postal code: 47704

Plotycha (Ukrainian: Плотича) is a village in Bila rural hromada, Ternopil Raion, Ternopil Oblast, Ukraine.

== History ==
In the 18th century, the village was the property of the Lviv commandant and major general of the crown troops, Felicjan Korytowski, who built a palace and planted a park.

== Religion ==
- Church of St. Demetrius of Thessalonica (1883, rebuilt from a Roman Catholic church and restored in 1990; OCU),
- Church of the Assumption (1900, built in stone; UGCC).

== Sources ==
- (in Ukrainian) Романів В., Хорош В., Плотича // Ternopil Encyclopedic Dictionary: in 4 v. / editorial board: H. Yavorskyi and other, Ternopil: "Zbruch", 2008, V. 3: П—Я, S. 97–98. — ISBN 978-966-528-279-2.
- "Płotycza 1.) wś, pow. tarnopolski". Geographical Dictionary of the Kingdom of Poland (in Polish). 8. Warszawa: Kasa im. Józefa Mianowskiego. 1887. p. 322.
