= Solomiya Krushelnytska =

Ukrainian soprano singer (1872–1952)

- Соломія Крушельницька
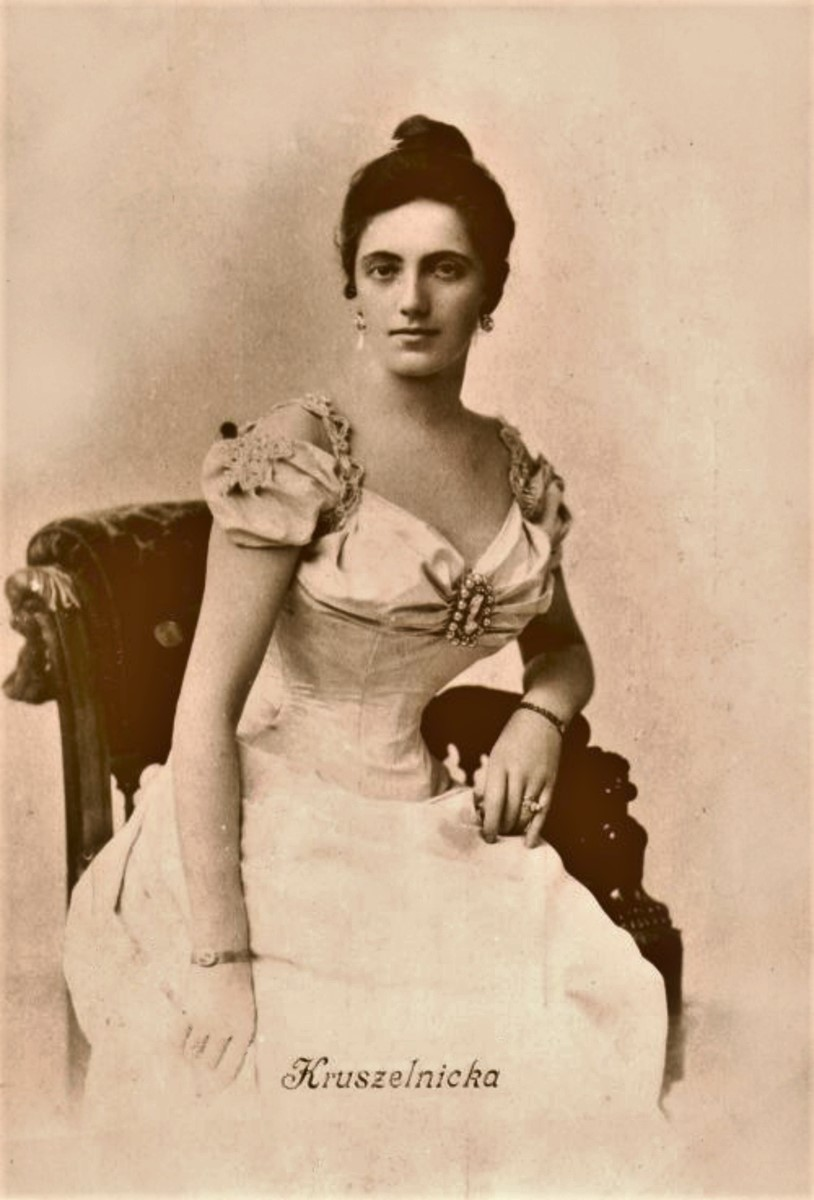
- Born: September 23, 1872; Bielawińce, Galicia, Austria-Hungary (now Biliavyntsi, Ukraine)
- Died: November 16, 1952 (aged 80); Lviv, Ukrainian SSR, Soviet Union (now Ukraine)
- Resting place: Lychakiv Cemetery
- Education: Walery Wysocki, Fausta Crespi
- Alma mater: Lviv Conservatory
- Known for: Operatic soprano
- Spouse: Alfredo Cesare Augusto Riccioni
- Awards: 1951; Merited Artist of Ukraine
- Memorials: Solomiya Krushelnytska Musical Memorial Museum in Lviv, Solomiya Krushelnytska Museum in Ternopil Oblast, the Solomiya Krushelnytska Lviv State Academic Opera and Ballet Theatre, Krushelnytska Monument in Ternopil, Solomiya Krushelnytska Streets in Kremenchuk, Kyiv, Lviv, and Ternopil
- Website: salomeamuseum.lviv.ua/en

Solomiya Krushelnytska (Note: Her name is sometimes spelt as Solomiya Ambrosiyivna Krushelnytska, Salomea Krusceniski, Krushel'nytska or Kruszelnicka.) (Ukrainian: Соломія Амвро́сіївна Крушельницька; 23 September [O.S. 11 September] 1872 – November 16, 1952) was a Ukrainian lyric-dramatic soprano, considered to be one of the brightest opera stars of the first half of the 20th century.

During her life, Krushelnytska was recognized as the most outstanding singer in the world. Among her numerous awards and distinctions, in particular, the title of "Wagner's diva" of the 20th century. She is credited with rescuing Puccini's Madama Butterfly from its failed debut at La Scala. The opera's re-creation in Brescia starring Krushlenytska received widespread acclaim. Singing with her on the same stage was considered an honor for Enrico Caruso, Titta Ruffo, Fedor Chaliapin. Italian composer Giacomo Puccini presented the singer with his portrait with the inscription "The most beautiful and charming Butterfly".

== Biography ==
=== Early life and education ===
Solomiya Krushelnytska was born in 1872 (although in later documents 1873 and 1876 were also mentioned as her dates of birth), in the village of Bielawińce, Galicia, Austria-Hungary (now Biliavyntsi, Ukraine) and baptized on 23 September of the same year. After several years of moving from village to village, in 1878 her father, a Ukrainian Greek Catholic priest Amvrosii Krushelnytskyi (Polish: Ambroży Kruszelnicki), settled with his large family in the village of Bila on the outskirts of the regional metropolis of Ternopil.

In addition to Solomiya, the noble-born family included her mother, Teodora Maria (née Savchynska, died 1907), five sisters (Olha, Osypa, Hanna, Emilia and Maria) and two brothers (Anton and Volodymyr).

In her memoirs, Solomiya's niece Odarka Bandrivska writes that as a child, the future diva came to learn a fair number of Ukrainian folk songs from the residents of the various villages in which her family had lived.

=== Studying in Ternopil ===
Solomiya started singing at a young age and received the basics of musical training at the Ternopil Classical Gymnasium, where she took external exams. There she became close to a group of high school students, one of the members of which was Denys Sichynsky, later a famous composer.

In 1883, at the Shevchenko Concert in Ternopil, Solomiya, who sang in the choir of the Ruska Besida society, made her first public performance. At one of the choir's concerts on August 2, 1885, Ivan Franko was present.

In Ternopil Solomiya Krushelnytska encountered theater for the first time. the Lviv theater of the Ruska Besida society, which regularly performed there, included in its repertoire operas by Semen Hulak-Artemovsky and Mykola Lysenko and employed drama actors such as Filomena Lopatynska, Antonina Osipovycheva, Stepan Yanovych, Andriy Muzhyk-Stechynsky, Mykhailo Olshansky, Karolina Klishevska.

=== Studying at the Lviv Conservatory ===
According to tradition, as a clergyman's daughter Krushelnytska should have married another priest, but noticing her artistic talent, her father allowed her to study music. In 1891, Solomiya entered the Lviv Conservatory of the Galician Music Society. At the conservatory, her teacher was the then famous professor in Lviv, Walery Wysocki, who raised a wide array of famous Ukrainian and Polish singers. During her studies at the conservatory, her first solo performance took place on April 13, 1892, the singer performed the main part in GF Handel's oratorio "Messiah". On June 5, 1892, another performance of the singer took place in the Lviv Boyana, where she performed Mykola Lysenko's song "Why do I have black eyebrows".

Solomiya Krushelnytska's first opera debut took place on April 15, 1893: she performed the part of Leonora in the opera "Favorite" by the Italian composer Gaetano Donizetti on the stage of the Skarbek Theatre. Then her partners were the famous Rudolf Bernhardt and Julian Jerome. Her performances in the role of Sanctuary in P. Mascagni's "Village Honor" were also very successful. In 1893, Krushelnytska graduated from the Lviv Conservatory.

=== Career ===
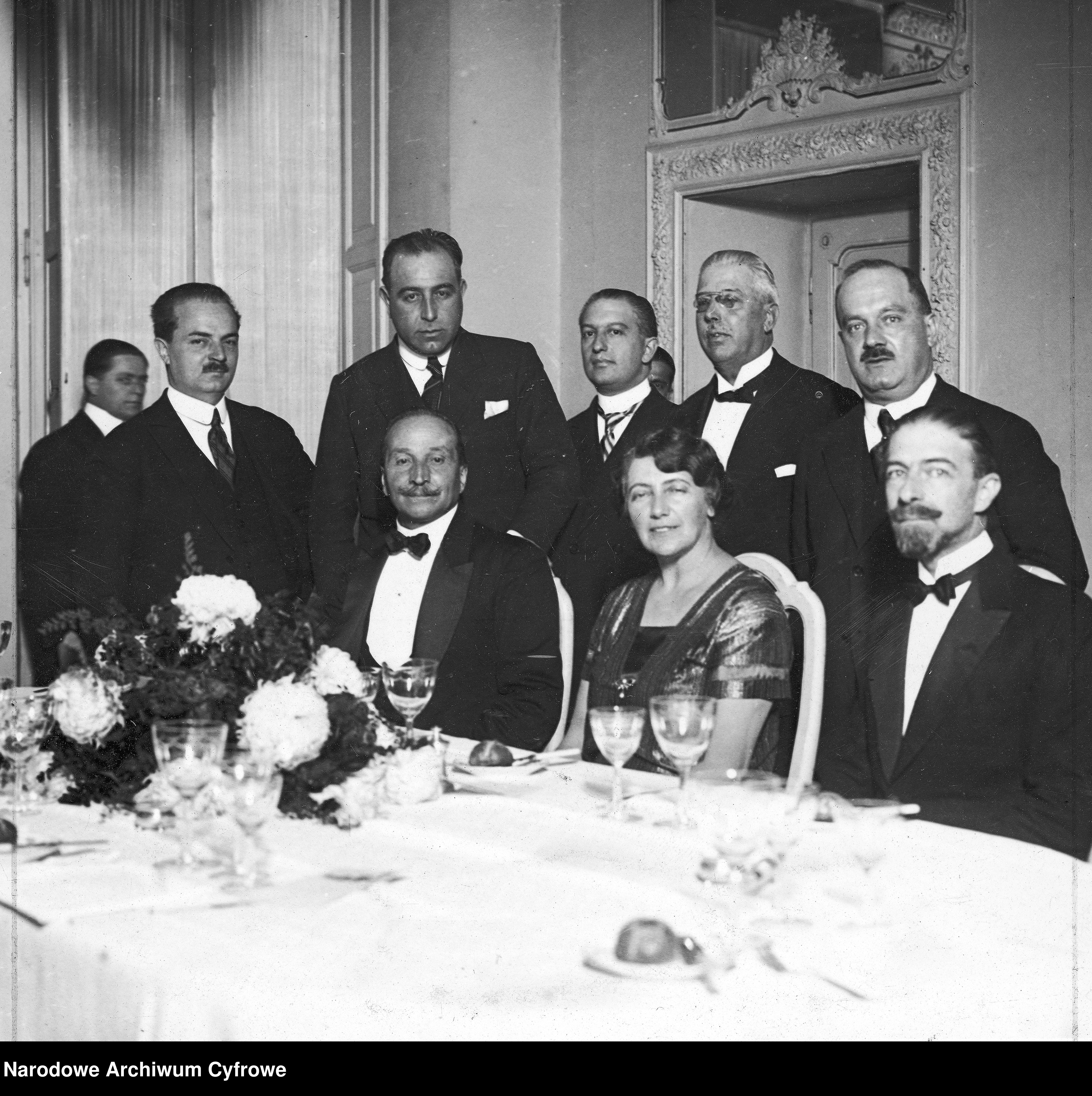
Salomea Krushelnytska at Duke Giovanelli's reception in Rome after her performance in the Royal Philharmony, 1924

Krushelnytska followed her 1893 professional debut with additional performances at the Lviv Opera. On the advice of Gemma Bellincioni, who witnessed Solomiya's talents in Lviv that summer, the young Krushelnytska would travel to Italy in the fall of 1893 to pursue further vocal studies. After her father took out a loan for her travels, Solomiya arrived in Milan where she would study under Fausta Crespi, while living with Bellincioni's mother. It was under Crespi's tutelage that Solomiya transitioned from her previous training as a mezzo-soprano to a lyric-dramatic soprano. For the following 3 years, she would divide her time between Milan and Lviv, returning regularly for engagements with the Lviv Opera in order to pay for her ongoing studies in Italy.

Solomiya would go on to perform in Odesa (1896–1897), Warsaw (1898–1902), St Petersburg (1901–1902), the Paris Grand Opera (1902), Naples (1903–04), Cairo and Alexandria (1904), and Rome (1904–05).

In 1904, she famously became a savior of Puccini's Madama Butterfly. The opera had been booed by the audience at its premiere in Milan's La Scala, but three months later in Brescia, a revised version of the work, with Krushelnytska singing the leading role, was a major success.

Her schedule, during her studies in Milan, included vocal lessons, acting lessons, learning new parts, learning new languages – for six hours every day. Her leisure time included visits to museums and historic sites, attendance at operatic and theatrical performances. She maintained active correspondence with friends and acquaintances, covering such issues as the fate of her native Ukraine, problems of culture, recently read books. In addition, Krushelnytska regularly appeared in performances of the music and drama school L'Armonia.

On tours, she sang in four and five productions during a single week. She could learn a part in a new opera in two days, and develop the character of a role in another three or four. Her repertoire totaled 63 parts. In the history of music, Krushelnytska is known as an active promoter of the works of her contemporaries, and of Richard Wagner. In 1902 she starred in a successful production of Lohengrin in Paris. In 1906 she appeared to acclaim at Milan's La Scala in Richard Strauss's Salome, conducted by Arturo Toscanini. She also performed in other theatres across Europe, Egypt, Algeria, Argentina, Brazil, Chile and others.

In 1910, Krushelnytska married Italian attorney and the mayor of Viareggio, Alfredo Cesare Augusto Riccioni. In 1920, at the height of her career, she left the opera world, and three years later started concert tours, performing in Western Europe, Canada and the USA. Her knowledge of eight languages allowed her to include in her concert programs songs of many nations. She was a fervent promoter of Ukrainian folk songs and works by Ukrainian composers.

=== Later life ===
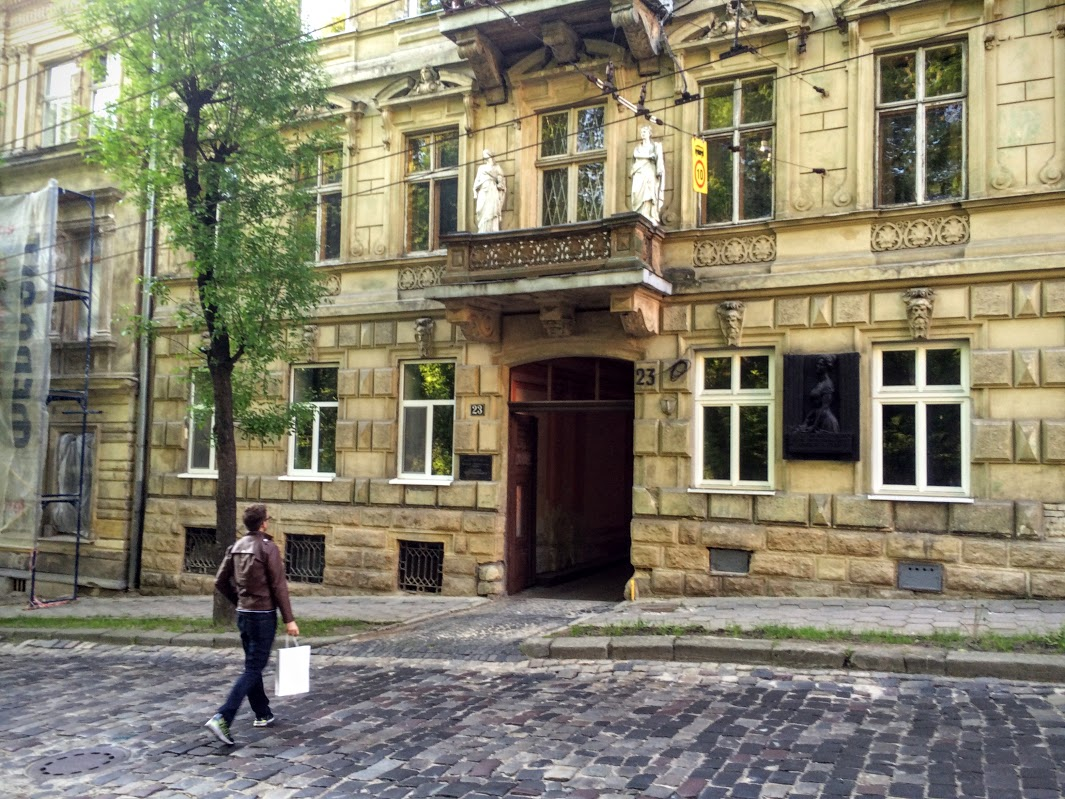
Solomiya Krushelnytska's home in Lviv

Prior to the death of her mother Teodora in 1907, Solomiya's family convinced her to purchase a residence in Lviv, to use whenever she returned from touring, and to provide a comfortable living space for the rest of the family, especially for her mother towards the end of her life. In 1903, Solomiya purchased a building located on what is now Krushelnytska Street (named in her honor in 1993), uphill from the campus of Lviv University. Built and designed by Jakub Kroch in 1884, the large building had several floors of living space, initially occupied by members of Krushelnytska's immediate family. Solomiya's brother-in-law Karl Bandriwsky was asked to oversee the management of the building once apartments began be rented out following the departure of her siblings after marriage. With a facade featuring heavy rustication decorated with ornamental statuary of lyrical muses by Leonard Marconi, the building became known as Lviv's Stonehouse of Music (Ukrainian: Музикальнa кам’яниця), a haven for intellectuals, visiting artists and impresarios engaged at the nearby opera house. In the latter years of his life, it would also serve as the home of writer and family friend, Ivan Franko.

In August 1939, after the death of her husband, Krushelnytska left Italy and returned to her home in Lviv, which during the interbellum period had become an important stronghold of the Second Polish Republic. Tragically, she would remain trapped in this city for the rest of her life, when only a few weeks following her arrival, Nazi Germany and the Soviet Union colluded to invade Poland and divide its territory between them in September 1939. The two invading armies met at Lviv, and proceeded to lay siege to the city. The city would suffer under 10 days of shelling by Luftwaffe bombers, German panzer strikes and Red Army cavalry raids, incurring the loss of several thousand lives and the destruction of many historic buildings, including the complete leveling of the Church of the Holy Spirit one block away from the Krushelnytska residence. Following the surrender of Polish forces, Lviv was ceded to Soviet occupation, which swiftly enacted a brutal regime of repression. The home of Solomiya Krushelnytska, was seized by the authorities, leaving her only one living quarters on the second floor to share with her sister, Hanna. For much of this period, Solomiya Krushelnytska remained confined to her house, due to a broken leg.

Less than two years later, the German army invaded Ukraine again, and Lviv fell under Nazi occupation by July 1941. This time, it was the Wehrmacht that took over two floors of the Krushelnytska residence, forcing all occupants to either move out or move in together on the upper floors. Solomiya would survive the years of ethnic cleansing her city would endure, until the return of Soviet troops in 1944 would transition her into the final stage of her life, as an artist trapped behind the Iron Curtain. The formerly world-renowned artist began giving voice lessons and would return to her alma mater, the Lviv Conservatory, as a professor. In 1951, she was recognized as a Merited Artist of Ukraine. Solomiya Krushelnytska died on November 16, 1952, and was subsequently buried at Lviv's Lychakiv Cemetery, across from the gravesite of her friend, Ivan Franko.

== Personal life ==
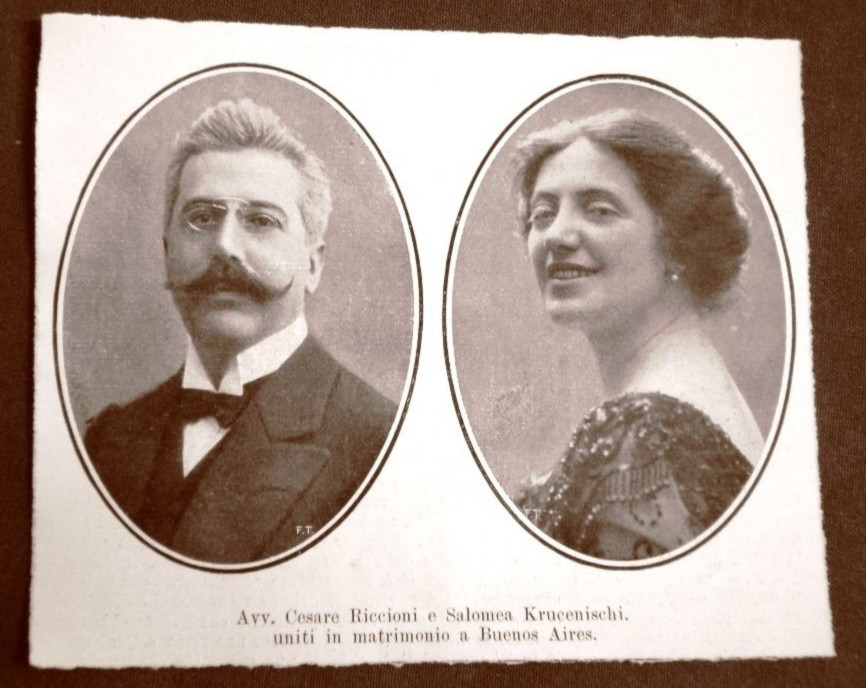
Solomiya Krushelnytska and her husband, Alfredo Cesare Augusto Riccioni

Before her marriage Krushelnytska had been proposed by at least three men: theological seminary graduate Zenon Hutkovskyi, lawyer Teofil Okunevskyi and pharmacist Yosyp Bilynskyi. During a court process related to the cancellation of one of her planned concerts in Naples in 1906, which was caused by the eruption of Mount Vesuvius, Solomiya met Cesare Riccioni, an Italian lawyer, and they soon became a couple. Krushelnytska and Riccioni married on 19 July 1910 in Buenos Aires during the singer's tour around South America. They settled in Viareggio, where Riccioni was several times elected as mayor. The family's villa became a point of attraction for numerous artistic figures, including Giacomo Puccini, Titta Ruffo, Giuseppe De Luca, Giuseppe Anselmi and Alfredo Casella. After Riccioni's death in 1936 Krushelnytska remained a widow.

== Legacy ==
- The Lviv Theatre of Opera and Ballet is named after her (Lviv State Academic Opera and Ballet Theatre of Solomiya Krushelnytska, Ukrainian: Львівський Державний академічний театр опери та балету імені Соломії Крушельницької). Lviv Secondary Specialized Music Boarding School named after Solomiya Krushelnytska is also named after her.
- In 1982 at the Kyiv Studio of Feature Films named after O. Dovzhenko, director Fialko Oleh Borysovych created a historical and biographical film dedicated to the life and work of Solomiya Krushelnytska - "Return of the Butterfly", based on the novel of the same name by Valeria Vrublevska. The film is based on the real facts of the singer's life and is based on her memories. Solomiya's parts are performed by Gisela Tsipol. The role of Solomiya in the film was played by Yelena Safonova.
- In addition, documentaries have been made, including:

"Solomiya Krushelnytska" (directed by I. Mudrak, Lviv, "Mist", 1994);

- "Solomiya Krushelnytska" (1994, Ukrtelefilm, authors: N. Davydovska, V. Kuznetsov, opera M. Markovsky; musicologist M. Golovashchenko takes part in the film);
- "Two Lives of Solomiya" (directed by O. Frolov, Kyiv, "Contact", 1997);

prepared a TV show from the series "Names" (2004);

- Documentary "Solo-mea" from the series "Game of Fate" (directed by V. Obraz, VIATEL studio, 2008).
- In 1995, the premiere of the play "Solomiya Krushelnytska" (author B. Melnychuk, I. Lyakhovsky) took place at the Ternopil Regional Drama Theater (now the Academic Theater). Since 1987, the Solomiya Krushelnytska Competition has been held in Ternopil. Every year an international competition named after Krushelnytska takes place in Lviv; opera festivals have become traditional.
- In 1997, the National Bank of Ukraine issued a commemorative coin with a face value of 2 hryvnias, dedicated to the 125th anniversary of the singer's birth.
- March 18, 2006 on the stage of the Lviv National Academic Opera and Ballet Theater. S. Krushelnytska hosted the premiere of Myroslav Skoryk's ballet "Return of the Butterfly", based on events from the life of Solomiya Krushelnytska. The ballet uses music by Giacomo Puccini.
- 1963 a memorial plaque and a memorial museum-manor of Solomiya Krushelnytska were opened in the village of Bila, Ternopil district.
- An exhibition dedicated to Krushelnytska functions in the village of Bilyavyntsi, Buchach district.
- In 2010 a monument to Krushelnytska was unveiled in Ternopil.
- Also in her honor are named 14 huts of the UPU named after Solomiya Krushelnytska.
- On October 1, 1989, the music and memorial museum was opened in the singer's apartment. In 1993, the street where she lived in the last years of her life was named after S. Krushelnytska in Lviv.
- A street in Darnytskyi district of Kyiv is also named after Solomiya Krushelnytska.

== Publications ==
- Semotiuk, A.J. (2023), Solomea: Star of Opera's Golden Age, Courageous Heart Productions (Toronto) ISBN 978-617-7482-52-8

== Gallery ==
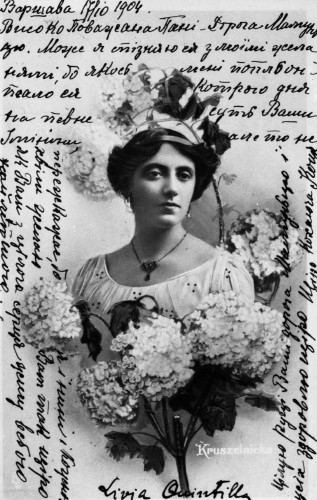
Signed card of Solomiya Krushelnytska as Livia in Livia Quintilla by Zygmunt Noskowski

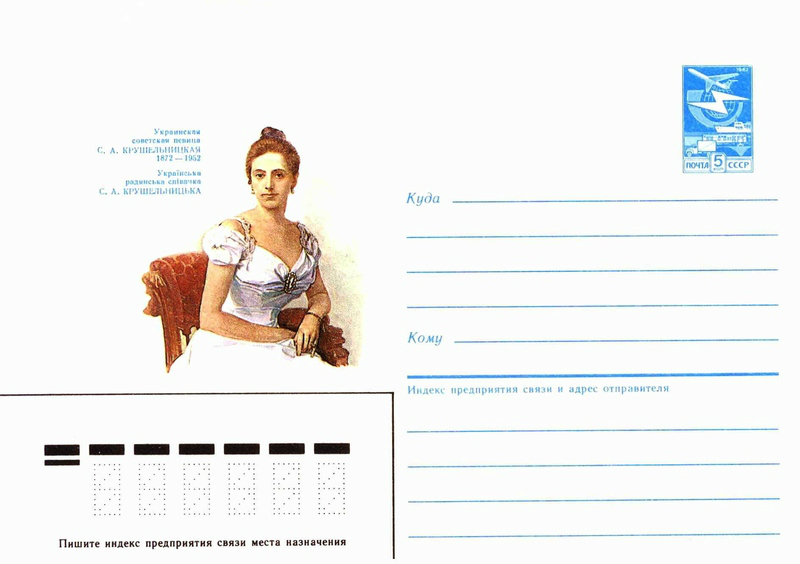
Soviet envelope featuring Solomiya Krushelnytska in 1987

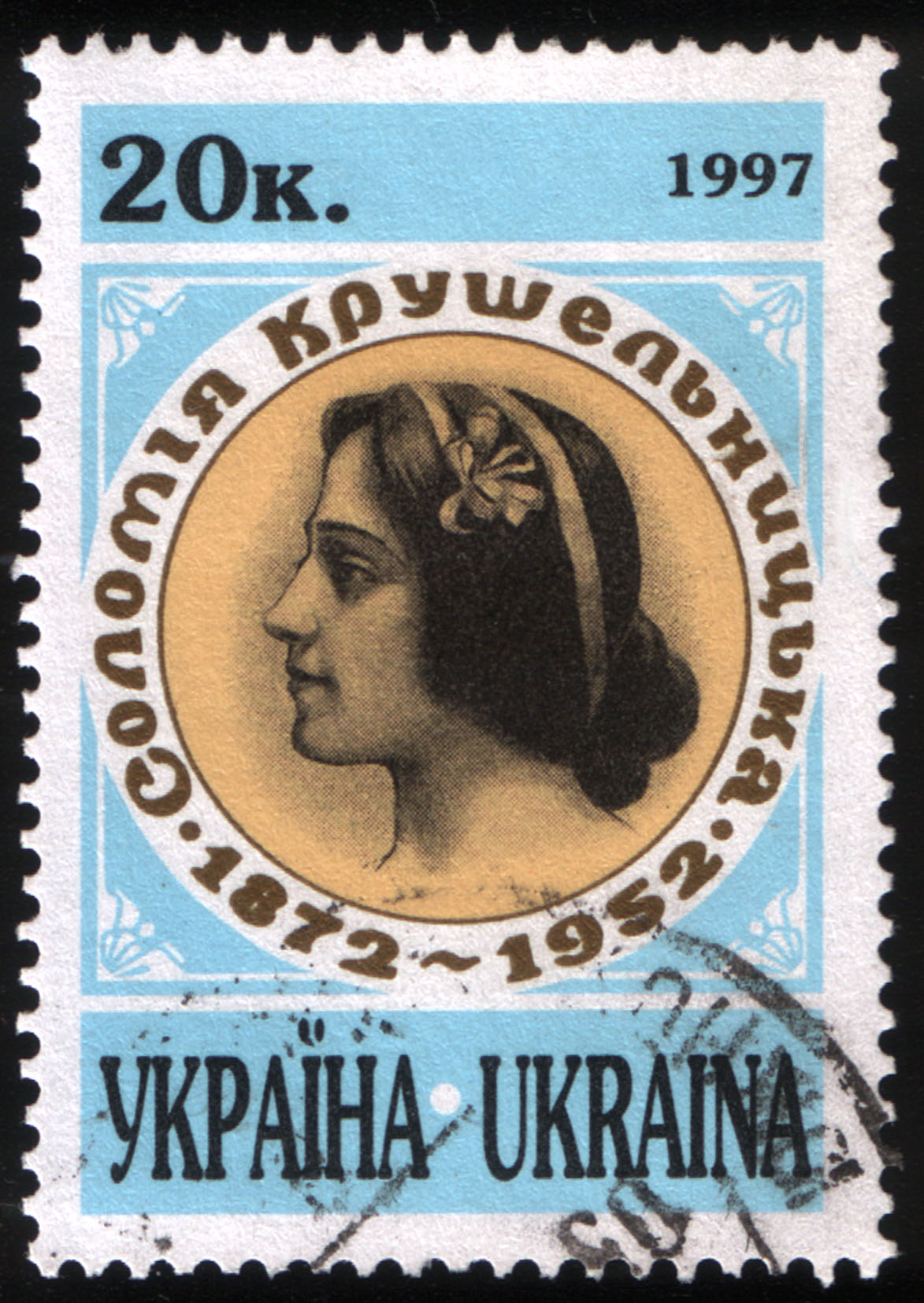
Stamp of Ukraine, Solomiya Krushelnytska, 1997 (Michel № 219).

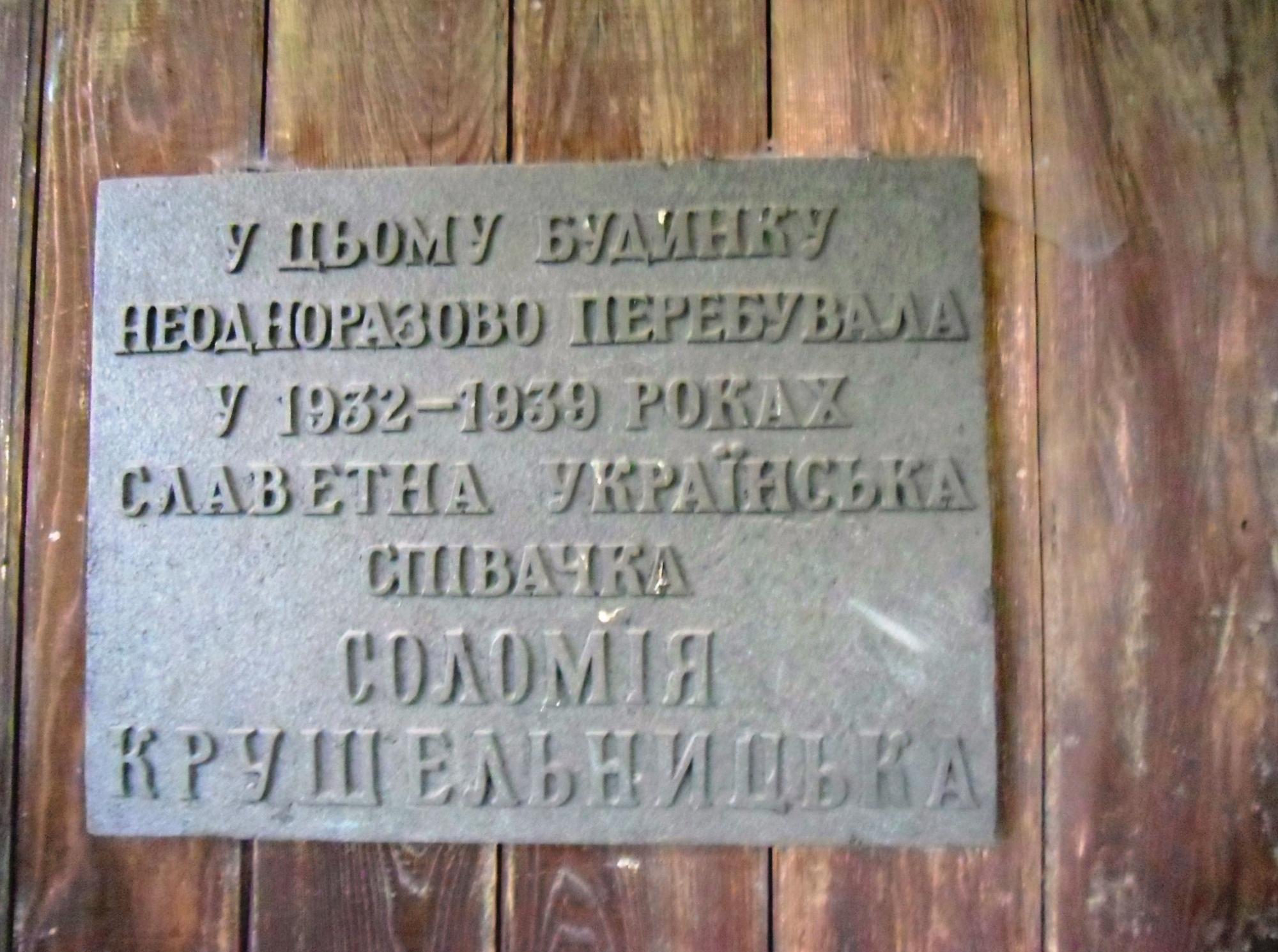
Board of memory stay of Solomiya Krushelnytska in the village Dubyna.

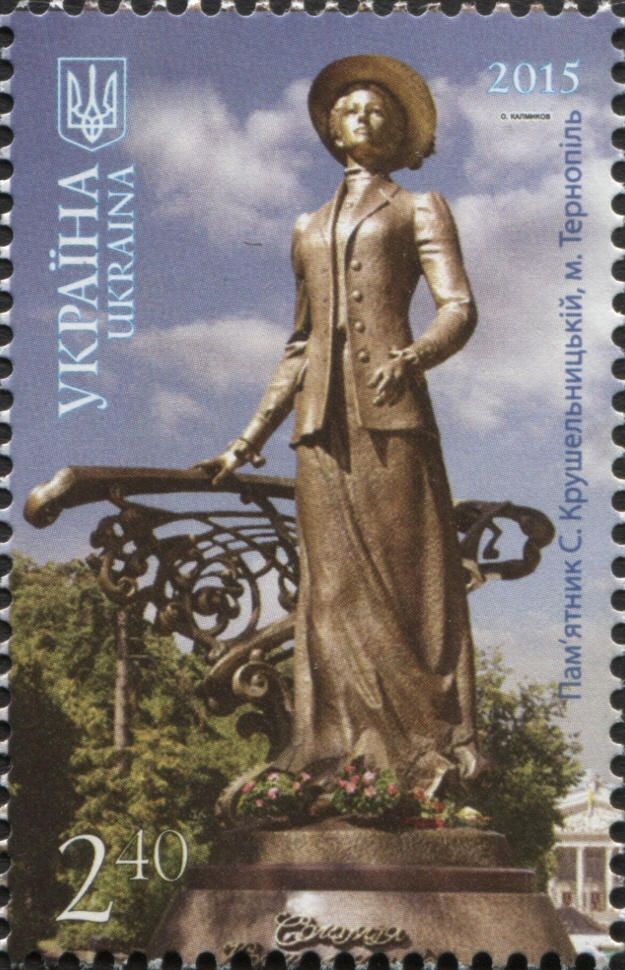
Stamp of Ukraine, Solomiya Krushelnytska statue in Ternopil, 2015

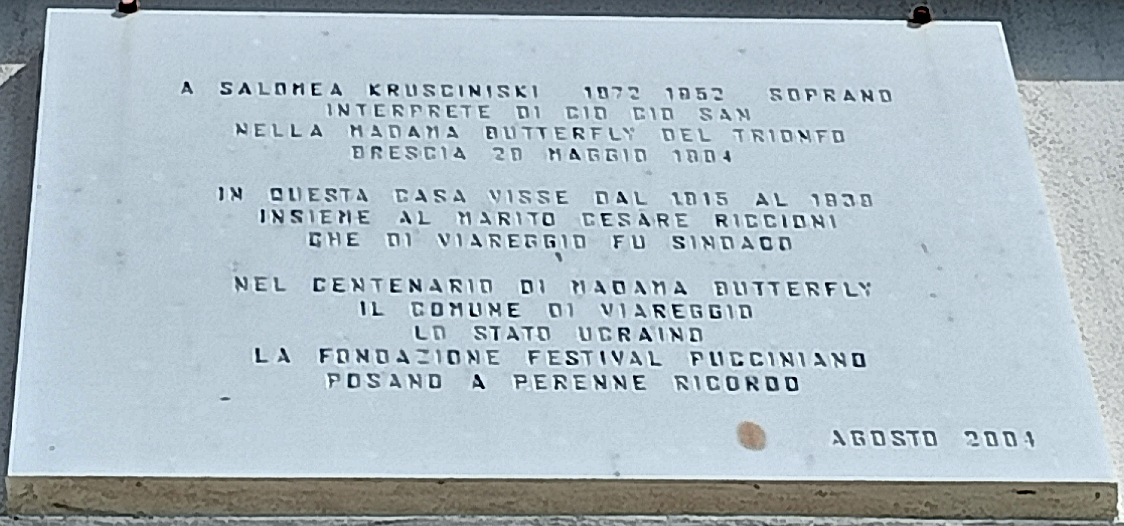
Memorial plate, Villa Salomea, Viale Garducci 25 Viareggio

== Notes ==
Footnotes

Sources

- Celletti, Rodolfo (1992), 'Kruscelnitska, Salomea' in The New Grove Dictionary of Opera, ed. Stanley Sadie (London) ISBN 0-333-73432-7
- Biography, photoalbum, sound clip of Ukrainian Opera Star Krushelnytska
