= Biliavyntsi =

Biliavyntsi Білявинці
- Village
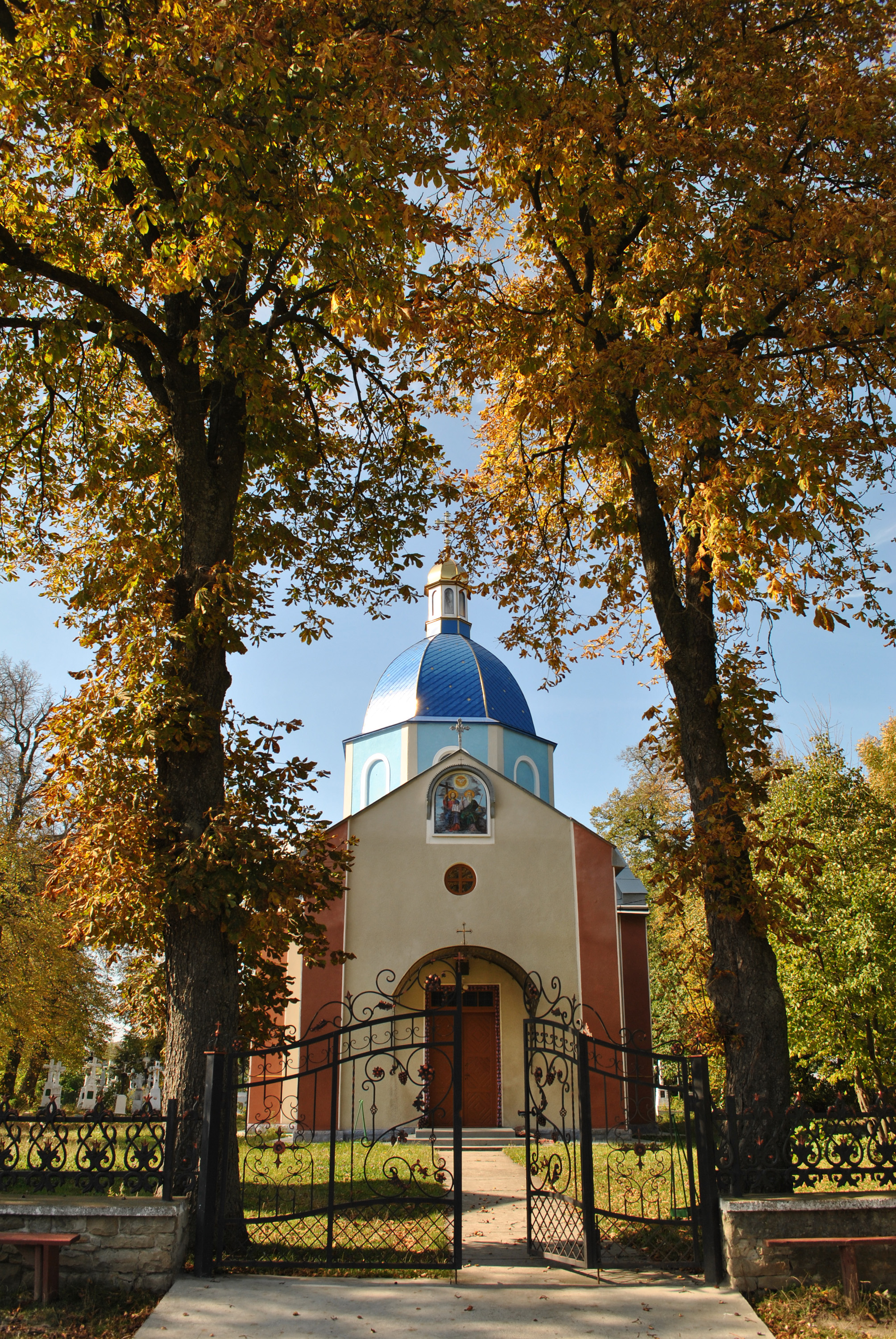
- Church of the Holy Spirit

- Location within Ukraine Location within Ternopil Oblast
- Coordinates: 49°09′01″N 25°22′2″E
- Country: Ukraine
- Oblast: Ternopil Oblast
- Raion: Chortkiv Raion

Area
  - Total: 2,068 km^{2} (798 sq mi)

Population (2014)
  - Total: ▼575
  - Density: 30,174/km^{2} (78,150/sq mi)
- Time zone: UTC+2 (EET)
  - Summer (DST): UTC+3 (EEST)
- Postal code: 48413
- Area code: +380 3544

Biliavyntsi (Ukrainian: Біля́винці) is a village in Chortkiv Raion, Ternopil Oblast, western Ukraine. It belongs to Buchach urban hromada, one of the hromadas of Ukraine. The Strypa River flows through of the village. The population of the village was 575 in 2014.

== History ==
First written mention comes from the 17th century. Then belonged to the Polish–Lithuanian Commonwealth, from 1772 until 1918 to Austrian (Habsburg monarchy, Austrian Empire, Austria-Hungary) empires, in 1918-1919 to West Ukrainian People's Republic. From 1991 belonged to Ukraine.

Reading room of Ukrainian society Prosvita operated in the village.

Solomiya Krushelnytska, one of the brightest soprano opera stars of the first half of the 20th century, was born in the village.

Until 18 July 2020, Biliavyntsi belonged to Buchach Raion. The raion was abolished in July 2020 as part of the administrative reform of Ukraine, which reduced the number of raions of Ternopil Oblast to three. The area of Buchach Raion was merged into Chortkiv Raion.

== Attractions ==
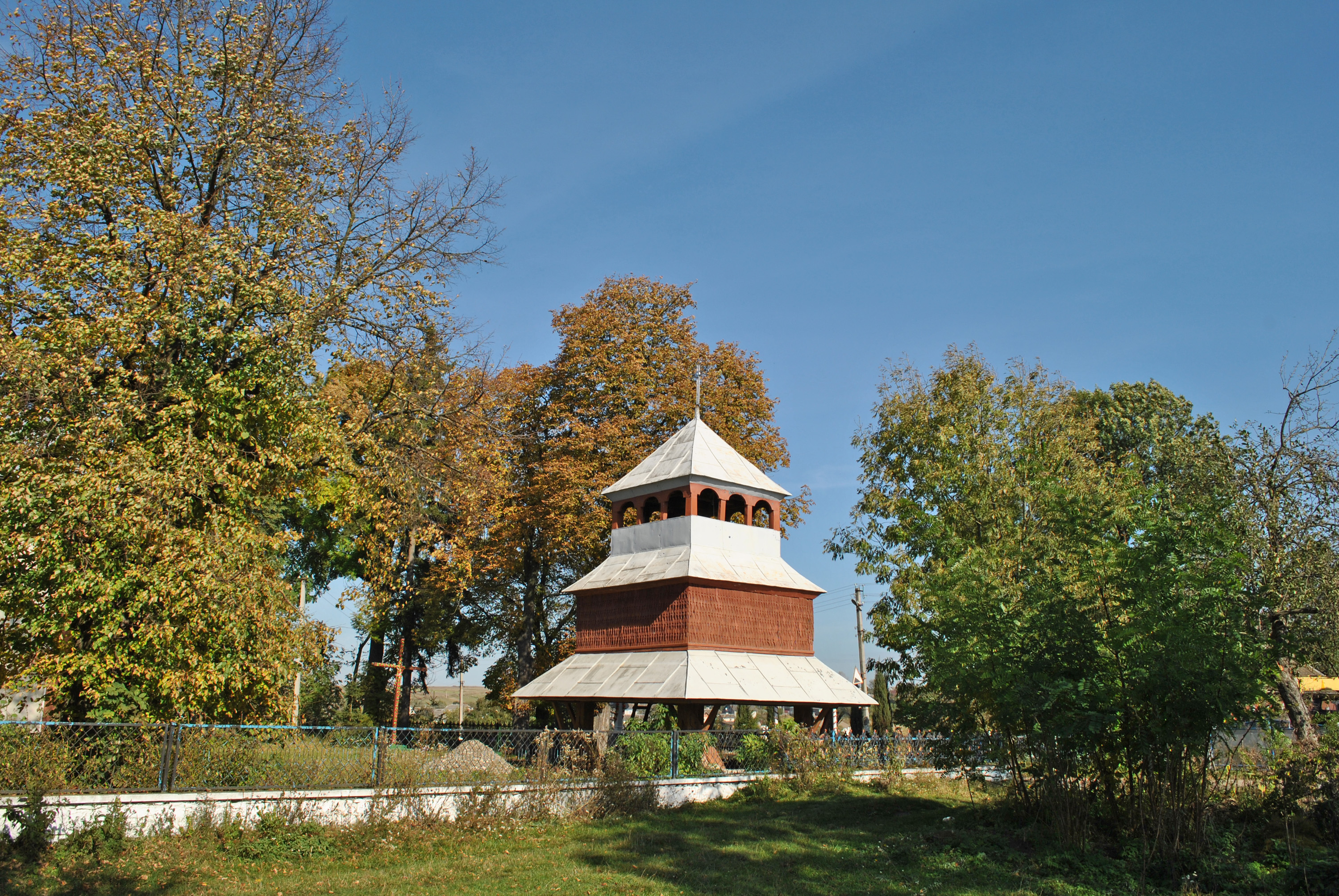
Wooden bell tower

- Church of St. Trinity (1909)
- Chapel (1849)
- Bell tower, wooden
