= P39 road (Ukraine) =

Road in Ukraine

Road P39
- Автошлях Р39
- P39 road in Bila

Route information
- Length: 72.3 km (44.9 mi)

Major junctions
- northwest end: Brody
- southeast end: Ternopil

Location
- Country: Ukraine
- Oblasts: Lviv, Ternopil

Highway system
- Roads in Ukraine; State Highways
← P 38	→ P 40

P39 is a regional road (P-Highway) in Lviv and Ternopil Oblast, Ukraine. It runs northwest-southeast and connects Brody with Ternopil.

As of autumn 2014, the condition of the Lviv Oblast section of P39 is unsatisfactory.

== See also ==
- Roads in Ukraine
