= Chystyliv =

Rural locality in Ternopil Oblast, Ukraine

Chystyliv Чистилів
- Location in Ternopil Oblast
- Coordinates: 49°36′38″N 25°34′3″E
- Country: Ukraine
- Oblast: Ternopil Oblast
- Raion: Ternopil Raion
- Hromada: Bila rural hromada
- Time zone: UTC+2 (EET)
  - Summer (DST): UTC+3 (EEST)
- Postal code: 47704

Chystyliv (Ukrainian: Чистилів, Polish: Czystyłów) is a village in Bila rural hromada, Ternopil Raion, Ternopil Oblast, Ukraine.

Near the village there is the Chystyliv sanctuary.

== History ==
The first written mention of the village was in 1447.

== Religion ==
- Saint Michael's church (1992, brick).

== Sources ==
- (in Ukrainian) Уніят В., Чистилів // Ternopil Encyclopedic Dictionary: in 4 v. / editorial board: H. Yavorskyi and other, Ternopil: "Zbruch", 2008, V. 3: П—Я, S. 598—599. — ISBN 978-966-528-279-2.
- "Czystyłów". Geographical Dictionary of the Kingdom of Poland (in Polish). 1. Warszawa: Kasa im. Józefa Mianowskiego. 1880. p. 886.
