= Bila, Ternopil Raion, Ternopil Oblast =

Rural locality in Ternopil Oblast, Ukraine

Bila Біла
- Village

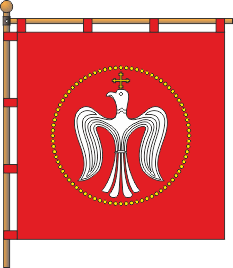
- Flag

- Location within Ukraine Location within Ternopil Oblast
- Coordinates: 49°35′03″N 25°34′41″E
- Country: Ukraine
- Oblast: Ternopil Oblast
- District: Ternopil Raion

Area
  - Total: 1.570 km^{2} (0.606 sq mi)
- Elevation: 314 m (1,030 ft)

Population (2019)
  - Total: 3,324
  - Density: 2,117/km^{2} (5,484/sq mi)
- Time zone: UTC+2 (EET)
  - Summer (DST): UTC+3 (EEST)
- Postal code: 47707
- Area code: +380 352

Bila (Ukrainian: Біла) is a village in Ternopil Raion, Ternopil Oblast of Western Ukraine.

== History ==
The existence of the village became known in the second half of the 16th century, in a document of the Polish magnate Konstanty Wasyl Ostrogski, where the fields that at that time belonged to Tarnopol were registered. In 1884, Oleksander Barvinsky launched one of the main cultural centers in the area here. In 1912, the first Ternopil airfield was established in Bila, where some of the first flight demonstrations in present-day Ukraine were made. Until the creation of the current municipality in 2018, the town formed a rural council on its own.

== Geography ==
Bila is located on the northern outskirts of the regional capital Ternopil, at the exit of the city from the P39 road leading to Brody. The village is separated from the capital by the Ternopil-Vantazhnyi railway station and the adjoining industrial estate.

== Religion ==
- St. Nicholas Church (1601, restored in 1910; restored in 1989, UGCC),
- Church of St. Kniahynia Olha (1997, brick; architect Y. Viunov, OCU),
- Church of the Intercession (2004, brick, UGCC),
- Spiritual youth center and Sunday school (1927, former Roman Catholic church, UGCC)

== Demographics ==
In 2007, 2,927 people lived in the village.

=== Languages ===
Native language as of the Ukrainian Census of 2001:

Language	Percentage
Ukrainian	99.15 %
Russian	0.61 %
Belarusian	0.10 %
Armenian	0.03 %

== Notable residents ==
- Hanna Krushelnytska (1887–1965), Ukrainian opera and concert singer (soprano)

== Sources ==
- (in Ukrainian) В. Уніят, Біла // Ternopil Encyclopedic Dictionary: in 4 v. / editorial board: H. Yavorskyi and other, Ternopil: "Zbruch", 2004, V. 1: А—Й, S. 126. — ISBN 966-528-197-6.
- (in Ukrainian) В. Уніят-Карпович, Біла // Ternopil Oblast. History of cities and villages: in 3 v. / Ternopil: "Terno-graph", 2014, V. 3: М—Ш, S. 352—354. — ISBN 978-966-457-246-7.
- "Biała (5), wś, pow. tarnopolski". Geographical Dictionary of the Kingdom of Poland (in Polish). 1. Warszawa: Kasa im. Józefa Mianowskiego. 1880. p. 171.
