= Mykola Shevchuk =

Ukrainian painter (born 1965)

- Микола Степанович Шевчук
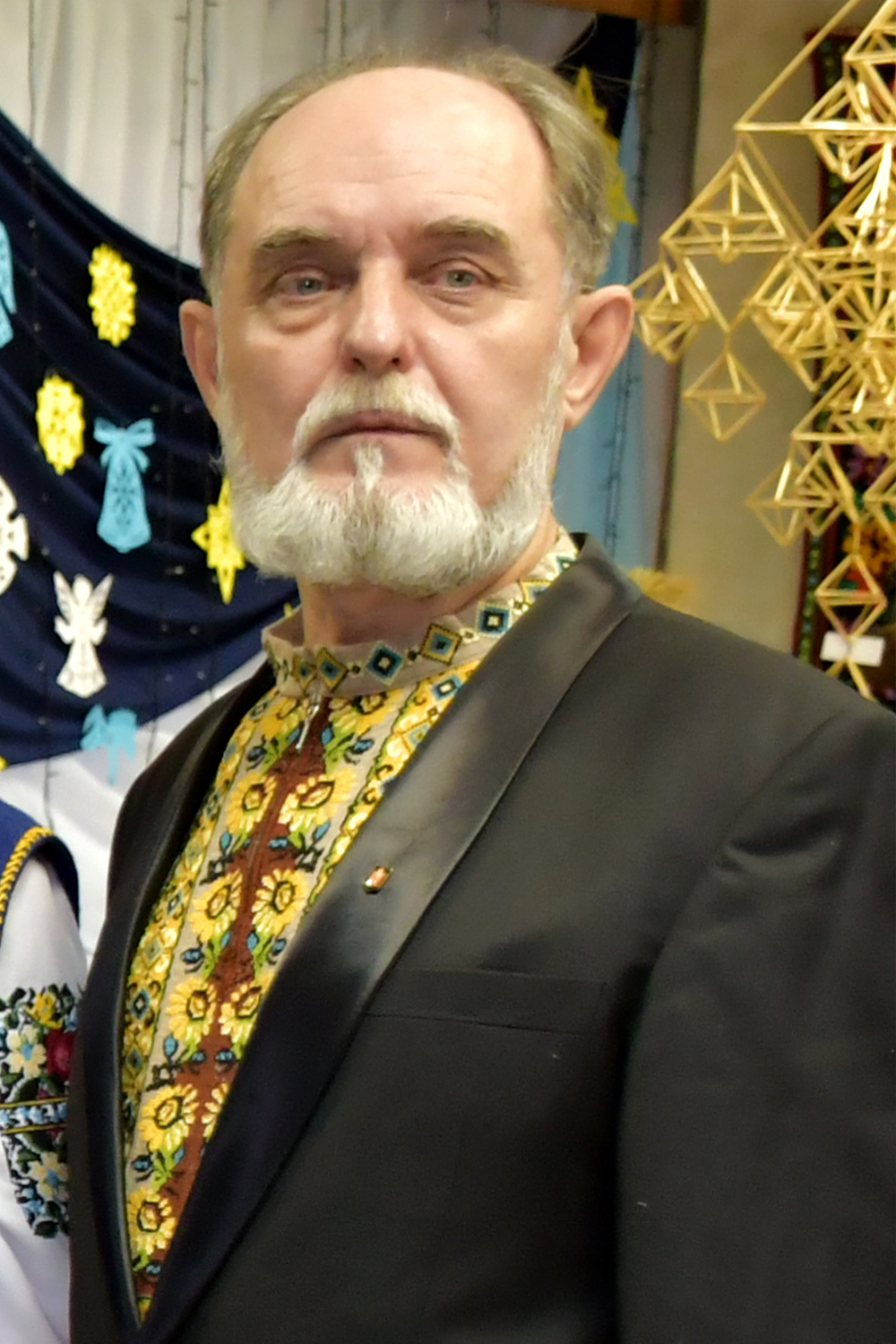
- Born: 30 October 1965 (age 60); Smyha, now Rivne Oblast, Ukraine
- Education: Lviv Polytechnic
- Occupations: Painter, graphic artist, sculptor, icon painter, teacher, volunteer
- Awards: Merited Painter of Ukraine

Mykola Shevchuk (Ukrainian: Микола Степанович Шевчук; born 30 October 1965) is a Ukrainian painter, graphic artist, sculptor, icon painter, teacher, volunteer. Member of the National Union of Artists of Ukraine (1997).

== Biography ==
Mykola Shevchuk was born on 30 October 1965 in Smyha in the Dubno Raion of Rivne Oblast.

From 1980 to 1984, he studied at the Kremenets Pedagogical School. After graduation, he worked as a labor and drawing teacher at a school in the village of Vovchkivtsi in the Ternopil Raion.

In 1992, he graduated from the Faculty of Architecture of the Lviv Polytechnic (now the National University "Lviv Polytechnic"; teachers in the field: V. Lypovyi, B. Skyba).

From 1993 to 1995, he worked as an engineer-architect for the Terebovlia City Council.

From 1995, he was a lecturer at the Terebovlia School of Culture (now the Terebovlia College of Culture and Arts), and one of the founders of the school's decorative and applied arts department.

=== Public activities ===
Active participant in the Orange Revolution and the Revolution of Dignity. Head of the Vasyl Stus Memorial Raion Public Organization. In 2014–2016, he organized and participated in art auctions in support of Ukrainian soldiers. Member of the volunteer public organization "Terebovlianska Vezha". Participant in multiple trips to the combat zone to visit Ukrainian defenders and orphaned children in orphanages, with the aim of providing them with material and moral support.

=== Family ===
Married, wife Oksana, daughter Mariia.

== Creativity ==
He creates in realistic and modern styles; in the fields of graphics, easel, decorative and monumental painting, iconography, and sculpture.

He is the creator of a number of monuments, including: the mosaic panel "Terebovlia-900" (1997, in collaboration with Merited Painter of Ukraine Dmytro Shainoha and People's Painter of Ukraine Bohdan Tkachyk; 34 square meters, smalt), a memorial plaque to ATO soldier V. Semchuk and monuments to the Heavenly Hundred (both 2014), "Fighters for the Freedom of Ukraine" (2016; all in Terebovlia); the monument "Kalynova Proshcha. Saint Nicholas" in Zarvanytsia, Ternopil Raion (2017); the sculptural composition "The Fire of the Fierce Does Not Burn" in Ternopil (2021). From 2024, he has been working on the Memorial Complex "In Memory of the Victims of the Holodomor" in Terebovlia, where a decorative information plaque was installed in the same year.

A painting by painter Mykola Shevchuk entitled "Ya zh tebe kupala hirkymy slozamy..." was included in the textbook "Ukrainian Literature. 11th Grade" in 2011. The painting is used in this edition as an illustration accompanying the study of the work of poet Vasyl Stus.

In 2017, a delegation of priests from the Ukrainian Greek Catholic Church presented Pope Francis with an icon of Christ Not Made by Hands, which Mykola Shevchuk painted during the plein air event "Vikno u Nebo. Zarvanytsia-2017".

Some of his works are kept in the collections of the Kyiv Municipal Art Gallery, the Ternopil Art and Local History Museums, the Bohdan Lepkyi Museum in Berezhany, Dubno Castle, the Museum of Carpathian Art in Ivano-Frankivsk, the Museum of Artistic Crafts of Yavoriv Raion in Ivano-Frankove, and the Museum of Contemporary Art at Wawel in Kraków.

Among his major works are: "Khlib ta sil" (1992), "Kharakternyk", "Rusiavu kosu chesala" (both – 1994), "Vazhke nebo kniazhykh muriv" (1995), "Ya zh tebe kupala hirkymy slozamy" (1997), "Nova radist" (1999), "Prykhylylosia nebo", "Ya ne nezduzhaiu, nivroku", "Serpnevyi spohad vid 13-ho lita" (all – 2013).

Creative credo – "Created in the image and likeness of God – we are obliged to do things that are pleasing to Him".

=== Exhibitions and plein airs ===
From 1993, he has participated in regional, national, and international exhibitions of painting, graphic art, and sculpture. Solo exhibitions have been held in Ternopil (1995, 1997, 2010, 2014–2015, 2025), Terebovlia (2005, 2016), Rivne, Ostroh (Rivne Oblast; both in 2014), Kyiv (2018), Dubno, Berezhany, Smyha (all in 2019), Zbarazh (2019,, 2021 2021, 2021), and Ivano-Frankove (2024).

Organizer and director of a number of art symposiums and plein air workshops:

- International plein air painting event "StareNove Misto. Terebovlia" (2012–2013),
- All-Ukrainian Interfaith Charitable Painting Plein Air "Bozha Stopa. Pochaiv-2012",
- All-Ukrainian symposium on stone "Voda z-pid kamenia. Terebovlia 2013",
- All-Ukrainian charity plein air painting event in support of Ukraine's defenders, "Tobi, Bohorodytse. Zarvanytsia-2015",
- All-Ukrainian charity plein air painting event in support of Ukraine's defenders, "Baida-SICH. Vyshnivets-2015",
- All-Ukrainian charity icon painting and painting plein air in support of the defenders of Ukraine "Vikno v Nebo. Zarvanytsia-2016–2019",
- Initiator and organizer of the First All-Ukrainian Sculpture Symposium "Navily Bohu. Zarvanytsia-2017",
- Participant in the charitable painting of Ukraine's first military chapel on Mount Lysnia on the occasion of the 100th anniversary of the battle between the Ukrainian Sich Riflemen and Russian occupiers (2016).

== Awards ==
- Mykhailo Boichuk Prize (2000),
- Laureate of the international art exhibition "Lviv Autumn Salon – Vysokyi Zamok" (2003) – for his original interpretation of folk pysanka art in contemporary painting,
- International award in the art exhibition-competition "Rizdviani dary. 2009–2010" – for a series of works on the theme of Christmas,
- Medal of the Ukrainian Orthodox Church-Kyivan Patriarchate "For Sacrifice and Love for Ukraine" (2015),
- Merited Painter of Ukraine (2015),
- Honorary citizen of Terebovlia (2015),
- Laureate of the "Person of the Year of Ternopil Oblast-2015" competition (2015),
- Awarded the jubilee order "Great Ukraine. 25 Years of Independence" (2016),
- Decorations of the President of Ukraine for Humanitarian Participation in the Anti-Terrorist Operation (2016),
- Certificate of appreciation from the administration of the Ukrainian Catholic Archeparchy of Ternopil–Zboriv (2015, 2016, 2017, 2018, 2019),
- Medal of the Orthodox Church of Ukraine "For Sacrifice and Love for Ukraine" (2021),
- Badge "Honorary Distinction of the Commander of the 44th Artillery Brigade "Hetman Danylo Apostol"” (2021),
- Order "For Volunteer Activity" (2021),
- Brothers Lepky Prize (2023).

== Bibliography ==
- Шевчук Микола Степанович // Мистці Тернопільщини. Частина 1. Образотворче мистецтво: бібліографічний покажчик / департамент культури, релігій та національностей Тернопільської облдержадміністарації, Тернопільська обласна університецька наукова бібліотека; укладач Миськів В.; вступна стаття І. Дуда; керівник проєкту та науковий редактор Вітенко В.; редактор Жовтко Г. — Тернопіль : Підручники і посібники, 2015. — С. 260–262. — ISBN 978-966-07-2936-0.
- Кузик Л. Вимальований світ Миколи Шевчука // Воля. — 1999. — 20 берез.
- Творчі обрії Миколи Шевчука // Воля. — 2005. — 4 листоп. — С. 4.
- Шот М. І зійшли писанки на полотно // Вільне життя плюс. — 2010. — 16 квіт. — С. 8.
- Новіцька К. «…бо люди цікавіші, аніж мексиканські серіали» // Свобода. — 2010. — 9 черв. — С. 3. — (В гостях у майстра).
- Заморська Л. «Ікона — міра глибини душі…» // Rіа плюс. — 2010. — 10 листоп. — С. 18. — (Віч-на-віч).
- Деркач З. Іконописець з українською душею // Сільський господар плюс Тернопільщина. — 2021. — No. 15 (14 квіт.). — С. 10.
- Чечель Л. Микола Шевчук: «Щоб бути патріотом, треба знати, чим гордитися» // Культура і життя. — 2018. — No. 28 (13 лип.). — С. 12.

Інші видання:

- Шевчук Микола Степанович // Тернопільська обласна організація Національної спілки художників України : [альбом- каталог]. — Т., [2007?]. — С. 55.
- Шевчук Микола Степанович : [біогр. довідка] // Тернопільській обласній організації Національної спілки художників України 20 :[альбом-каталог]. — Т., [2003?]. — С. 100.
- Живопис. Скульптура : каталог музейної збірки. Ч. 1 / Терноп. обл. худож. музей ; упоряд. О. М. Войтович [та ін.] ; авт. вступ. ст. І. Дуда ; за ред. І. М. Дуди. — Т. : Астон, 2007. — 144 с., [64] с. іл. кольор.
- Шевчук М. Християнин [Образотворчий матеріал] // Живопис, графіка, скульптура, декоративне мистецтво : [кат. виставки]. — Т., [2005?]. — С. 8 : іл.
- Шевчук М. С. Іоан Хреститель Василіанський [Образотворчий матеріал] : картон, олія : [репродукція] // Тернопільській обласній організації Національної спілки художників України 20 : [альбом-каталог]. — Т., [2003?]. — С. [101].
- Шевчук М. С. Розсипались зорями ночі, 2006 [Образотворчий матеріал] : полотно, олія ; 60х80 см : [репродукція] // Тернопільська обласна організація Національної спілки художників України : [альбом-каталог]. — Т., [2007?]. — С. 55.
- Шевчук М. С. Сонцестояння сьомого року, 2010 [Образотворчий матеріал] : дерево, паволока, левкас, авт. техніка ; 52х95 см : [репродукція] // Тернопільська обласна організація Національної спілки художників України, 1983—2010 : [альбом- каталог]. — Т., [2011?]. — С. 20.
