= Bohdan Tkachyk =

Ukrainian painter (born 1951)

- Богдан Іванович Ткачик
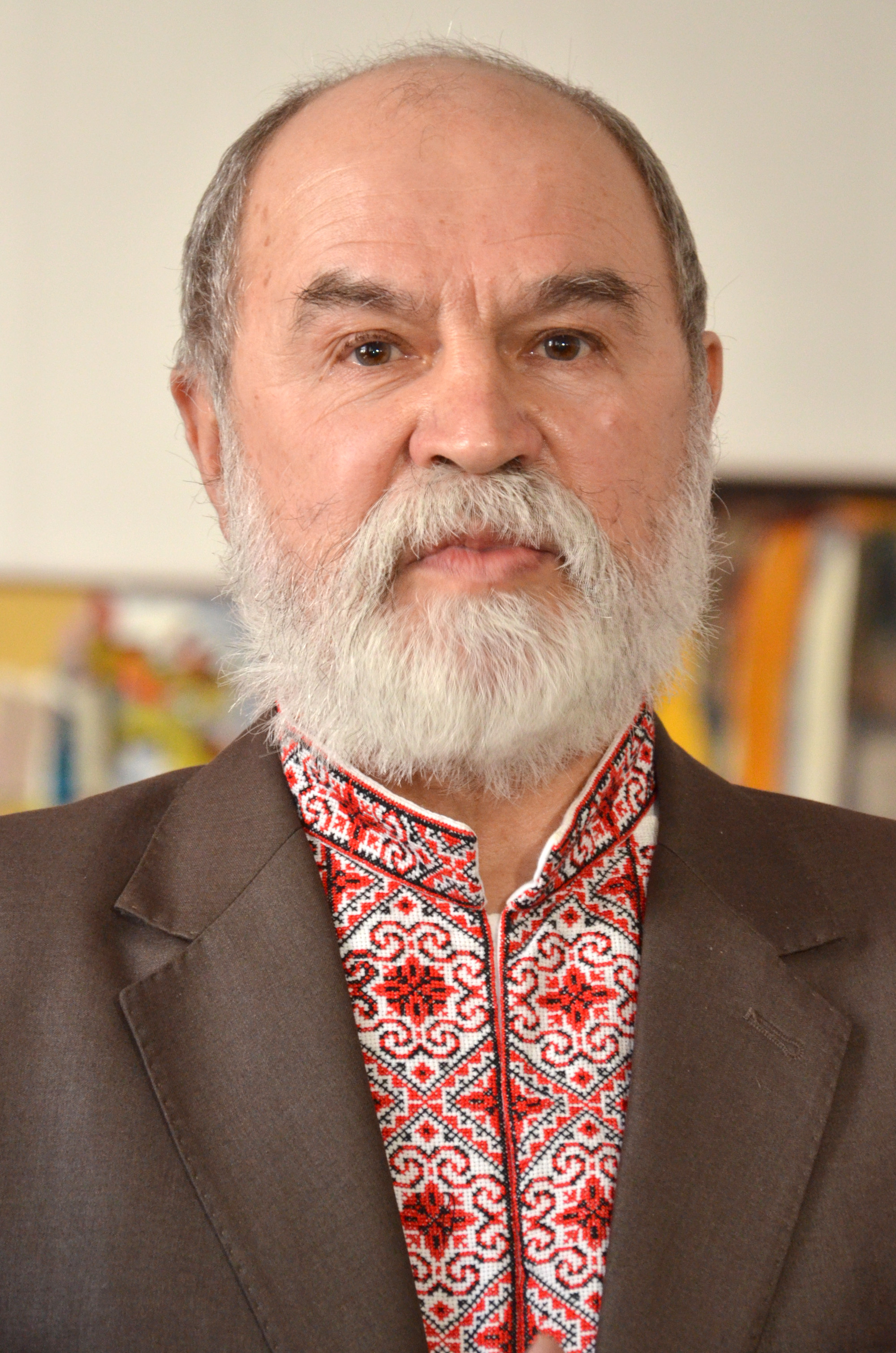
- Born: 12 August 1951 (age 75); Sambir, now Lviv Oblast, Ukraine
- Education: Lviv School of Applied Arts
- Occupations: Painter, public figure
- Awards: People's Artist of Ukraine

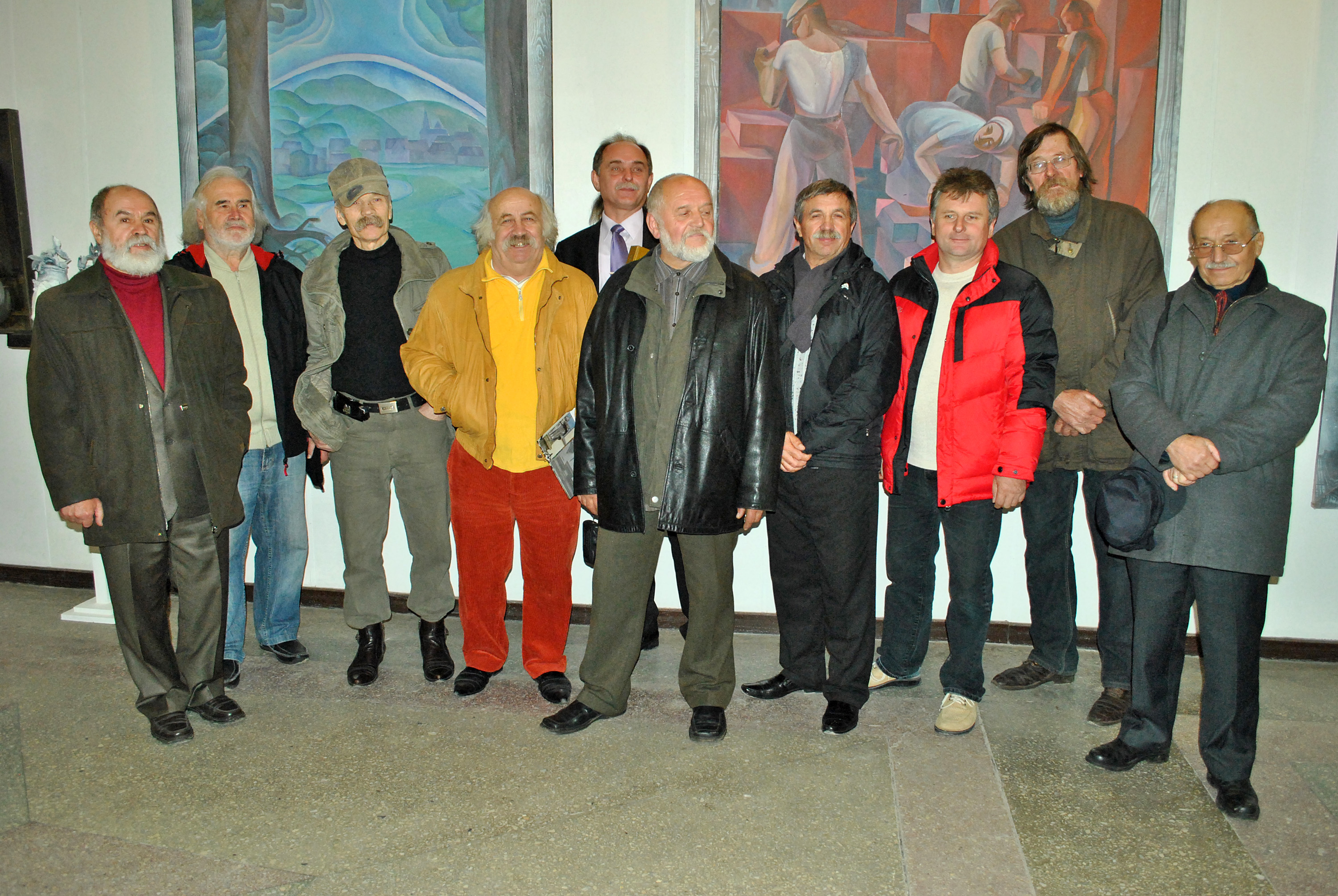
Laureates of the Mykhailo Boichuk Prize. The first on the left is Bohdan Tkachyk.

Bohdan Tkachyk (Ukrainian: Богдан Іванович Ткачик; born 12 August 1951 in Sambir, Lviv Oblast) is a Ukrainian painter, public figure. He is the husband of Hanna Tkachyk and father of Solomiia Tkachyk. He served as a deputy in the Ternopil Oblast Council from 1990 to 1994. He was a member of the National Union of Artists of Ukraine from 1982.

== Biography ==
He received his initial art education in 1961–1962 at the Sambir Children's Art Studio under the guidance of Mykola Prokopenko. He studied at the Shevchenko State Art School in Kyiv (1963–1970) and at the monumental painting department of the Lviv School of Applied Arts (1970–1971, now the College of Decorative and Applied Arts).

From 1973, he lived in Ternopil, working in the art and production workshops of the Art Fund of the Ukrainian SSR, and from 1978 in the regional art and design combine.

From 1975, he participant in group exhibitions in Dnipropetrovsk, Zaporizhzhia, Kyiv, Lviv, Bratislava (Slovakia), Sliven (Bulgaria), Ternopil; solo exhibitions in Lviv (1981), Ternopil (1986, 1991, 1994, 1996, 2001, 2006), Sambir (1986, 1991, 1994, 1996, 2001), Stryi (1986, 1991; both in the Lviv Oblast), Berezhany (1991), at the Andrey Sheptytsky National Museum of Lviv and the National Union of Artists of Ukraine (Kyiv; both in 2001), at the National University of Kyiv-Mohyla Academy and the Ivan Kavaleridze Museum (Kyiv, both in 2002).

From 1989 he was a member of the Political Leadership of the Regional Council of the People's Movement of Ukraine; from 1990 he was a member of the Grand Council of the People's Movement of Ukraine.

From 1992 to 2000, he was the head of the Ternopil branch of the National Union of Artists of Ukraine.

== Creativity ==
He works in the field of easel (landscape, still life, portrait, genre compositions) and monumental (tempera, painting) painting.

=== Easel works (paintings) ===
- "Miy Did" (1975)
- "Zemlia Podilska" (1981)
- "Kolys u Dytinstvi" (1985)
- Portraits of Ivanna Blazhkevych (1975), Stanislav Liudkevych (1977), Mykhailo Boichuk (1983), Mykola Vinhranovskyi (1983), Pablo Picasso (all — 1983), Mykola Levytskyi (1984), Mykola Kolessa (both — 1984), Les Kurbas (1985), Hryhir Tiutiunnyk (1986), Borys Demkiv (both — 1986), Taras Shevchenko (1988), Ihor Gereta (both — 1988)
- "Khrystos Voskres — Voskresla Ukraina" (1995)
- "Hoshiv Rizdvyanyi"
- "Doroha do Neba" and others

=== Monumental paintings ===
- "Zemlia Podilska" (1980, Khorostkiv Sugar Factory)
- "Troiandy i Vynohrad" (1982—1983, Zbruch Sanatorium-Preventorium in Husiatyn)
- "Vikno do Znan" (1985, Ternopil Central City Library)
- "Istoriia Medytsyny" (1987, 2nd City Hospital of Ternopil)

Tkachyk's works illustrate a number of books by Yaroslav Sachko and other authors from Ternopil.

=== Icon paintings ===
Bohdan Tkachyk, among others, painted the following churches:

- Mural painting of the Church of the Exaltation of the Holy Cross (1993, Ternopil);
- Icon painting of the church in the village of Yusynivka, in the Khmelnytskyi Oblast (60 icons, 1996);
- Icon painting of the church in the village of Buhliv, Kremenets Raion, Ternopil Oblast (54 icons, 1997);
- Icon painting of the St. Demetrius church in the village of Novyky, Ternopil Raion, Ternopil Oblast (58 icons, 2006).

== Exhibitions ==
The works are exhibited at the Ternopil Regional Art Museum, the Ivano-Frankivsk Regional Art Museum, and the Sambir Children's Art Gallery; They are stored in the Lviv National Art Museum, in the city of Baturyn in the Chernihiv Oblast, in Zbarazh Castle, in the Ternopil Oblast Museum and the Ternopil Regional Art Museum, and in private collections in Ukraine and abroad.

== Awards ==
- Mykhailo Boichuk Prize (1996),
- Merited Painter of Ukraine (1999),
- Order for Courage, 3rd class (2009),
- Brothers Lepky Prize (2015).
- People's Artist of Ukraine (2016).
- Order of Saints Cyril and Methodius of the Ukrainian Orthodox Church–Kyivan Patriarchate (UOC-KP).

== Bibliography ==
- (in Ukrainian) Дуда І., Щербак Л., Ткачик Богдан Іванович // Ternopil Encyclopedic Dictionary: in 4 v. / editorial board: H. Yavorskyi and other, Ternopil: "Zbruch", 2008, V. 3: П—Я, S. 449. — ISBN 978-966-528-279-2.
- Ігор Фарина. Новели Богдана Ткачика на полотні // TeNews.te.ua. — 2016. — 19 серпня.
