= Saints Peter and Paul Church, Terebovlia =

Ukrainian church in Terebovlia, Ukraine

Saints Peter and Paul Church
- Костел святих апостолів Петра і Павла
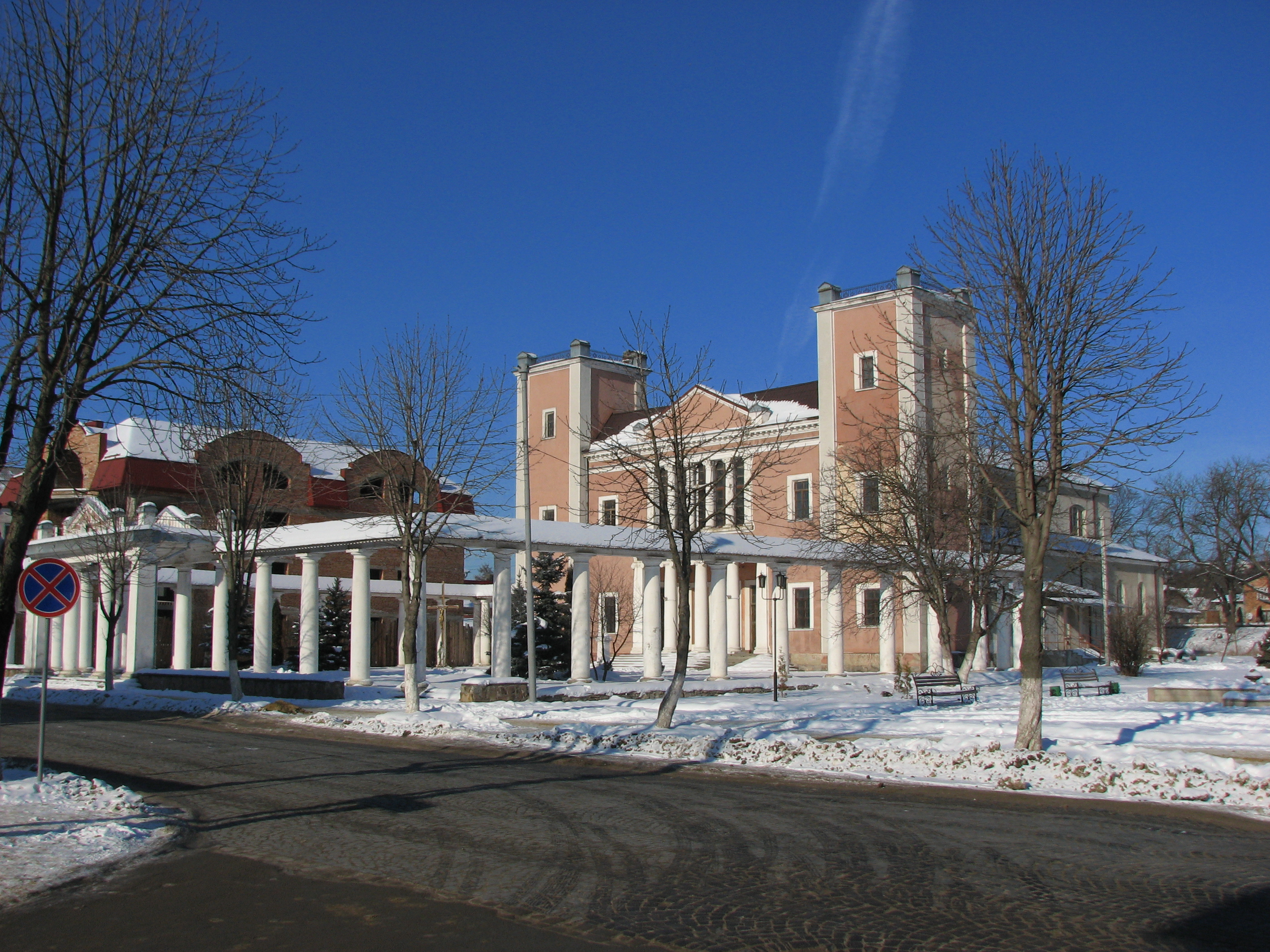

- Location within Ternopil Oblast

Religion
- Affiliation: Roman Catholic Church

Location
- Location: Terebovlia
- Interactive map of Saints Peter and Paul Church
- Coordinates: 49°17′55.9″N 25°41′41.0″E

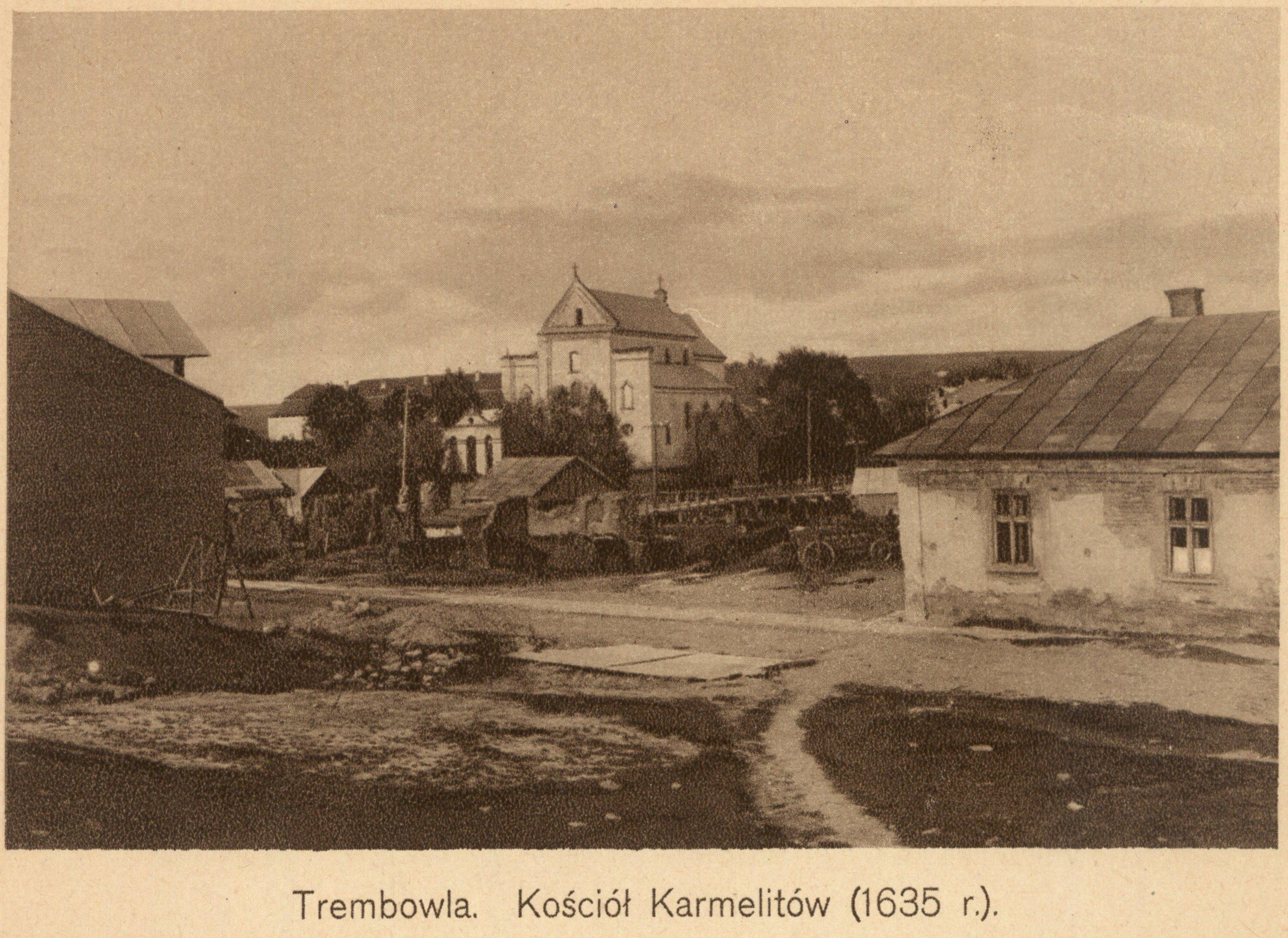
The former Church of the Assumption in Terebovlia

Saints Peter and Paul Church (Ukrainian: Костел святих апостолів Петра і Павла) is a Roman Catholic Church in Terebovlia, in the Ternopil Oblast.

== History ==
In the 14th century, there was a wooden Roman Catholic church in Terebovlia, built on the left bank of the Hnizna River, first mentioned in 1396. The parish was established in 1423 at the new Church of the Assumption, also wooden, built on the right bank of the Hnizna River. Both churches were founded by King Władysław II Jagiełło. In 1627, a church and monastery of the Carmelite Monastery were built in the city. In 1784, the Carmelite church became a parish church, as the previous wooden parish church burned down (according to another source, the fire took place in the early 19th century, and the move in the 18th century was dictated by the poor technical condition of the temple). From the 1890s to 1917, Masses were celebrated in the Uniate church, and in 1917-1919 in a temporary chapel due to the poor condition of the Carmelite church. From 1919, the Carmelite church once again served as a parish church. Between 1924 and 1927, thanks to the efforts of the then parish priest, Eustachy Jełowiecki, the present St. Peter and Paul Church was built. In 1928, it was consecrated by the Archbishop of Lviv, Bolesław Twardowski.

Before 1939, the parish had 5,200 parishioners, covering not only the town but also several surrounding villages. After World War II, Terebovlia found itself within the borders of the USSR. The communist authorities turned the church into a granary, then a cultural center and concert hall. It was returned to the faithful in 1992. Pastoral ministry in the parish is carried out by diocesan priests, assisted by the Sisters of the Presentation, who have their convent here.

However, the church and monastery of the Carmelite Fathers were not returned and were handed over to the Ukrainian Autocephalous Orthodox Church.
