= Smyha =

Rural locality in Rivne Oblast, Ukraine

Smyha Смига
- Rural settlement
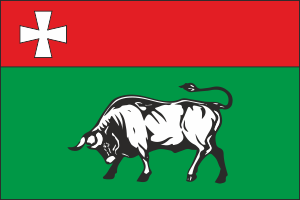
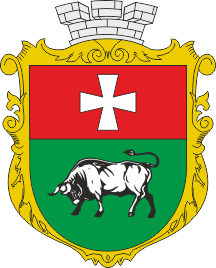
- Flag Coat of arms

- Location of Smyha in Ukraine Smyha (Ukraine)
- Coordinates: 50°14′24″N 25°45′57″E
- Country: Ukraine
- Oblast: Rivne Oblast
- Raion: Dubno Raion
- Hromada: Smyha settlement hromada
- Founded: 1861
- Town status: 1980

Government
  - Town Head: Oleksandr Fedorov

Area
  - Total: 3.417 km^{2} (1.319 sq mi)
- Elevation: 224 m (735 ft)

Population (2001)
  - Total: 3,015
  - Density: 882.4/km^{2} (2,285/sq mi)
- Time zone: UTC+2 (EET)
  - Summer (DST): UTC+3 (EEST)
- Postal code: 35680
- Area code: +380 3656
- Website: http://rada.gov.ua/

Smyha (Ukrainian: Смига) is a rural settlement in Dubno Raion, Rivne Oblast, western Ukraine. Its population was 3,015 as of the 2001 Ukrainian Census. Current population: 2,560 (2022 estimate)., 2693 (01/01/2025).

== History ==
The settlement was first founded in 1861 as the village of Kenneberg (Ukrainian: Кеннеберг).. On a German map from World War I 1914-1918 map square R41, it is marked as "Kol. Smyha". It acquired the status of an urban-type settlement in 1980.

Until 26 January 2024, Smyha was designated urban-type settlement. On this day, a new law entered into force which abolished this status, and Smyha became a rural settlement.

== Notable residents ==
- Mykola Shevchuk (born 1965), Ukrainian painter, graphic artist, sculptor, icon painter, teacher, volunteer

== Images ==
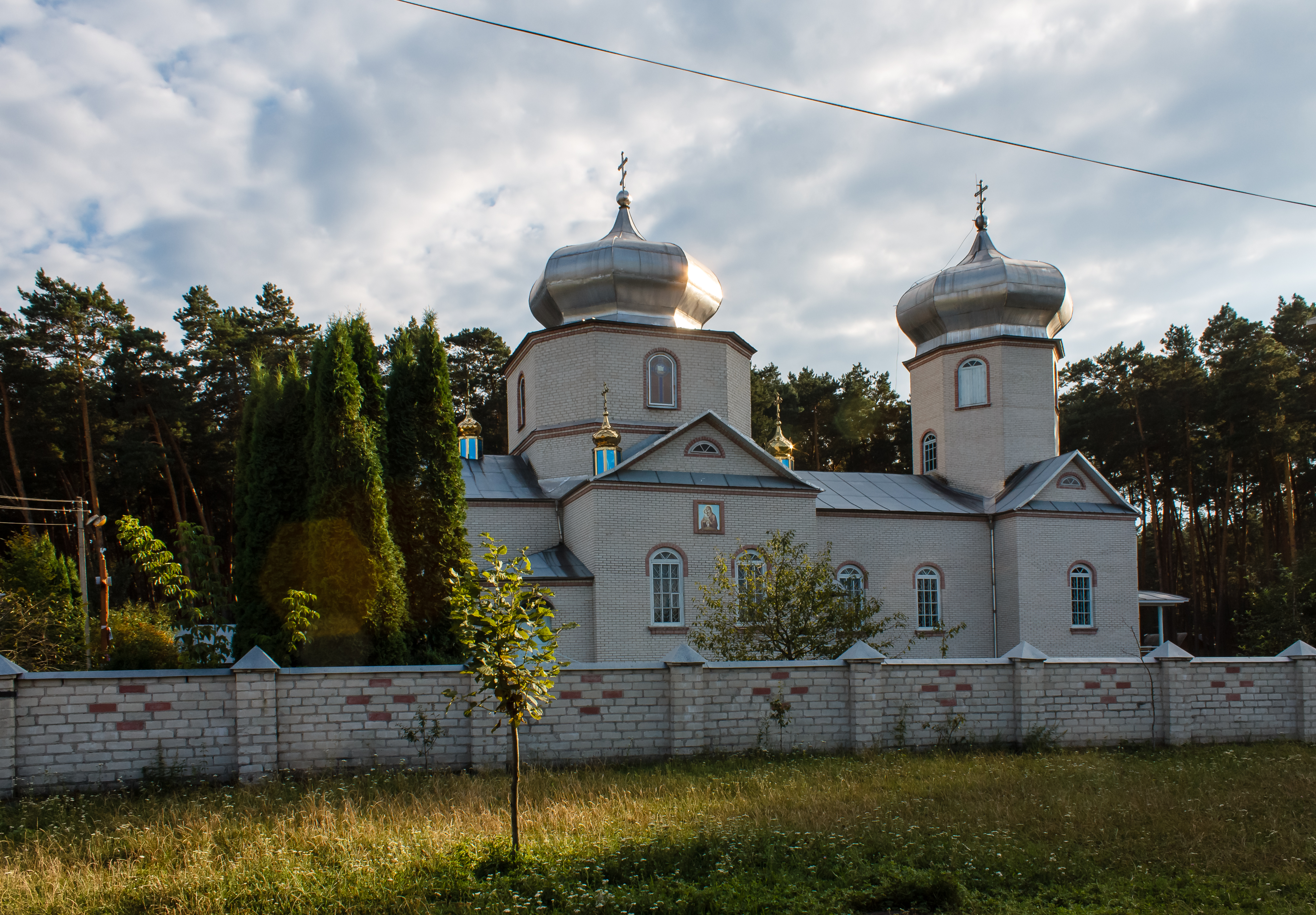
Church, 1991

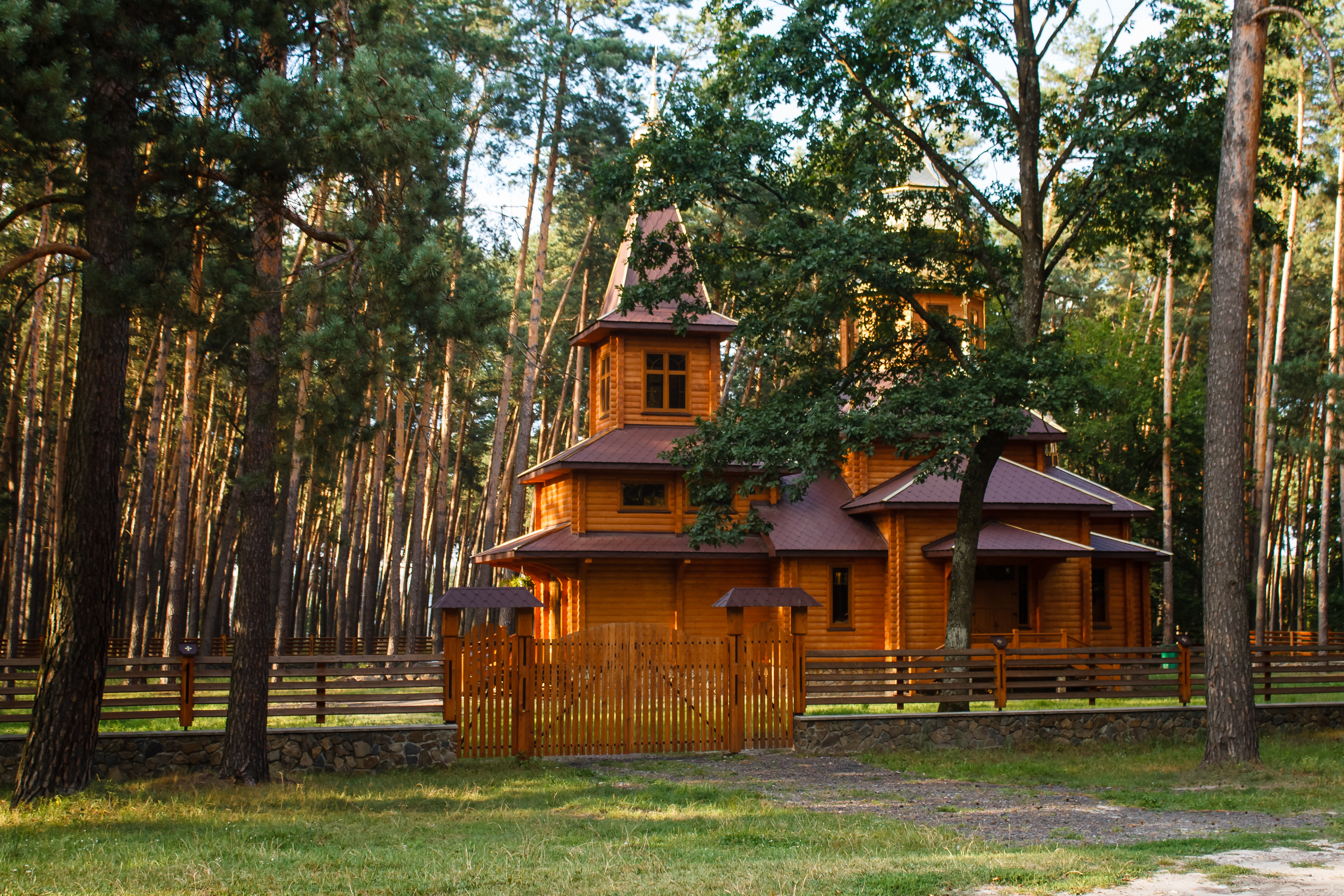
Church, 2013

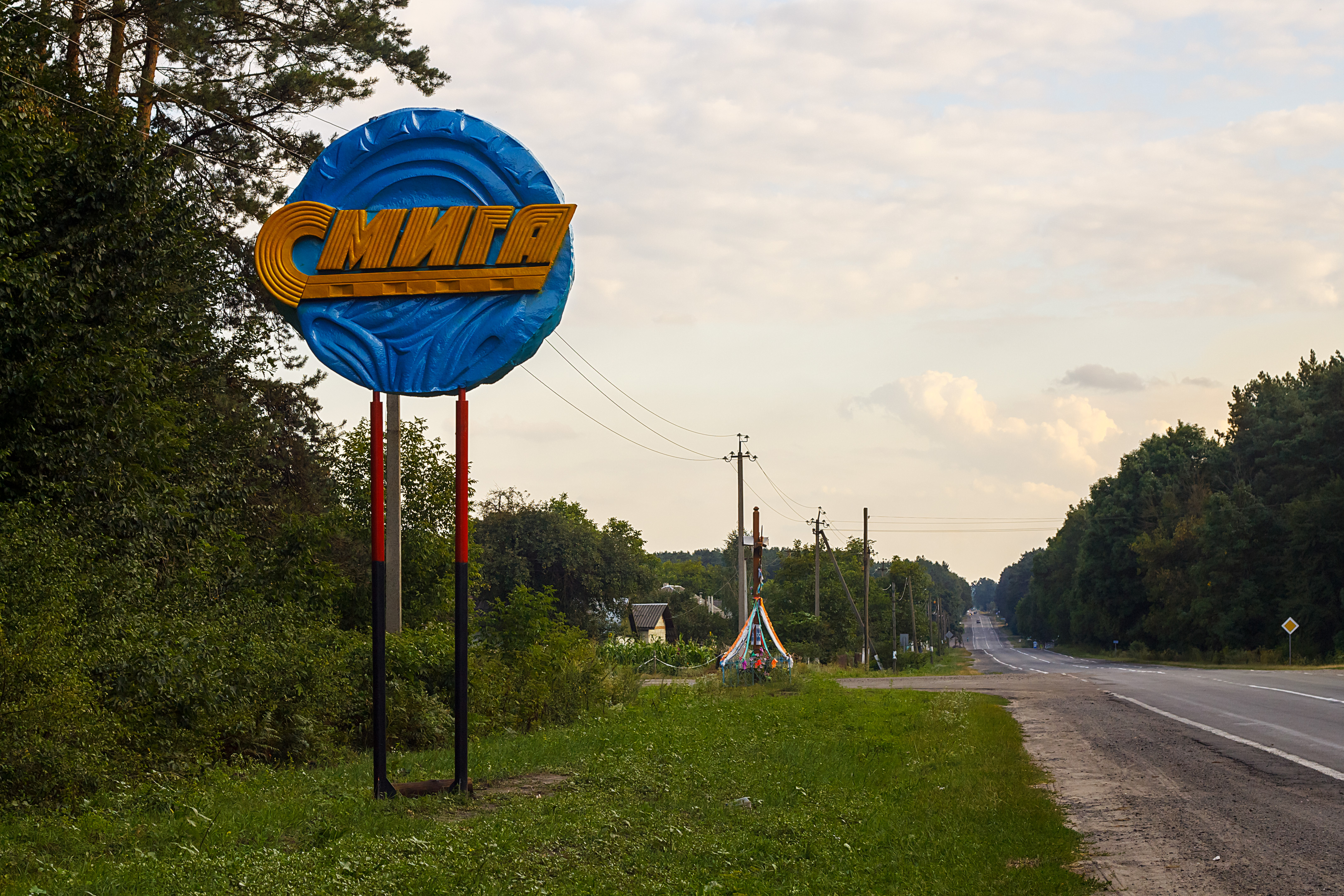
