= Saint Nicholas Church, Terebovlia =

Ukrainian church in Terebovlia, Ukraine

Saint Nicholas Church
- Церква Святого Миколая
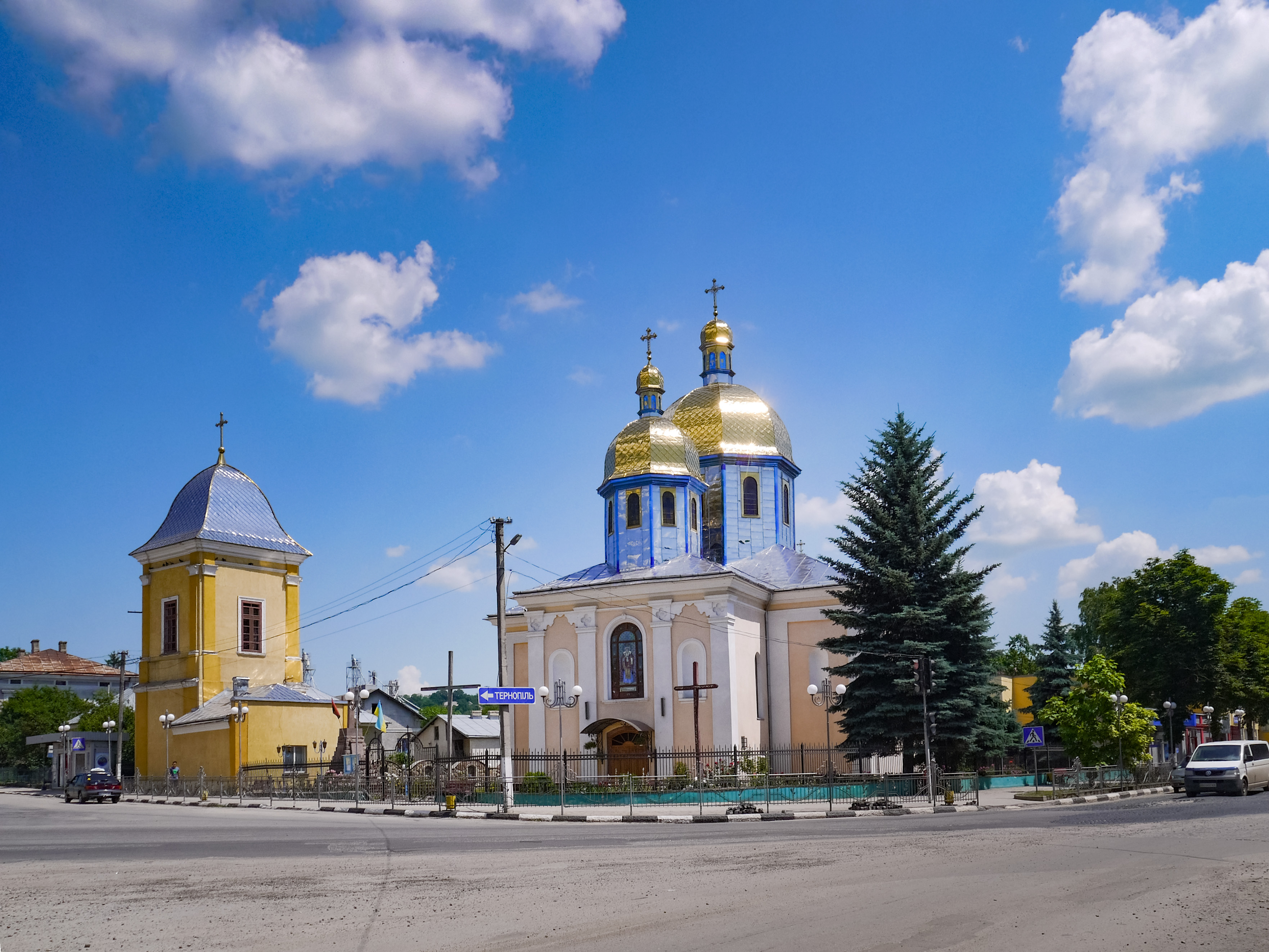

- Location within Ternopil Oblast

Religion
- Affiliation: Ukrainian Greek Catholic Church

Location
- Location: Terebovlia
- Coordinates: 49°17′59.9″N 25°41′26.0″E

Immovable Monument of National Significance of Ukraine
- Official name: Миколаївська церква (мур.) (St Nicholas Church (stone))
- Type: Architecture
- Reference no.: 190045

Saint Nicholas Church (Ukrainian: Церква Святого Миколая) is a Ukrainian Greek Catholic Church from the 16th century (rebuilt in the 18th and 19th centuries) in Terebovlia, in the Ternopil Oblast. It is an architectural monument of national significance.

== History ==
The temple was built in the 16th century. It was rebuilt in 1734 and served as a defensive structure. Another reconstruction, not including the presbytery, was carried out in 1896. Around the beginning of the 21st century, the church underwent renovation. It belongs to the Ukrainian Greek Catholic Church.

== Architecture ==
The St. Nicholas Church is located near the town hall and the Carmelite church. Originally, it was a Gothic single-nave temple with a narthex and a polygonal presbytery, probably with a tower. After reconstruction in the 18th century, the church was surrounded by a wall with an entrance gate and a bell tower was erected. Defensive elements have been preserved in the presbytery.
