= Mariia Tymchuk =

Ukrainian master of decorative and applied arts (born 1989)

- Марія Миколаївна Тимчук
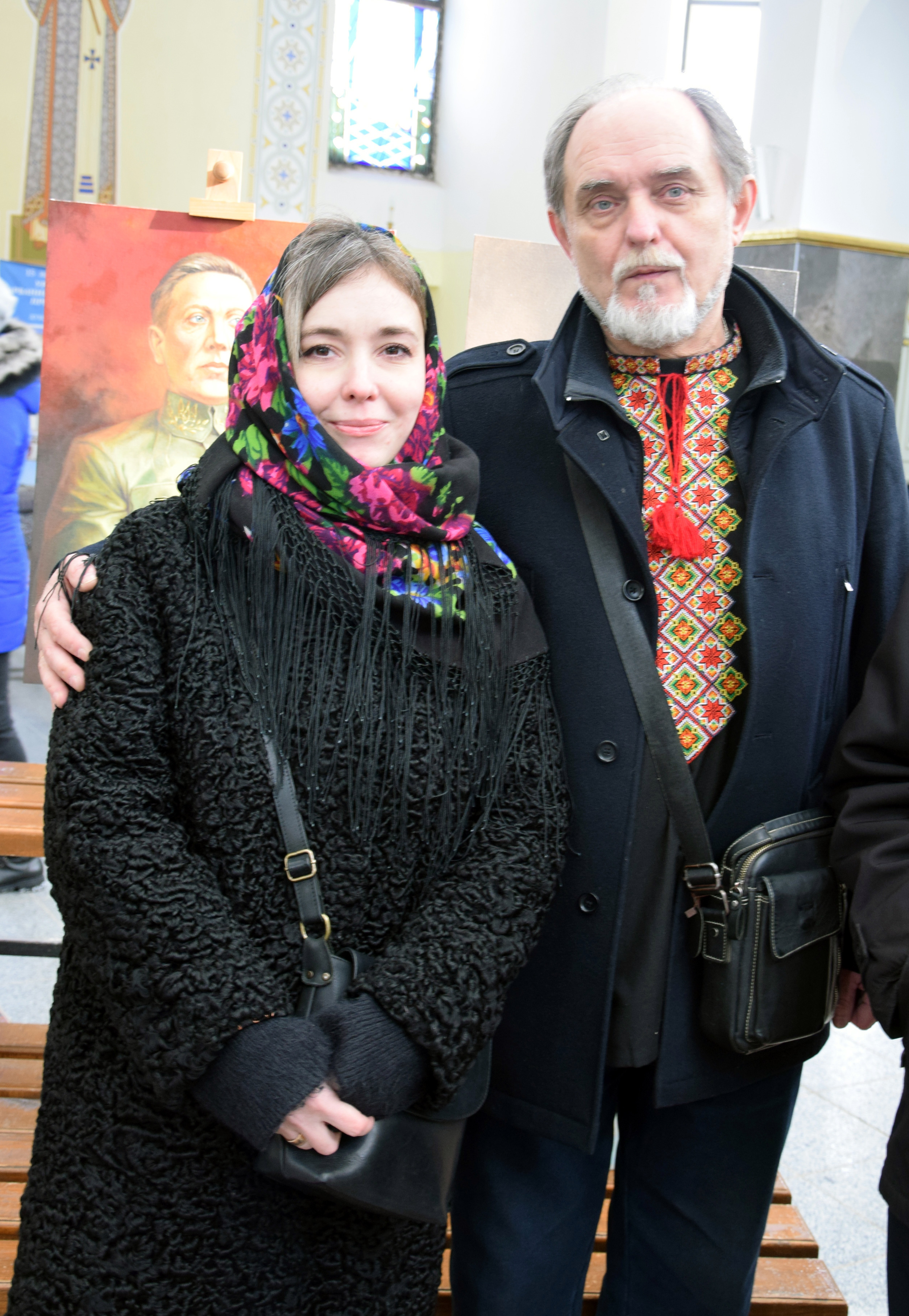
- The artist Maria Tymchuk with her father, the Merited Painter of Ukraine Mykola Shevchuk, during the All-Ukrainian art plein air event "To You, Mother of God!" at the Zarvanytsia Spiritual Center (2023)
- Born: 18 February 1989 (age 37); Terebovlia, Ternopil Oblast (now Ukraine)
- Education: Terebovlia Higher School of Culture, Kamianets-Podilskyi Ivan Ohiienko National University
- Occupations: Master of decorative and applied arts

Mariia Tymchuk (née Shevchuk; Ukrainian: Марія Миколаївна Тимчук; born 18 February 1989) is a Ukrainian master of decorative and applied arts. Daughter of Mykola Shevchuk.

== Biography ==
Maria Tymchuk was born on 18 February 1989 in Terebovlia, now Terebovlia Hromada, Ternopil Raion, Ternopil Oblast, Ukraine.

In 2008, she graduated from the Faculty of Fine Arts and Restoration at the Terebovlia Higher School of Culture, and in 2012, she graduated from the Kamianets-Podilskyi Ivan Ohiienko National University (teachers Nataliia Ursu and Borys Nehoda). Currently, she is a teacher in the Department of Decorative and Applied Arts at the Terebovlia College of Culture and Arts.

== Creativity ==
She paints in the genres of decorative painting, landscape, and iconography. He also paints artillery shell casings. She is the founder of the author's style of "rounded craquelures".

From 2010, Tymchuk has participated in plein air workshops, exhibitions, international festivals, and charity events. Solo exhibitions have been held in Ternopil (2010), Zbarazh (2021), and Berezhany (2024). Some of her works are kept in the collections of the Ternopil Regional Art Museum, Zbarazh Castle, the Bohdan Lepky Museum in Berezhany, and others. The artist's copy of the Theotokos of Terebovlia is in the private collection of Cardinal Pietro Parolin in the Vatican City.

Important works include:

- "Harbuzovyi natiurmort" (2015), "Soniakhy" (2018), "Pivonii" (2019), "Hrushi", "Pivnyky" (both 2020), «Pora irysiv», "Simeistvo tiulpaniv" (both 2021), "Zhorzhyny" (2022), "Vesnianyi podykh" (2023), "Sonechko", "Zarvanytska ikona Materi Bozhoi", "Icon of the Mother of God “Admiration”" (all 2024).

== Awards ==
- Olena Kulchytska Prize (2019);
- Scholarship of the President of Ukraine for young writers and artists (2022).

== Gallery ==
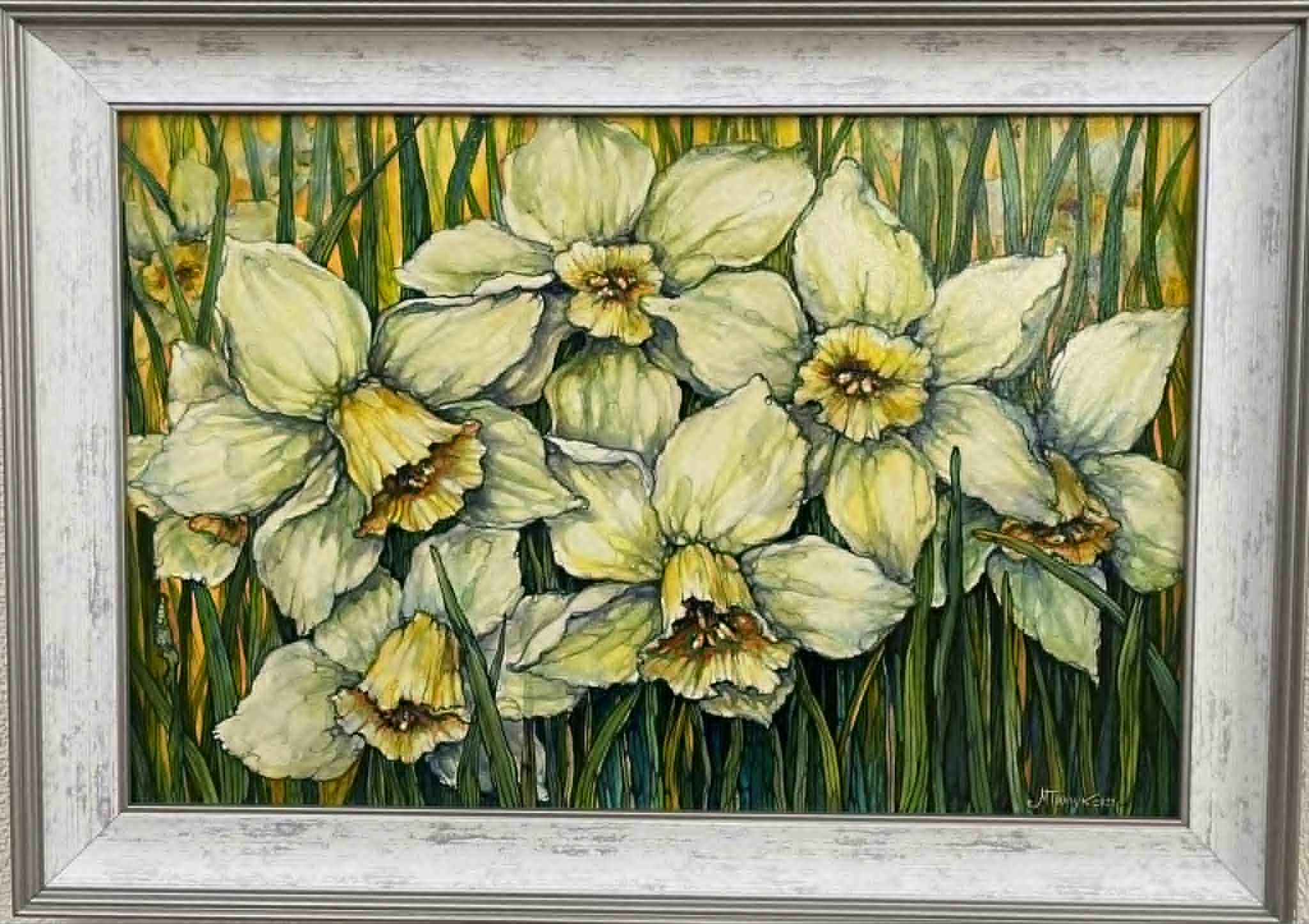
Vesniainyi Podykh, 2023

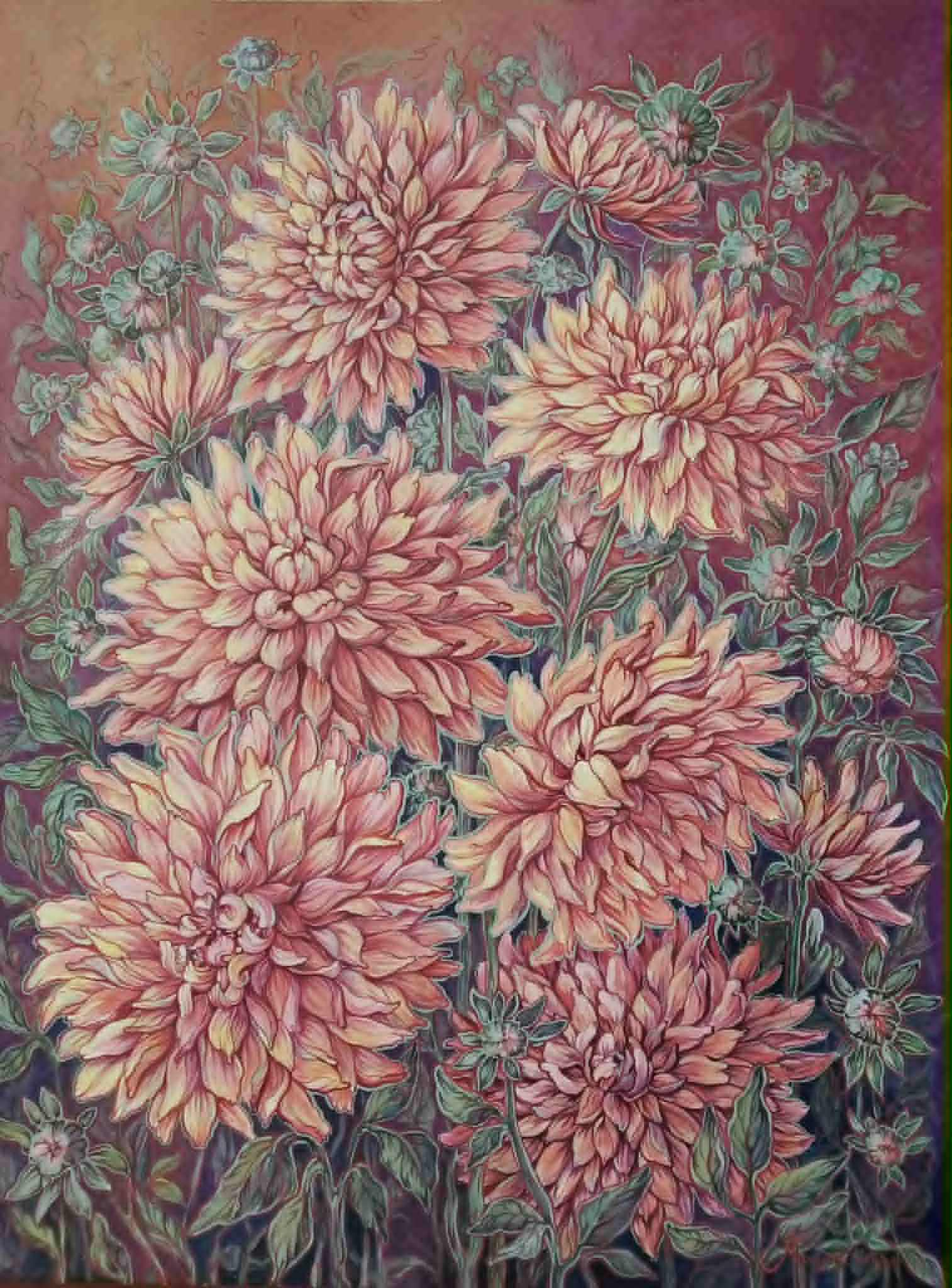
Zhorzhyny, 2021

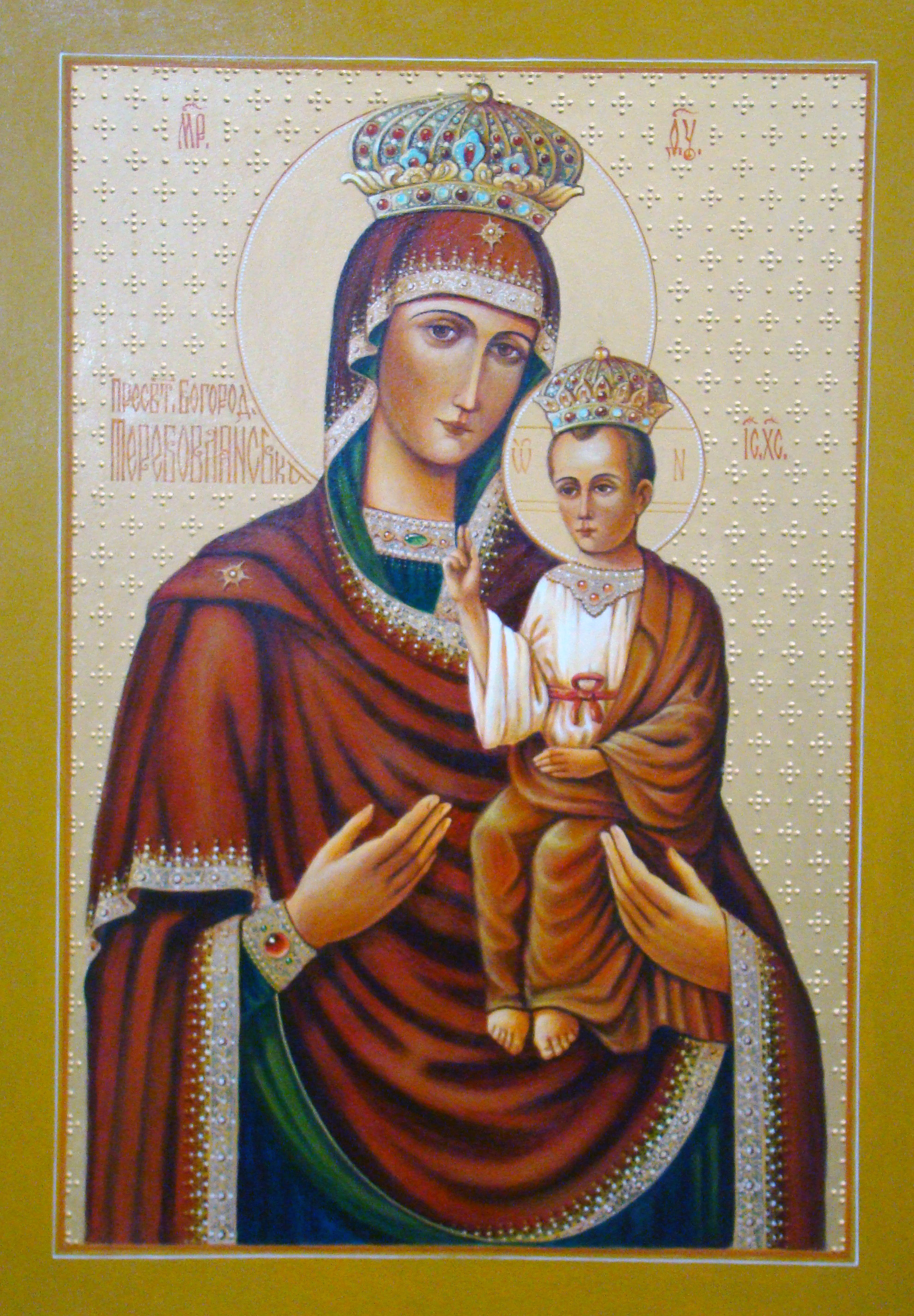
Copy of the Terebovlia Icon of the Mother of God, 2016

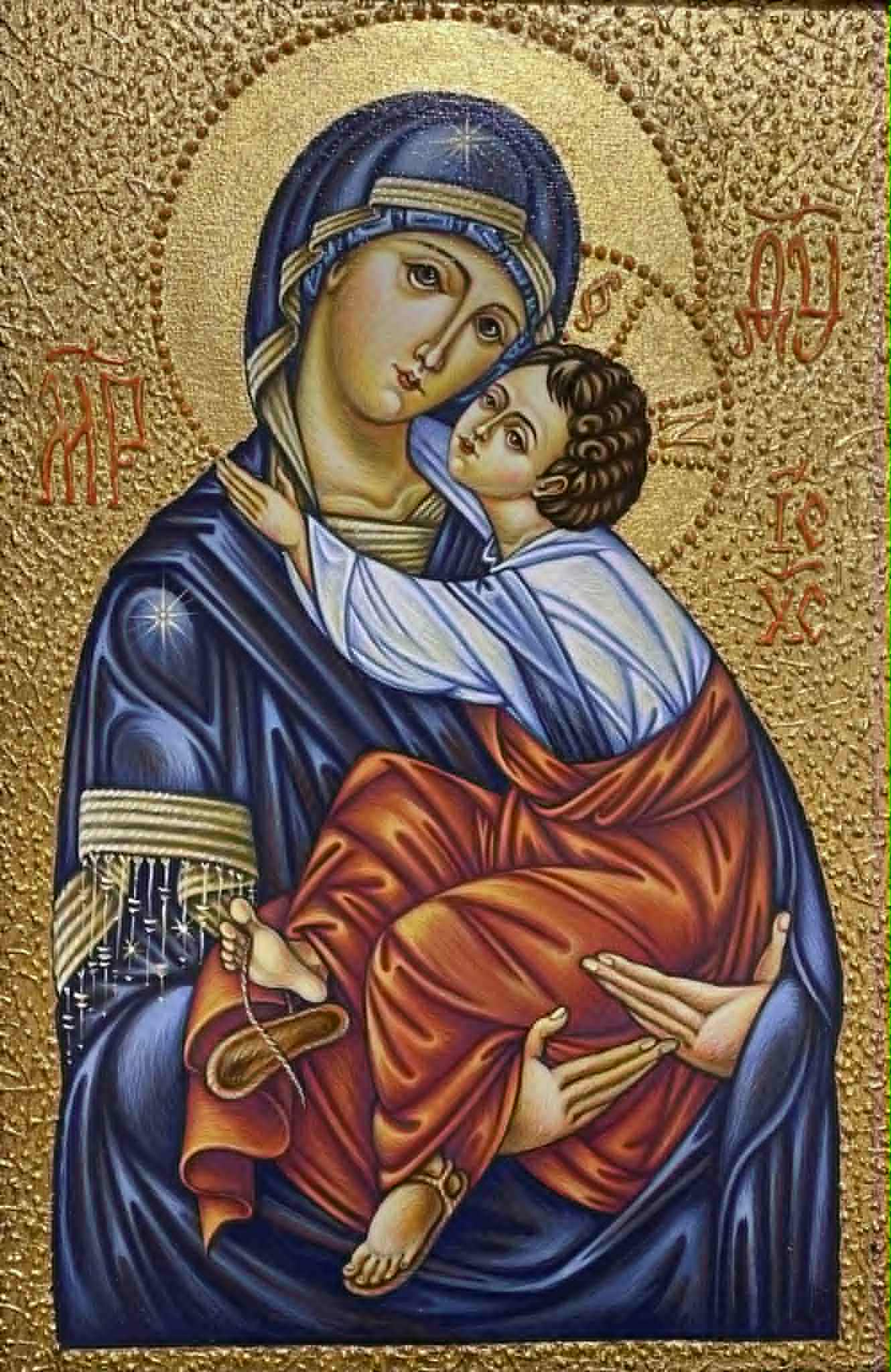
Eleusa icon, 2024

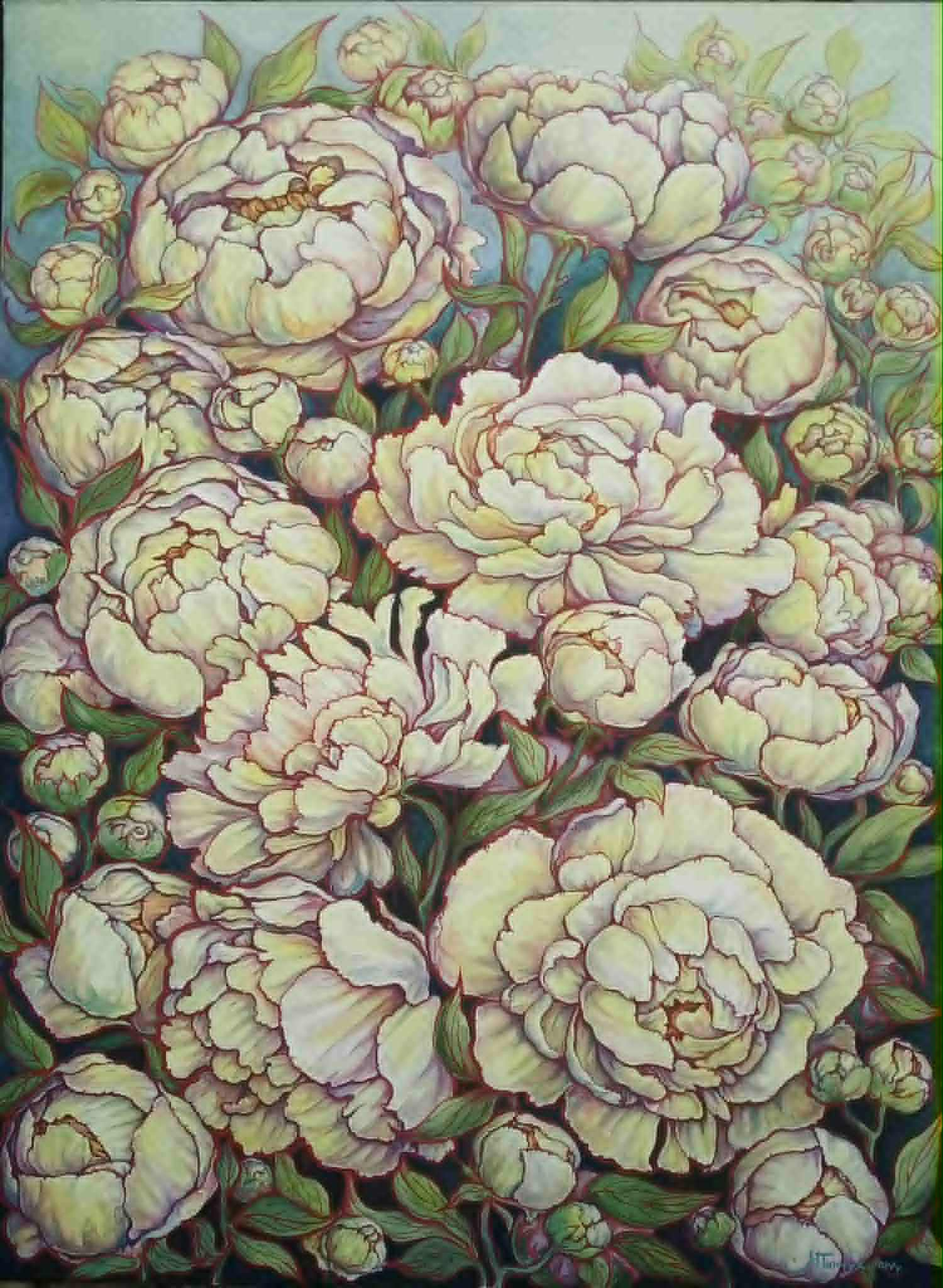
Pionova Pora, 2019

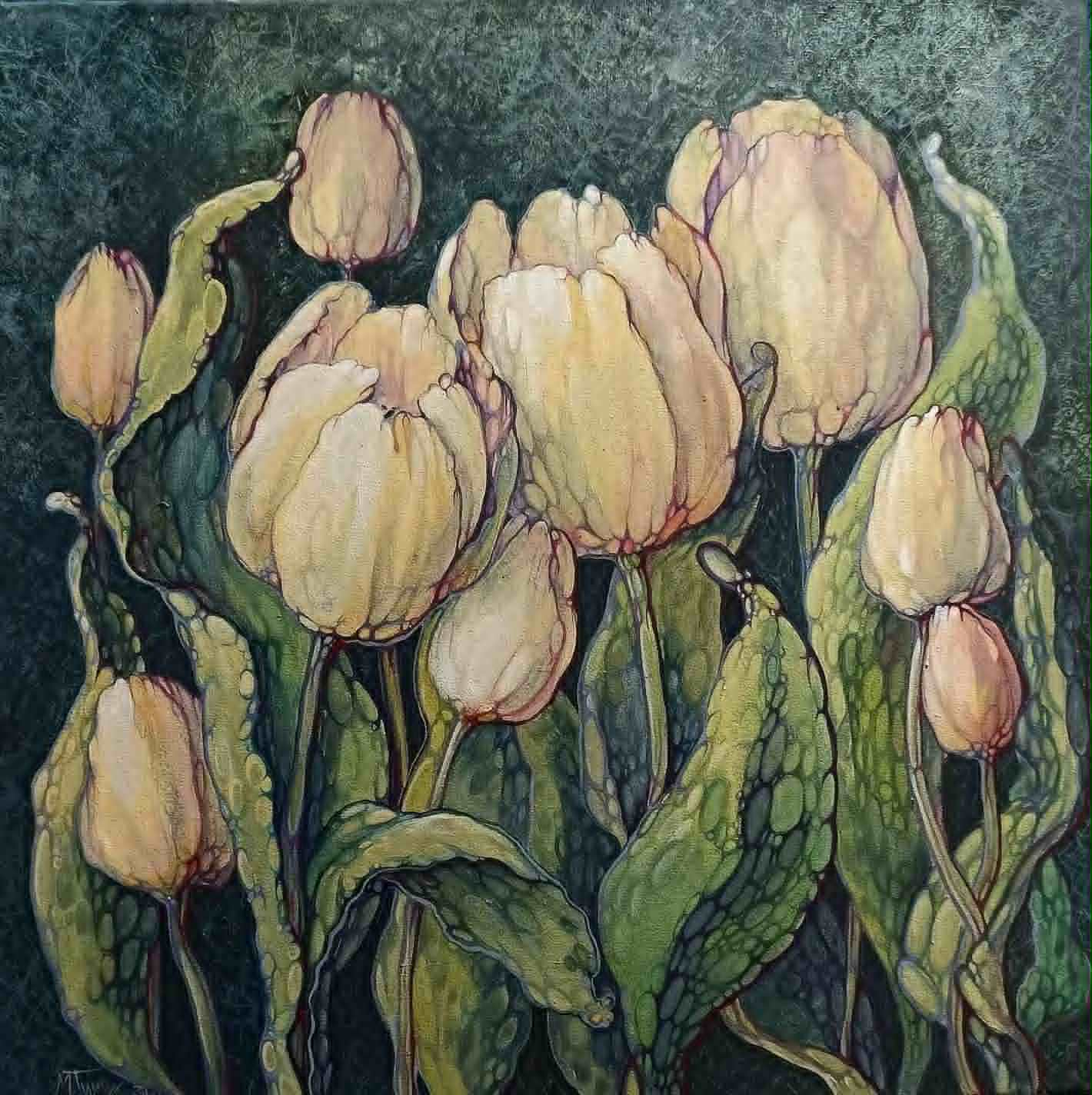
Simeistvo Tiulpanova, 2021

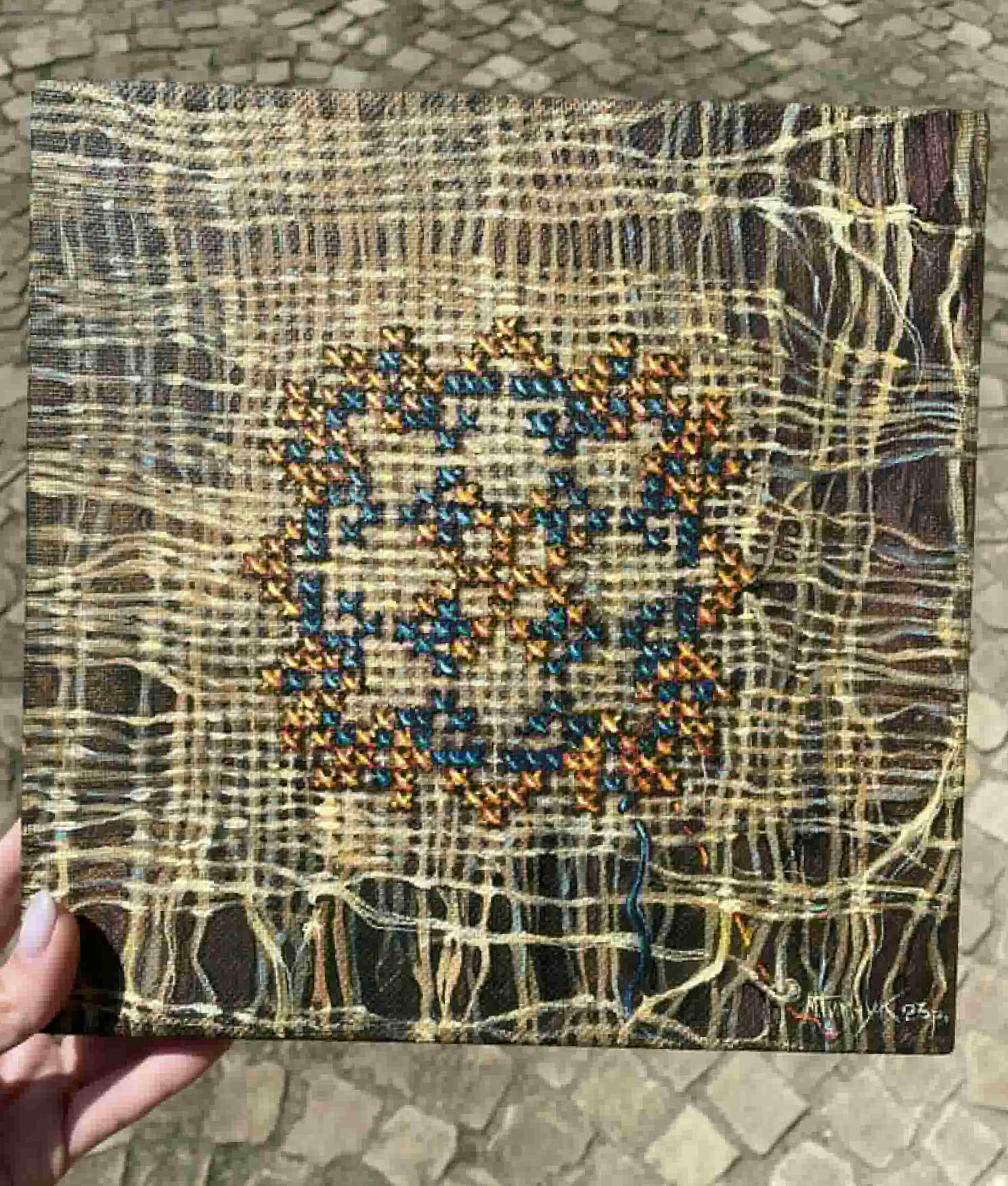
Symvol Ukrainy (imitation of text embroidery), 2023

== Bibliography ==
- Микола Шот (2016-03-03). "Художники писали обереги для бійців АТО". Урядовий кур'єр.
- Анна Золотнюк (2020-05-20). "«Хочу, аби мої квіти жили на полотнах», — теребовлянська художниця Марія Тимчук". Терен.
- Брездень Р. Намальовані квіти ніколи не в'януть // Вільне життя плюс. — 2022. — № 14 (23 лют.). — С. 9. — (Знай наших!).
- Бойчук Н. Квітковий дивограй Марічки Тимчук // Воля. — 2019, 8 листоп.
