= Church of the Exaltation of the Cross, Ternopil =

Church in Ternopil Oblast, Ukraine

Coordinates: 49.5510°N 25.5830°E

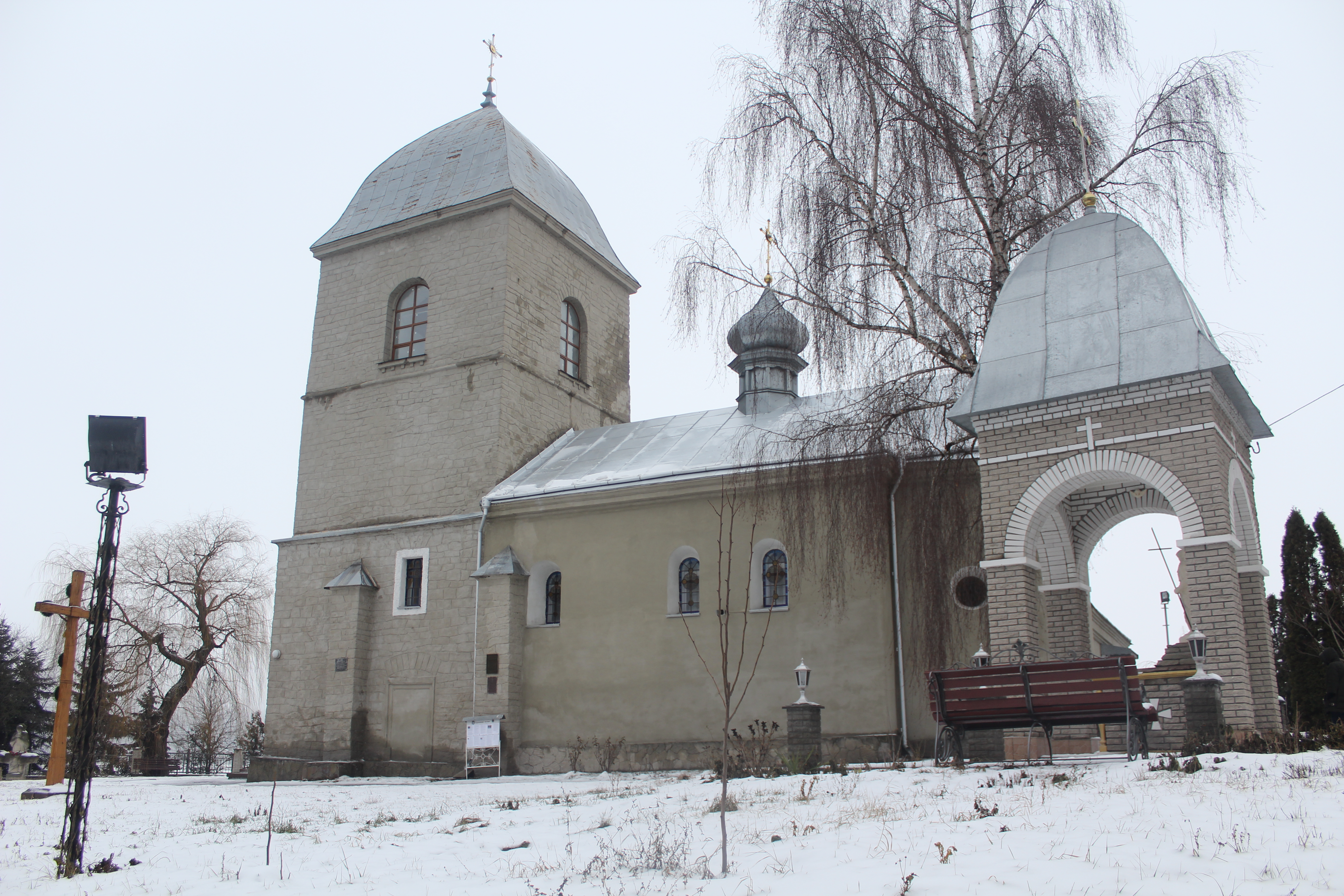
City's first church of Exaltation of Cross

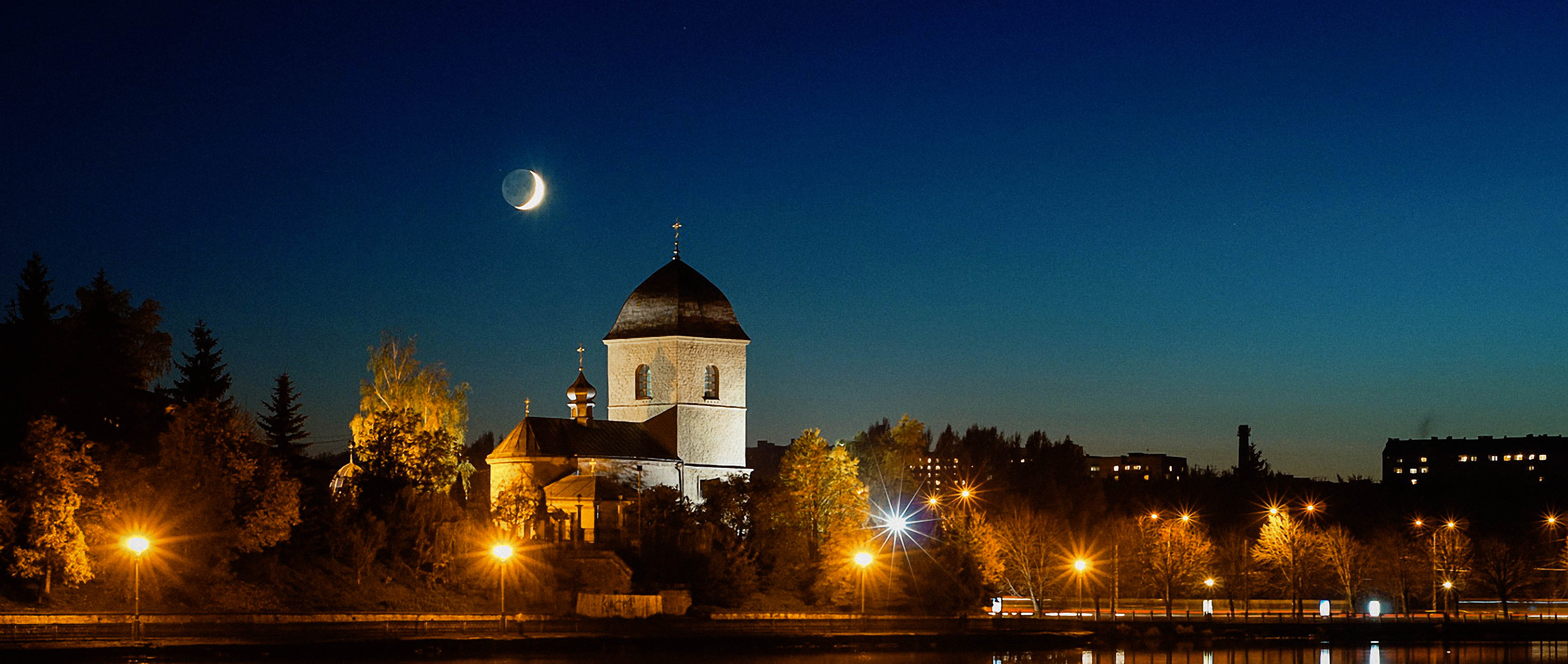
Church at night

Church of the Holy Cross (Vozdvyzhenska, Zdvyzhenska, Nadstavna) is the oldest church in Ternopil in western Ukraine. It is an architectural monument of national significance which was built at the end of the 16th century. It is located on a hill overlooking Ternopil Pond and was built by Polish Crown Hetman Jan Tarnovsky on the site of an ancient wooden cathedral which dated back to Kyivan Rus' times.
