= Terebovlia =

City in Ternopil Oblast, Ukraine

Terebovlia Теребовля
- City
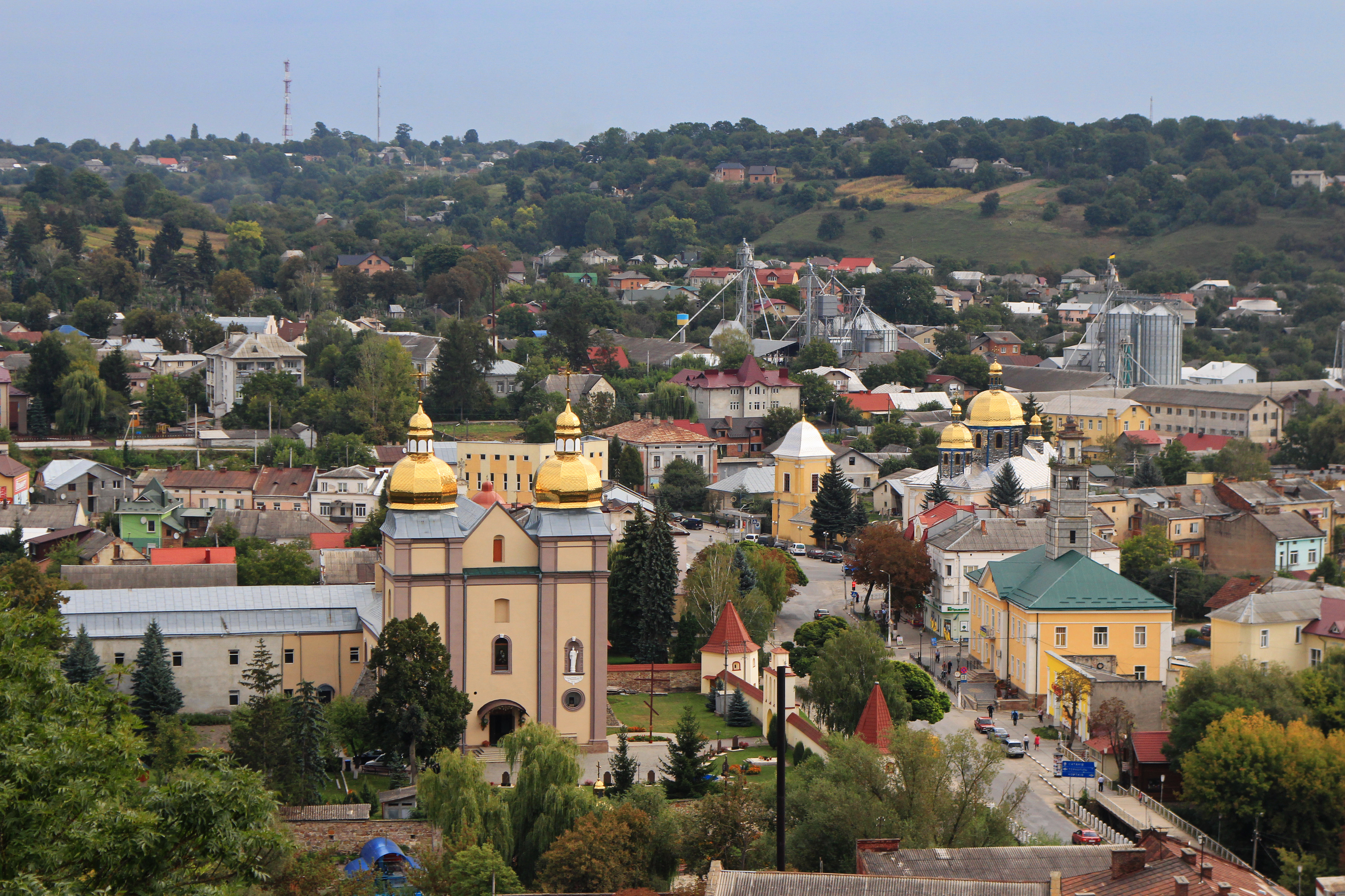
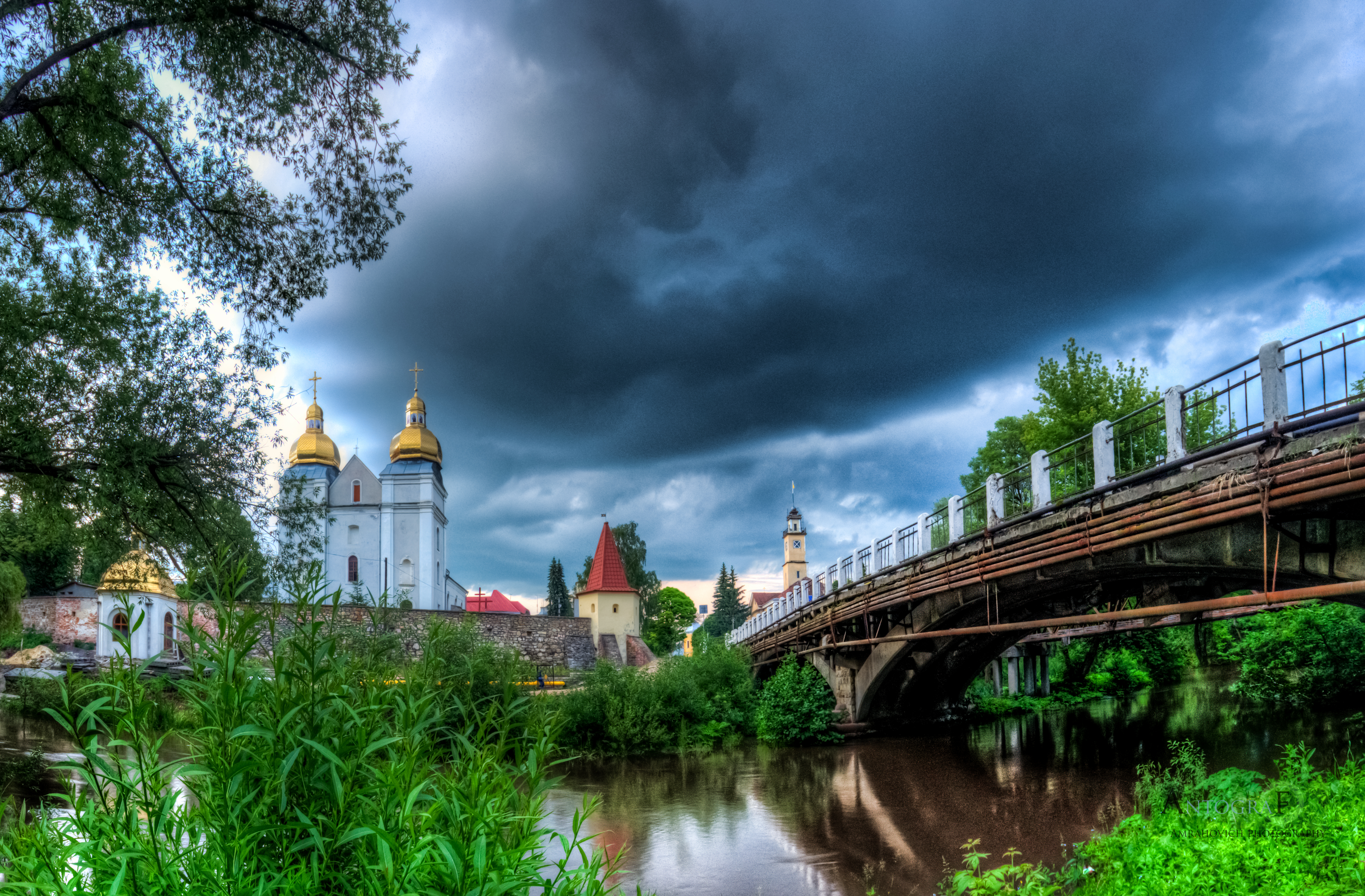
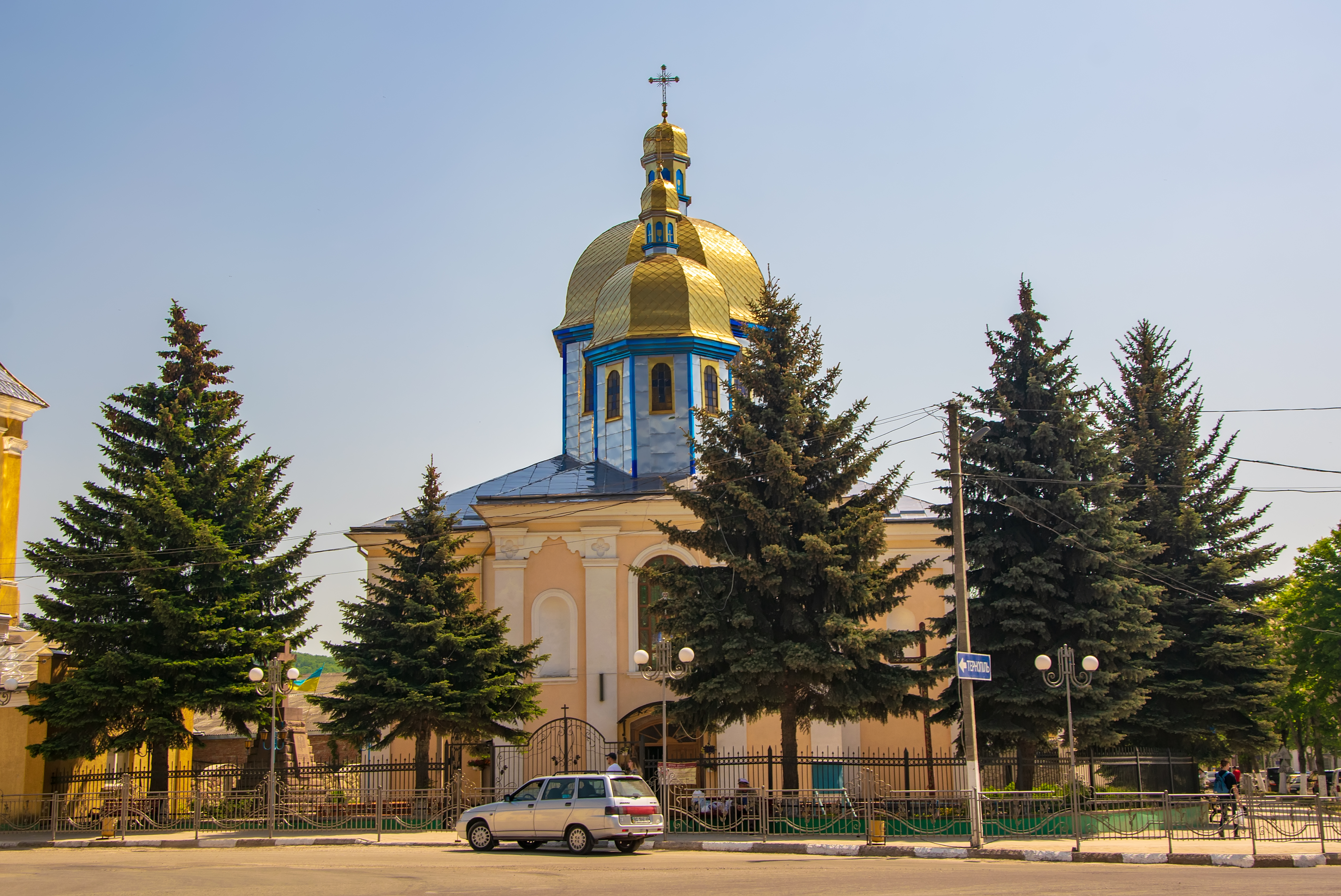
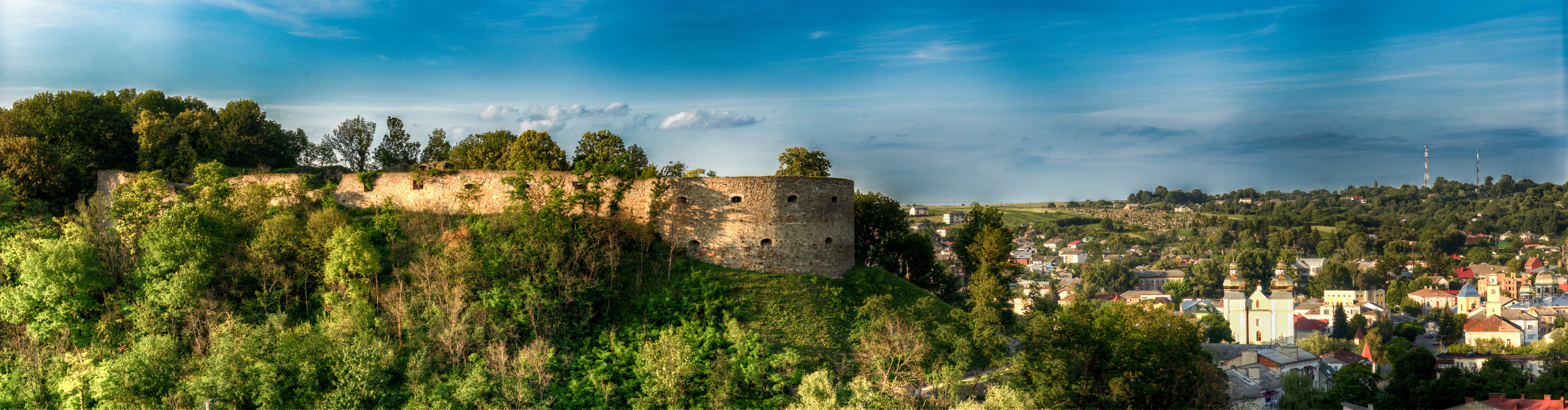
- Clockwise from top: view of Terebovlia from the castle; Saint Nicholas Church; Terebovlia Castle; Monastery of Carmelites

- Flag Coat of arms
- Interactive map of Terebovlia
- Location within Ternopil Oblast Location within Ukraine
- Coordinates: 49°18′00″N 25°41′25″E
- Country: Ukraine
- Oblast: Ternopil Oblast
- Raion: Ternopil Raion
- Hromada: Terebovlia urban hromada
- First mentioned: 1097
- Magdeburg rights: 1389

Population (2022)
  - Total: 13,226
- Time zone: UTC+2 (EET)
  - Summer (DST): UTC+3 (EEST)

Terebovlia (Note: The name may also be variously transliterated as Terebovlya, Terebovla, or Terebovlja.) (Ukrainian: Теребовля, IPA: [tereˈbɔu̯lʲɐ]; Polish: Trembowla; Yiddish: טרעבעוולע, romanized: Trebevle) is a small city in Ternopil Raion, Ternopil Oblast, western Ukraine. Terebovlia hosts the administration of Terebovlia urban hromada, one of the hromadas of Ukraine. Population: 13,226 (2022 estimate); 13,661 (2001).

== History ==
Terebovlia is one of the oldest cities in West Ukraine. It was first mentioned in the chronicles of 1097 (Primary Chronicle). During the Red Ruthenia times it used to be the center of Terebovlia principality. It was called Terebovl. Terebovlia principality included lands of the whole southeast of Galicia, Podolia, and Bukovina. Polish King Casimir III the Great became the suzerain of Halych after the death of his cousin, Boleslaw-Yuri II of Galicia, when the city became part of the Polish domain. It was fully incorporated into Poland in 1430 during the reign of king Władysław II Jagiełło, while his son Casimir IV Jagiellon granted the town limited Magdeburg Rights.

After the rebuilding of the castle in Terebovlia in 1366, Poland (Podole Voivodeship) administered the town. It was part of the system of border fortifications of the Polish Kingdom and later the Polish–Lithuanian Commonwealth against Moldavian and Wallachian incursions. The town also later resisted frequent invasion by the Crimean Tatars, the Ottomans and the Zaporozhian Cossacks from the south and southeast. Because of the threat of invasion, the Terebovlya castle, monastery and churches were all designed as defensive structures. The town was the seat of the famous starost and the most successful 16th-century anti-Tatar Polish commander Bernard Pretwicz, who died there in 1563. In 1594, the Ukrainian cossack rebel Severyn Nalyvaiko sacked the town.

=== Khmelnytsky Uprising ===
During the Khmelnytsky Uprising, Terebovl became one of the centers of the struggle in Podolia. The city was frequently raided by Crimean Tatars, Turks and their erstwhile allies, the Zaporozhian Cossacks. The most destructive attacks happened in 1498, 1508, 1515 and 1516, resulting in a temporary decline of the town. In 1674, as preparations were undertaken for another war with the Turks who were then at war with Muscovy, the Diet decided to further strengthen Terebovlia and send garrisons there. The following year, the Janissary once again embarked on raids against towns and villages, and on 20 September 1675 destroyed the town, but the castle was held by a small group of defenders (80 soldiers and 200 townsmen) until King John III Sobieski arrived to relieve them. This episode is known, as the Battle of Trembowla. The castle was destroyed during the final Turkish invasion of 1688.

Archival views of Trembowla

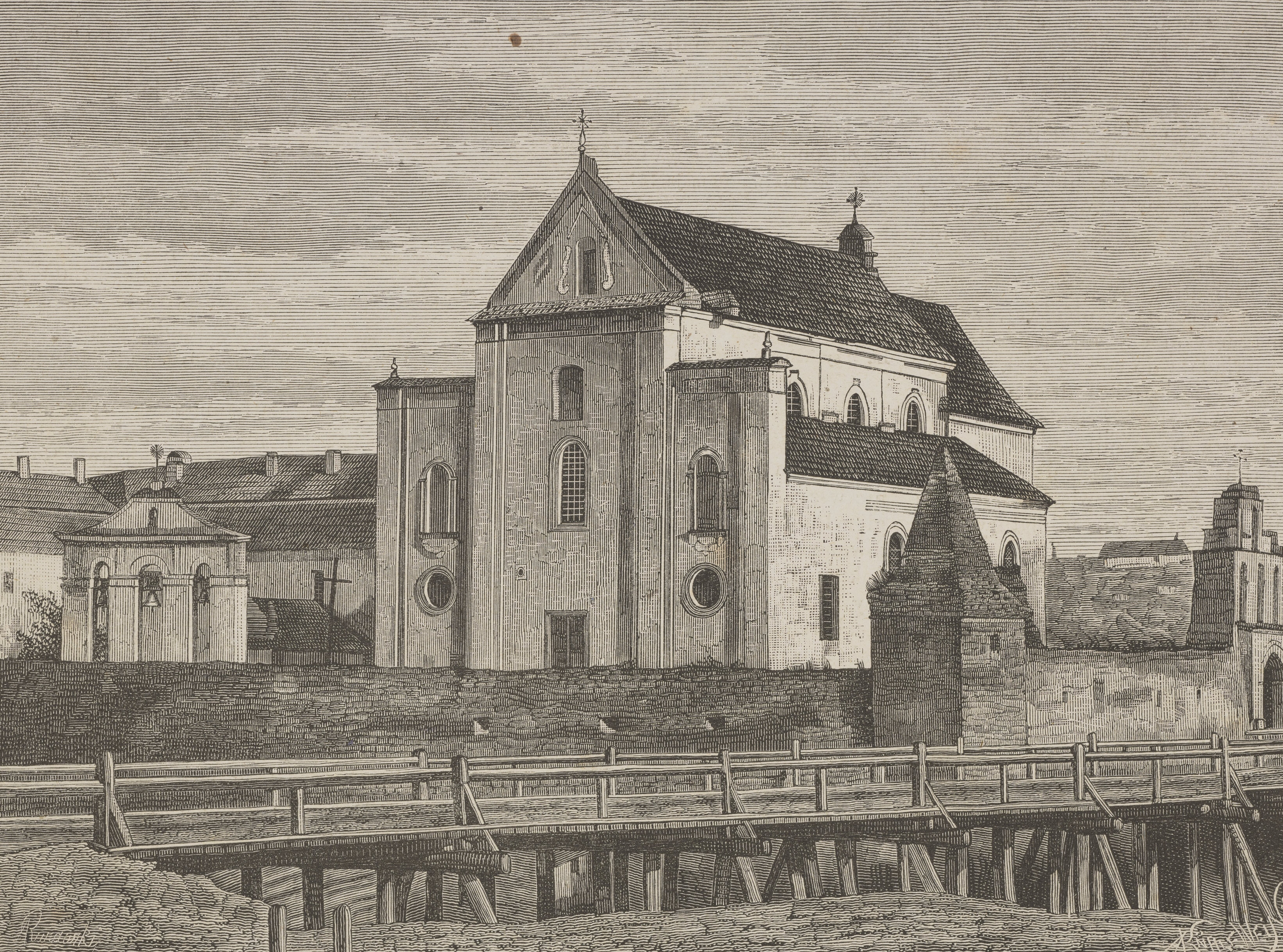
Carmelite church before 1873

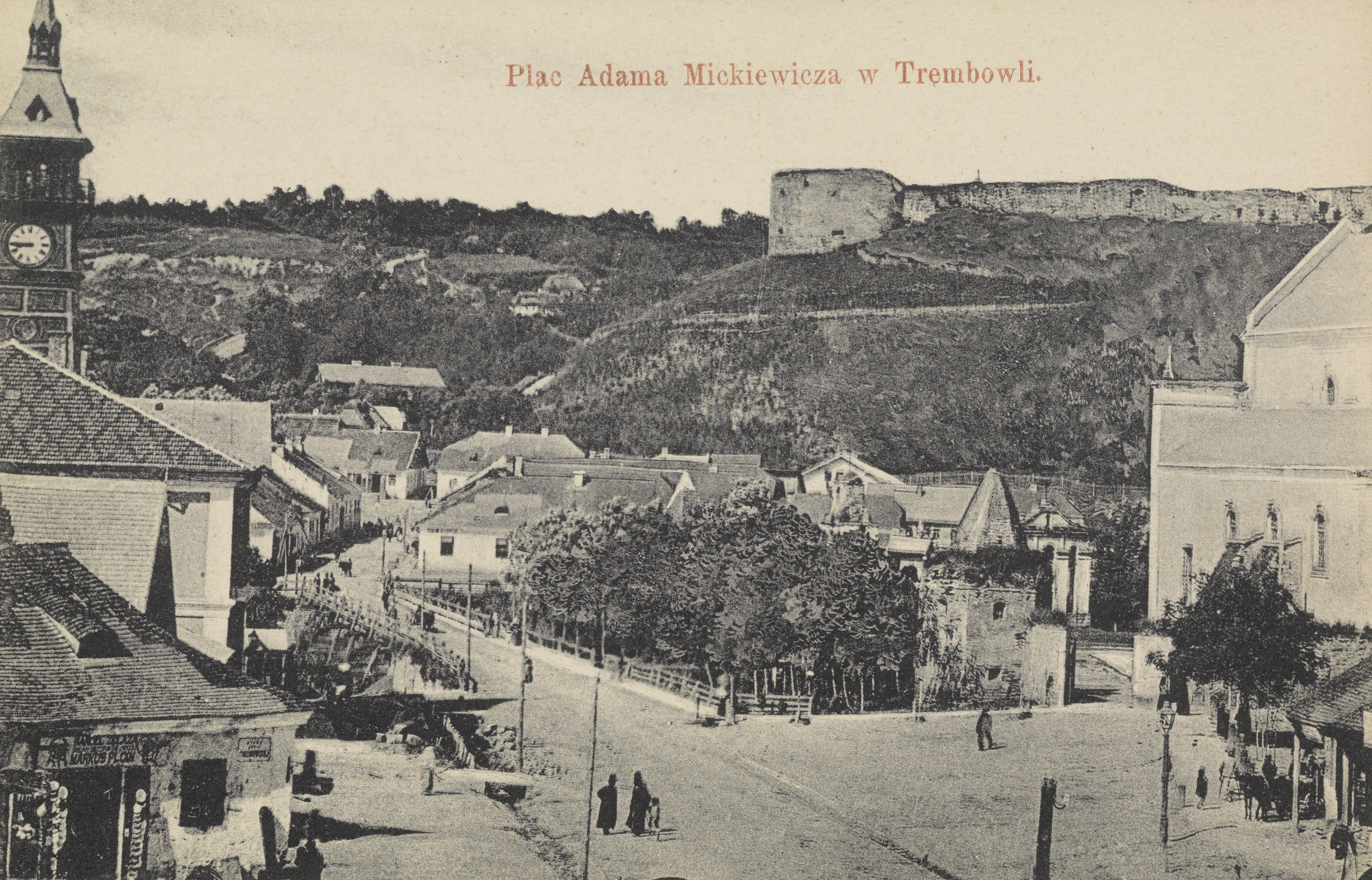
View of the square and castle, before 1906

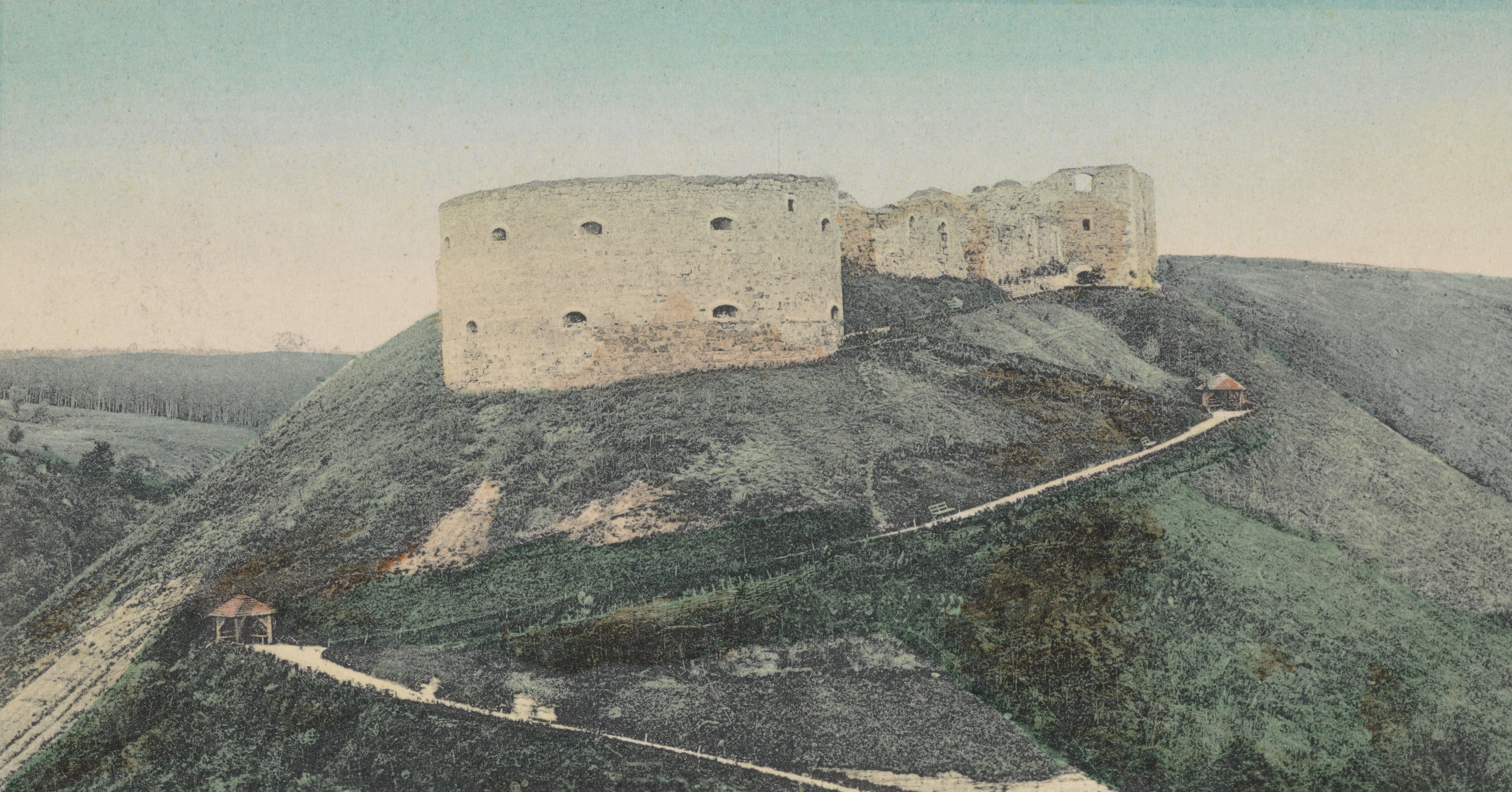
Castle ruins, before 1914

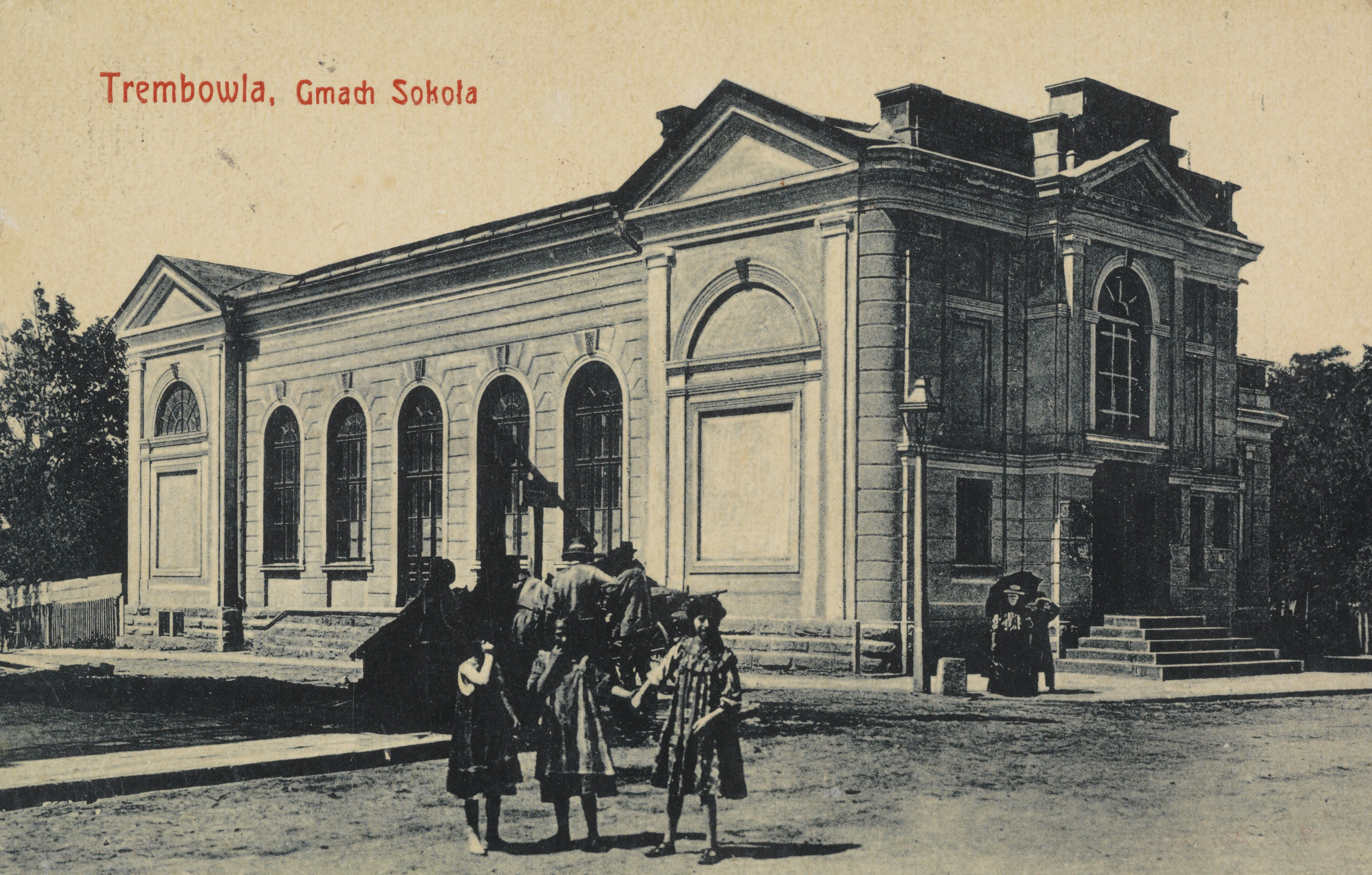
The "Sokół" building, circa 1910

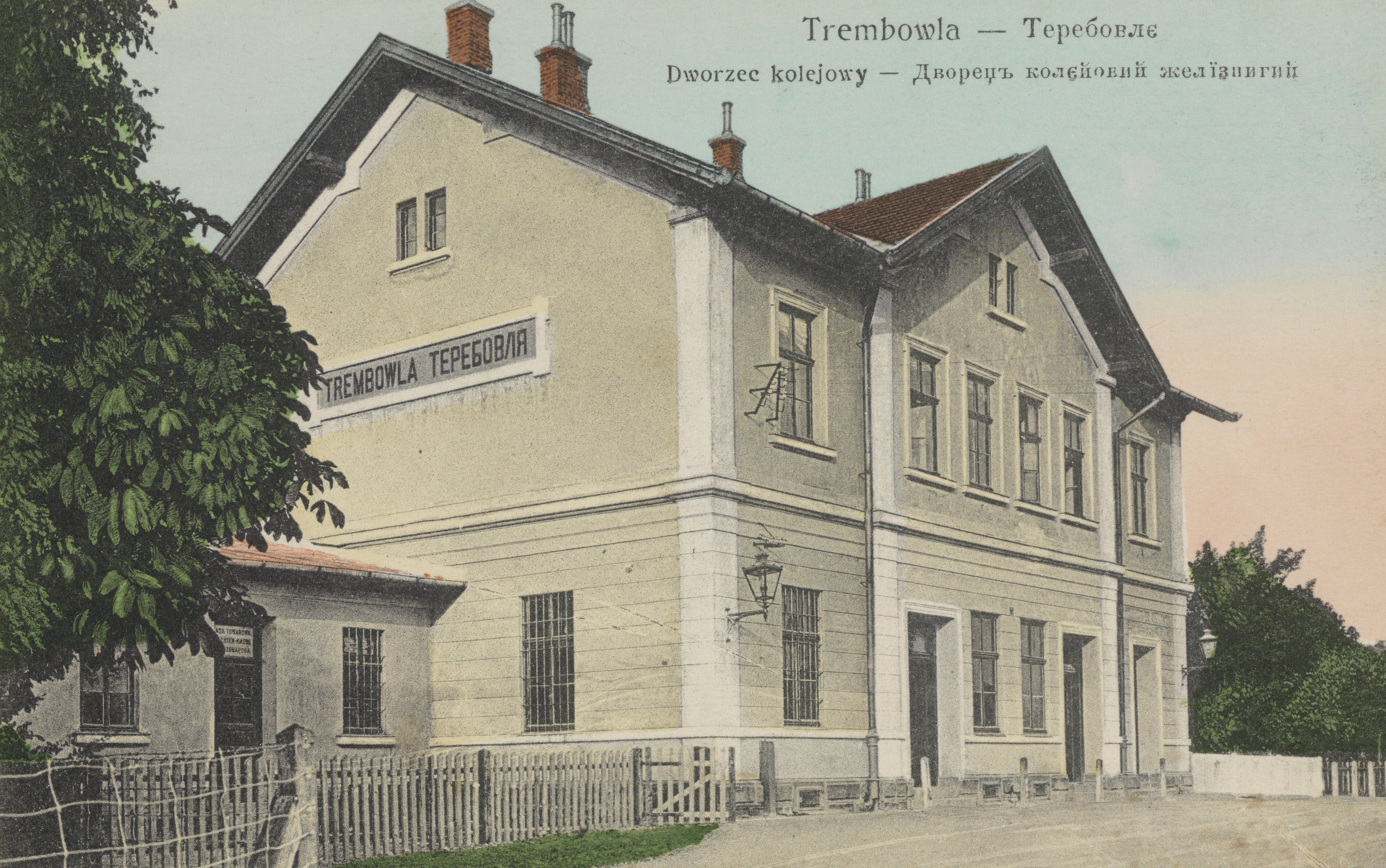
Railway station, 1930-1939

=== Modern history ===
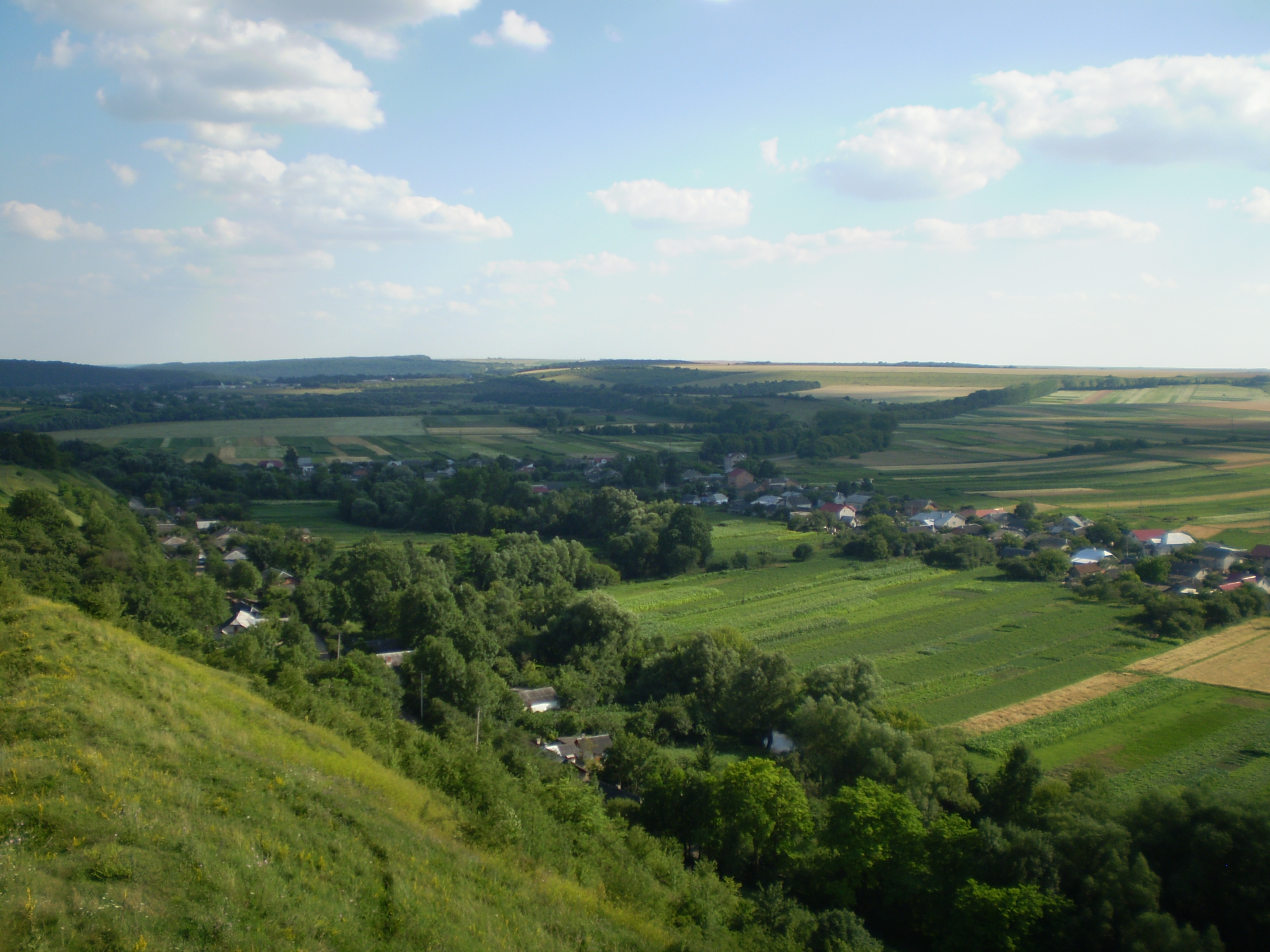
Landscape around Terebovlia

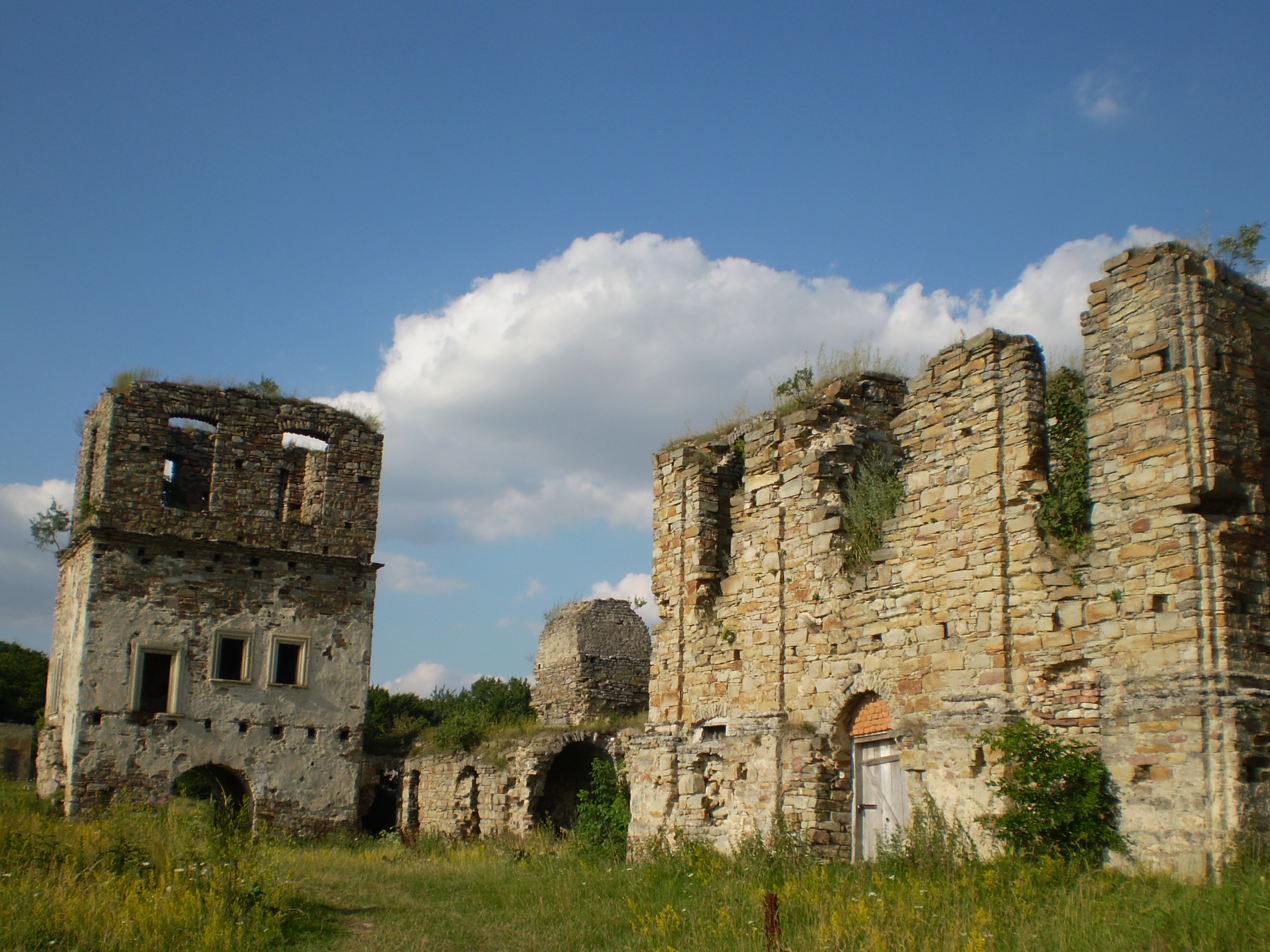
Ruins of Pidhora Monastery

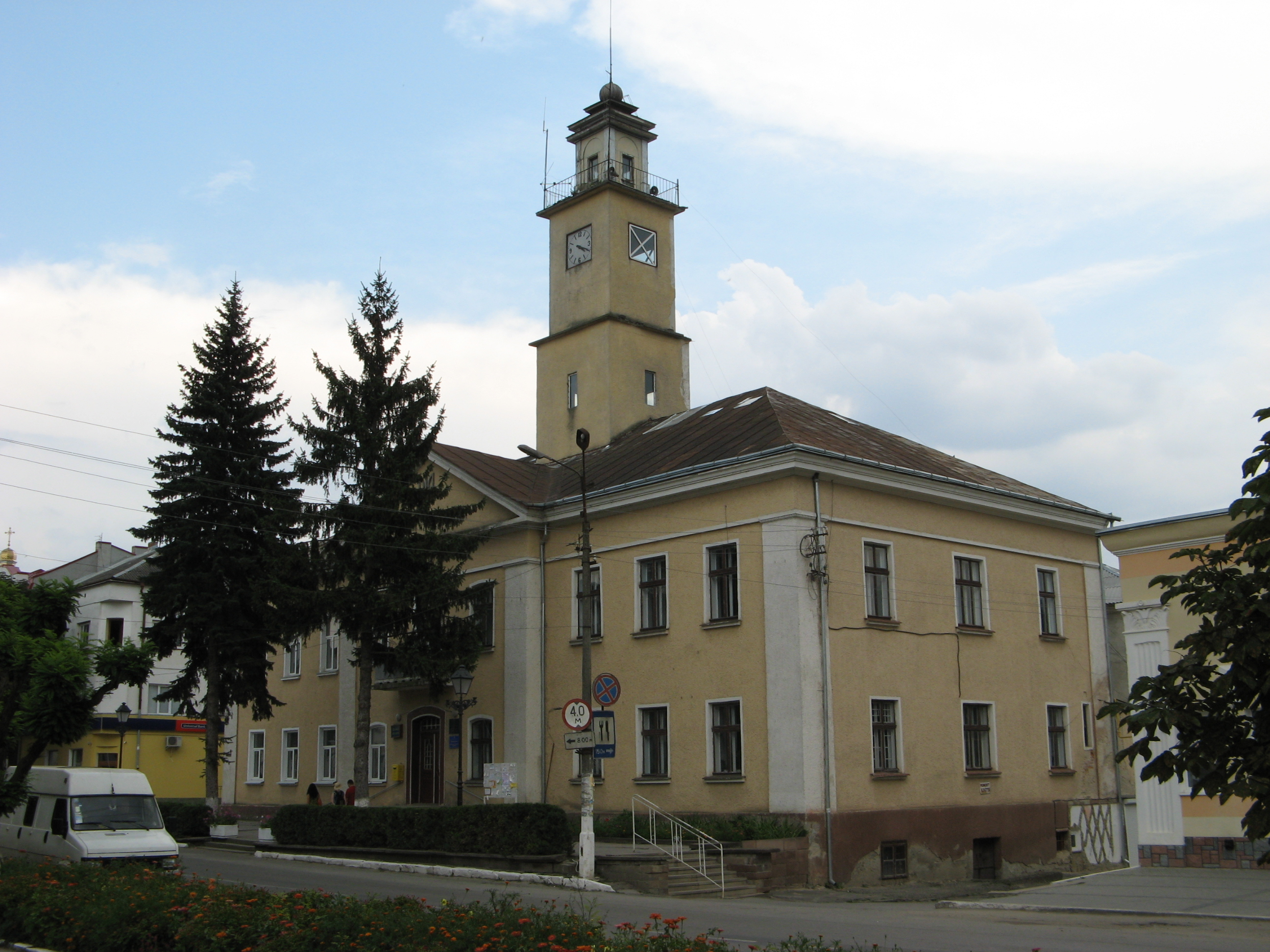
Terebovlia City Hall

After the first partition of Poland in 1772, Trembowla became part of the Habsburg Empire's Galicia until 1918. From November 18, 1918, until June 9, 1919, the town was under control of the West Ukrainian People's Republic. Following the Polish–Ukrainian War, Trembowla reverted to Polish rule, and served as seat of a county in Tarnopol Voivodeship. In the interbellum period, the town was home to the 9th Regiment of Lesser Poland Uhlans.

The Soviet Union took the city along with interwar eastern Poland in September 1939. The Soviets remained in power until the German invasion which began on 22 June 1941. Terebovlia was under German occupation from 5 July 1941 until 22 March 1944. It was administered as a part of the District of Galicia of the General Government of Nazi Germany. After troops of the 1st Ukrainian Front of the Red Army retook the town, it again became part of Soviet Ukraine between 1944–1991. In the first month of the German occupation, Ukrainian police arrested, tortured, and shot forty Jews. In 1942 and 1943, Germans, assisted by Ukrainian police, rounded up thousands of Jews. They murdered thousands nearby, in mass executions. After the liberation, only fifty or sixty people from the entire Jewish community had survived.

During World War II, Trembowla and the surrounding areas also witnessed mass murders of ethnic Poles. After investigation of crimes done by Ukrainian nationalists and local Ukrainian peasantry, the Institute of National Remembrance of Poland confirmed 1,002 deaths in the territory of Tarnopol and Trembowla powiats (counties) As a result, and following the population exchange between Poland and Soviet Ukraine, almost all Polish survivors left the town in 1945, moving to the Recovered Territories of Poland. In 1991, Terebovlia became part of an independent Ukraine.

Until 18 July 2020, Terebovlia was the administrative center of Terebovlia Raion. The raion was abolished in July 2020 as part of the administrative reform of Ukraine, which reduced the number of raions of Ternopil Oblast to three. The area of Terebovlia Raion was merged into Ternopil Raion.

== Demographics ==
Terebovlia is an ancient settlement that traces its roots to the settlement of Terebovl which existed in Kievan Rus'. In 1913 the city counted 10,000 residents, of whom 4,000 were Poles, 3,200 were Ruthenians and 2,800 were Jews. In 1929 there were 7,015 people, mostly Polish, Ukrainian and Jewish. Prior to World War II, Trembowla was a county seat within the Tarnopol Voivodeship of the Second Polish Republic. Prior to the Holocaust, the city was home to 1,486 Jews, and most of them (around 1,100) were shot by Germans in the nearby village of Plebanivka on April 7, 1943.

=== Ethnic Composition ===
The distribution of the population by ethnicity according to the data from the 2001 Ukrainian Census

Ethnicity	Percentage
Ukrainians	97.92%
Russians	1.46%
Poles	0.30%
Belarusians	0.10%
Others/Not specified	0.22%

=== Language ===
The distribution of the population by native language according to the data from the 2001 Ukrainian Census:

Language	Number	Percentage
Ukrainian	13262	98.57%
Russian	170	1.26%
Romanian	6	0.04%
Polish	4	0.03%
Belarusian	3	0.02%
Armenian	2	0.02%
Hungarian	1	0.01%
Others/Not specified	7	0.05%
Total	13455	100%

== Sites of interest ==
The town has ruins of a castle which was built by King Casimir the Great in the second half of the 14th century. In 1534, the castle was expanded by the Voivode of Kraków, Andrzej Teczynski, and in 1631 it was again expanded by the Castellan of Trembowla, Andrzej Balaban. In 1648, it was captured by the Cossacks.

Other sites of interest are a Carmelite church and monastery complex, founded in 1617 by Piotr Ozga. It formerly housed the painting of Our Lady of Trembowla, which was moved to St. Catherine Church in Gdańsk after World War II. Communist authorities turned the complex into a factory, and later a house of culture. Currently, it is an Orthodox church. Three kilometers south of the town, there are ruins of a 17th-century defensive monastery of the Basilian monks. It was completed in 1716. Terebovlia also has a Roman Catholic church of Saint Peter and Paul, designed in 1927 by architect Adolf Szyszko-Bohusz.

== International relations ==
Terebovlia is twinned with:

- Lubomierz, Poland (since 2015)
- Starogard, Poland (since 2018)
- Kowary, Poland (since 2019)
- Pont-du-Château, France

== Notable residents ==
- Mariia Tymchuk (born 1989), Ukrainian master of decorative and applied arts
