= Borys Demkiv =

Ukrainian poet, translator (1936–2001)

- Борис Миколайович Демків
- Born: 20 July 1936; Ternopil
- Died: 31 December 2001 (aged 65); Ternopil
- Education: University of Lviv
- Occupations: Poet, translator

Borys Demkiv (Ukrainian: Борис Миколайович Демків; 20 July 1936, Ternopil – 31 December 2001, ibid.) was a Ukrainian poet, translator. Member of the National Writers' Union of Ukraine (1967).

== Biography ==
Having graduated from University of Lviv in 1973, he began his career in journalism. From 1969 to 1979, he worked as a correspondent for regional newspapers. His active involvement was closely linked to the region's cultural and artistic life: starting in 1984, he headed the regional creative youth club "Soniachni Klarnety", and later, from 1990 to 1997, he managed the Department of Literature and Arts at the newspaper "Rusalka Dnistrova" and the magazine "Ternopil".

== Creativity ==
His literary debut took place in 1960. The author's work focuses on a profound understanding of the history of Ukraine and its modernity, with particular attention to the era of the national revival.

He is the author of a number of lyrical songs, the music for which was composed by well-known figures such as O. Bilash, O. Herman, A. Horchynskyi, B. Klymchuk, M. Obleshchuk, V. Podufalyi, V. Soroka, and others.

A significant part of his literary activity is translation. He worked with works from Bulgarian (N. Vats-parov, I. Davydkov, S. Danchev, E. Zhechkov), Polish (J. Słowacki, A. Mickiewicz, J. Daniel, S. Jabłońska), as well as Belarusian, Georgian, Estonian, and other literatures. Some of his own poems have also been translated into Bulgarian and Polish.

He published the following poetry collections:

- Suvora Nizhnist (1965);
- Symvoly (1968);
- Chervone Movchannia (1973);
- Krylo Zori (1978);
- Drevo Zhyttia (1982);
- Poezii (1986);
- Oratoriia Lisu (1987);
- Kvitу Romena: Vybrani Lirychni Pisni (1995);
- Zalyshaiu Dlia Vas (2004).

== Awards ==
- Stepan Budnyi Prize (1972),
- Brothers Lepky Prize (1996).

== Bibliography ==
- Герман О. Вітер в горах заснув // Нова Тернопільська газета. — 2002. — 6 лют.
- Сорока П. Секрет вічності, або Ліра і терни: Десять етюдів про Б. Демкова. — Т., 2003.
