= Carmelite Monastery, Terebovlia =

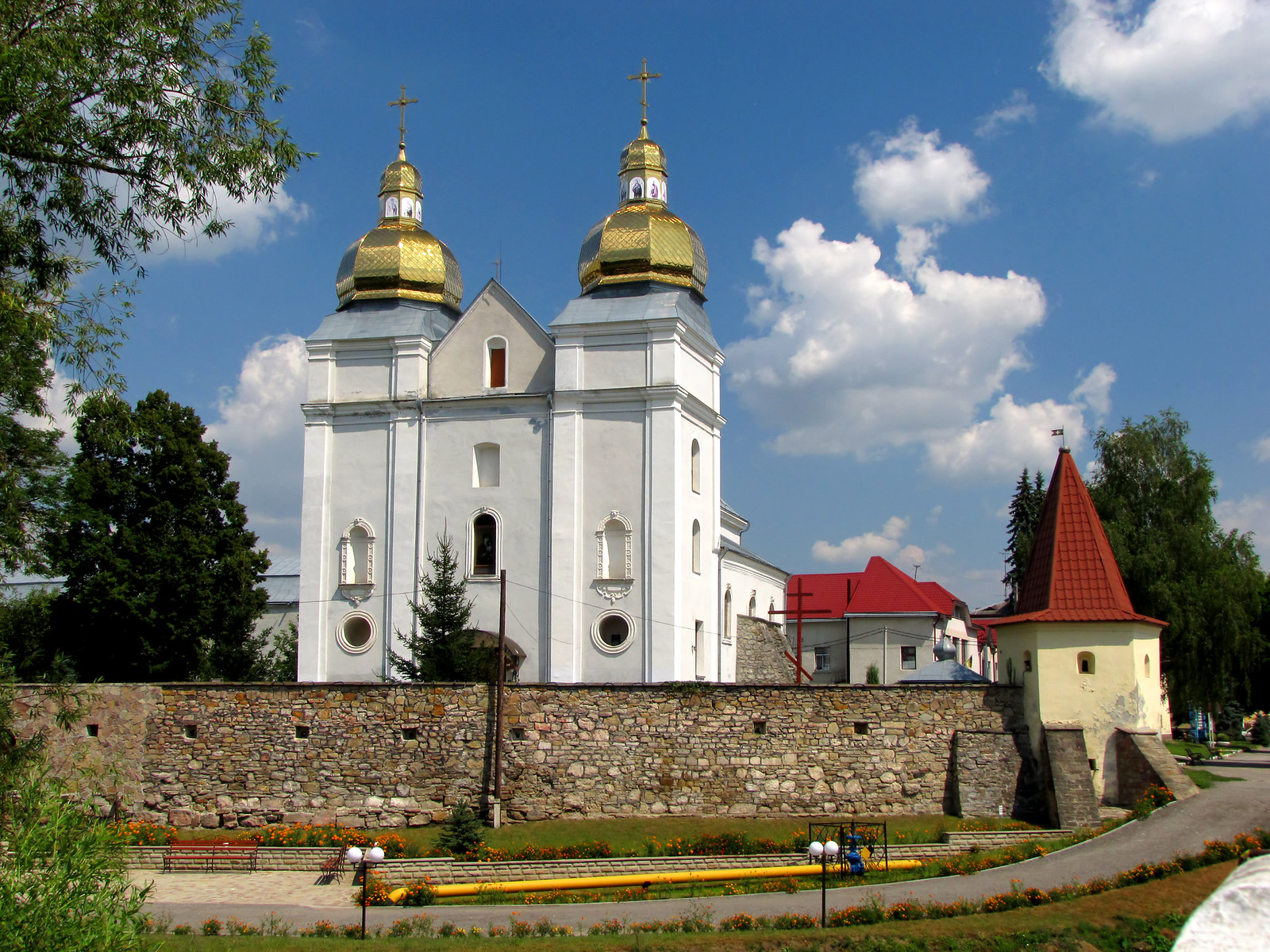
Carmelite Monastery

The Carmelite monastery complex (Ukrainian: Монастир кармелітів) in Terebovlia, Ternopil Oblast was founded by Piotr Ożga in 1617, and its current buildings were erected in 1635–1639. The complex was defensive in nature and surrounded by a 17th-century brick wall with pentagonal towers and loopholes. The two-story monastery building is adjacent to the presbytery of the church. It is an architectural monument of national significance.

The Church of the Assumption (now St. Volodymyr Church) is a three-nave basilica with two towers on the facade and modest decoration. Inside, fragments of 18th-century illusionistic polychromy (by Józef Mayer) have been preserved. On the pylons, there were commemorative plaques in honor of the defense of Terebovlia (1675) and the Battle of Vienna (1683).

After the monastery was abolished, the church became a parish church. In 1945, the particularly revered Theotokos of Terebovlia was taken by the Carmelites to Poland (now in Gdańsk). During the Soviet period, the complex was used as a warehouse and factory for Christmas tree decorations, and in 1987, the shrine burned down. After 1990, the complex was transferred to the Ukrainian Autocephalous Orthodox Church. The buildings were repaired, the towers were restored, and the monastery now houses the Spiritual Seminary of the UAOC.
