= Hnizna =

River in Ternopil Oblast, Ukraine

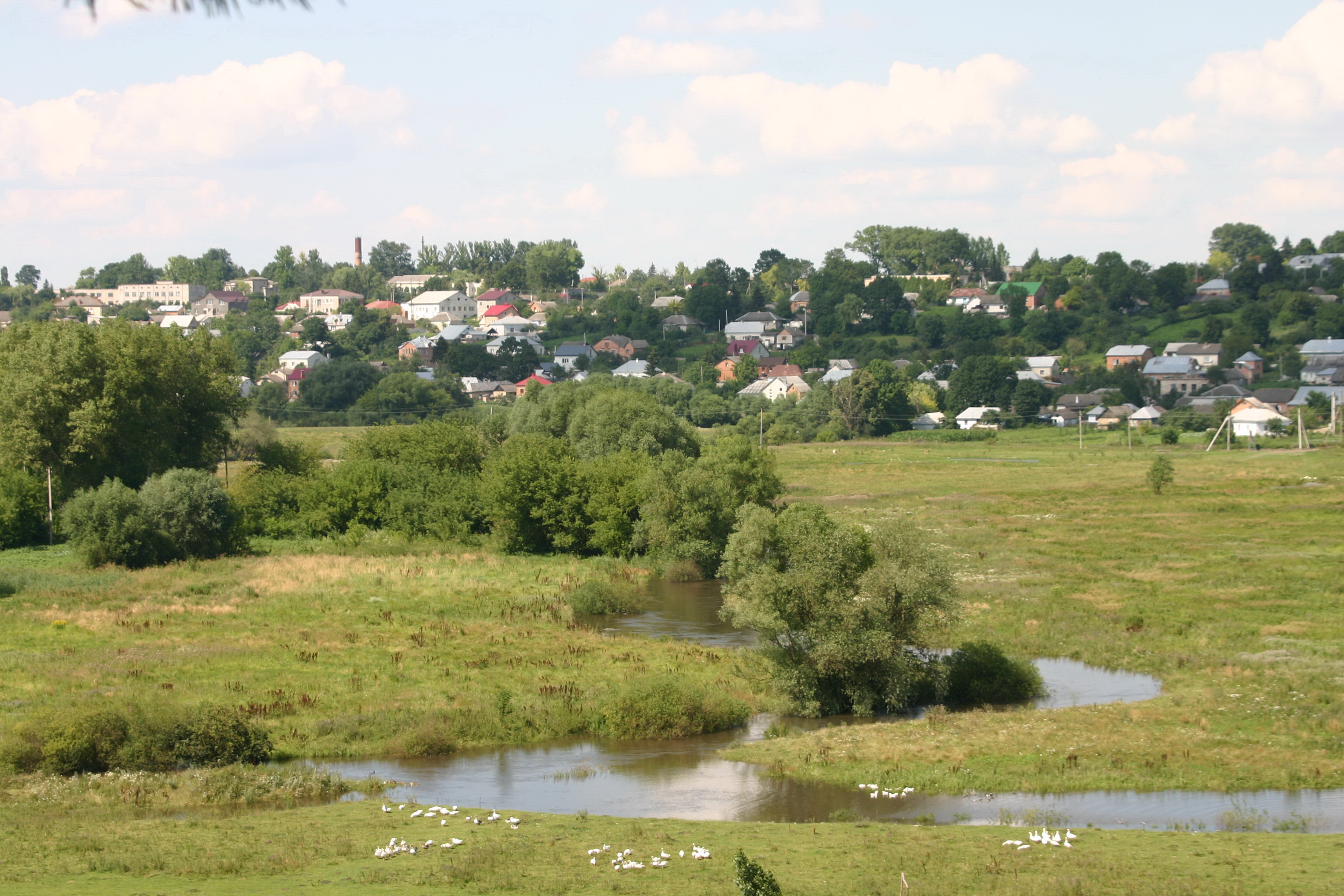
- Hnizna River near Velyki Birky
- Native name: Гнізна (Ukrainian)

Location
- Country: Ukraine

Physical characteristics
- Source
  - location: to the northwest of Shymkivtsi
  - elevation: 49°16′04″N 25°41′38″E
- Mouth: Seret
  - coordinates: 49°46′12″N 25°45′57″E
- Length: 81 km (50 mi)

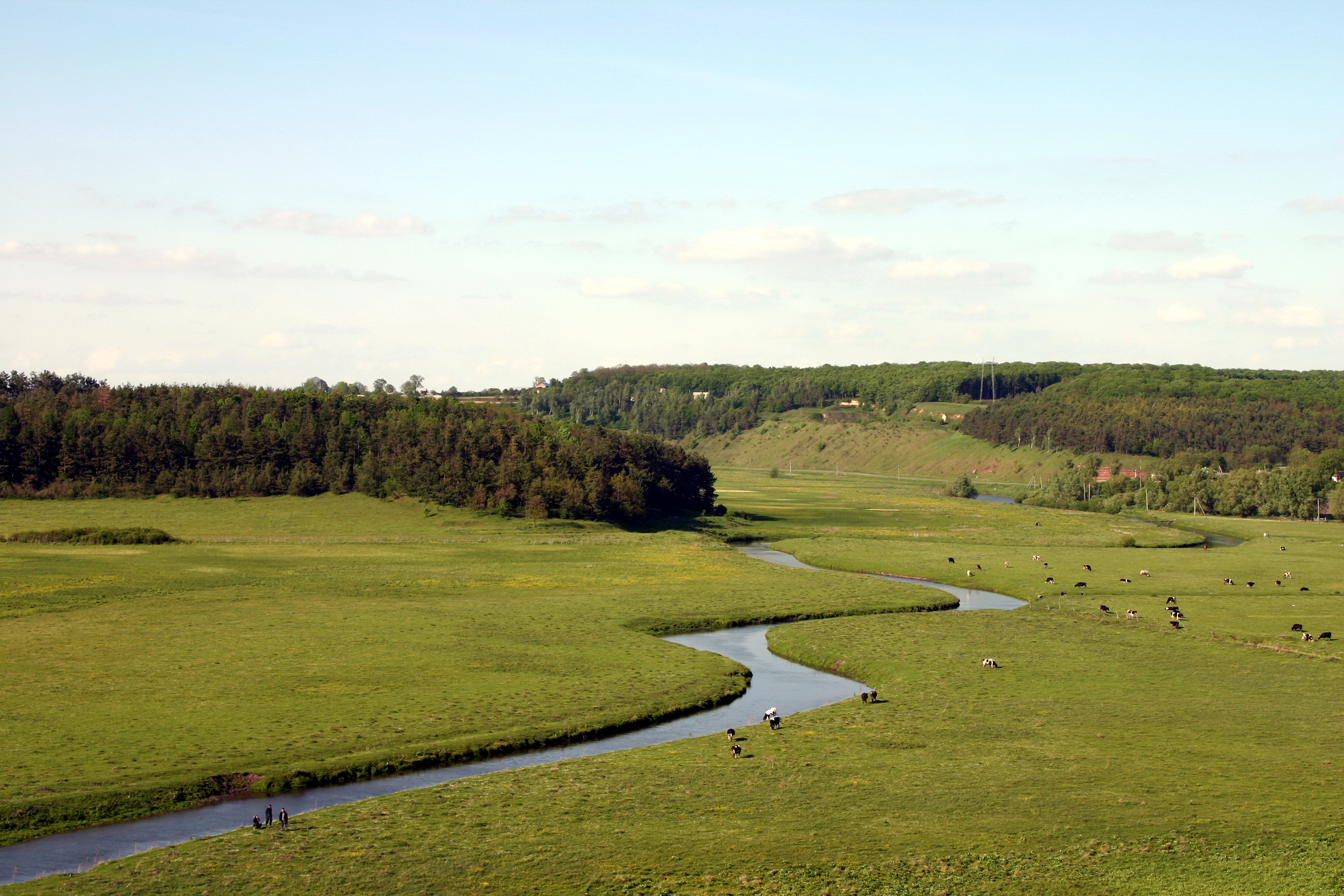
The view from Bavoriv to Hnizna.

Hnizna (Ukrainian: Гнізна) is a river in Ukraine which flows within the Ternopil Raion of Ternopil Oblast.

== Details ==
It is the left tributary of the river Seret from the Dniester basin. The main tributary is the Hnizdechna (right).

It is 81 kilometres (50 miles) long and covers an area of 1,110 square kilometres (429 square miles). Leakage to the northwest of Shymkivtsi of the Ternopil Raion. In 1954, a hydrological post was established near Plebanivka in the Ternopil Raion.

On the river banks are the cities of Zbarazh and Terebovlia, the town of Velyki Birky, and the villages of Krasnosiltsi, Malyi Hlybochok, Zaluzhzhia, Chernykhivtsi, Stupky, Tovstoluh, Smolianka, and Skomorokhy in the Ternopil Raion.
