= Chumali =

Rural locality in Ternopil Oblast, Ukraine

Chumali Чумалі
- Location in Ternopil Oblast Chumali (Ternopil Oblast)
- Coordinates: 49°42′29″N 25°39′11″E
- Country: Ukraine
- Oblast: Ternopil Oblast
- Raion: Ternopil Raion
- Hromada: Zbarazh urban hromada
- Time zone: UTC+2 (EET)
  - Summer (DST): UTC+3 (EEST)
- Postal code: 47341

Chumali (Ukrainian: Чумалі) is a village in the Zbarazh urban hromada of the Ternopil Raion of Ternopil Oblast in Ukraine.

== History ==
The first written mention of the village was in 1463.

After the liquidation of the Zbarazh Raion on 19 July 2020, the village became part of the Ternopil Raion.

== Religion ==
- Church of the Presentation of the Blessed Virgin Mary (1910, brick with a miraculous icon of the Blessed Virgin Mary).

== Sources ==
- (in Ukrainian) Мельничук Б., Чумалі // Ternopil Encyclopedic Dictionary: in 4 v. / editorial board: H. Yavorskyi and other, Ternopil: "Zbruch", 2008, V. 3: П—Я, S. 617. — ISBN 978-966-528-279-2.
- "Czumale". Geographical Dictionary of the Kingdom of Poland (in Polish). 1. Warszawa: Kasa im. Józefa Mianowskiego. 1880. p. 881.
