= Boliazuby =

Rural locality in Ternopil Oblast, Ukraine

Boliazuby Болязуби
- Location in Ternopil Oblast
- Coordinates: 49°45′47″N 25°40′10″E
- Country: Ukraine
- Oblast: Ternopil Oblast
- Raion: Ternopil Raion
- Hromada: Zbarazh urban hromada
- Time zone: UTC+2 (EET)
  - Summer (DST): UTC+3 (EEST)
- Postal code: 47381

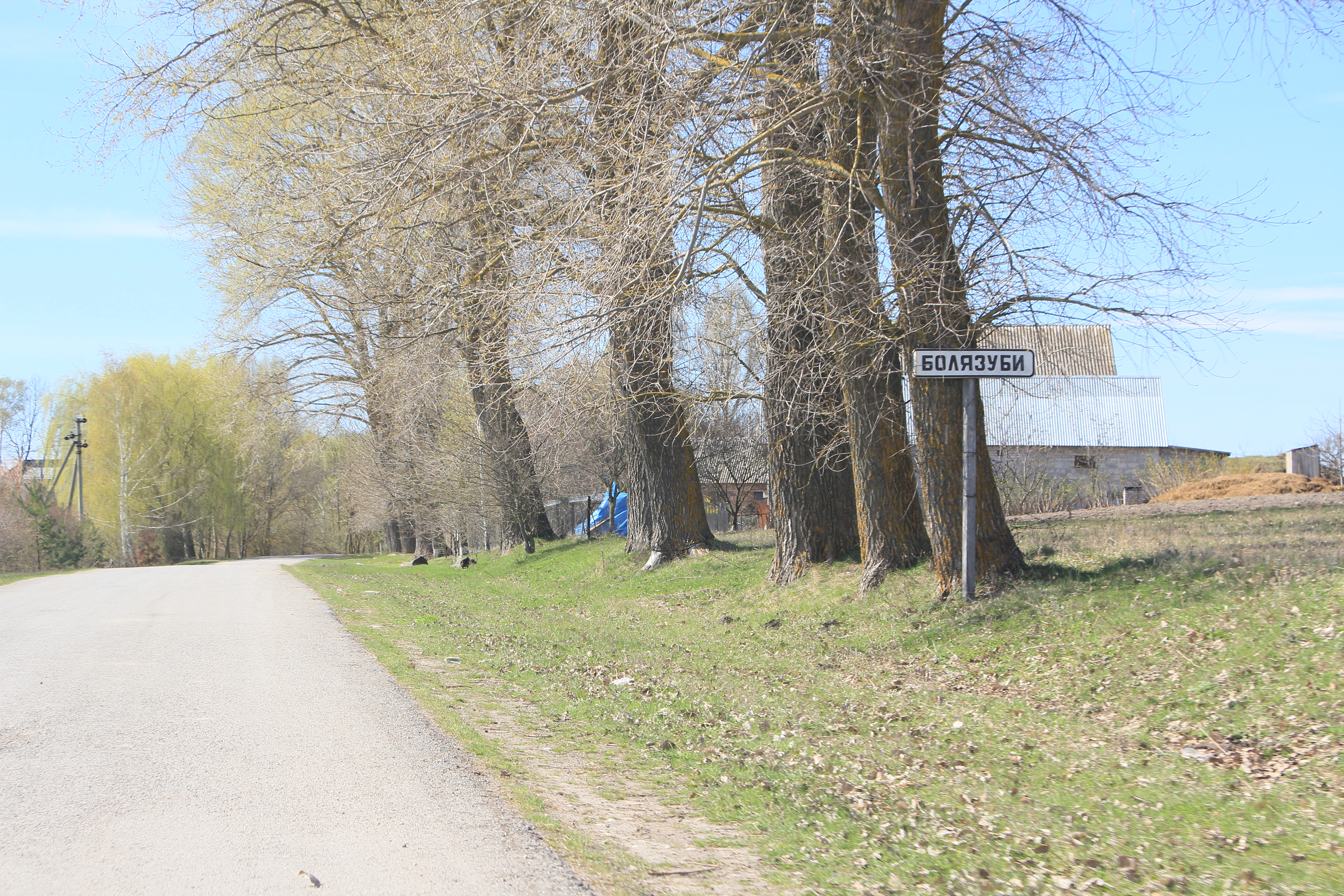
Entrance sign to Bolyazubi

Boliazuby (Ukrainian: Болязуби) is a village in the Zbarazh urban hromada of the Ternopil Raion of Ternopil Oblast in Ukraine.

== History ==
The first written mention of the village was in 1583.

After the liquidation of the Zbarazh Raion on 19 July 2020, the village became part of the Ternopil Raion.

== Religion ==
- Holy Trinity church (1907, wooden),
- House of Prayer of Evangelicals (1991).

== Sources ==
- (in Ukrainian) Уніят В., Хаварівський Б., Болязуби // Ternopil Encyclopedic Dictionary: in 4 v. / editorial board: H. Yavorskyi and other, Ternopil: "Zbruch", 2004, V. 1: А—Й, S. 166. — ISBN 966-528-197-6.
- "Bolizuby". Geographical Dictionary of the Kingdom of Poland (in Polish). p. 192.
