= Vytkivtsi =

Rural locality in Ternopil Oblast, Ukraine

Vytkivtsi Витківці
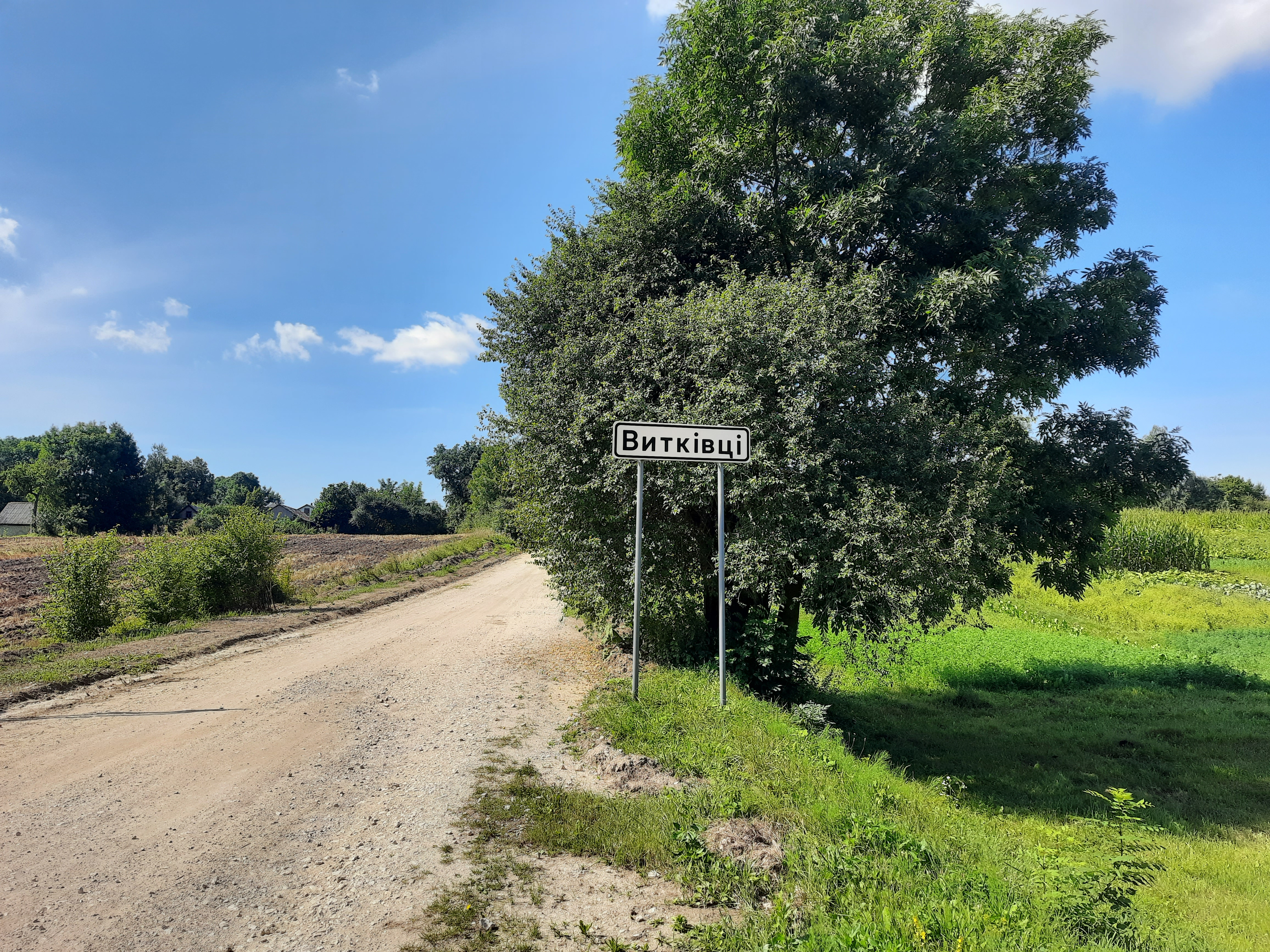
- Village of Vytkivtsi, Ternopil district, Ternopil region.

- Location in Ternopil Oblast
- Coordinates: 49°46′37″N 25°42′14″E
- Country: Ukraine
- Oblast: Ternopil Oblast
- Raion: Ternopil Raion
- Hromada: Zbarazh urban hromada
- Time zone: UTC+2 (EET)
  - Summer (DST): UTC+3 (EEST)
- Postal code: 47333

Vytkivtsi (Ukrainian: Витківці) is a village in the Zbarazh urban hromada of the Ternopil Raion of Ternopil Oblast in Ukraine.

== History ==
The first written mention of the village was in 1654.

After the liquidation of the Zbarazh Raion on 19 July 2020, the village became part of the Ternopil Raion.

== Religion ==
- St. George church (1993, brick).

== Sources ==
- "Witkowce". Geographical Dictionary of the Kingdom of Poland (in Polish). p. 692.
