= Hrytsivtsi =

Rural locality in Ternopil Oblast, Ukraine

Hrytsivtsi Грицівці
- Location in Ternopil Oblast
- Coordinates: 49°37′22″N 25°50′19″E
- Country: Ukraine
- Oblast: Ternopil Oblast
- Raion: Ternopil Raion
- Hromada: Zbarazh urban hromada
- Time zone: UTC+2 (EET)
  - Summer (DST): UTC+3 (EEST)
- Postal code: 47371

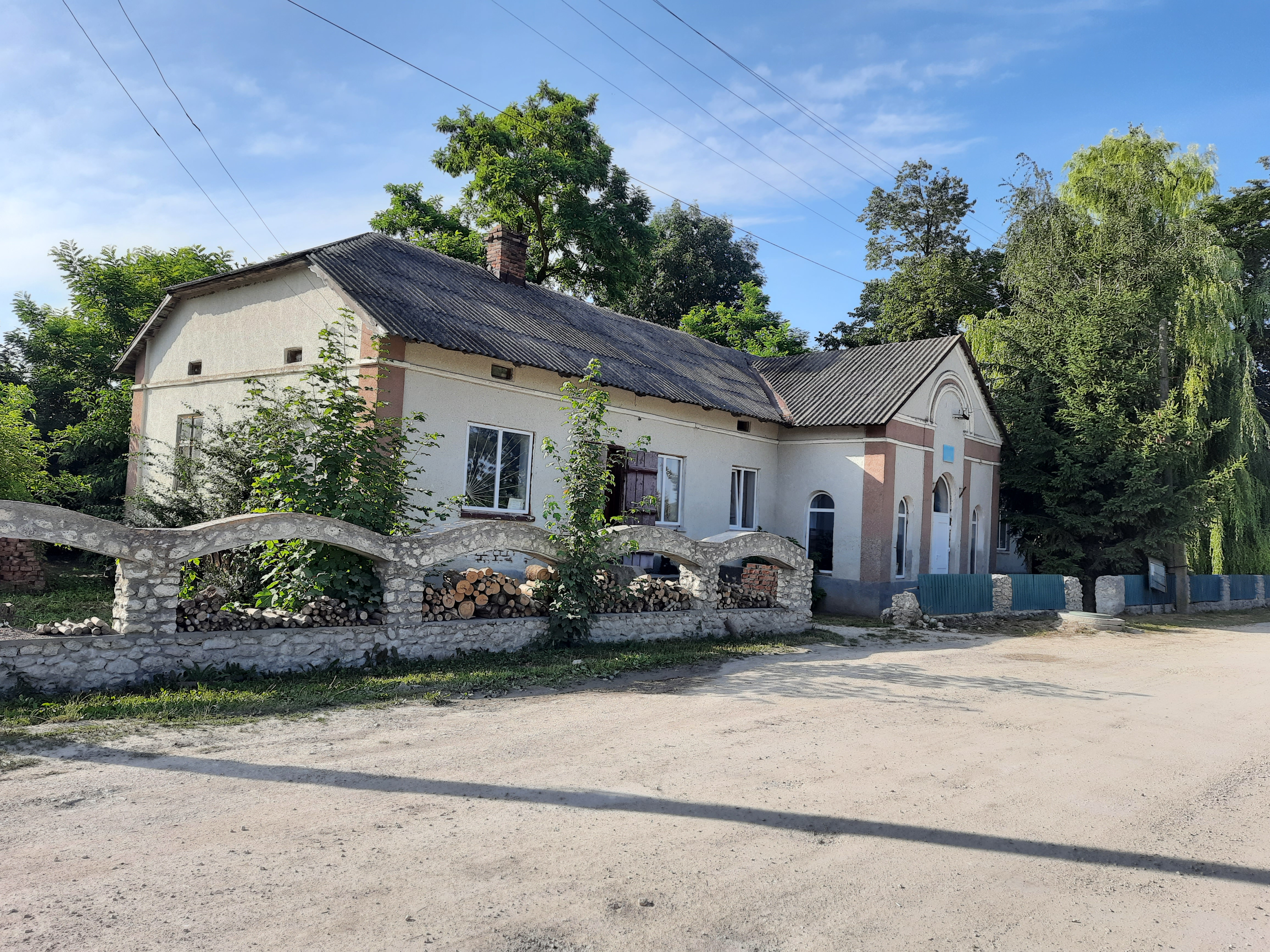
Home in Hrytsivtsi

Hrytsivtsi (Ukrainian: Грицівці) is a village in the Zbarazh urban hromada of the Ternopil Raion of Ternopil Oblast in Ukraine.

== History ==
The first written mention of the village was in 1463.

After the liquidation of the Zbarazh Raion on 19 July 2020, the village became part of the Ternopil Raion.

== Religion ==
- St. Nicholas Chapel on the site of the destroyed Roman Catholic church (1995, brick).

== Sources ==
- "Hrycowce". Geographical Dictionary of the Kingdom of Poland (in Polish). 3. Warszawa: Kasa im. Józefa Mianowskiego. 1882. p. 192.
