= Novyi Rohovets =

Rural locality in Ternopil Oblast, Ukraine

Novyi Rohovets Новий Роговець
- Location in Ternopil Oblast
- Coordinates: 49°39′14″N 25°54′28″E
- Country: Ukraine
- Oblast: Ternopil Oblast
- Raion: Ternopil Raion
- Hromada: Zbarazh urban hromada
- Time zone: UTC+2 (EET)
  - Summer (DST): UTC+3 (EEST)
- Postal code: 47362

Novyi Rohovets (Ukrainian: Новий Роговець) is a village in the Zbarazh urban hromada of the Ternopil Raion of Ternopil Oblast in Ukraine.

== History ==
The first written mention of the village was in 1463.

After the liquidation of the Zbarazh Raion on 19 July 2020, the village became part of the Ternopil Raion.

== Religion ==
- St. Nicholas church (1994).

== Sources ==
- (in Ukrainian) Лашта В., Новий Роговець // Ternopil Encyclopedic Dictionary: in 4 v. / editorial board: H. Yavorskyi and other, Ternopil: "Zbruch", 2005, V. 2: К—О, S. 639. — ISBN 966-528-199-2.
