= Lisky, Ternopil Oblast =

Rural locality in Ternopil Oblast, Ukraine

Lisky Ліски
- Saint Volodymyr the Great church

- Location in Ternopil Oblast
- Coordinates: 49°41′3″N 25°43′57″E
- Country: Ukraine
- Oblast: Ternopil Oblast
- Raion: Ternopil Raion
- Hromada: Zbarazh urban hromada
- Time zone: UTC+2 (EET)
  - Summer (DST): UTC+3 (EEST)
- Postal code: 47300

Lisky (Ukrainian: Ліски) is a village in the Zbarazh urban hromada of the Ternopil Raion of Ternopil Oblast in Ukraine.

== History ==
The village has been known from the 17th century.

After the liquidation of the Zbarazh Raion on 19 July 2020, the village became part of the Ternopil Raion.

== Religion ==
- Saint Volodymyr the Great church (1992, brick).

== Sources ==
- (in Ukrainian) Басюк О., Хаварівський Б., Ліски // Ternopil Encyclopedic Dictionary: in 4 v. / editorial board: H. Yavorskyi and other, Ternopil: "Zbruch", 2005, V. 2: К—О, S. 376. — ISBN 966-528-199-2.
