= Stryivka =

Rural locality in Ternopil Oblast, Ukraine

Stryivka Стриївка
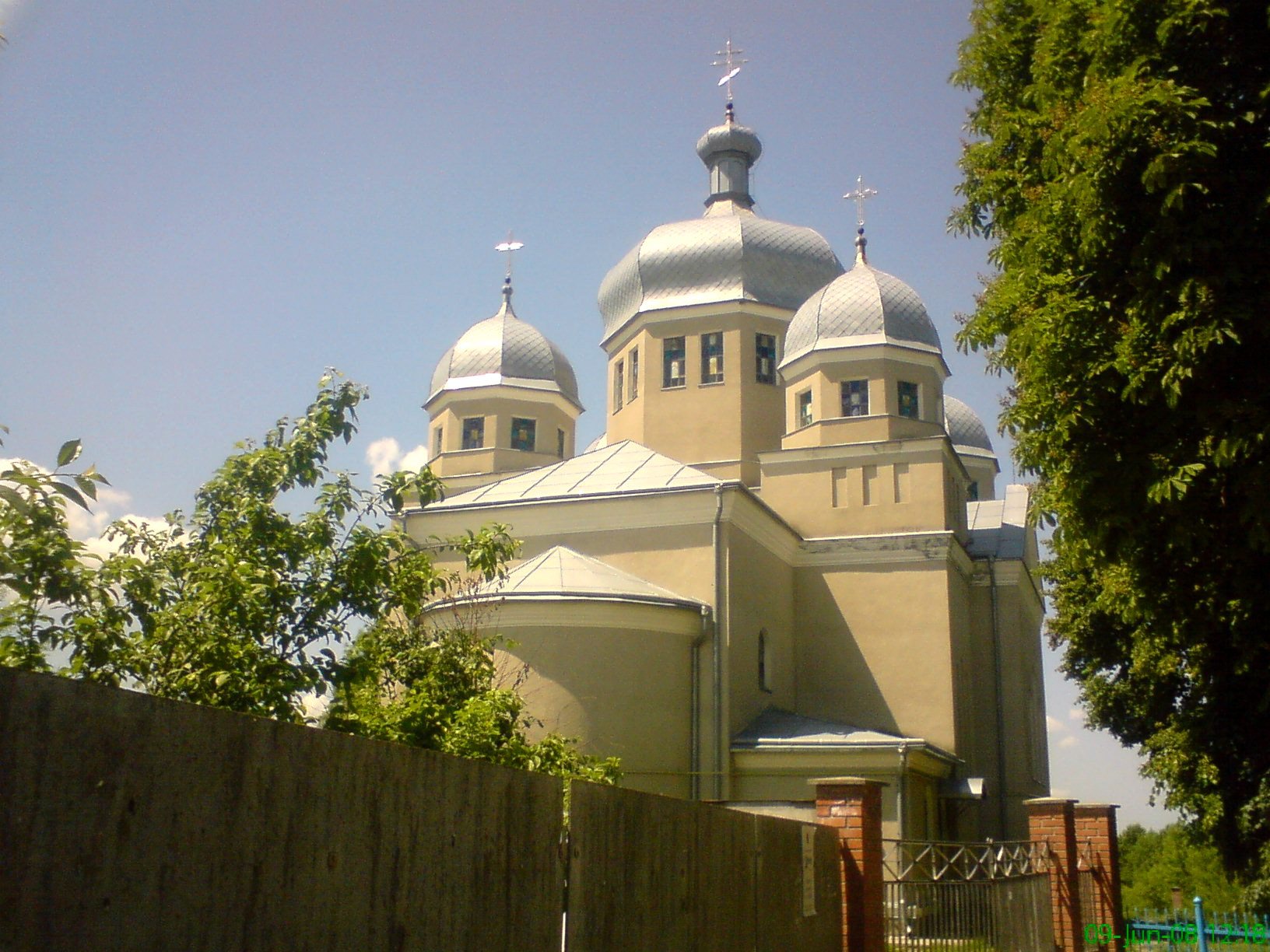
- Church located at sttiivka

- Location in Ternopil Oblast
- Coordinates: 49°36′16″N 25°49′8″E
- Country: Ukraine
- Oblast: Ternopil Oblast
- Raion: Ternopil Raion
- Hromada: Zbarazh urban hromada
- Time zone: UTC+2 (EET)
  - Summer (DST): UTC+3 (EEST)
- Postal code: 47371

Stryivka (Ukrainian: Стриївка) is a village in the Zbarazh urban hromada of the Ternopil Raion of Ternopil Oblast in Ukraine.

== History ==
The first written mention of the village was in 1431.

After the liquidation of the Zbarazh Raion on 19 July 2020, the village became part of the Ternopil Raion.

== Religion ==
- Saints Peter and Paul church (1997, brick).

== Sources ==
- (in Ukrainian) Уніят В., Стриївка // Ternopil Encyclopedic Dictionary: in 4 v. / editorial board: H. Yavorskyi and other, Ternopil: "Zbruch", 2008, V. 3: П—Я, S. 361. — ISBN 978-966-528-279-2.
- "Stryjówka". Geographical Dictionary of the Kingdom of Poland (in Polish). 11. Warszawa: Kasa im. Józefa Mianowskiego. 1890. p. 440.
