= Hnizdychne =

Rural locality in Ternopil Oblast, Ukraine

Hnizdychne Гніздичне
- the village settlement
- The Raions of Ternopil Oblast'
- Coordinates: 49°48′39″N 25°38′41″E
- Country: Ukraine
- Oblast: Ternopil Oblast
- District: Ternopil Raion
- Village settlement: village of Hnizdychne
- First mentioned: 1463

Population (2014)
  - Total: 1,146
  - Density: 392.92/km^{2} (1,017.7/sq mi)
- Time zone: UTC+2 (EET)
  - Summer (DST): UTC+3 (EEST)
- Postal code: 47332
- Area code: 3550

Hnizdychne (Ukrainian: Гніздичне, Polish: Hniezdyczna) is a rural settlement situated in Ternopil Raion of Ternopil Oblast, Ukraine. It belongs to Zbarazh urban hromada, one of the hromadas of Ukraine.

== History ==
Hnizdychne is a village of Zbarazh Ra'yon with its governing hub of the rural council that subordinates two adjoining rural settlements of Homy and Chesnivsky Rackovets'. With its two hamlets of Halatava and Salabai, Hnizdychne constitute a local territorial administration. Hnizdychne itself positioned 21 km away from Zbarazh Ray'on center and 17 km away from the nearest railroad station of Karnachivka. The territory contains 3.25 square km, and it has 319 households with its population of 1,146 people in 2014.

First written reference dates back to 1463 according to the documents reflecting property subdivision possession of Simon, between landlords Zbarazki. The village name, perhaps, has been derived from the local river hydronym of Gnizdna

In the year of 1518 the village became a property of Tetyana Holshanski, the wife of Konstantin Ostroski. Upon his death, it was given back to Ostroski. So, the possession timeline reflects the heritage of Ostroski in the 1583, Helena Potoki in the 1760, and Olga Hroholski in the 1890s .

On the eave of Berestechko Battle near a city of Gorohiv Raion, Volin' Oblast', in June 1651 in the vicinities of Gnizdichne the cossack-peasant military force had laid its route and had been spearheaded by renown hetman, Bogan Khem'lnitski.

In the year of 1855 the school of a local parish initiated the villagers education. On the 1890 a folwark broached a business and convenient store, one grade public school and the motel became available. There was operational branch of Prosvita society and a cell of cooperative union. In 1931 the village populated 1975 people, two grade public school provided education, industrial enterprise performed transactions and nine retail facilities had its sale market there. During the years of 1934 and 1939 the village constituted a territorial unit of the Kolodne gmina. Between July 3 of 1941 and March 5 of 1944 German occupiers entered the community.

Serving in the Red Army at the time of Nazi Germany and Soviet war, 67 village natives were killed or vanished.

On the May, 22 of 1947 Ukraine Gorilla Army unit disarmed the punitive battalion, Stanitsa, burning a building where they had been stationed.

In April, 1948 under coercion ruling the collective farm introduced, and in 1990 it plow shared.

In the 1965 the village name been changed to Gnizdichne replacing the ending from -o to -e as it previously sounded reflecting Russian pronunciation and transliteration.

The church of Holy Transformation built in 1832 and situated on the cross road hill and near by the village business hub. A memorial to the fallen soldiers of the Nazi-Soviet War erected in the 1973 that had been designed by sculptor, Formanov, and three commemorative crosses established.

Until 18 July 2020, Hnizdychne belonged to Zbarazh Raion. The raion was abolished in July 2020 as part of the administrative reform of Ukraine, which reduced the number of raions of Ternopil Oblast to three. The area of Zbarazh Raion was split between Kremenets and Ternopil Raions, with Hnizdychne being transferred to Ternopil Raion.

The village of Gnizdichne under its jurisdiction owns a public school equated to Elementary, Middle, and High School gradations. The community public sector has a club hose, a library, a medical emergency and family medicine practices. Also, a convenient stores, a coffee bar, a liquor store, and a pub complement the local marketplace.

Officer of Ukraine People's Army, then a priest, Mykita Petl'uk, lived in the years of 1898 to 1960.
