= Bazaryntsi =

Rural locality in Ternopil Oblast, Ukraine

Bazaryntsi Базаринці
- Location in Ternopil Oblast
- Coordinates: 49°40′34″N 25°47′10″E
- Country: Ukraine
- Oblast: Ternopil Oblast
- Raion: Ternopil Raion
- Hromada: Zbarazh urban hromada
- Time zone: UTC+2 (EET)
  - Summer (DST): UTC+3 (EEST)
- Postal code: 47305

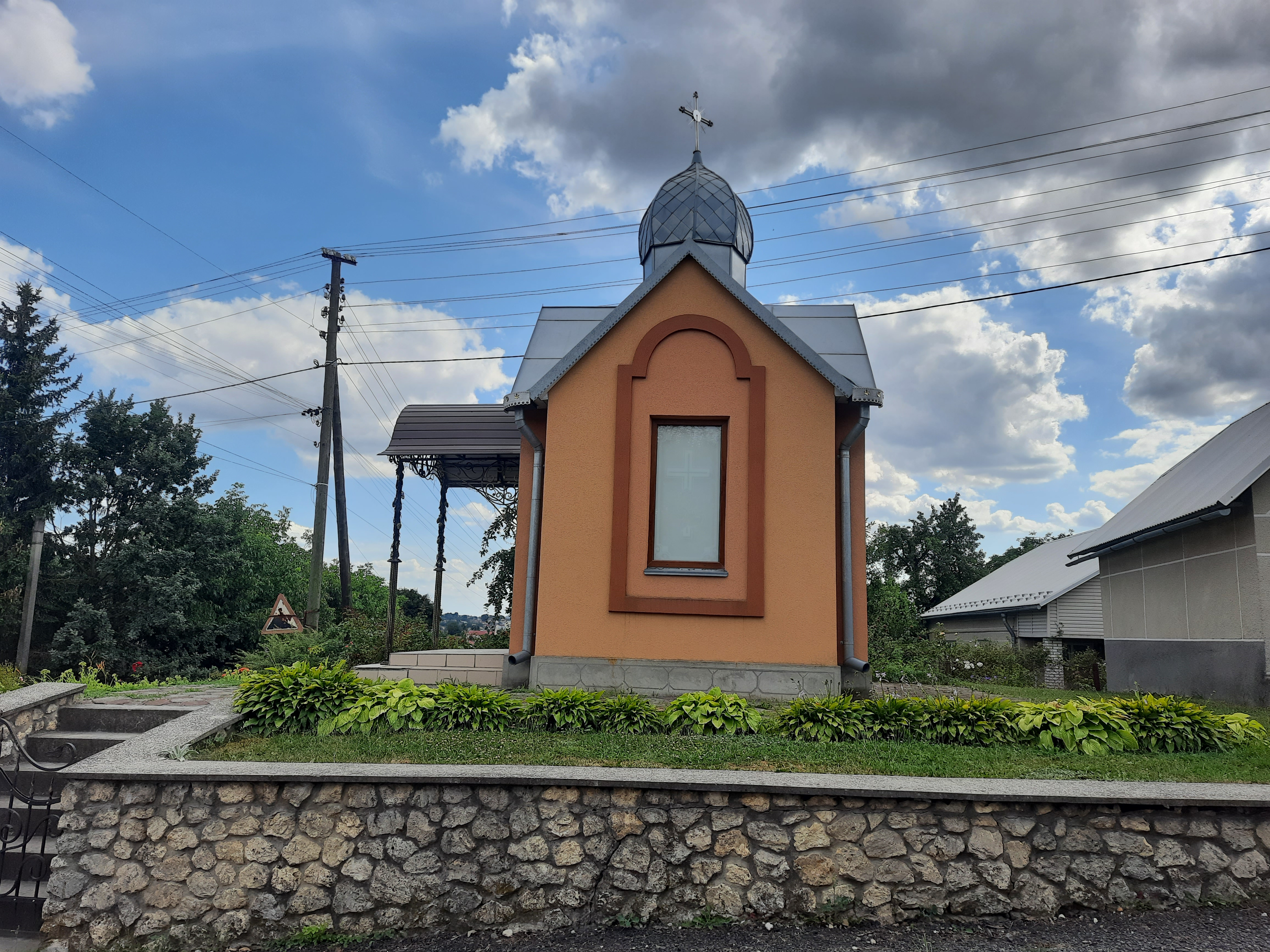
Chapel of the village of Bazaryntsi Ternopil district, Ternopil region

Bazaryntsi (Ukrainian: Базаринці) is a village in the Zbarazh urban hromada of the Ternopil Raion of Ternopil Oblast in Ukraine.

== History ==
The first written mention of the village was in 1589.

After the liquidation of the Zbarazh Raion on 19 July 2020, the village became part of the Ternopil Raion.

== Religion ==
- St. Michael church (1881–1888, brick; consecrated by Metropolitan Sylvester Sembratovych; restored in 1976).

== Sources ==
- (in Ukrainian) Воркун І., Уніят В., Базаринці // Ternopil Encyclopedic Dictionary: in 4 v. / editorial board: H. Yavorskyi and other, Ternopil: "Zbruch", 2004, V. 1: А—Й, S. 66. — ISBN 966-528-197-6.
- "Bazarzyńce". Geographical Dictionary of the Kingdom of Poland (in Polish). 1. Warszawa: Kasa im. Józefa Mianowskiego. 1880. p. 121.
