= Chesnivskyi Rakovets =

Rural locality in Ternopil Oblast, Ukraine

Chesnivskyi Rakovets Чеснівський Раковець
- Location in Ternopil Oblast
- Coordinates: 49°49′52″N 25°40′17″E
- Country: Ukraine
- Oblast: Ternopil Oblast
- Raion: Ternopil Raion
- Hromada: Zbarazh urban hromada
- Time zone: UTC+2 (EET)
  - Summer (DST): UTC+3 (EEST)
- Postal code: 47332

Chesnivskyi Rakovets (Ukrainian: Чеснівський Раковець) is a village in the Zbarazh urban hromada of the Ternopil Raion of Ternopil Oblast in Ukraine.

== History ==
The first written mention of the village was in 1629.

After the liquidation of the Zbarazh Raion on 19 July 2020, the village became part of the Ternopil Raion.

== Religion ==
- Church of the Exaltation of the Holy Cross (1860, wooden).

== Sources ==
- (in Ukrainian) Бойко В., Новосядла Н., Чеснівський Раковець // Ternopil Encyclopedic Dictionary: in 4 v. / editorial board: H. Yavorskyi and other, Ternopil: "Zbruch", 2008, V. 3: П—Я, S. 596. — ISBN 978-966-528-279-2.
