= Kapustyntsi =

Kapustyntsi (Ukrainian: Капустинці) may refer to the following places in Ukraine:

- Kapustyntsi, Boryspil Raion, Kyiv Oblast
- Kapustyntsi, Chortkiv Raion
- Kapustyntsi, Ternopil Raion, Ternopil Oblast
