= Hnizdechna =

River in Ternopil Oblast, Ukraine

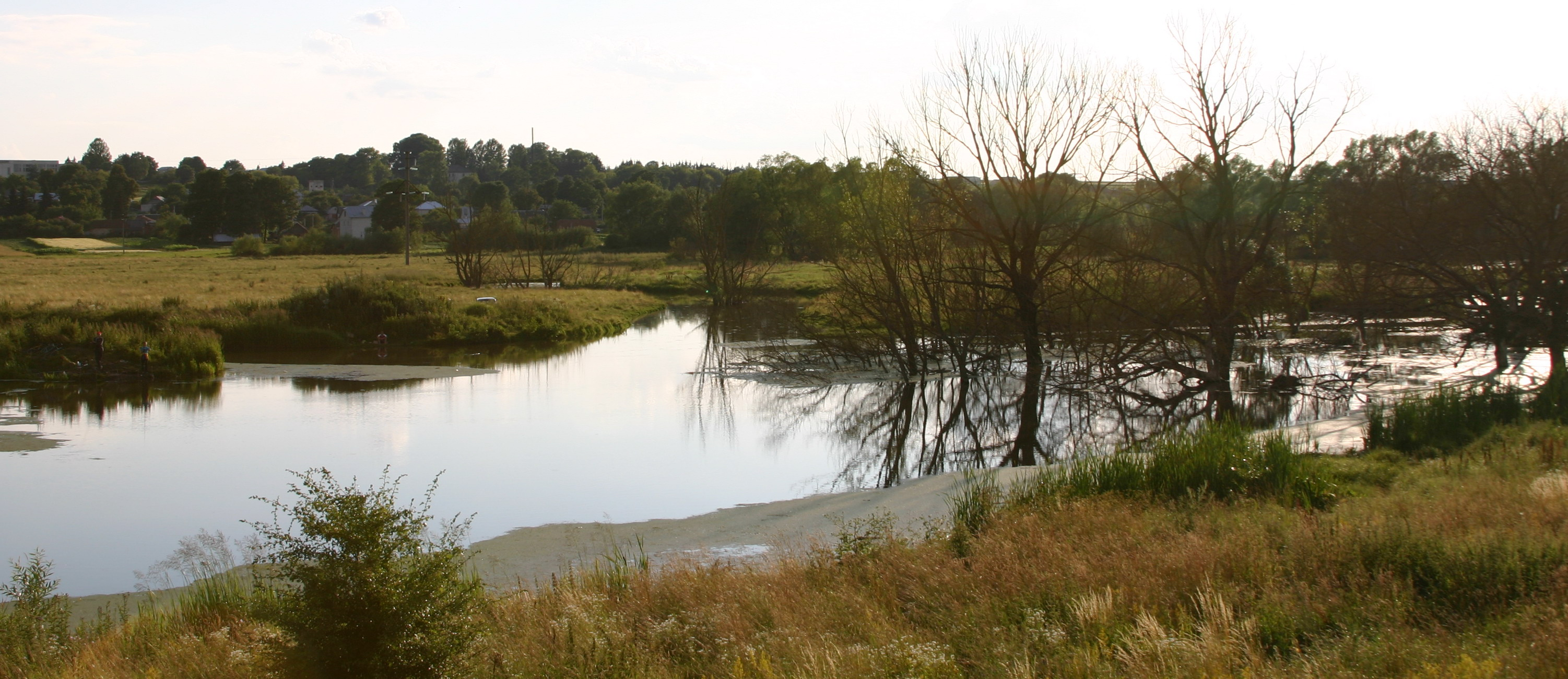
- The mouth of the Hnizdechna. View from Velyki Birky
- Native name: Гніздечна (Ukrainian)

Location
- Country: Ukraine

Physical characteristics
- Source
  - location: near Oprilivtsi
  - elevation: 49°30′36″N 25°44′16″E
- Mouth: Hnizna
  - coordinates: 49°46′26″N 25°35′38″E
- Length: 39 km (24 mi)

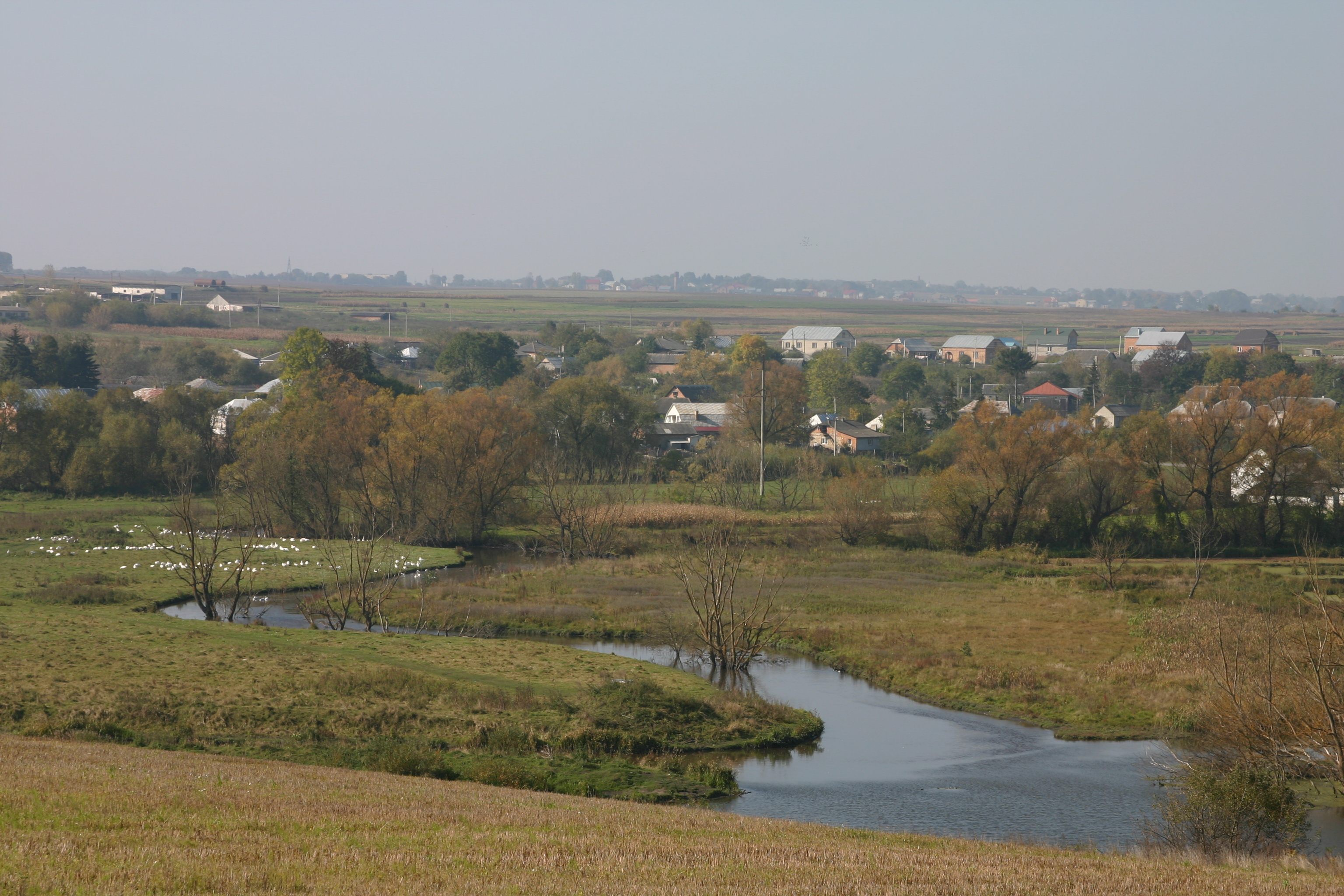
The mouth of the Hnizdechna

Hnizdechna (Ukrainian: Гніздечна) is a river in Ukraine which flows within the Ternopil Raion of Ternopil Oblast.

== Details ==
It is the right tributary of the river Hnizna from the Dniester basin.

It is 39 km long and covers an area of 264 km^{2}. It flows from springs near Oprilivtsi on the Tovtrovyi Ridge.

== Sources ==
- "Словник гідронімів України" (PDF). — К.: Наукова думка, 1979. — S. 143.
