= Tarasivka, Ternopil Oblast =

Rural locality in Ternopil Oblast, Ukraine

Tarasivka Тарасівка
- Location in Ternopil Oblast
- Coordinates: 49°41′15″N 25°47′59″E
- Country: Ukraine
- Oblast: Ternopil Oblast
- Raion: Ternopil Raion
- Hromada: Zbarazh urban hromada
- Time zone: UTC+2 (EET)
  - Summer (DST): UTC+3 (EEST)
- Postal code: 47302

Tarasivka (Ukrainian: Тарасівка) is a village in the Zbarazh urban hromada of the Ternopil Raion of Ternopil Oblast in Ukraine.

== History ==
The first written mention of the village was in 1463.

After the liquidation of the Zbarazh Raion on 19 July 2020, the village became part of the Ternopil Raion.

== Religion ==
- Saint John the Apostle church (1920s, brick).

== Notable residents ==
The village was visited by writers and public figures Vasyl Stefanyk and Ivan Franko (1901, 1902).

== Sources ==
- (in Ukrainian) Уніят В., Тарасівка // Ternopil Encyclopedic Dictionary: in 4 v. / editorial board: H. Yavorskyi and other, Ternopil: "Zbruch", 2008, V. 3: П—Я, S. 382. — ISBN 978-966-528-279-2.
- "Tarasówka". Geographical Dictionary of the Kingdom of Poland (in Polish). 12. Warszawa: Kasa im. Józefa Mianowskiego. 1892. p. 160.
