= Kretivtsi =

Rural locality in Ternopil Oblast, Ukraine

Kretivtsi Кретівці
- Location in Ternopil Oblast
- Coordinates: 49°38′2″N 25°50′24″E
- Country: Ukraine
- Oblast: Ternopil Oblast
- Raion: Ternopil Raion
- Hromada: Zbarazh urban hromada
- Time zone: UTC+2 (EET)
  - Summer (DST): UTC+3 (EEST)
- Postal code: 47382

Kretivtsi (Ukrainian: Кретівці) is a village in the Zbarazh urban hromada of the Ternopil Raion of Ternopil Oblast in Ukraine.

== History ==
The first written mention of the village was in 1463.

After the liquidation of the Zbarazh Raion on 19 July 2020, the village became part of the Ternopil Raion.

== Religion ==
- Church of the Intercession (brick; rebuilt in the early 1990s from a Roman Catholic church).

== Sources ==
- (in Ukrainian) Машлянка О., Хаварівський Б., Кретівці // Ternopil Encyclopedic Dictionary: in 4 v. / editorial board: H. Yavorskyi and other, Ternopil: "Zbruch", 2005, V. 2: К—О, S. 233. — ISBN 966-528-199-2.
- "Kretowce, wś, powiat zbaraski". Geographical Dictionary of the Kingdom of Poland (in Polish). 4. Warszawa: Kasa im. Józefa Mianowskiego. 1883. p. 665.
