= Kydantsi =

Rural locality in Ternopil Oblast, Ukraine

Kydantsi Киданці
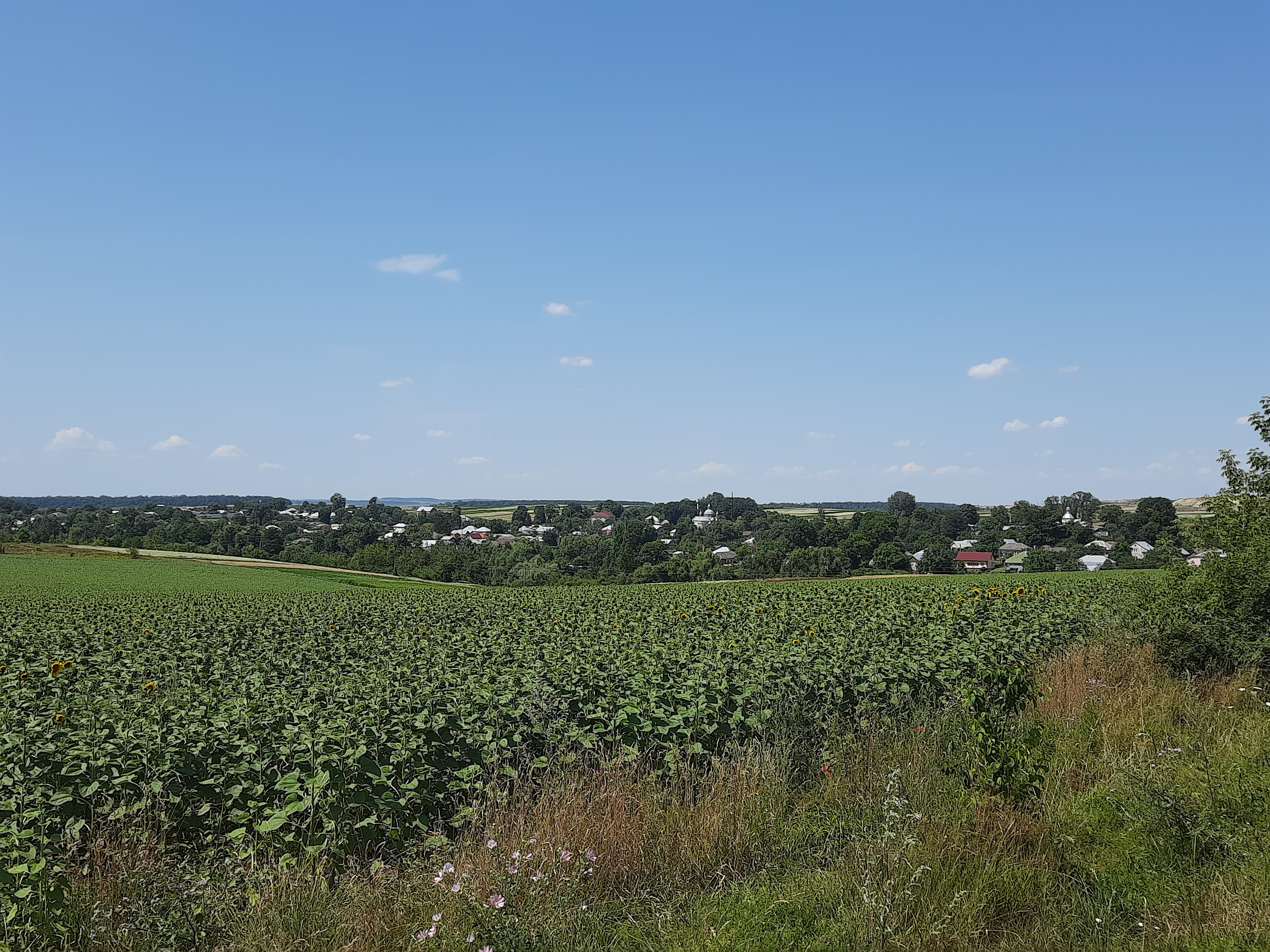
- Kydantsi village

- Location in Ternopil Oblast
- Coordinates: 49°34′7″N 25°52′6″E
- Country: Ukraine
- Oblast: Ternopil Oblast
- Raion: Ternopil Raion
- Hromada: Zbarazh urban hromada
- Time zone: UTC+2 (EET)
  - Summer (DST): UTC+3 (EEST)
- Postal code: 47374

Kydantsi (Ukrainian: Kydantsi) is a village in the Zbarazh urban hromada of the Ternopil Raion of Ternopil Oblast in Ukraine.

== History ==
The first written mention of the village was in 1444.

After the liquidation of the Zbarazh Raion on 19 July 2020, the village became part of the Ternopil Raion.

== Religion ==
- Two churches of St. Demetrius (wooden, built in the 16th century, and brought to Kydantsi in the mid-17th century from Volyn; rebuilt in 1870; 1996, brick),
- ruins of the Roman Catholic church (1895).

== Sources ==
- (in Ukrainian) Івасько М., Лашта В., Киданці // Ternopil Encyclopedic Dictionary: in 4 v. / editorial board: H. Yavorskyi and other, Ternopil: "Zbruch", 2005, V. 2: К—О, S. 66. — ISBN 966-528-199-2.
- "Kujdańce 2.) K., wś, pow. zbaraski". Geographical Dictionary of the Kingdom of Poland (in Polish). 4. Warszawa: Kasa im. Józefa Mianowskiego. 1883. p. 852.
