= Kapustynskyi Lis =

Rural locality in Ternopil Oblast, Ukraine

Kapustynskyi Lis Капустинський Ліс
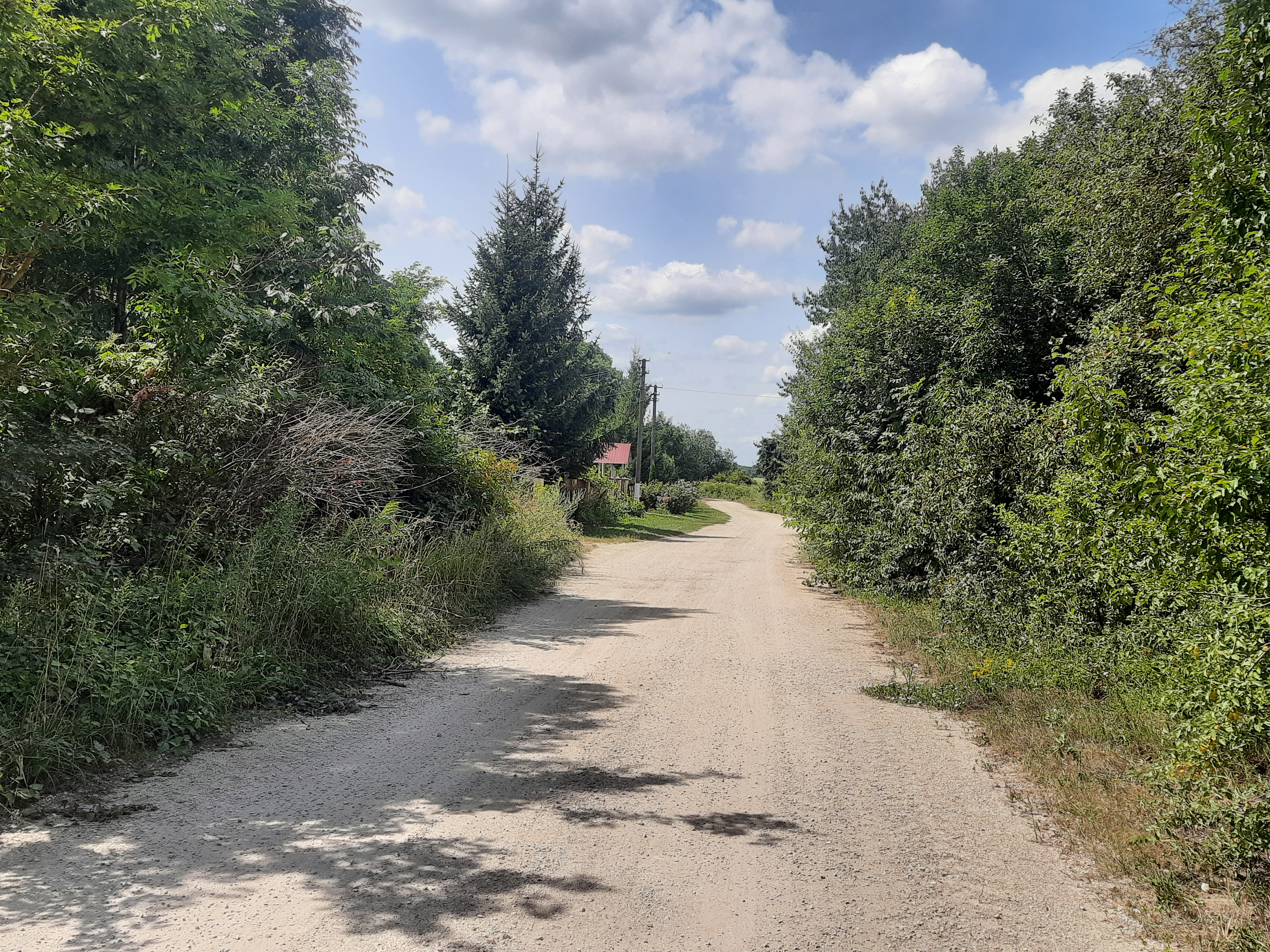
- Entrance to the village of Kapustinsky Forest Ternopil district, Ternopil region

- Location in Ternopil Oblast
- Coordinates: 49°44′21″N 25°46′40″E
- Country: Ukraine
- Oblast: Ternopil Oblast
- Raion: Ternopil Raion
- Hromada: Zbarazh urban hromada
- Time zone: UTC+2 (EET)
  - Summer (DST): UTC+3 (EEST)
- Postal code: 47350

Kapustynskyi Lis (Ukrainian: Капустинський Ліс) is a village in the Zbarazh urban hromada of the Ternopil Raion of Ternopil Oblast in Ukraine.

== History ==
The first written mention of the village was in 1870.

After the liquidation of the Zbarazh Raion on 19 July 2020, the village became part of the Ternopil Raion.

== Sources ==
- (in Ukrainian) Ханас В., Капустинський Ліс // Ternopil Encyclopedic Dictionary: in 4 v. / editorial board: H. Yavorskyi and other, Ternopil: "Zbruch", 2005, V. 2: К—О, S. 29–30. — ISBN 966-528-199-2.
