= Ivashkivtsi, Ternopil Oblast =

Ivashkivtsi Івашківці
- Village
- Location in Ternopil Oblast Location in Ukraine
- Coordinates: 49°39′58″N 25°40′11″E
- Country: Ukraine
- Oblast: Ternopil
- Raion: Ternopil
- Hromada: Zbarazh
- Founded: 1760
- Elevation: 332 m (1,089 ft)
- Population (2001): 244
- Time zone: UTC+2 (EET)
  - Summer (DST): UTC+3 (EEST)
- Postal code: 47343
- Area code: +380 3550

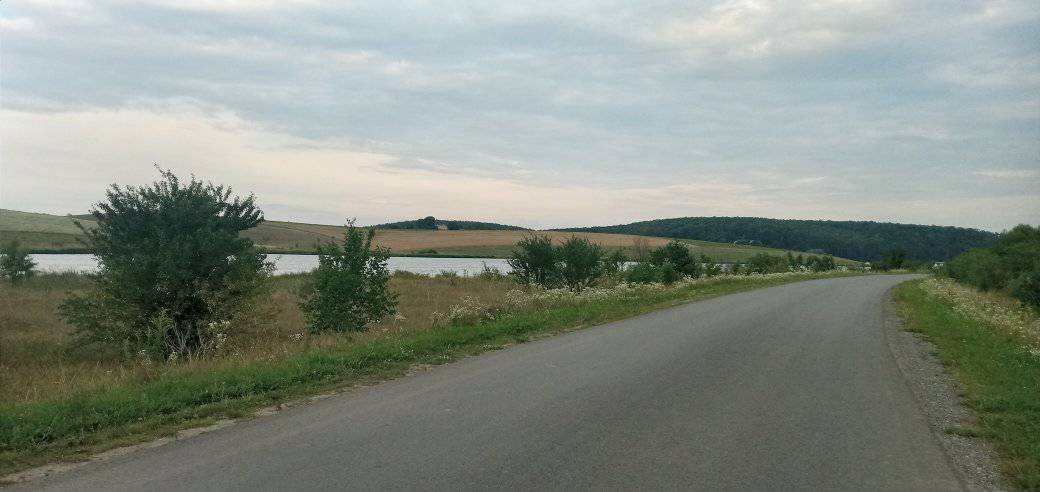

Ivashkivtsi (Ukrainian: Івашківці, Polish: Iwaszkowice) is a village (selo) in Ternopil Raion, Ternopil Oblast, in south-west Ukraine. It belongs to Zbarazh urban hromada, one of the hromadas of Ukraine.

== History ==
Ivashkivtsi was founded in 1760.

Until 18 July 2020, Ivashkivtsi belonged to Turka Raion. Zbarazh Raion. The raion was abolished in July 2020 as part of the administrative reform of Ukraine, which reduced the number of raions of Ternopil Oblast to three. The area of Zbarazh Raion was split between Kremenets and Ternopil Raions, with Ivashkivtsi being transferred to Ternopil Raion.
