= Hory-Stryiovetski =

Rural locality in Ternopil Oblast, Ukraine

Hory-Stryiovetski Гори-Стрийовецькі
- Location in Ternopil Oblast
- Coordinates: 49°34′42″N 25°54′53″E
- Country: Ukraine
- Oblast: Ternopil Oblast
- Raion: Ternopil Raion
- Hromada: Zbarazh urban hromada
- Time zone: UTC+2 (EET)
  - Summer (DST): UTC+3 (EEST)
- Postal code: 47372

Hory-Stryiovetski (Ukrainian: Гори-Стрийовецькі) is a village in the Zbarazh urban hromada of the Ternopil Raion of Ternopil Oblast in Ukraine.

== History ==
The first written mention of the village was in 1890.

After the liquidation of the Zbarazh Raion on 19 July 2020, the village became part of the Ternopil Raion.

== Religion ==
- Church of the Nativity of John the Baptist (early 20th century, brick).

== Sources ==
- (in Ukrainian) Дзядик Б., Лашта В., Гори-Стрийовецькі // Ternopil Encyclopedic Dictionary: in 4 v. / editorial board: H. Yavorskyi and other, Ternopil: "Zbruch", 2004, V. 1: А—Й, S. 395. — ISBN 966-528-197-6.
