= Nyzhchi Lubianky =

Rural locality in Ternopil Oblast, Ukraine

Nyzhchi Lubianky Нижчі Луб'яки
- Location in Ternopil Oblast Nyzhchi Lubianky (Ternopil Oblast)
- Coordinates: 49°40′24″N 25°49′23″E
- Country: Ukraine
- Oblast: Ternopil Oblast
- Raion: Ternopil Raion
- Hromada: Zbarazh urban hromada
- Time zone: UTC+2 (EET)
  - Summer (DST): UTC+3 (EEST)
- Postal code: 47361

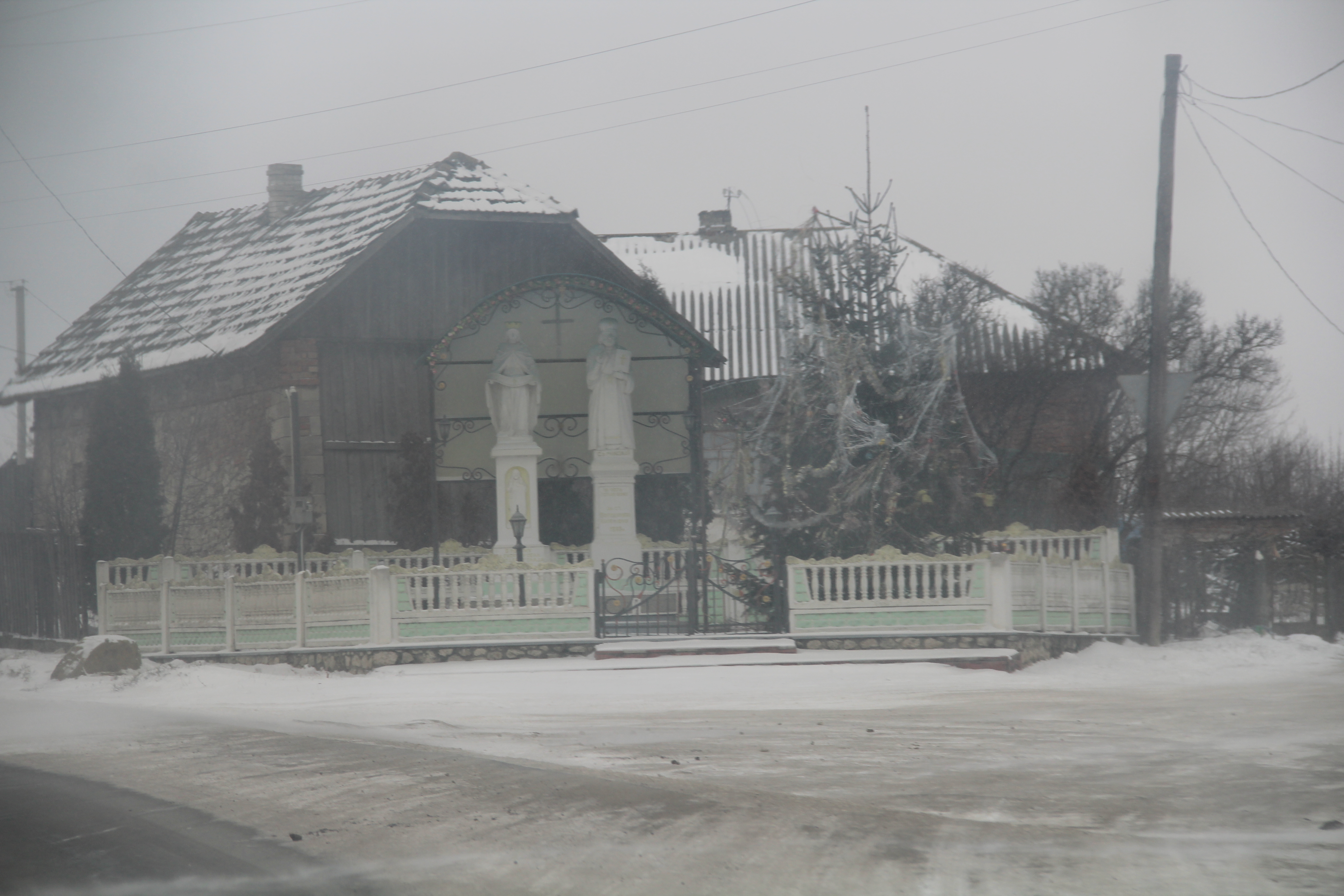
Sculptures of Saints Vladimir and Olga in Nyzhchie Lubyanka (Year Unknown)

Nyzhchi Lubianky (Ukrainian: Нижчі Луб'янки) is a village in the Zbarazh urban hromada of the Ternopil Raion of Ternopil Oblast in Ukraine.

== History ==
The first written mention of the village was in 1463.

After the liquidation of the Zbarazh Raion on 19 July 2020, the village became part of the Ternopil Raion.

== Religion ==
- Church of the Intercession (1868, brick).

== Sources ==
- (in Ukrainian) Мельничук Б., Уніят В., Нижчі Луб'янки // Ternopil Encyclopedic Dictionary: in 4 v. / editorial board: H. Yavorskyi and other, Ternopil: "Zbruch", 2005, V. 2: К—О, S. 628. — ISBN 966-528-199-2.
- "Łubianki Niżne (pow. zbaraski)". Geographical Dictionary of the Kingdom of Poland (in Polish). 5. Warszawa: Kasa im. Józefa Mianowskiego. 1884. p. 772.
