= Dzus =

Dzus may refer to:

- Asteroid 3687 Dzus
- Dzus fastener
