= Palace in Kolodne =

- 49°45′34″N 25°42′50″E
- Location: Kolodne, Ternopil Raion, Zbarazh Hromada, Ternopil Oblast, Ukraine

Palace in Kolodne a lost historic building in Kolodne of the Zbarazh Hromada of the Ternopil Raion of the Ternopil Oblast. It is immortalized in the drawings of Napoleon Orda.

== History ==
In 1782–1783, the owners of Kolodne, the Świejkowski family, built a palace on the site of the castle.

...there is not a trace of the ancient castle of the Ostrogski princes in Kolodne. The landowner's palace, built by Świejkowski, stands on the ramparts that survived. A wide, shady and majestic chestnut alley leads to it. There is a nice garden.

— Mykola Teodorovych with reference to Tadeusz Stecki,

Until 1914, the hetman's mace and the private correspondence of Polish King John III Sobieski were kept in a special hiding place in the estate.

In 1939, a five-year school, a village council, and a road department were opened in the old building. In 1941, it was owned by a German. In August 1943, the palace was burned down.

== Description ==
The estate had 36 rooms and three entrances. A park was planted around it, a greenhouse and a greenhouse were built.

== Sources ==
- (in Ukrainian) Уніят, В., Колодне // Ternopil region. History of cities and villages: in 3 v. / Ternopil: "Terno-graph", 2014, V. 2: Г—Л, S. 272. — ISBN 978-966-457-228-3.
