= Reshnivka, Ternopil Oblast =

Rural locality in Ternopil Oblast, Ukraine

Reshnivka Решнівка
- Location in Ternopil Oblast
- Coordinates: 49°47′58″N 25°47′51″E
- Country: Ukraine
- Oblast: Ternopil Oblast
- Raion: Ternopil Raion
- Hromada: Zbarazh urban hromada
- Time zone: UTC+2 (EET)
  - Summer (DST): UTC+3 (EEST)
- Postal code: 47336

Reshnivka (Ukrainian: Решнівка) is a village in the Zbarazh urban hromada of the Ternopil Raion of Ternopil Oblast in Ukraine.

== History ==
The first written mention of the village was in 1463.

After the liquidation of the Zbarazh Raion on 19 July 2020, the village became part of the Ternopil Raion.

== Religion ==
- Church of the Transfiguration (1759, wooden; rebuilt in 1888, brick, with the miraculous icon of the Mother of God "Joy to All Who Sorrow"; a cave has been preserved under the church).

== Sources ==
- (in Ukrainian) Гуцал П., Уніят В., Решнівка // Ternopil Encyclopedic Dictionary: in 4 v. / editorial board: H. Yavorskyi and other, Ternopil: "Zbruch", 2008, V. 3: П—Я, S. 176. — ISBN 978-966-528-279-2.
- "Rześniówka, pow. krzemieniecki, wł. Świejkowskich". Geographical Dictionary of the Kingdom of Poland (in Polish). 10. Warszawa: Kasa im. Józefa Mianowskiego. 1889. p. 150.
