= Maksymivka =

Maksymivka (Ukrainian: Максимівка) may refer to several places in Ukraine:

- Maksymivka, Mykolaiv Raion, Mykolaiv Oblast
- Maksymivka, Ternopil Oblast
