= Syniahivka =

Rural locality in Ternopil Oblast, Ukraine

Syniahivka Синягівка
- Location in Ternopil Oblast
- Coordinates: 49°41′8″N 25°54′5″E
- Country: Ukraine
- Oblast: Ternopil Oblast
- Raion: Ternopil Raion
- Hromada: Zbarazh urban hromada
- Time zone: UTC+2 (EET)
  - Summer (DST): UTC+3 (EEST)
- Postal code: 47352

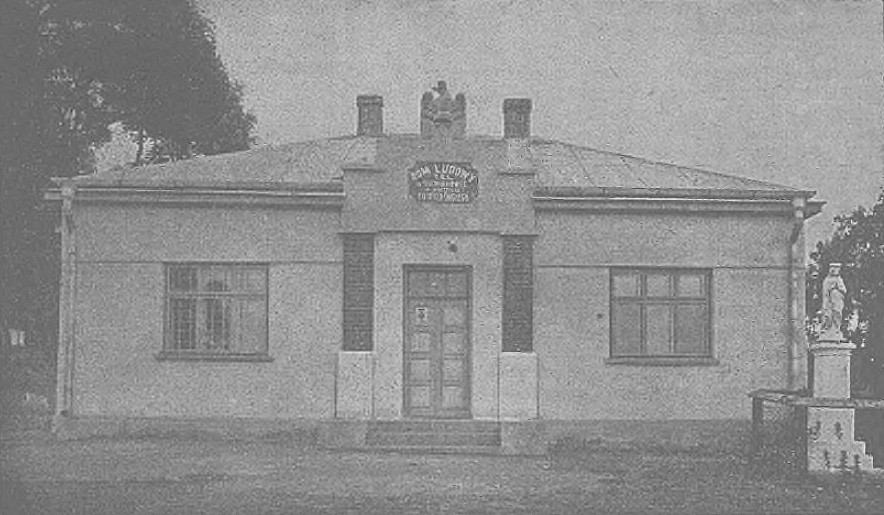
TSL People's House in Sieniachówka (1938)

Syniahivka (Ukrainian: Синягівка) is a village in the Zbarazh urban hromada of the Ternopil Raion of Ternopil Oblast in Ukraine.

== History ==
The village has been known from the 16th century.

After the liquidation of the Zbarazh Raion on 19 July 2020, the village became part of the Ternopil Raion.

== Religion ==
- Church of the Nativity of the Blessed Virgin Mary (rebuilt in 1924; 1932, brick).

== Sources ==
- "Sieniahówka". Geographical Dictionary of the Kingdom of Poland (in Polish). 10. Warszawa: Kasa im. Józefa Mianowskiego. 1889. p. 557.
