= Hlynchuky =

Rural locality in Ternopil Oblast, Ukraine

Hlynchuky Глинчуки
- Location in Ternopil Oblast
- Coordinates: 49°44′20″N 25°40′32″E
- Country: Ukraine
- Oblast: Ternopil Oblast
- Raion: Ternopil Raion
- Hromada: Zbarazh urban hromada
- Time zone: UTC+2 (EET)
  - Summer (DST): UTC+3 (EEST)
- Postal code: 47335

Hlynchuky (Ukrainian: Глинчуки) is a village in the Zbarazh urban hromada of the Ternopil Raion of Ternopil Oblast in Ukraine.

== History ==
The village was founded in 1895.

After the liquidation of the Zbarazh Raion on 19 July 2020, the village became part of the Ternopil Raion.

== Sources ==
- (in Ukrainian) Лашта В., Глинчуки // Ternopil Encyclopedic Dictionary: in 4 v. / editorial board: H. Yavorskyi and other, Ternopil: "Zbruch", 2004, V. 1: А—Й, S. 364. — ISBN 966-528-197-6.
