= Zarubyntsi, Zbarazh urban hromada, Ternopil Raion, Ternopil Oblast =

Rural locality in Ternopil Oblast, Ukraine

Coordinates: 49.6919°N 25.6906°E

Zarubyntsi (Ukrainian: Зарубинці, Polish: Zarubińce) is a small village in Ukraine (formerly in Poland), situated 6–7 km from Zbarazh in Ternopil Raion of Ternopil Oblast. Population 653, cens 2001. It is the constituent village of the Greek Catholic parish of Zarubyntsi, in the deanery of Zbarazh and it belongs to the Roman Catholic parish of Opryłowce. Zarubyntsi belongs to Zbarazh urban hromada, one of the hromadas of Ukraine.

== History ==
In 1890 its total area was 657 Wlóka (One Wloka being 30 Morg – which was generally considered enough for 1 family; 1 morg being approximately 1.422 acres) under cultivation, 63 meadows and gardens, 10 pastures, and 233 Morg of woodlands. In 1890 there were also 75 houses, with 485 residents in the township with another 28 houses, occupied by 77 people situated on the estate. Of these, 431 were Greek Catholic, 121 Roman Catholic, and 10 Jewish. 431 villagers were Rusyns, 121 Poles and 10 were Germans.

In 1929, there existed one major land owner, a distillery, a stone quarry, a cart/wheelwright, a blacksmith, a tailors, a mill, an oil merchant, and a cobbler. The distillery still exists; currently named “Zarubyntsi Spirits Distillery”. There were also a few cooperatives including “Kólko Rolnicze” from which people could hire agricultural machinery as well as Buducznist and Pomiczt.

The nearest amenities including post office, railway, and medic were all situated in Zbaraż. Isaak Altstädter was the largest proprietor in the village owning the majority of the industry as well as the manorial estate. In 1944 after the redrawing of European boundaries, Zarubyntsi became part of the Ukrainian Soviet Socialist Republic, and after the break-up of the Soviet Union part of the independent Ukraine.

Until 18 July 2020, Zarubyntsi belonged to Zbarazh Raion. The raion was abolished in July 2020 as part of the administrative reform of Ukraine, which reduced the number of raions of Ternopil Oblast to three. The area of Zbarazh Raion was split between Kremenets and Ternopil Raions, with Zarubyntsi being transferred to Ternopil Raion.

== Sources ==
- Slownik Geograficzny -
- 1929 Polish business directory -
