= Roznoshyntsi =

Rural locality in Ternopil Oblast, Ukraine

Roznoshyntsi Розношинці
- Location in Ternopil Oblast
- Coordinates: 49°42′17″N 25°49′47″E
- Country: Ukraine
- Oblast: Ternopil Oblast
- Raion: Ternopil Raion
- Hromada: Zbarazh urban hromada
- Time zone: UTC+2 (EET)
  - Summer (DST): UTC+3 (EEST)
- Postal code: 47353

Roznoshyntsi (Ukrainian: Розношинці) is a village in the Zbarazh urban hromada of the Ternopil Raion of Ternopil Oblast in Ukraine.

== History ==
The first written mention of the village was in 1464.

After the liquidation of the Zbarazh Raion on 19 July 2020, the village became part of the Ternopil Raion.

== Religion ==
- St. George church (1860, brick).

== Notable residents ==
- Arcadia Olenska-Petryshyn (1934–1996), Ukrainian-born American artist, art critic and editor

== Sources ==
- (in Ukrainian) Уніят В., Ханас Вас., Розношинці // Ternopil Encyclopedic Dictionary: in 4 v. / editorial board: H. Yavorskyi and other, Ternopil: "Zbruch", 2008, V. 3: П—Я, S. 189. — ISBN 978-966-528-279-2.
- "Roznoszyńce". Geographical Dictionary of the Kingdom of Poland (in Polish). 9. Warszawa: Kasa im. Józefa Mianowskiego. 1888. p. 841.
