= Ivanchany =

Rural locality in Ternopil Oblast, Ukraine

Ivanchany Іванчани
- Location in Ternopil Oblast
- Coordinates: 49°45′0″N 25°36′56″E
- Country: Ukraine
- Oblast: Ternopil Oblast
- Raion: Ternopil Raion
- Hromada: Zbarazh urban hromada
- Time zone: UTC+2 (EET)
  - Summer (DST): UTC+3 (EEST)
- Postal code: 47340

Ivanchany (Ukrainian: Іванчани) is a village in the Zbarazh urban hromada of the Ternopil Raion of Ternopil Oblast in Ukraine.

== History ==
The first written mention of the village was in 1463.

After the liquidation of the Zbarazh Raion on 19 July 2020, the village became part of the Ternopil Raion.

== Religion ==
- Saint John the Baptist church (1991; brick).

== Sources ==
- "Iwaniczany". Geographical Dictionary of the Kingdom of Poland (in Polish). 3. Warszawa: Kasa im. Józefa Mianowskiego. 1882. p. 311.
