= Zaruddia, Zbarazh urban hromada, Ternopil Raion, Ternopil Oblast =

Rural locality in Ternopil Oblast, Ukraine

Zaruddia Заруддя
- Location in Ternopil Oblast
- Coordinates: 49°47′28″N 25°44′2″E
- Country: Ukraine
- Oblast: Ternopil Oblast
- Raion: Ternopil Raion
- Hromada: Zbarazh urban hromada
- Time zone: UTC+2 (EET)
  - Summer (DST): UTC+3 (EEST)
- Postal code: 47333

Zaruddia (Ukrainian: Заруддя, Polish: Zarudzie) is a village in the Zbarazh urban hromada of the Ternopil Raion of Ternopil Oblast in Ukraine.

== History ==
The first written mention of the village was in 1564.

In the Second Polish Republic, the town was the seat of the rural commune of Zarudzie until October 1, 1933, and then of the rural commune of Kołodno in Krzemieniec County, Volhynia Voivodeship. At that time, it was inhabited primarily by Ukrainians, with only a few Polish and Jewish families.

In July 1943, Ukrainian nationalists from the OUN-UPA killed all Polish residents and burned their homes, as a part of Volhynia genocide.

After the liquidation of the Zbarazh Raion on July 19, 2020, the village became part of the Ternopil Raion.

== Religion ==
- Church of the Nativity of the Blessed Virgin Mary (1874; wooden, restored in 2007–2009).

== Sources ==
- "Zarudzie (3)". Geographical Dictionary of the Kingdom of Poland (in Polish). 14. Warszawa: Kasa im. Józefa Mianowskiego. 1895. p. 426.
- "Zarudzie (3)". Geographical Dictionary of the Kingdom of Poland (in Polish). 14. Warszawa: Kasa im. Józefa Mianowskiego. 1895. p. 427.
