= Chornyi Lis, Zbarazh urban hromada, Ternopil Raion, Ternopil Oblast =

Rural locality in Ternopil Oblast, Ukraine

Chornyi Lis Чорний Ліс
- Location in Ternopil Oblast
- Coordinates: 49°42′59″N 25°45′26″E
- Country: Ukraine
- Oblast: Ternopil Oblast
- Raion: Ternopil Raion
- Hromada: Zbarazh urban hromada
- Time zone: UTC+2 (EET)
  - Summer (DST): UTC+3 (EEST)
- Postal code: 47301

Chornyi Lis (Ukrainian: Чорний Ліс) is a village in the Zbarazh urban hromada of the Ternopil Raion of Ternopil Oblast in Ukraine.

== History ==
The village has been known from the 19th century.

After the liquidation of the Zbarazh Raion on 19 July 2020, the village became part of the Ternopil Raion.

== Religion ==
- Church of All Saints (1935, brick; consecrated by Bishop Nykyta Budka),
- Roman Catholic Church of St. Mary the Virgin (1930, brick, restored in 2001).

== Sources ==
- (in Ukrainian) Олещук І., Чорний Ліс // Ternopil Encyclopedic Dictionary: in 4 v. / editorial board: H. Yavorskyi and other, Ternopil: "Zbruch", 2008, V. 3: П—Я, S. 602. — ISBN 978-966-528-279-2.
