= Kapustyntsi, Ternopil Raion, Ternopil Oblast =

Rural locality in Ternopil Oblast, Ukraine

Kapustyntsi Капустинці
- Location in Ternopil Oblast
- Coordinates: 49°43′44″N 25°48′59″E
- Country: Ukraine
- Oblast: Ternopil Oblast
- Raion: Ternopil Raion
- Hromada: Zbarazh urban hromada
- Time zone: UTC+2 (EET)
  - Summer (DST): UTC+3 (EEST)
- Postal code: 47350

Kapustyntsi (Ukrainian: Капустинці) is a village in the Zbarazh urban hromada of the Ternopil Raion of Ternopil Oblast in Ukraine.

== History ==
The village has been known from the 16th century.

After the liquidation of the Zbarazh Raion on 19 July 2020, the village became part of the Ternopil Raion.

== Religion ==
- St. Michael church (rebuilt from a Roman Catholic church in the 1990s).

== Sources ==
- (in Ukrainian) Драпала М., Уніят В., Капустинці // Ternopil Encyclopedic Dictionary: in 4 v. / editorial board: H. Yavorskyi and other, Ternopil: "Zbruch", 2005, V. 2: К—О, S. 30. — ISBN 966-528-199-2.
- "Kapuścińce 2) powiat zbaraski". Geographical Dictionary of the Kingdom of Poland (in Polish). 3. Warszawa: Kasa im. Józefa Mianowskiego. 1882. p. 826.
