= Krasnosiltsi, Ternopil Oblast =

Rural locality in Ternopil Oblast, Ukraine

Krasnosiltsi Красносільці
- Location in Ternopil Oblast
- Coordinates: 49°42′58″N 25°49′30″E
- Country: Ukraine
- Oblast: Ternopil Oblast
- Raion: Ternopil Raion
- Hromada: Zbarazh urban hromada
- Time zone: UTC+2 (EET)
  - Summer (DST): UTC+3 (EEST)
- Postal code: 47353

Krasnosiltsi (Ukrainian: Красносільці) is a village in the Zbarazh urban hromada of the Ternopil Raion of Ternopil Oblast in Ukraine.

== History ==
The village is known from the 1st half of the 17th century.

After the liquidation of the Zbarazh Raion on 19 July 2020, the village became part of the Ternopil Raion.

== Religion ==
- Saint Demetrius church (1878, brick, restored in 1930; the mural was painted in 1890 by Kornylo Ustyianovych).

== Sources ==
- (in Ukrainian) Уніят В., Красносільці // Ternopil Encyclopedic Dictionary: in 4 v. / editorial board: H. Yavorskyi and other, Ternopil: "Zbruch", 2005, V. 2: К—О, S. 220. — ISBN 966-528-199-2.
- "Krasnosielce". Geographical Dictionary of the Kingdom of Poland (in Polish). 6. Warszawa: Kasa im. Józefa Mianowskiego. 1885. p. 639.
