= Maksymivka, Ternopil Oblast =

Rural locality in Ternopil Oblast, Ukraine

Maksymivka Максимівка
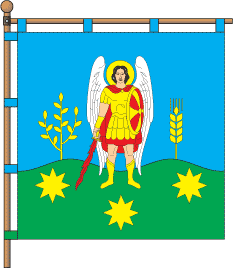
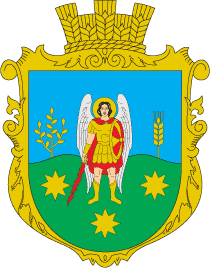
- Flag Coat of arms

- Location in Ternopil Oblast
- Coordinates: 49°36′0″N 25°53′54″E
- Country: Ukraine
- Oblast: Ternopil Oblast
- Raion: Ternopil Raion
- Hromada: Zbarazh urban hromada
- Time zone: UTC+2 (EET)
  - Summer (DST): UTC+3 (EEST)
- Postal code: 47372

Maksymivka (Ukrainian: Максимівка) is a village in the Zbarazh urban hromada of the Ternopil Raion of Ternopil Oblast in Ukraine.

== History ==
The village is known from the 1st half of the 17th century.

After the liquidation of the Zbarazh Raion on 19 July 2020, the village became part of the Ternopil Raion.

== Religion ==
- St. Michael church (1994, architect V. Skochylias),
- ruins of the Roman Catholic church (1908).

== Sources ==
- (in Ukrainian) Бігус М., Дзядик Б., Максимівка // Ternopil Encyclopedic Dictionary: in 4 v. / editorial board: H. Yavorskyi and other, Ternopil: "Zbruch", 2005, V. 2: К—О, S. 434. — ISBN 966-528-199-2.
- "Maksymówka 3.) M., przysiołek". Geographical Dictionary of the Kingdom of Poland (in Polish). 5. Warszawa: Kasa im. Józefa Mianowskiego. 1884. p. 937.
