= Arcadia Olenska-Petryshyn =

Ukrainian art critic (1934–1996)

- Аркадія Оленська-Петришин
- Born: Arcadia Ivanivna Olenska; June 19, 1934; Roznoshyntsi, Second Polish Republic (now Ukraine)
- Died: May 6, 1996 (aged 61); North Brunswick, New Jersey
- Known for: Highly stylized paintings of Flora, esp. cactus

Arcadia Ivanivna Olenska-Petryshyn (Note: Ukrainian: Аркадія Іванівна Оленська-Петришин, romanized: Arkadiia Ivanivna Olenska-Petryshyn) (née Olenska; June 19, 1934 – May 6, 1996) was an American artist, art critic and editor.

She was born in Roznoshyntsi, Second Polish Republic (now Ukraine). She left Poland with her family in 1944, moving to Augsburg in Germany. Five years later, they moved to the United States, settling in New York City. She was educated at Washington Irving High School and went on to earn a MA at Hunter College, where she studied with Robert Motherwell and William Baziotes. Later, she pursued post-graduate work at the University of Chicago. She married Volodymyr Petryshyn, a mathematics professor, in 1956.

She worked mainly with lithographs and oil paint. She exhibited her work at shows in New York City, Toronto, Brussels, Shenyang, Kyiv and Lviv. She was an active member of the "New York Group", an association of Ukrainian artists and writers, and helped create the Association of Young Ukrainian Artists.

Olenska-Petryshyn was art editor for Suchasnist', a Ukrainian literary and cultural journal.

In 1996, she was killed by her husband at home in North Brunswick, New Jersey Her husband was later found not guilty by reason of insanity.

Her work is held in various public and private collections, including the Ukrainian Museum in New York City. and the New Jersey State Museum.
