= Chernykhivtsi =

Rural locality in Ternopil Oblast, Ukraine

Chernykhivtsi Чернихівці
- Location in Ternopil Oblast
- Coordinates: 49°37′56″N 25°43′38″E
- Country: Ukraine
- Oblast: Ternopil Oblast
- Raion: Ternopil Raion
- Hromada: Zbarazh urban hromada
- Time zone: UTC+2 (EET)
  - Summer (DST): UTC+3 (EEST)
- Postal code: 47370

Chernykhivtsi (Ukrainian: Чернихівці) is a village in the Zbarazh urban hromada of the Ternopil Raion of Ternopil Oblast in Ukraine.

== History ==
The first written mention of the village was in 1340.

After the liquidation of the Zbarazh Raion on 19 July 2020, the village became part of the Ternopil Raion.

== Religion ==
- Holy Trinity church (1778, brick).

== Notable residents ==
- William Dzus (1895–1964), American engineer

In the village visited Ivan Franko (1895, 1897) and Lviv Metropolitan of the UGCC Andrei Sheptytskyi (1906).

== Sources ==
- (in Ukrainian) Уніят В., Чернихівці // Ternopil Encyclopedic Dictionary: in 4 v. / editorial board: H. Yavorskyi and other, Ternopil: "Zbruch", 2008, V. 3: П—Я, S. 593–594. — ISBN 978-966-528-279-2.
- "Czernichowce". Geographical Dictionary of the Kingdom of Poland (in Polish). 1. Warszawa: Kasa im. Józefa Mianowskiego. 1880. p. 822—823.
