= Kolodne, Ternopil Oblast =

Rural locality in Ternopil Oblast, Ukraine

Kolodne Колодне
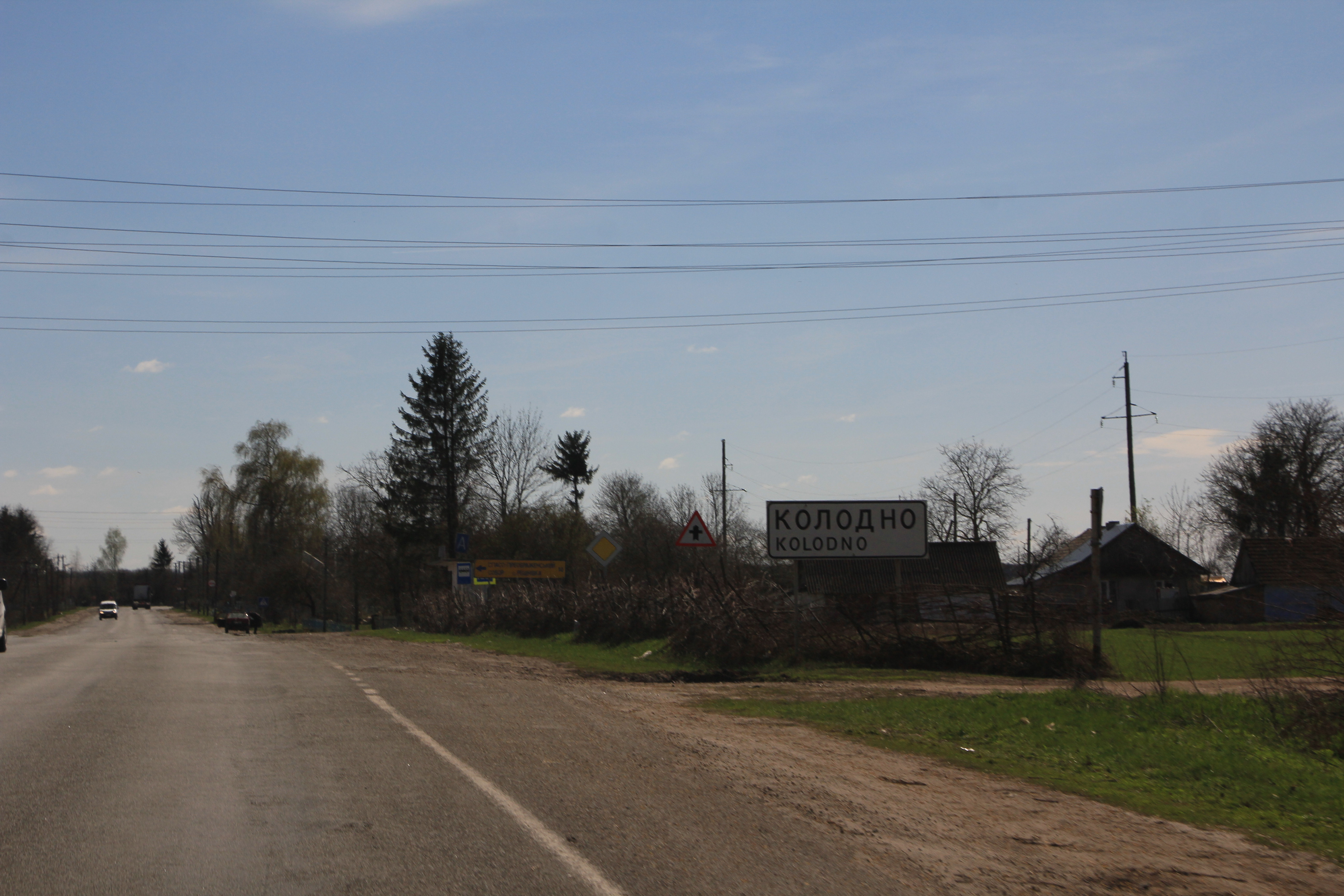

- Location in Ternopil Oblast
- Coordinates: 49°45′19″N 25°43′18″E
- Country: Ukraine
- Oblast: Ternopil Oblast
- Raion: Ternopil Raion
- Hromada: Zbarazh Hromada
- Time zone: UTC+2 (EET)
  - Summer (DST): UTC+3 (EEST)
- Postal code: 47335

Kolodne (Ukrainian: Колодне) is a village in Zbarazh urban hromada, Ternopil Raion, Ternopil Oblast, Ukraine.

== History ==
The first written mention of the settlement is in 1465.

== Religion ==
- Church of St. Nicholas (1575, brick; an architectural monument of national importance);
- Two churches of St. Michael the Archangel (18th century, wooden; rebuilt in 1858; icon of St. Barbara, who, according to legend, saved the village from the plague in 1895), new (2013);
- Roman Catholic church

== Monuments ==
The village has an ancient castle and palace.

== Sources ==
- (in Ukrainian) Уніят, В., Колодне // Ternopil Oblast. History of cities and villages: in 3 v. / Ternopil: "Terno-graph", 2014, V. 2: Г—Л, S. 271—273. — ISBN 978-966-457-228-3.
- "Kołodno, wś, pow. krzemieniecki". Geographical Dictionary of the Kingdom of Poland (in Polish). 4. Warszawa: Kasa im. Józefa Mianowskiego. 1883. p. 279.
