= Oprilivtsi =

Rural locality in Ternopil Oblast, Ukraine

Oprilivtsi Опрілівці
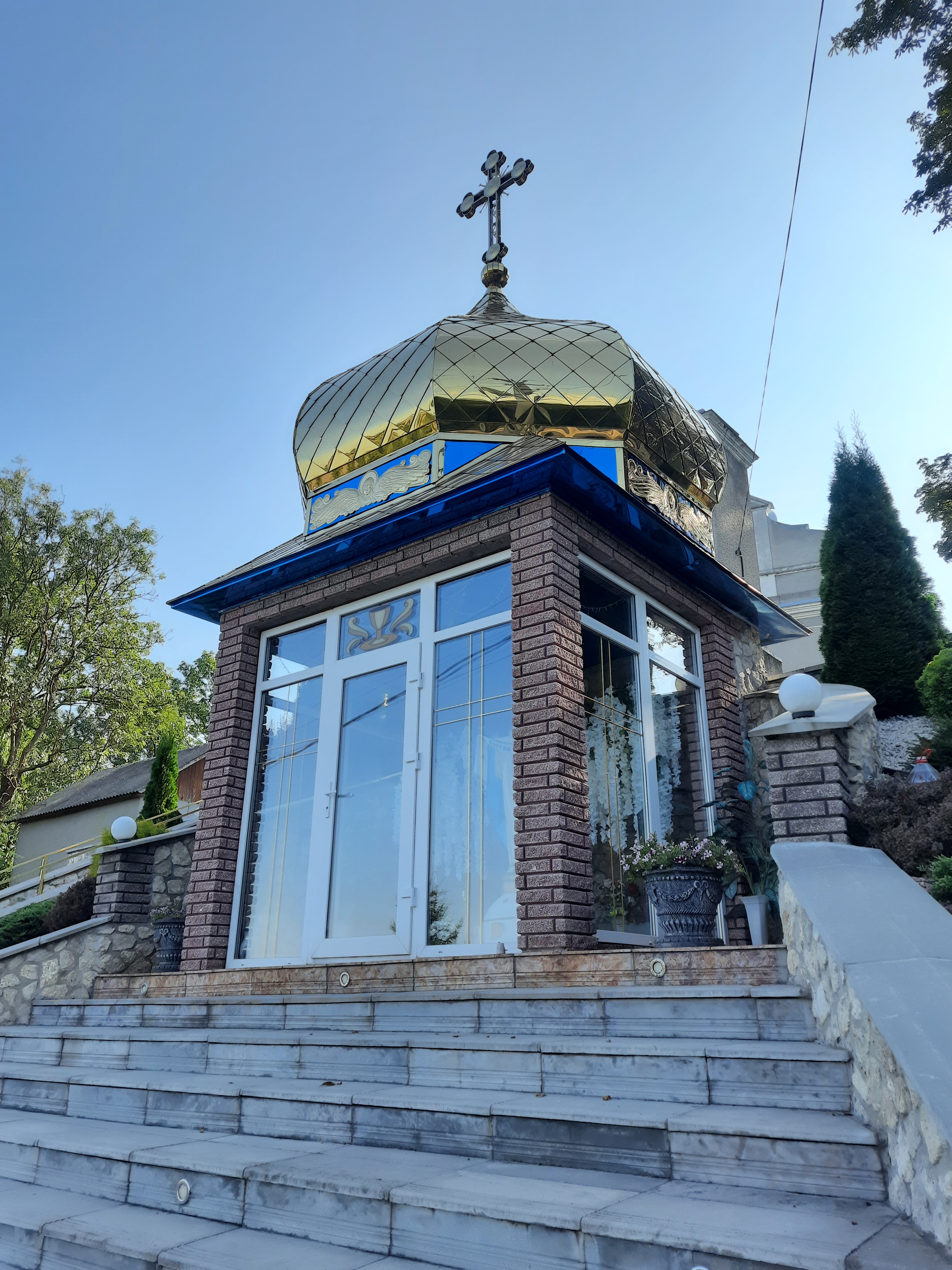
- Chapel of oprilivtsi

- Location in Ternopil Oblast
- Coordinates: 49°42′5″N 25°39′40″E
- Country: Ukraine
- Oblast: Ternopil Oblast
- Raion: Ternopil Raion
- Hromada: Zbarazh urban hromada
- Time zone: UTC+2 (EET)
  - Summer (DST): UTC+3 (EEST)
- Postal code: 47343

Oprilivtsi (Ukrainian: Опрілівці) is a village in the Zbarazh urban hromada of the Ternopil Raion of Ternopil Oblast in Ukraine.

== History ==
The first written mention of the village was in 1463.

After the liquidation of the Zbarazh Raion on 19 July 2020, the village became part of the Ternopil Raion.

== Religion ==
- Church of the Intercession (1751, brick, rebuilt from a Roman Catholic church in 1989).

== Sources ==
- (in Ukrainian) Хаварівський Б., Чайковський В., Опрілівці // Ternopil Encyclopedic Dictionary: in 4 v. / editorial board: H. Yavorskyi and other, Ternopil: "Zbruch", 2005, V. 2: К—О, S. 679. — ISBN 966-528-199-2.
- "Opryłowce". Geographical Dictionary of the Kingdom of Poland (in Polish). 7. Warszawa: Kasa im. Józefa Mianowskiego. 1886. p. 568.
