= William Dzus =

American inventor

William Dzus (born Volodymyr Dzhus (Ukrainian: Володимир Джус; 5 January 1895, Chernykhivtsi, Kingdom of Galicia and Lodomeria, currently Ukraine – 19 June 1964, New York City, United States) was an American engineer from Eastern Galicia, and the inventor of the Dzus fastener, also known as the quarter-turn fastener. He was also one of the founders of the Ukrainian Institute of America, a cultural foundation, for which he purchased the Harry F. Sinclair House (its current home).

== Life ==
Dzus was born 1895 in the country of Ukraine to a family of wealthy Ukrainian farmers in the village of Chernykhivtsi in the Austro-Hungarian Empire. In his late teens he moved over from his home country to New York, where he quickly established himself as an innovative thinker, developing the first form of the quick‐acting fastener and founding the Dzus Fastener Company in 1934. The fastener was originally designed to fit aircraft – subsequently being used in heavy machinery, automobiles and license plates.

In 1948 Dzus founded the Ukrainian Institute of America, a charitable and cultural organization, of which he was also president for a number of years. The building at which the institute is based was acquired in 1955. Furthermore, Dzus was also a member of the American Institute of Aeronautics and Astronautics, the Society of Automotive Engineers, and the National Association of Manufacturers.

== Death ==
William Dzus died, aged 69, from a stroke and other health complications at the Good Samaritan Hospital on 19 June 1964. A Requiem Mass was held in his memory at the Holy Family Ukrainian Catholic Church.

== Quote ==
"The obstacles will become diminutive when you view them from the pinnacle of love for the work to which you have set your hand."

== See also ==
Ukrainian Americans in New York City
