= Shyly, Ternopil Oblast =

Rural locality in Ternopil Oblast, Ukraine

Shyly Шили
- Location in Ternopil Oblast
- Coordinates: 49°45′59″N 25°51′2″E
- Country: Ukraine
- Oblast: Ternopil Oblast
- Raion: Ternopil Raion
- Hromada: Zbarazh urban hromada
- Time zone: UTC+2 (EET)
  - Summer (DST): UTC+3 (EEST)
- Postal code: 47431

Shyly (Ukrainian: Шили) is a village in the Zbarazh urban hromada of the Ternopil Raion of Ternopil Oblast in Ukraine.

== History ==
The village has been known from the 16th century.

After the liquidation of the Lanivtsi Raion on 19 July 2020, the village became part of the Ternopil Raion.

== Religion ==
- Church of the Nativity of the Blessed Virgin Mary (1873, brick).

== Sources ==
- (in Ukrainian) Мельничук Б., Шили // Ternopil Encyclopedic Dictionary: in 4 v. / editorial board: H. Yavorskyi and other, Ternopil: "Zbruch", 2008, V. 3: П—Я, S. 637. — ISBN 978-966-528-279-2.
- "Szyły, pow. krzemieniecki". Geographical Dictionary of the Kingdom of Poland (in Polish). 12. Warszawa: Kasa im. Józefa Mianowskiego. 1892. p. 111.
