= Volodymyr Petryshyn =

Ukrainian mathematician (1929–2020)

Walter Volodymyr Petryshyn (Vladimir Petryshin) (22 January 1929 – 21 March 2020) was a Ukrainian mathematician. On 6 May 1996, Petryshyn killed his wife, Ukrainian-American painter Arcadia Olenska-Petryshyn. He suffered from a severe depression, which caused the tragedy and was found not guilty by reason of insanity. In 2012, he became a fellow of the American Mathematical Society.
