= Dzus fastener =

Fastener to secure skin panels on aircraft

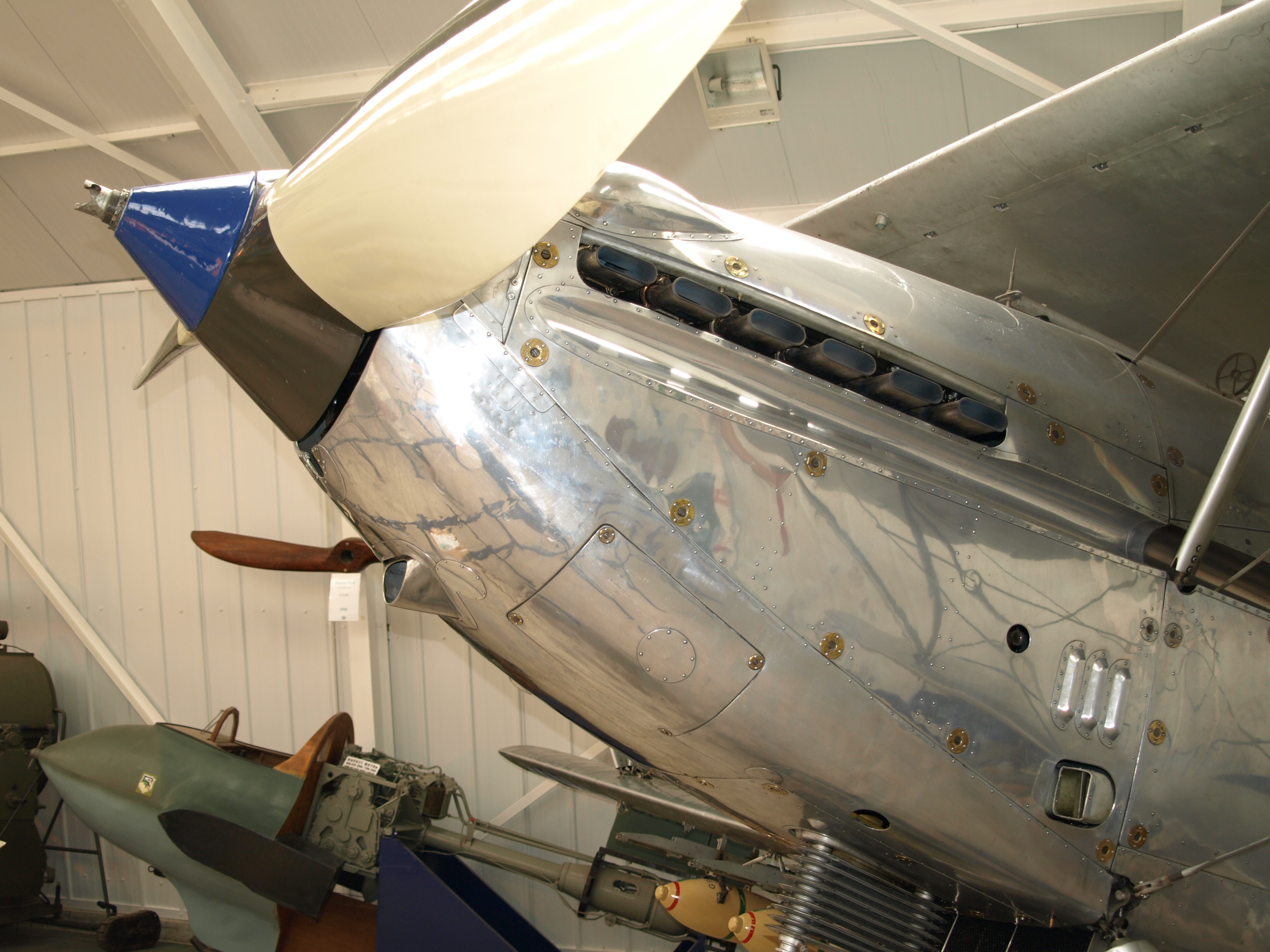
The Dzus fasteners (gold coloured circular objects) fastening the cowling panels of the 1930s Hawker Hind

The Dzus fastener, also known as a turnlock fastener or quick-action panel fastener, is a type of proprietary quarter-turn spiral cam lock fastener often used to secure skin panels on aircraft and other high-performance vehicles. It is named after its inventor William Dzus (/zuːs/). The Dzus brand is owned by Southco and fastener Dzus are produced by Southco.

== History ==
The fastener was invented and patented by William Dzus, an American engineer of Ukrainian descent, in the early 1930s.

== Operation ==
=== Functionality ===
U.S. Patent 1955740, illustrating the original Dzus fastener holding an aircraft cowling (10) to a fuselage (11)

To fasten the cowling (designated as part 10 in the patent) to the fuselage (11), the button's shank (13) is inserted into a hole (25) on the fuselage. A screwdriver is then used to turn the button (12) via a slot (21) in its head (14). As the button rotates, the spiral slots (16) on the shank act as cams, pulling a spring (22) into position. The projections (17) on the slots resist reverse rotation, preventing the fastener from loosening due to vibration. Optionally, felt or rubber strips (26) can be placed between the cowling and the fuselage to minimize noise.

=== Unfastening ===
To unfasten the cowling (10) from the fuselage (11) turn the button (12) one-quarter of a turn. This will disengage the button (12) from the spring (22). The holes (18) are large-enough to allow the spring (22) to clear the projection (17) either while engaging the button (12) or disengaging it. The end of the shank (13) that has the slots (16) must be well-rounded so spring (22) can easily enter its slots (16).

=== Components ===
The removable part of the Dzus fastener consists of a button (12) with a head (14) that includes a slot (21) for turning. A groove (19) on the button ensures it remains attached to the cowling (10) when unfastened. The stationary part includes the spring (22), which is riveted (24) to the fuselage. The spring has arched coils (23) between the rivets, providing the necessary tension for secure fastening.

The shank (13) of the button contains spiral bayonet slots (16) that engage the spring. These slots include holes (18) that hold the spring in place once fastened, with projections (17) preventing accidental unfastening. The button’s head (14) is pressed against the cowling, keeping it firmly in place.

=== Improvements ===
Over time, several improvements have been made to the Dzus fastener design. Some versions include a housing or bucket around the female part to reduce water ingress. Others have been optimized for ease of use, such as incorporating self-centering screwdrivers. Cost-saving measures, like securing the spring directly to the female hole without rivets, have also been introduced. Additionally, the button is often die-cast in modern versions to reduce manufacturing costs compared to earlier machined versions.

== Uses ==
Dzus fasteners are also used to secure plates, doors, and panels that require frequent removal for inspection and servicing. These fasteners are notable in that they are of an "over-centre" design, requiring positive sustained torque to unfasten. Thus, any minor disturbance to the fastener (e.g., vibration) will tend to correct itself rather than proceed to further loosening as it would in threaded fasteners.

Turnlock fasteners are available in several different styles and are usually referred to by the manufacturer's trade name. Some of the most common are DZUS, Camloc, and Airloc.
