= Zbarazh urban hromada =

Urban hromada in Ternopil Oblast, Ukraine

Zbarazh urban hromada Збаразька міська громада
- hromada
- Location within Ternopil Oblast Location within Ukraine
- Coordinates: 49°40′17″N 25°46′15″E
- Country: Ukraine
- Oblast: Ternopil Oblast
- Raion: Ternopil Raion
- Administrative center: Zbarazh

Government
  - Hromada head: Roman Polikrovskyi

Area
  - Total: 599.6 km^{2} (231.5 sq mi)

Population (2022)
  - Total: 38,415
- City: 1
- Villages: 53
- Website: www.zbarazh-rada.gov.ua

Zbarazh urban territorial hromada (Ukrainian: Збаразька територіальна громада, romanized: Zbarazka miska terytorialna hromada) is a hromada in Ukraine, in Ternopil Raion of Ternopil Oblast. The administrative center is the city of Zbarazh. Its population is 38,415 (2022 estimate)

== Settlements ==
The hromada consists of 1 city (Zbarazh) and 53 villages:

- Bazaryntsi
- Boliazuby
- Verniaky
- Vytkivtsi
- Vyshchi Lubianky
- Hlynchuky
- Hnizdychne
- Hory-Stryiovetski
- Hrytsivtsi
- Dibrova
- Dobrovody
- Dobromirka
- Zaluzhzhia
- Zarubyntsi
- Zaruddia
- Zarudechko
- Ivanchany
- Ivashkivtsi
- Kapustynskyi Lis
- Kapustyntsi
- Karnachivka
- Kydantsi
- Kobyllia
- Kolodne
- Krasnosiltsi
- Kretivtsi
- Lisky
- Maksymivka
- Mala Berezovytsia
- Malyi Hlybochok
- Musorivtsi
- Nyzhchi Lubianky
- Novyi Rohovets
- Novyky
- Olyshkivtsi
- Oprilivtsi
- Reshnivka
- Roznoshyntsi
- Syniava
- Syniahivka
- Staryi Zbarazh
- Stryivka
- Tarasivka
- Travneve
- Khomy
- Chahari-Zbarazki
- Chernykhivtsi
- Chesnivskyi Rakovets
- Chornyi Lis
- Chumali
- Shyly (1)
- Shyly (2)
- Shymkivtsi
