= Zbarazh Raion =

Former subdivision of Ternopil Oblast, Ukraine

Zbarazh Raion Збаразький район
- Raion
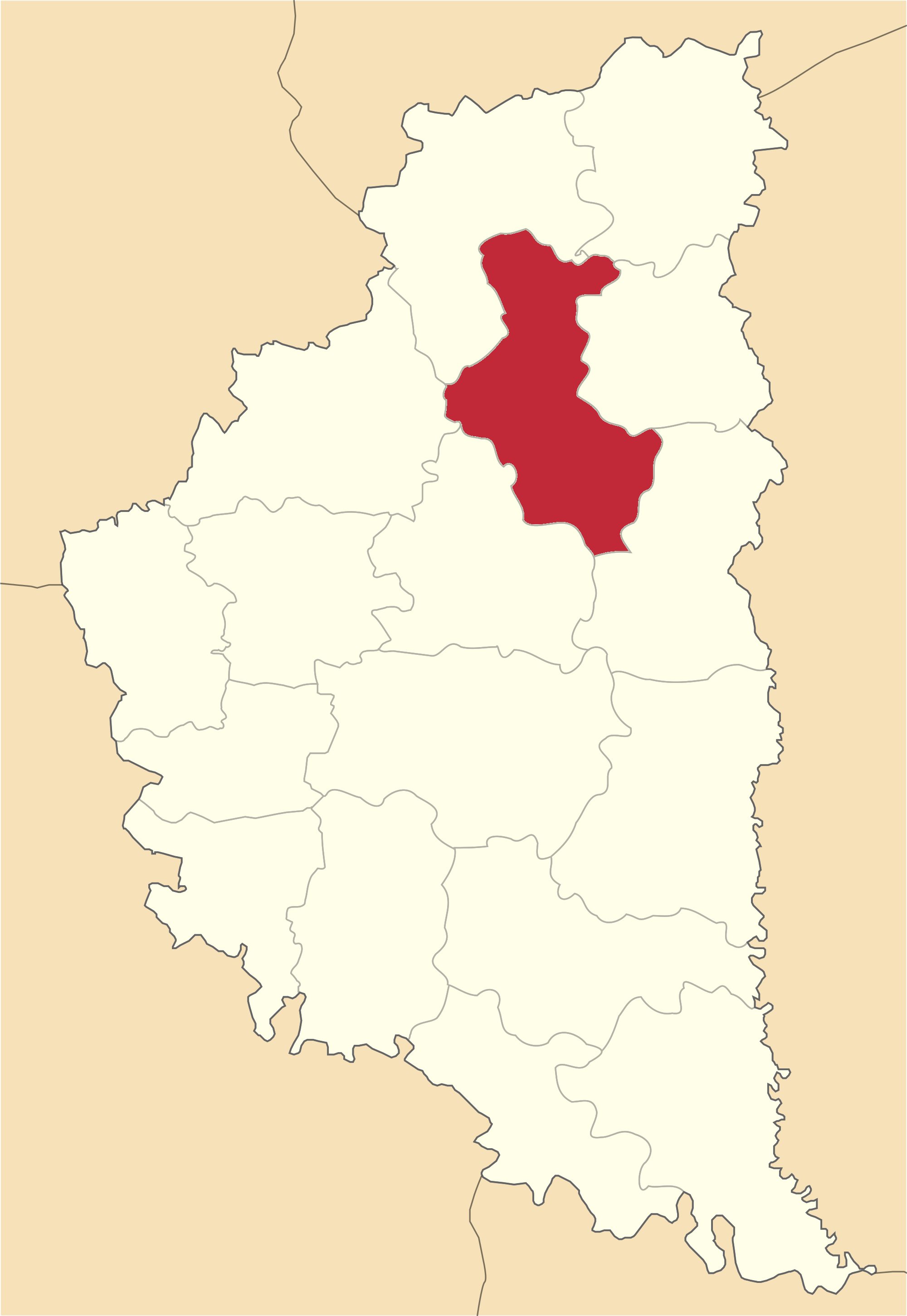
- Coordinates: 49°44′N 25°47′E
- Country: Ukraine
- Oblast: Ternopil Oblast
- Established: 1939
- Disestablished: 18 July 2020
- Admin. center: Zbarazh
- Subdivisions: List: — city councils; — settlement councils; — rural councils; Number of localities: — cities; — urban-type settlements; 74 — villages; — rural settlements

Area
  - Total: 863 km^{2} (333 sq mi)

Population (2020)
  - Total: 55,844
  - Density: 64.7/km^{2} (168/sq mi)
- Time zone: UTC+02:00 (EET)
  - Summer (DST): UTC+03:00 (EEST)
- Area code: 380-3550

Zbarazh Raion (Ukrainian: Збаразький район) was a raion (district) of Ternopil Oblast in western Ukraine. The administrative center was the city of Zbarazh. The raion was abolished on 18 July 2020 as part of the administrative reform of Ukraine, which reduced the number of raions of Ternopil Oblast to three. The area of Zbarazh Raion was split between Kremenets Raion and Ternopil Raion. The last estimate of the raion population was 55,844 (2020 est.).

== Subdivisions ==
At the time of disestablishment, the raion consisted of two hromadas:

- Vyshnivets settlement hromada with the administration in the urban-type settlement of Vyshnivets, transferred to Kremenets Raion;
- Zbarazh urban hromada with the administration in Zbarazh, transferred to Ternopil Raion.

== Demographics ==
The population in 2001 was 60,349, a decline of 5% from 63,600 in 1989. The population density was 70 per square kilometre (180/sq mi).

Average life expectancy is 71. The urban population was 28%.

== Geography ==
Zbarazh Raion had an area of 863 square kilometres (333 sq mi)

== Neighboring raions ==
Zboriv (west), Kremenetsi (north), Shumsk (northeast), Lanivtsi (east), Pidvolochysk (southeast), Ternopil (southwest)
