= Staryi Zbarazh Castle =

Lost defensive structure in Staryi Zbarazh, Ternopil Oblast, Ukraine

- Staryi Zbarazh, Ternopil Raion, Ternopil Oblast
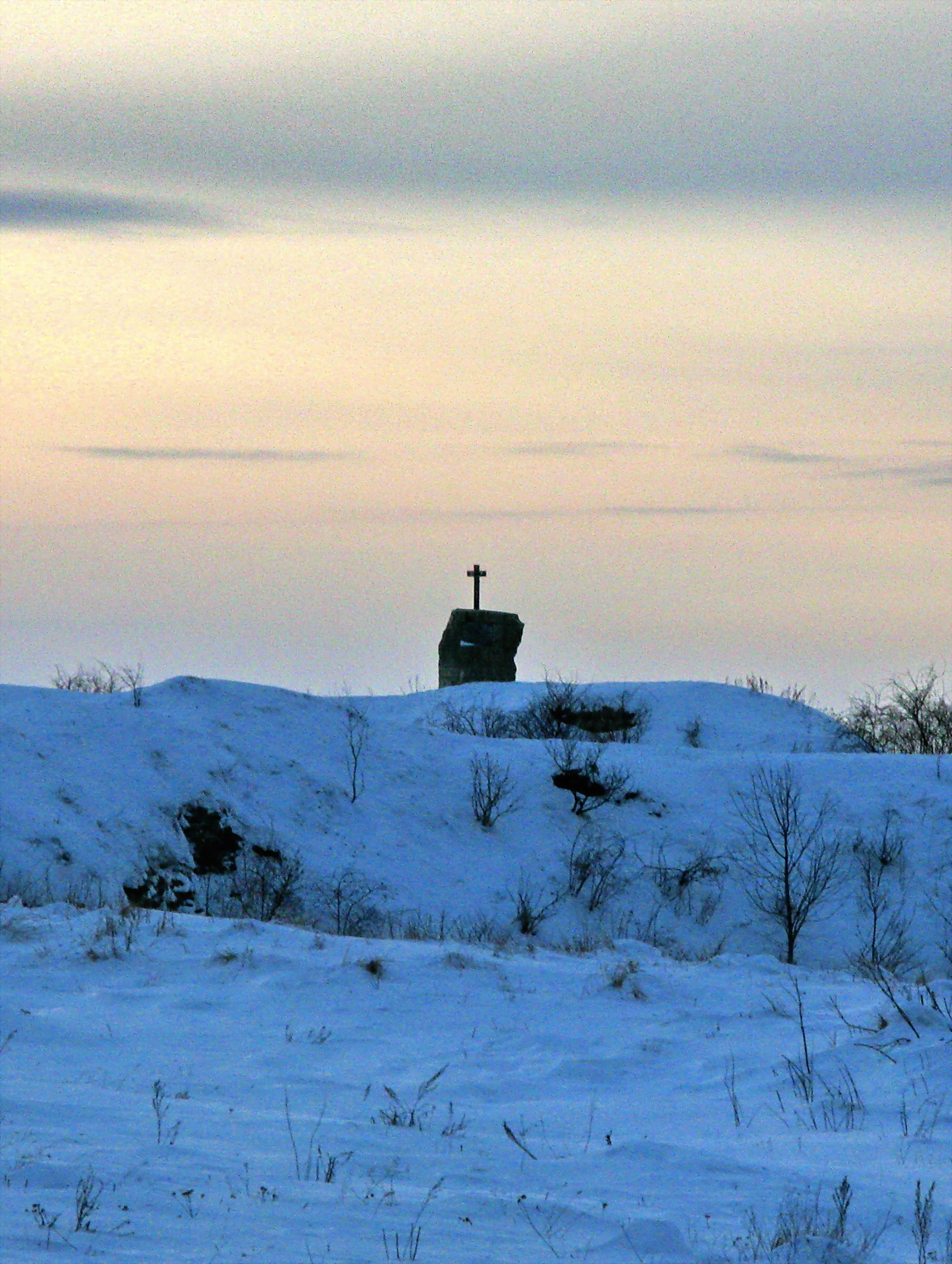
- The ruins of the castle

Site information
- Owner: Ukraine
- Condition: ruined

Location
- Coordinates: 49°39′31″N 25°44′56″E

Immovable Monument of National Significance of Ukraine
- Official name: Замок (Castle)
- Type: Architecture, Archaeology
- Reference no.: 190011

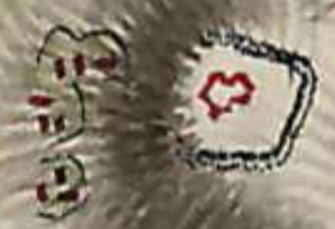
Staryi Zbarazh Castle on the map by Friedrich von Mieg, 18th century

The Staryi Zbarazh Castle (Ukrainian: Старозбаразька фортеця, romanized: Starozbaraz'ka fortetsia) was a castle built in the 15th century by Kniaz Kaributas on a high rock. It is an architectural monument of national significance of Ukraine.

== History ==
During a Tatar invasion in 1474, Kniaz Vasyl Nesvizkyi defended himself in the castle and fell there and the castle was burned. After this invasion, the Zbaraskis rebuilt the stronghold and stayed there until 1589, when a Tatar invasion broke the defense led by Janusz Zbaraski and it was again destroyed. After that it was not rebuilt again. On the initiative of Kniaz Krzysztof Zbaraski, at the beginning of the 17th century, construction of a new castle in Zbarazh began, 3 km from the old one.

== Architecture ==
In the 15th century, it was a wooden defensive structure surrounded by a wall, which included an entrance gate.

== Sources ==
- "Zbaraż Stary". Geographical Dictionary of the Kingdom of Poland (in Polish). 14. Warszawa: Kasa im. Józefa Mianowskiego. 1895. p. 512.
