= Zbarazh Castle =

Castle in Zbarazh, Ukraine

- Zbarazh, Ternopil Oblast
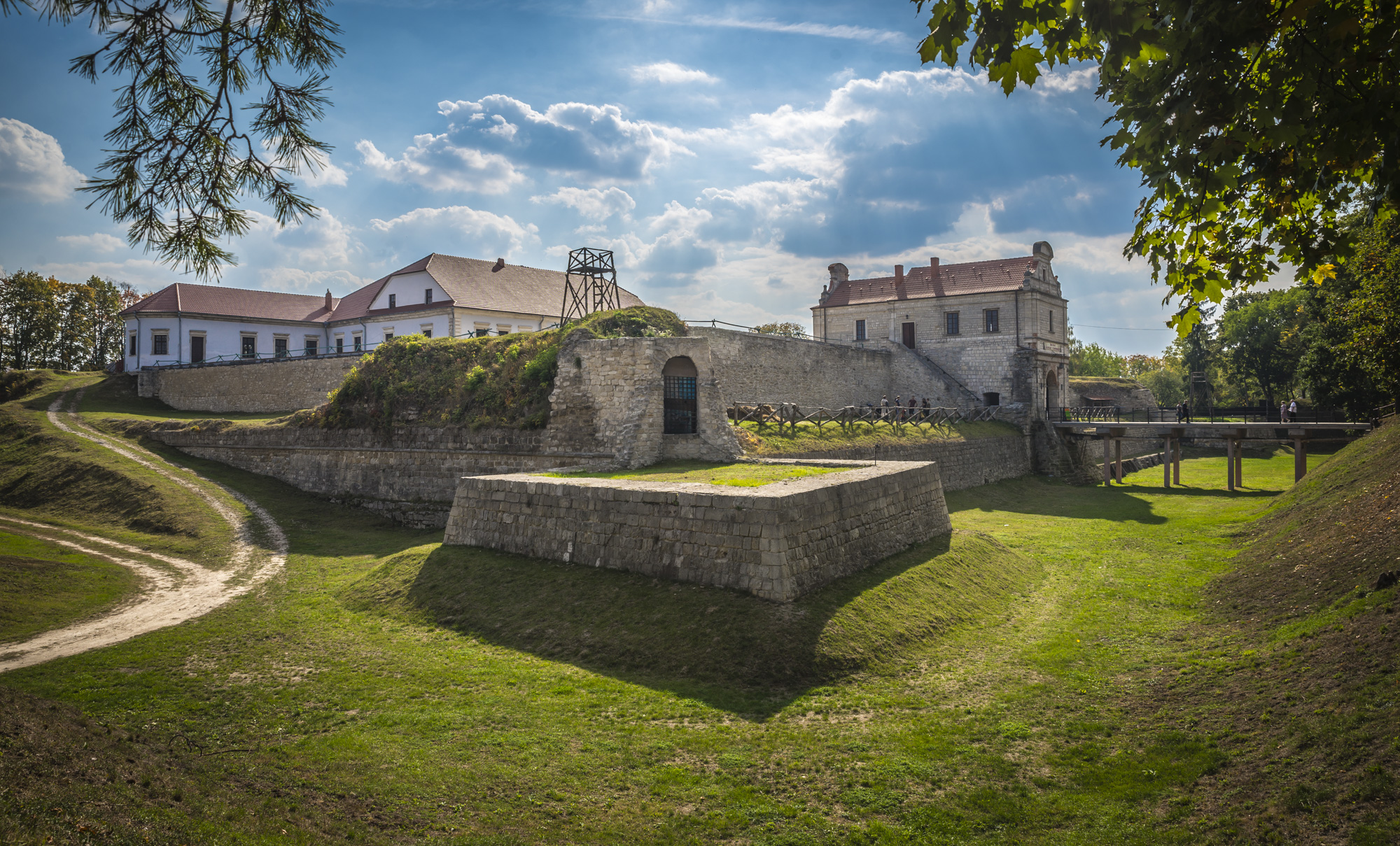

Site information
- Type: Renaissance, early Baroque
- Condition: continuous cosmetic renovations

Location
- Coordinates: 49°39′48″N 25°47′07″E

Site history
- Built: 1631
- Built by: Henryk van Peene
- Battles/wars: Siege of Zbarazh

Immovable Monument of National Significance of Ukraine
- Official name: Замок (Castle)
- Type: Architecture, History
- Reference no.: 190008

The Zbarazh Castle (Ukrainian: Збаразький замок, romanized: Zbarazkyi zamok; Polish: Zamek w Zbarażu) is a fortified defense stronghold in Zbarazh, built during the times of the Polish–Lithuanian Commonwealth. It dominates the crests of the Zamkova Hills of Ternopil Oblast in Western Ukraine next to the city's central plaza that was not in so distant past surrounded by marshland. The castle existence has been credited to last members of the Polish Zbaraski family; Krzysztof and Jerzy Zbaraski.

Evidence of the City of Zbarazh formation can be seen in the Ruthenian fortress dating back to 1211 that was positioned somewhat away from current castle. Today this is a village of Zbarazky District located in the immediate proximity of Zbarazh itself and called the village of Staryi Zbarazh. At that distant time the old castle and the province was ruled by Gediminids Landlords Zbarazky.

The castle is known for being the seat of the Ukrainian aristocratic Wiśniowiecki family and its prominent members, most notably Jeremi Wiśniowiecki.

== Early Zbarazh Castle ==
The Zbarazky landlords erected a primeval wooden fortress in the town which nowadays is called Staryi Zbarazh (Old Zbarazh), a quarter mile away from their own mansion. Soon after it was incinerated during a skirmish with the tatars. All the fortification's protectors, including Vasyl Nesvizky, the grandson of Theodore Kaributas, were killed on the burning battleground. Another castle was constructed in the same location using the same materials, and its end was enacted in the same deadly way. It was set on fire during a nomadic attack in the year of 1589 while Janusz Zbarski commanded the stronghold. Later in the beginning of the 17th century, his son decided to build a masonry structure in the new location receiving guidance from Western European architects.

The first blueprints were drafted by Vincenzo Scamozzi for Krzysztof Zbaraski, but the project did not gain approval: it would remain more a palace then a marshal bastion. Scamozzi had envision his creation at first and described it in the tractate named "The idea of universal architecture", which he later on partially embodied into stone in the city of Zbarazh. It appeared that this architect took "Utopia" of Thomas More too close to his heart. Therefore, the contender won a different project by Henryk van Peene, who was quite familiar with the landlords due to his previous work on Zbaraski's palace in Kraków.

== New Zbarazh Castle ==
An escarped bulwark emerged from the mounds of dirt up to 12 m (39 ft) high, and a terrace for the castle troopers was laid out of 23 m (75 ft) wide. A rectangular courtyard inside had been plotted. Behind the walls arched chambers were constructed, that nowadays house specimens of arms and wooden sculptures of Pinzel's students. An entrenchment around bulwark was very wide, in some parts it is as much as 40 m (131 ft). In the middle of the fortress, regarding rules of "palazzo in fortezza", was developed a palace in the architectural style of Renaissance with early Baroque elements.

First ruination of the new fortification was endeavored by cossacks in 1648. Polish sources reported their amount as much as 100,000 strong. But it would rather be an exaggeration. There was no business for such a ferocious army to siege a small castle. Nonetheless the landlords became determined increasing security of the military outpost. In the year of 1649 it was improved complying to a design of architect Dubois from Lorraine. During some period of time the stronghold was vacant, but later on its ownership was transferred to the Wiśniowiecki family. In 1675, it was overcome and burned by Turks, and soon afterwards followed a restoration by Dimitry Wiśniowiecki. That was exactly a moment when castle was turned into a palace, losing its strategic military designation. Nevertheless, it did not stop Russian soldiers plundering a building in the years of 1707 to 1734. Dmitry Wiśniowiecki having died in 1682, the architectural complex became a property of the Potocki family. These were Joseph and later on Stanislav, Mayor of Kyiv. Zbarazh remained under the control of the Potoki family until the middle of the 19th century.

The castle was taken by the Cossacks in 1649 and the Turks in 1675. The events of 1649 are dramatized by Henryk Sienkiewicz in his novel With Fire and Sword. Ivan Bohun was heavily wounded under the castle's walls. Ivan Mazepa and Peter I are known to have visited it in 1707.

=== Today's outlook ===
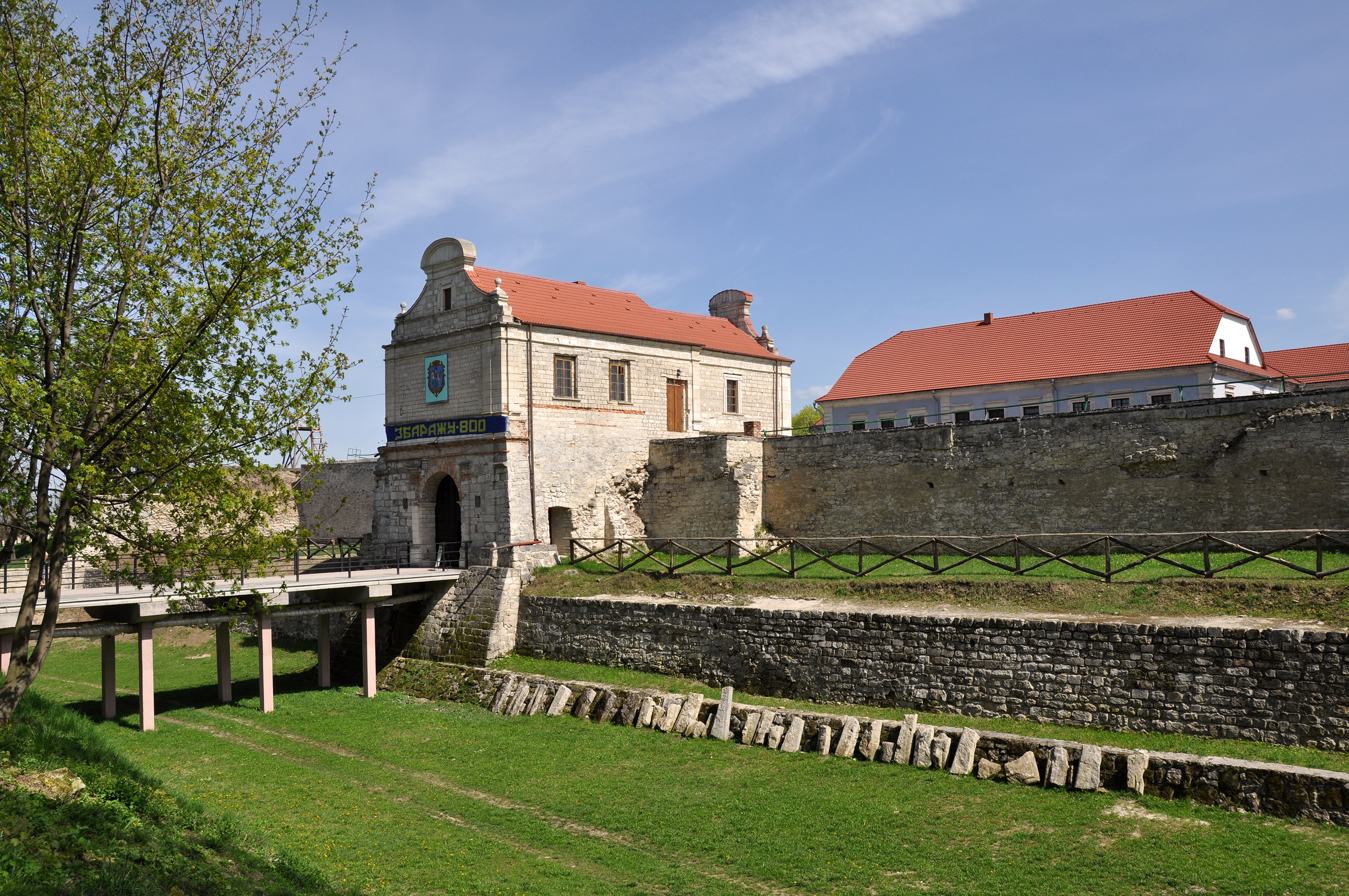
View on the castle in 2012

Ukrainian Independence having been announced, the castle was included into a registry of national historical architectural heritage in the year of 1994. The complex has a rectangular footprint, and surrounded on all sides by some marshland. This fortification demonstrated most advanced achievements of European marshal fortpost defense craft that included an escarped bulwarks, four bastions, and a moat encircling the building perimeter. Earlier, in the place of the palace, rectangular void was taken completely by the castles yard. The palace itself has two stories, being masonry built, with distinctive simplistic features of Renaissance era. The main entry way is emphasized by a balcony with a stone console. The outer corners of the palace are decorated with a field stone. Facades were risen in the Renaissance style as well. Gatehouse was aligned straightforward with the castle main entry. Pentagon bastions have been preserved partially. In everyone of them there are a tunnels connecting the castle yard and chambers.

=== An exposition ===
Exposition halls of the castle has been housing significant collection of arts and artifacts informing tourist and visitors of Zbarazh District history.

In 1980 the church, being itself an architectural heritage of the year 1755, accommodated District Museum of Natural History. It was founded as public entity by the Chief District Representative Department of Education Voityna Peter Denysovich. In the April 1982, it was transformed into government establishment and was serving to the needs of Ternopil Oblast's Museum of Natural History. First executive officer became Voityna Peter. In the year of 1989 Zbarazh District Museum of Natural History was headed by Matsipoora Annatoly Viktorovych. Due to a transferring the churches from the state control to respectful parishes supervision, the museum was moved into a gym that at that moment was situated in the castle

The art collection foundation at a time accumulated 4,277 items of primary fund and 1,401 items of auxiliary documents and artifacts. Major contributors to the cause were organization employees as Voityna P., Malevych A., Pohaudiy I., Matsipoora A., Mackarchuk N. The fund was enriched by materials of archeological excavations, ancient arms, paintings and sculpture artwork, numismatic collection, retro-clocks and furniture, old prints, pieces of worship, rugs and embroidery, items of everyday needs. In 1994, taking into account significant historical, architectural and creative importance of the castle legal act #78 on February 8, 1994, ruled inception of State Historic Cultural Preservation in the District of Zbarazh. For eight years of existence the fund became a part of architectural complex and filled in expositions in the halls of the museum. By a resolution of the Zbarazh board meeting on December 25, 2002, all the infrastructure and museum holding were given in service to the State Historic Architectural Preservation in the District of Zbarazh.

Using materials of art collection foundation were compiled primary expositions in the Zbarazh castle palace. These are archeological and ethnographic exhibits, as well as hall of sacred arts. State Historic Architectural Preservation expanded and enriched the museum tradition and complemented achievements of District Museum of Natural History. Every year exhibition was being enriched with items from state historic preservation fund, constant improving introductory tours is practiced, and control of excursions quality is being enacted as well. In accordance with the decree issued by the President on January 15, 2005 #35/2005 the Castles of Ternopil Oblast Reserve received the national status. Nowadays the 17th century Zbarazh Castle is a center of the "Castles of Ternopil Oblast" reserve and a notable landmark of the district and the whole region. Today's museum collection consists of 50,000 items of exposition. All of them unveil a history of Zbarazh countryside in various epochs and development periods.

Zbarazh Castle exposition consist of eight distinctive exhibitions. There is an overall list of them by the area of interest:

- Country archeological discoveries,
- Cucuteni-Trypillian culture,
- Ethnography,
- Arms,
- Wood carved sculptures of folk artist Volodymir Lipyichuk;
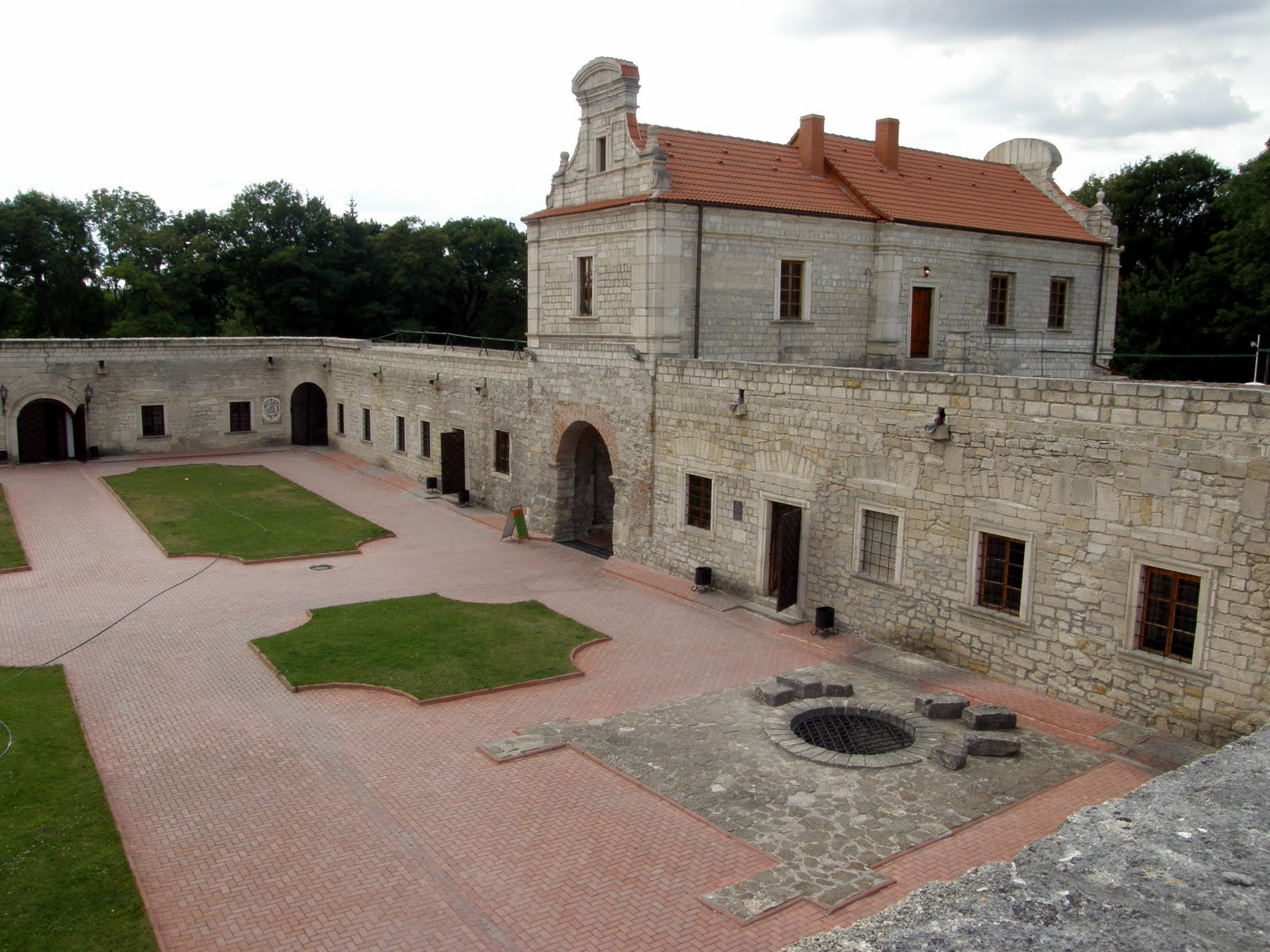
  Inside yard
- Deity sculptures;
- Retro furniture,
- Numismatics and notaphily,
- Sacred arts;
- Australia, New Zealand and Oceania chamber of Ivan Prashka, native of Zbarazh;
- Galicia and Volyn embroidery;
- Folk dress code;
- Ceramics of renowned master of Ukrainian arts Taras Levkiv, native of Zbarazh country;
- Hall of Cossacks’ Fame;
- A torture chamber cellars;
- Countryside crafts;
- Hall of current project exhibits;

Most ancient history of Zbarazh countryside presented in archeology. All the artifacts collected on this particular subject constituted a presentation of Paleolithic Era, Bronze and Iron Age, Chernyakhov Culture, epoch of early Slavs and Kyivan Rus’. Most notable artifacts are shown off originating in Trypillian Culture found near the village of Bodaky, Zbarazh District.

== Area of interest exhibits ==
Archeological excavations of Cucuteni-Trypillian culture near the village of Bodaky executed by National Preservation together with Saint Petersburg Institute Material Culture Russian Academy of Science, Ukrainian scientists and archeologists. Results of the research have yielded enough material to assemble a traveling exposition of Zbarazh countryside for presentations abroad. To the date of writing this note, it visited Varna, Orléans and Tours, Granada.

The Battle of Zbarazh entered into annals of Ukrainian history as one of the most patriotic stages of Revolutionary War for Independence. In the 1649 Zbarazh became an arena of combat straggle between Polish military and Cossack squadrons spearheaded by Bohdan Khmelnytsky. Precisely for this reason in the castle palace was created a Hall of Cossack's Fame. You would find there many busts of renowned warriors. Besides those sculptures, there is a portrait picture-show of Cossacks’ chieftains painted by Stanislav Kovalchuk Honored Artist of Ukraine .

Sacred Arts of Zbarazh countryside are represent three expositions. Castle palace three exposition halls house a collection of icons belonging to the period of 17th — first half of 20th century, that originate in Zbarazh District worship establishments. All the specimens of this assemblage were mindfully preserved by the employees. First category artist-instaurator of oil paintings Magynsky Vladimyr recovered most of them to the original state. Quite interesting is a property of parishes, that is situated in the halls of Sacred Arts securities. In particular, these are lithography and old prints, ritual and church service literature, ceremonial regalia of Christian worshiping.

Another feature deserving visitors’ attention is an exposition of Ivan Prasko's personal belongings; archbishop Ukrainian Greek-Catholic Church of Australia, Oceania and New Zealand; born in the City of Zbarazh, he was a minister during 1950–1994 period of time; died in 2001, but his individual items were returned to his homeland with father Michael Bedry's help and were saved in the castle repositories.

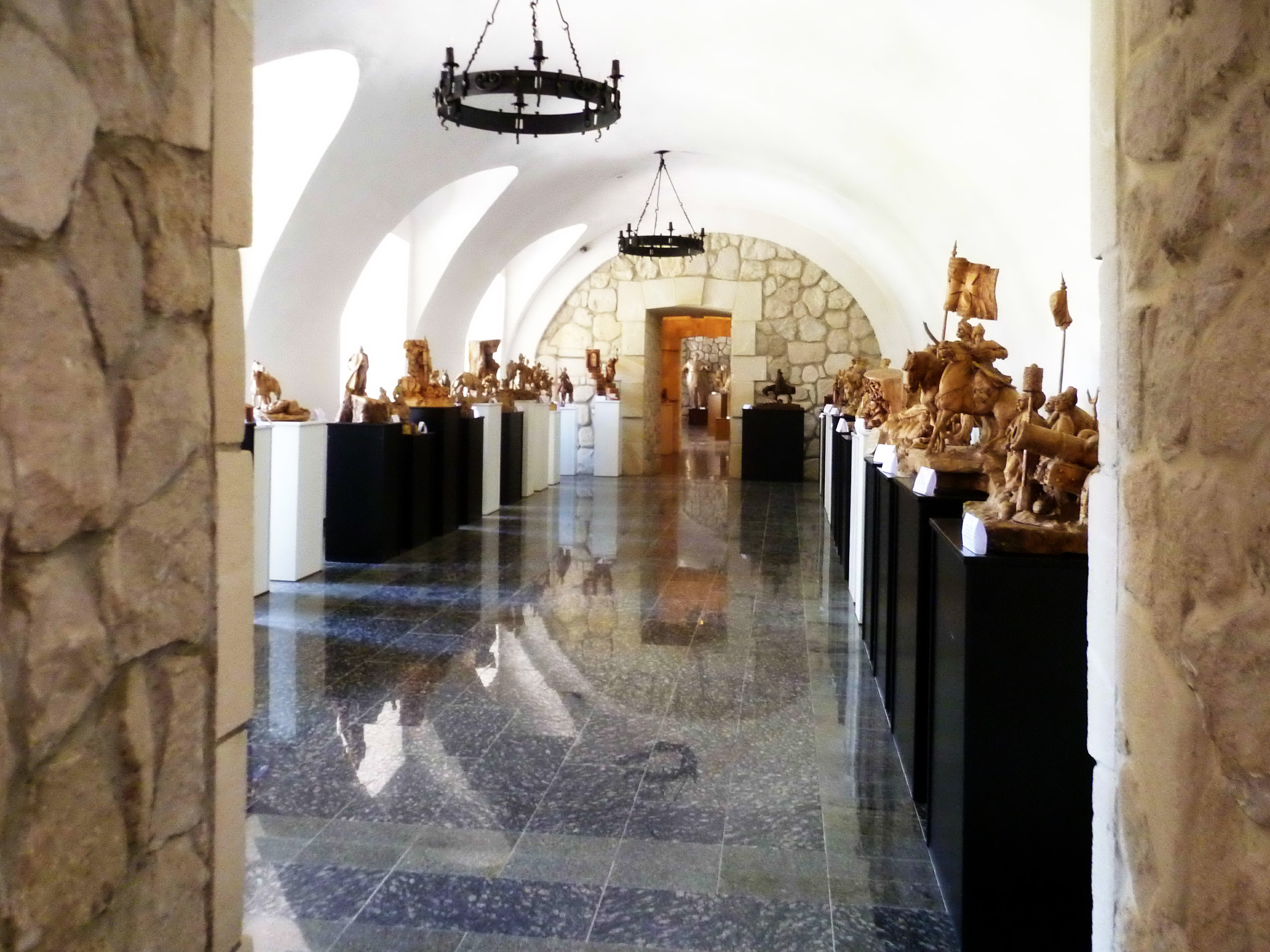
Hall of wooden sculptures.

In the separate exposition hall has been shown off sacred arts sculptures created by both Pensel's students as well as talented artist Antony Osinsky in the middle of 18th century. Their work material was a wood; polychrome technique was taken advantage of, as well as metal leaf layering of gold and silver applied. At one point of time these sculptures decorated Saint Antony's temple, but now they have become a museum collection cynosure of the castle palace. The icons and sacred sculptures collection, that were chosen out of State Historic Preservation fund, notably represented Zbarazh Castle out on a show of "Saved Relics" at Saint Sophia Cathedral in Kyiv transpired during April–May 2000.

Ethnography and a way of live in Zbarazh countryside represented by three palace show halls. A rare collection of Galych and Volyn embroidery have been situated there. Runners and tablecloths fabricated in different techniques on homemade and factory canvases using geometrical, floral, and zoological ornamentations. Alongside in the exhibition halls there are specimens of sacred art embroidery and gender specific folk dress code of Zbarazh District in history.

An exhibition on traditional rural crafts and their development displays household items from the late 19th and early 20th centuries. These include items made from homespun canvas, patterned loom-woven rugs, earthenware, wooden goods, and wickerwork of straw, osier and bast. A notable feature of Zbarazh Castle is the sculpture collection of Ukrainian Honored Artist Volodymyr V. Lipyichuk. It comprises more than forty of his works carved from lime wood. Some pieces depict a single subject, while others are grouped in pairs or threes under a common name or quotation. Lipyichuk's work seeks to portray characters from the well-known writings of Taras Shevchenko, Ivan Franko and Lesya Ukrainka. The work of Taras Levkiv, an Honored Artist and native of the village of Mala Berezovytsia in Zbarazh District, also attracts interest among visitors.

Separate focus of attention require collection of arms that being housed in two castle exposition halls. It was assembled out of specimens from Stone Age era, Iron Age, epoch of early and late Middle Ages, as well as period of First World War.

=== Torture chamber ===
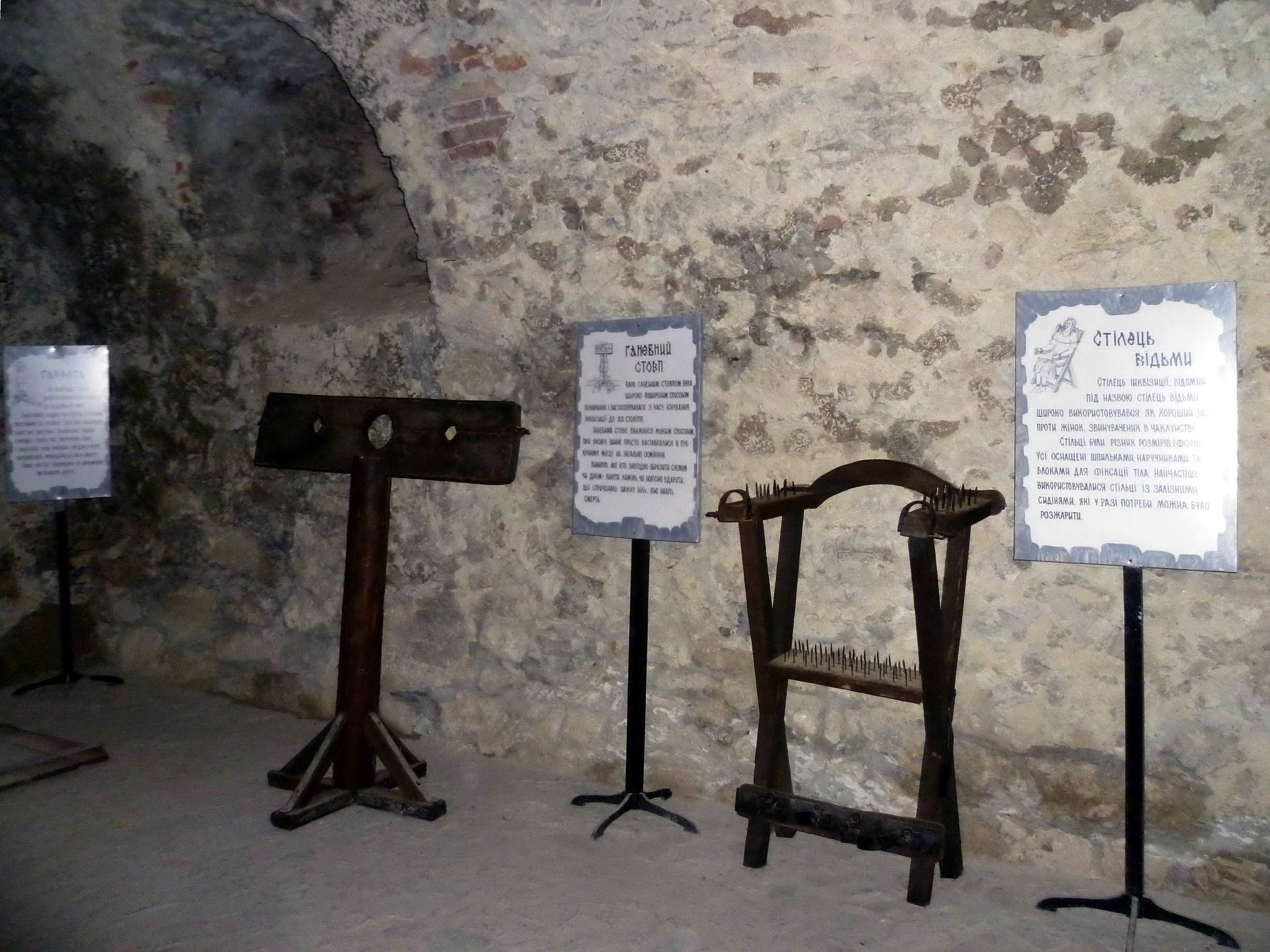
Ancient instruments of torture

There is a historical chamber of torture opened in Zbarazh Castle recently. In the cellars of the fortress next to the dungeon walls now has been installed ancient devices that used to inflict suffering. All the instrument have been manufactured using original blueprints. The charts were looked for in old archives. All the equipment is in working conditions.

The subject is an instrument of torture. It was engaged mostly in the period of Inquisition, that had been widely practiced on the territory of modern Spain, Italy, and Germany, and latter on with the spreading of Catholicism in Ukraine as well. There was a decision made to display the equipment in the cellars of Zbarazh Castle. Between the items of exposition there is a chair of witch. There is only three hundreds years passed by since last time a woman sat in it for suspicion in practicing an witchcraft.

As of this moment in the chamber of torture there are up to ten devil's mechanisms, but the exposition has been promised to be enriched.

== Gallery ==
Castle views

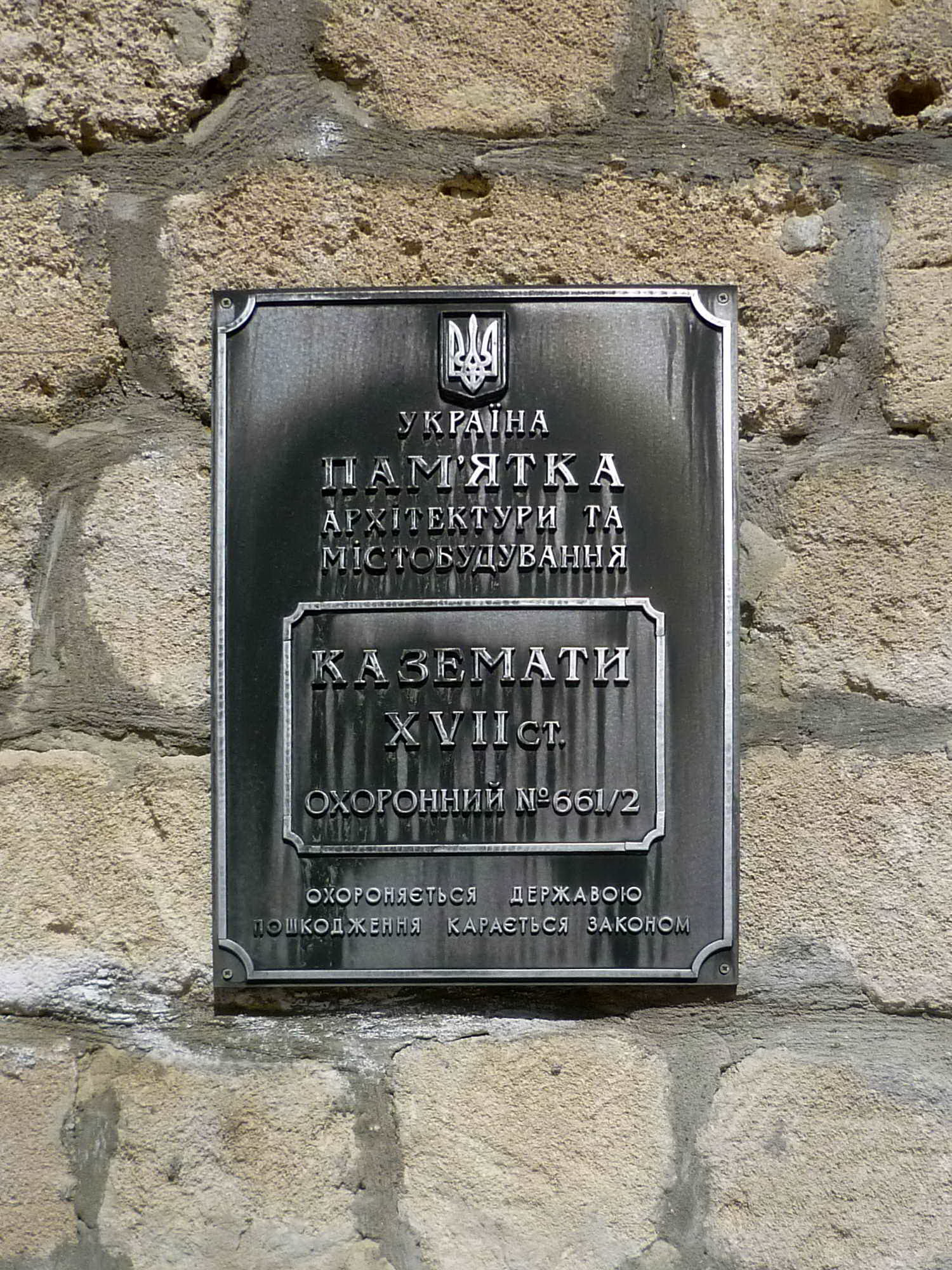
Castle barracks board

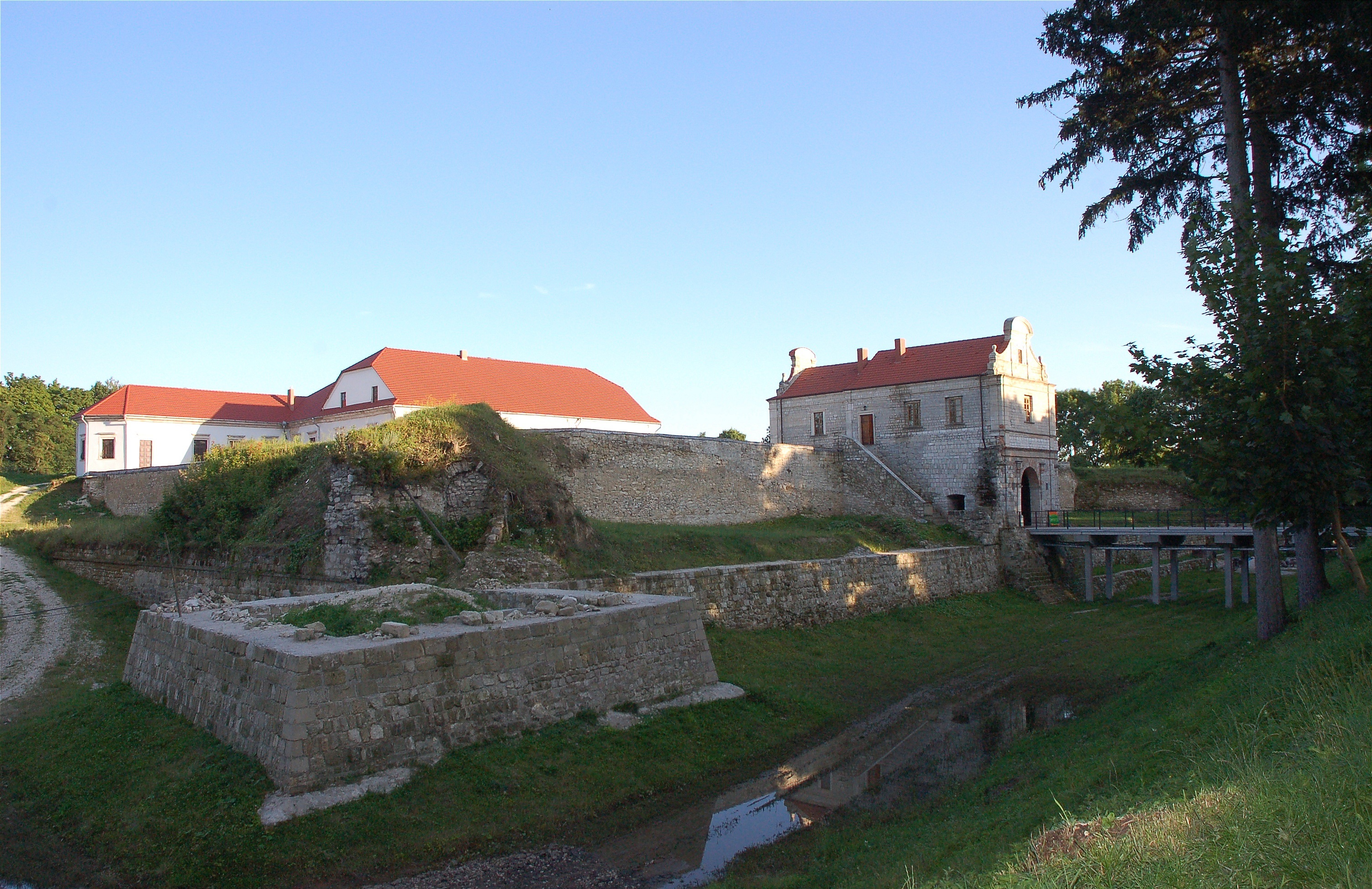
The bastion and the bulwark

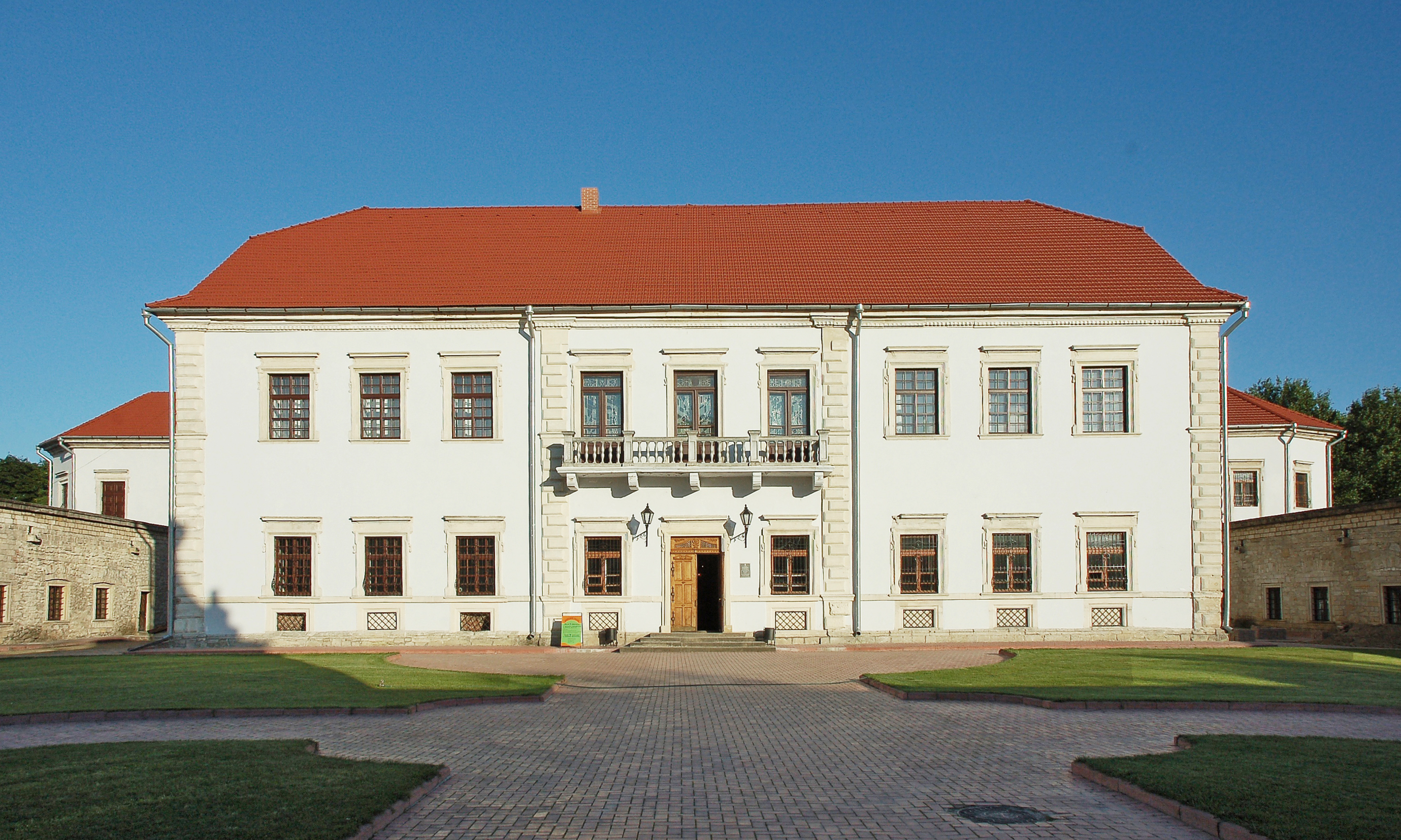
Main building

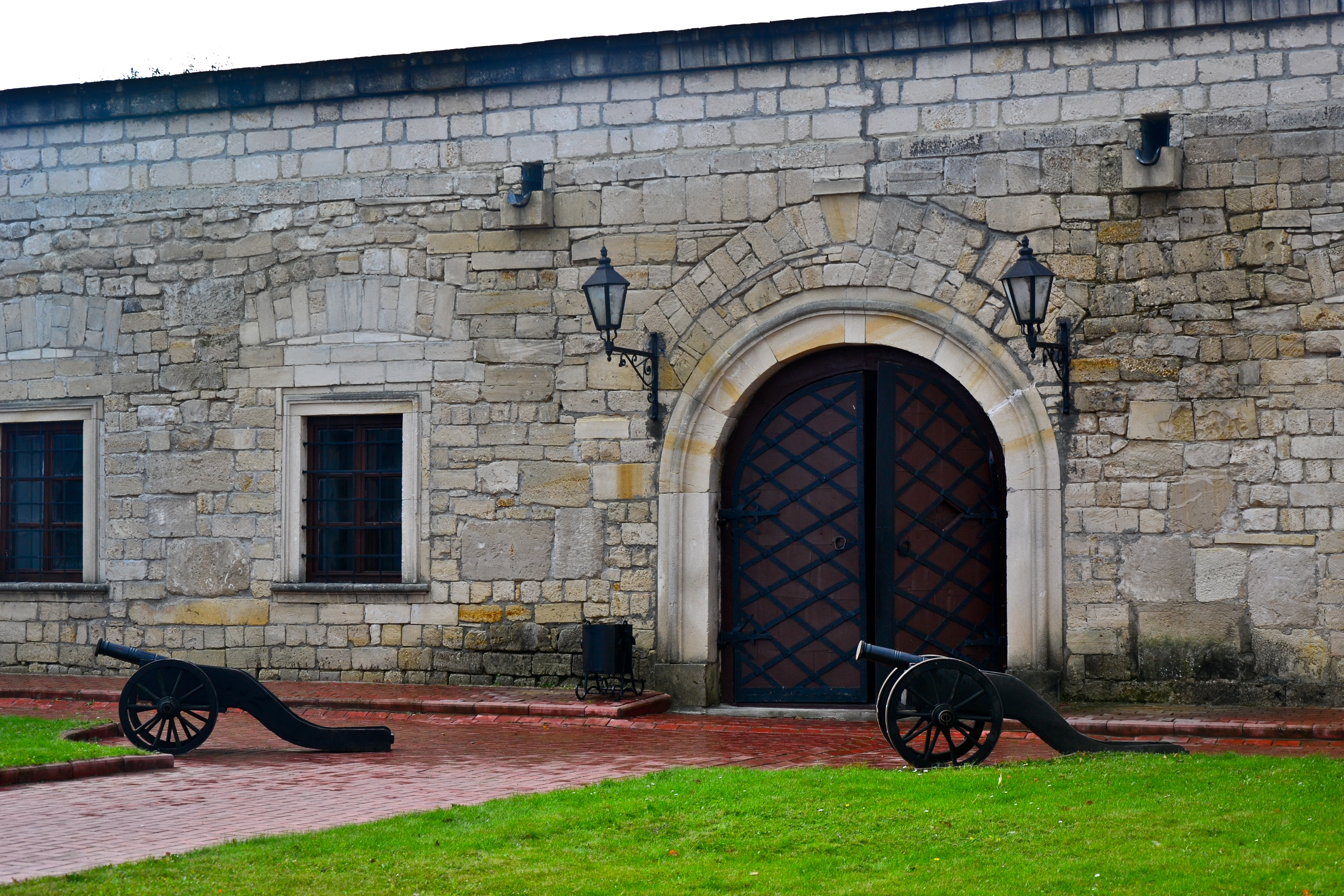
The barracks

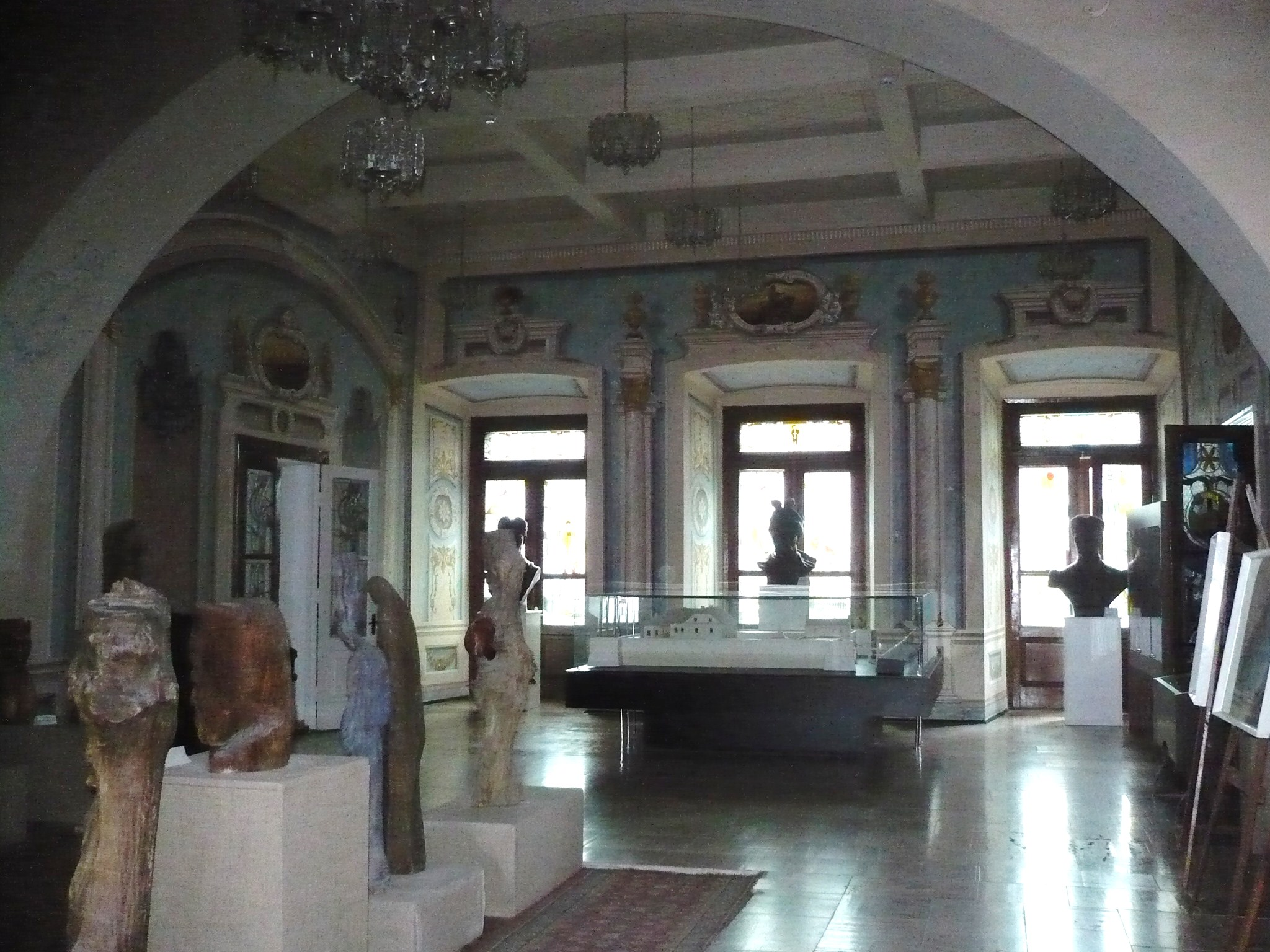
Sculpture works in the main building

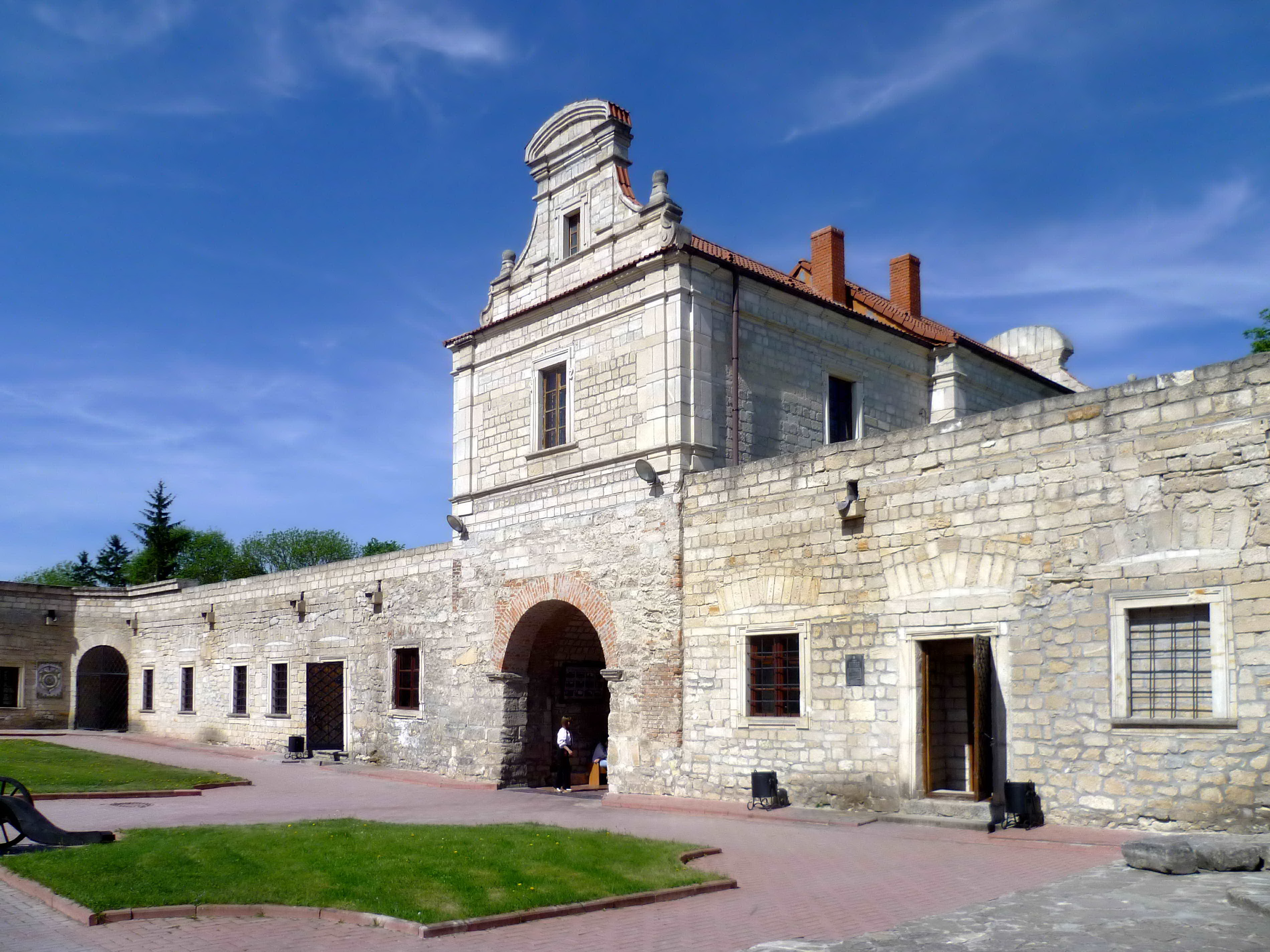
The gatehouse on the inner yard

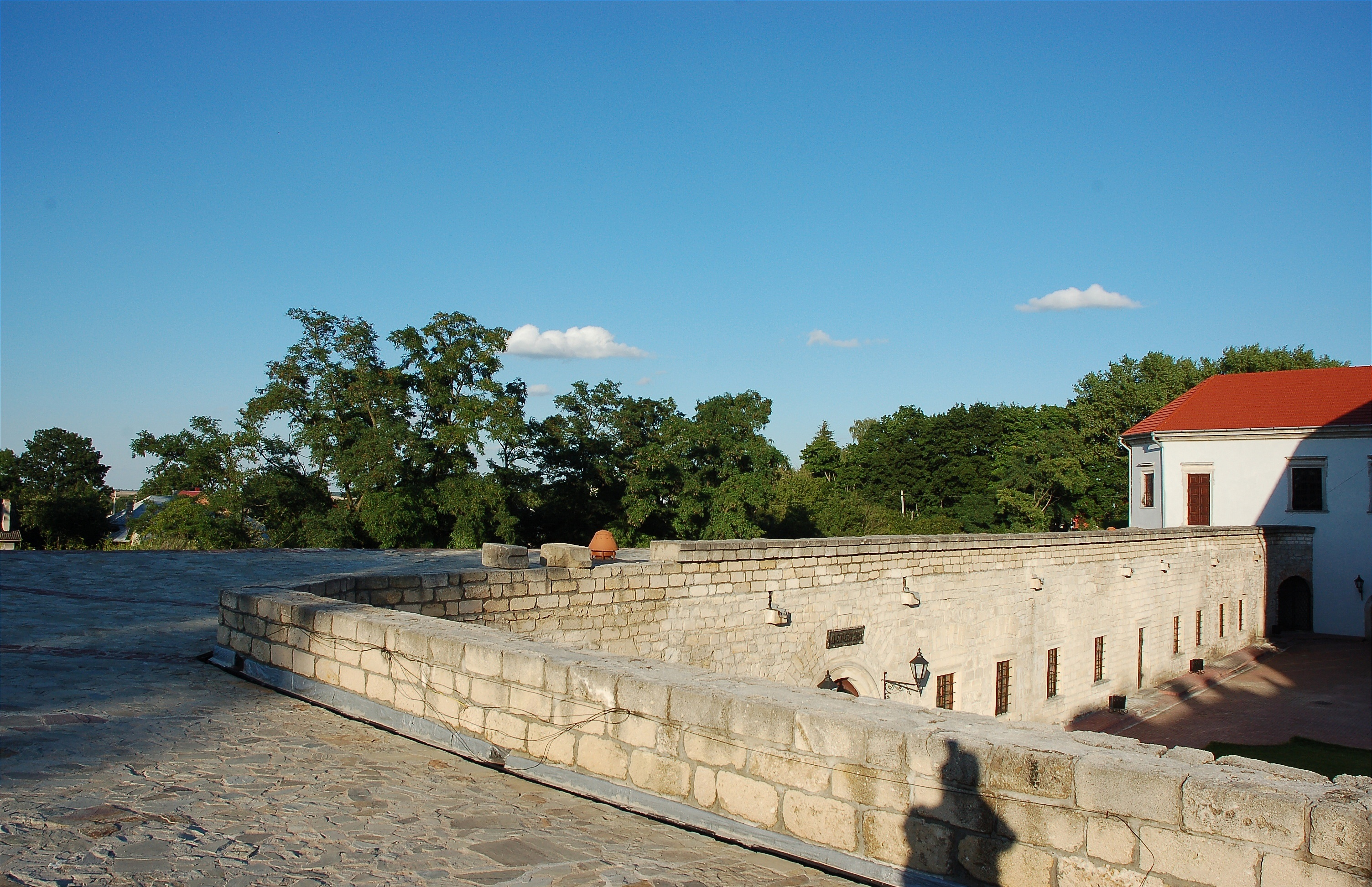
The terrace

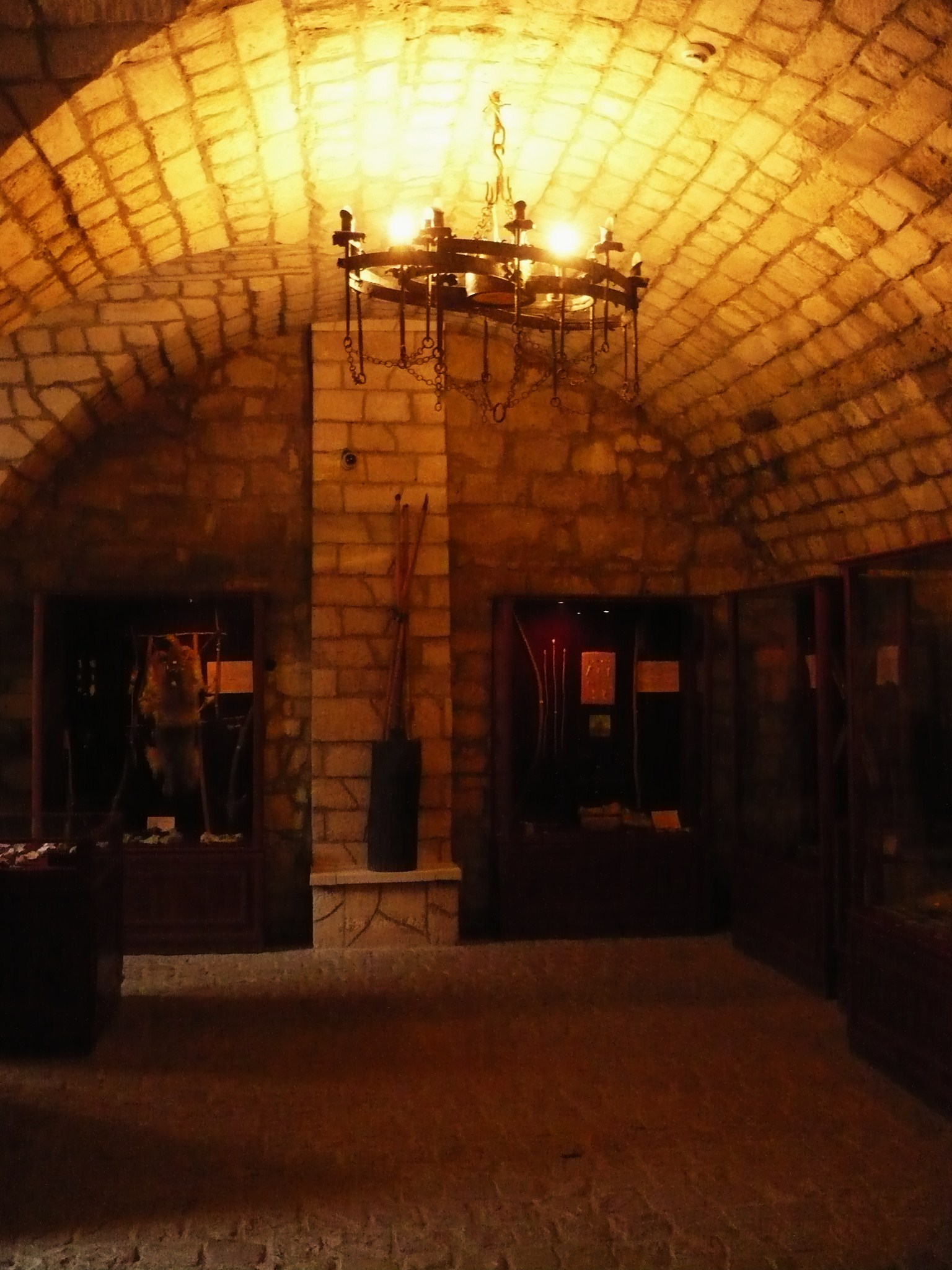
The exhibit of ancient armor and weapon

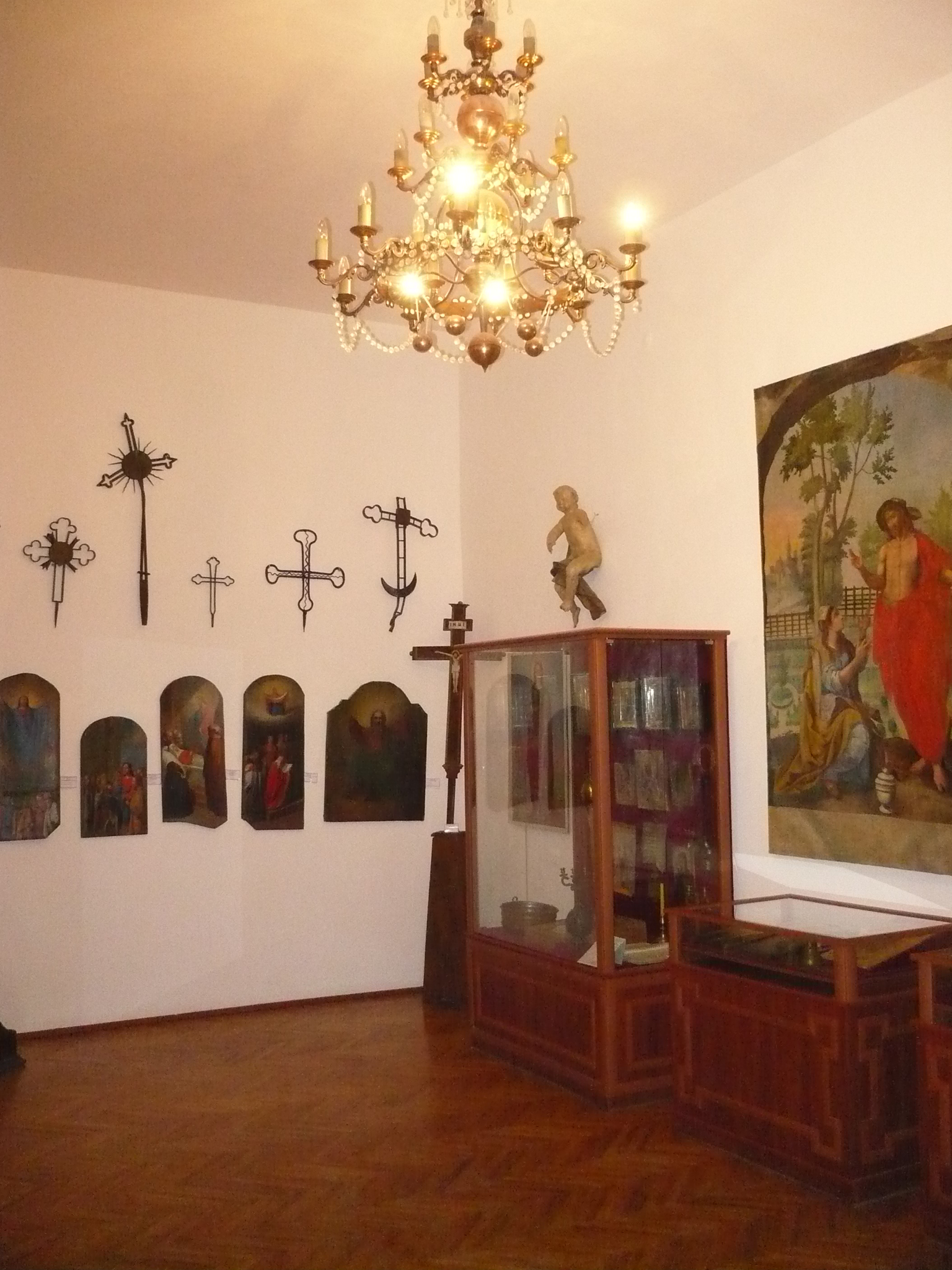
Sacred Arts Museum

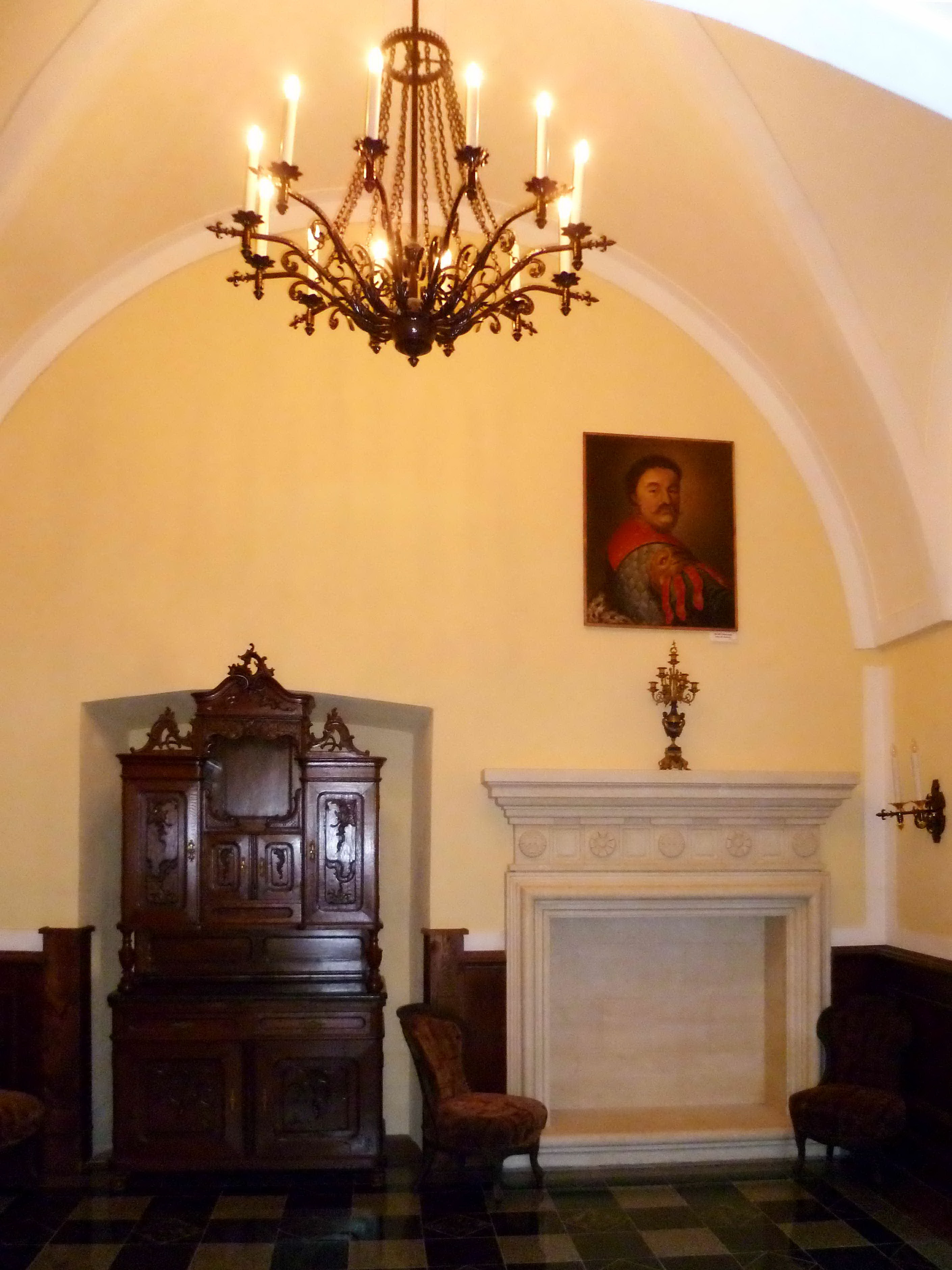
Interior room with the hetman portrait painting

== See also ==
- Siege of Zbarazh
