= Zbarazh =

City in Ternopil Oblast, Ukraine

Zbarazh Збараж
- City
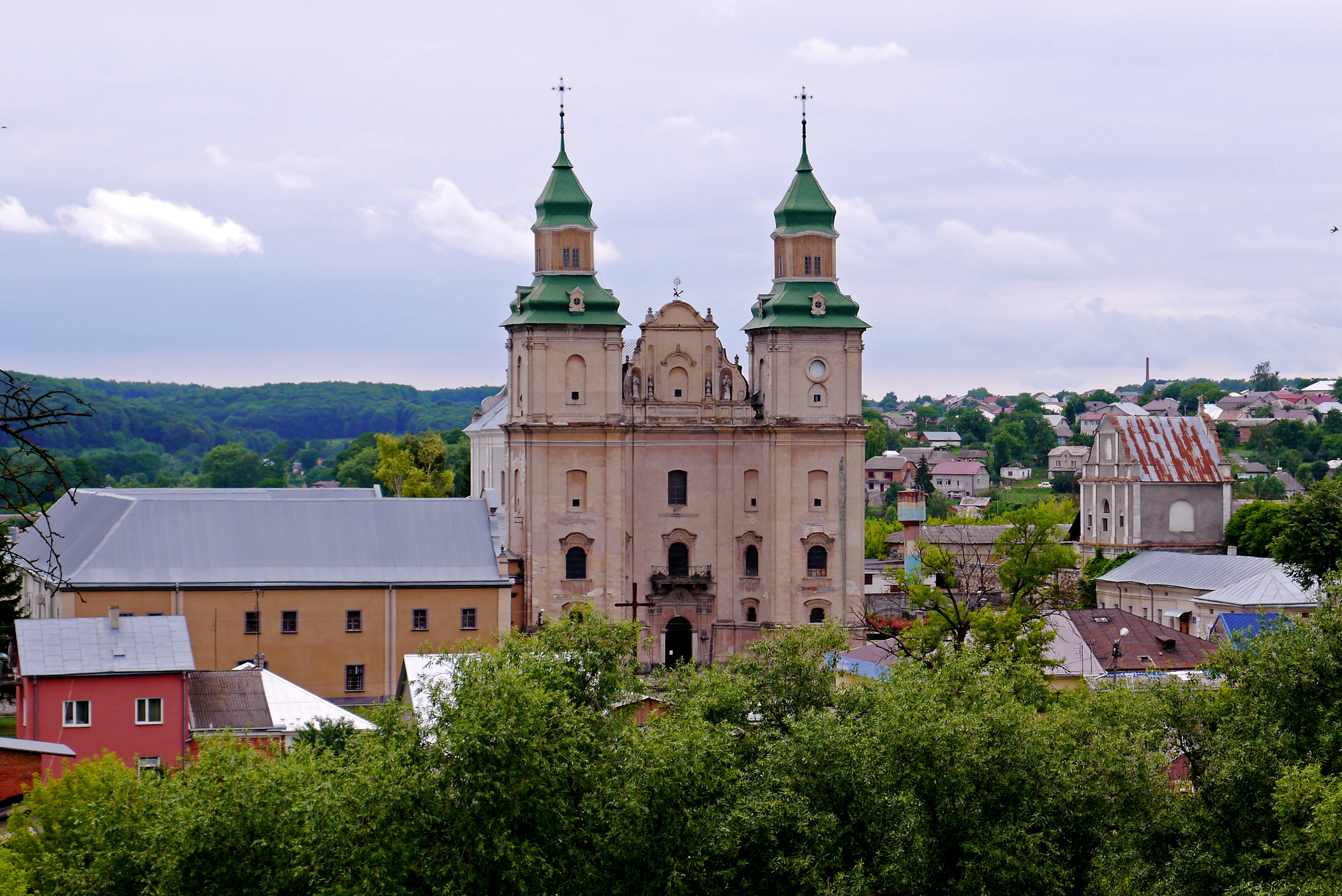
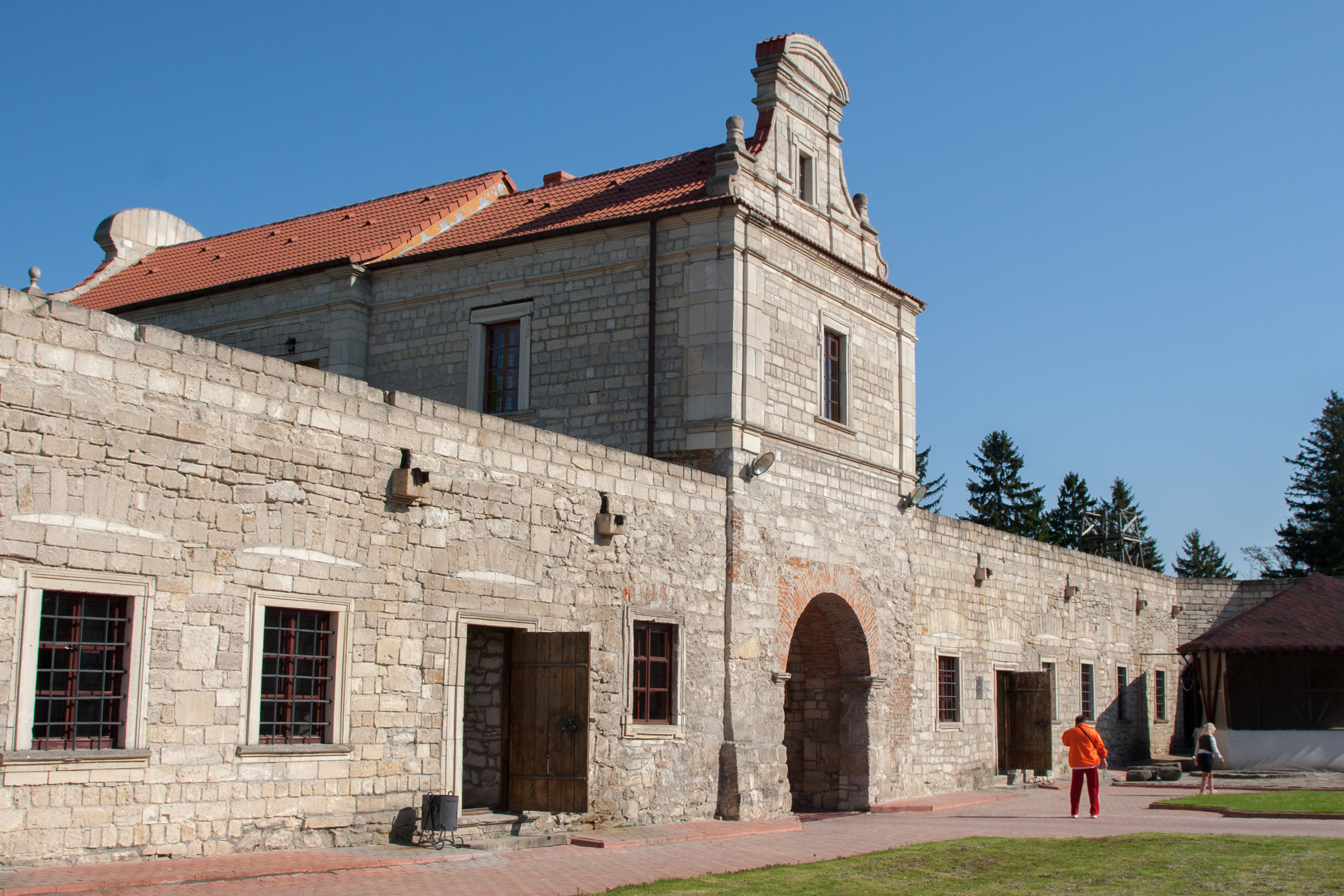
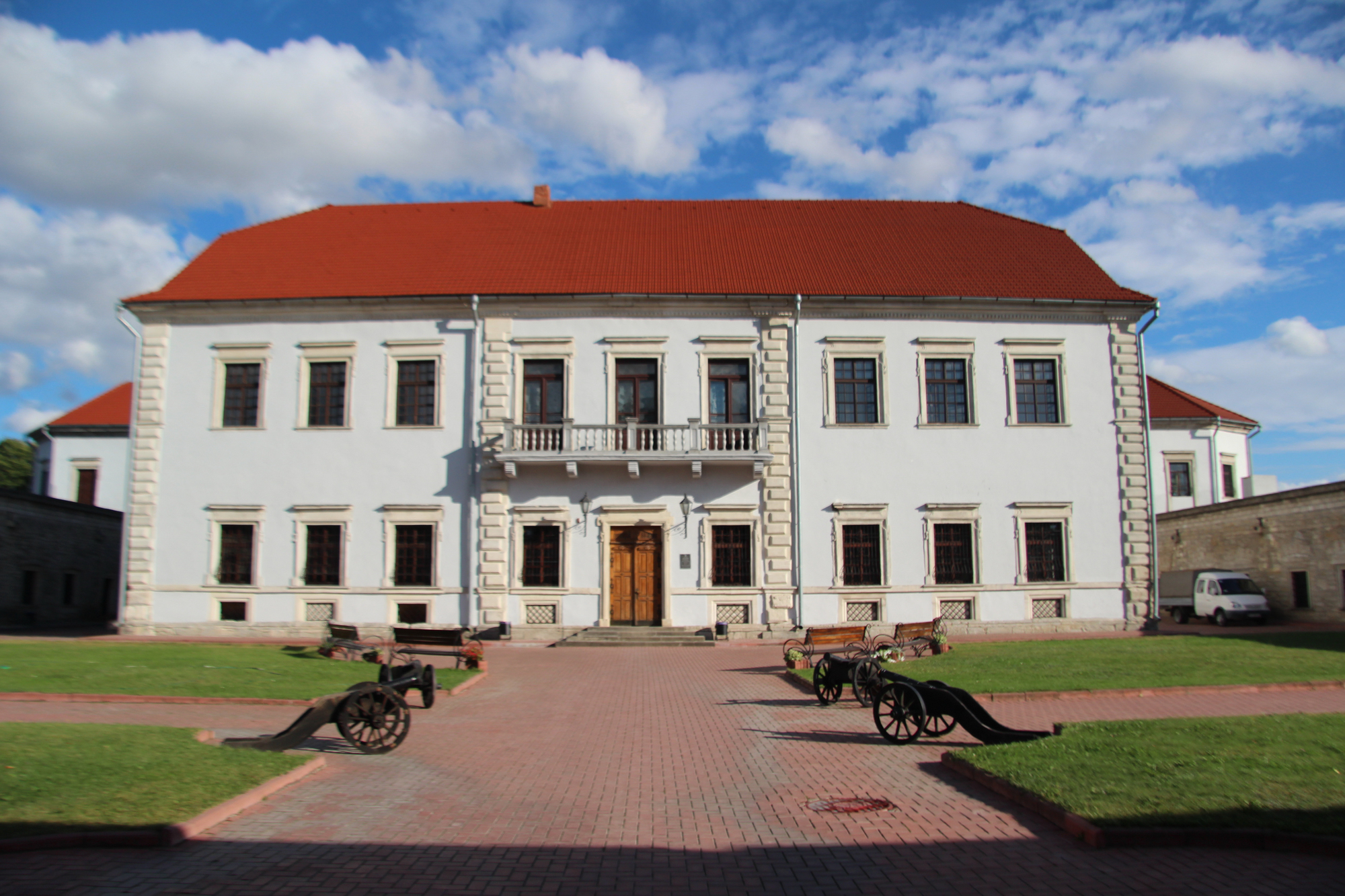
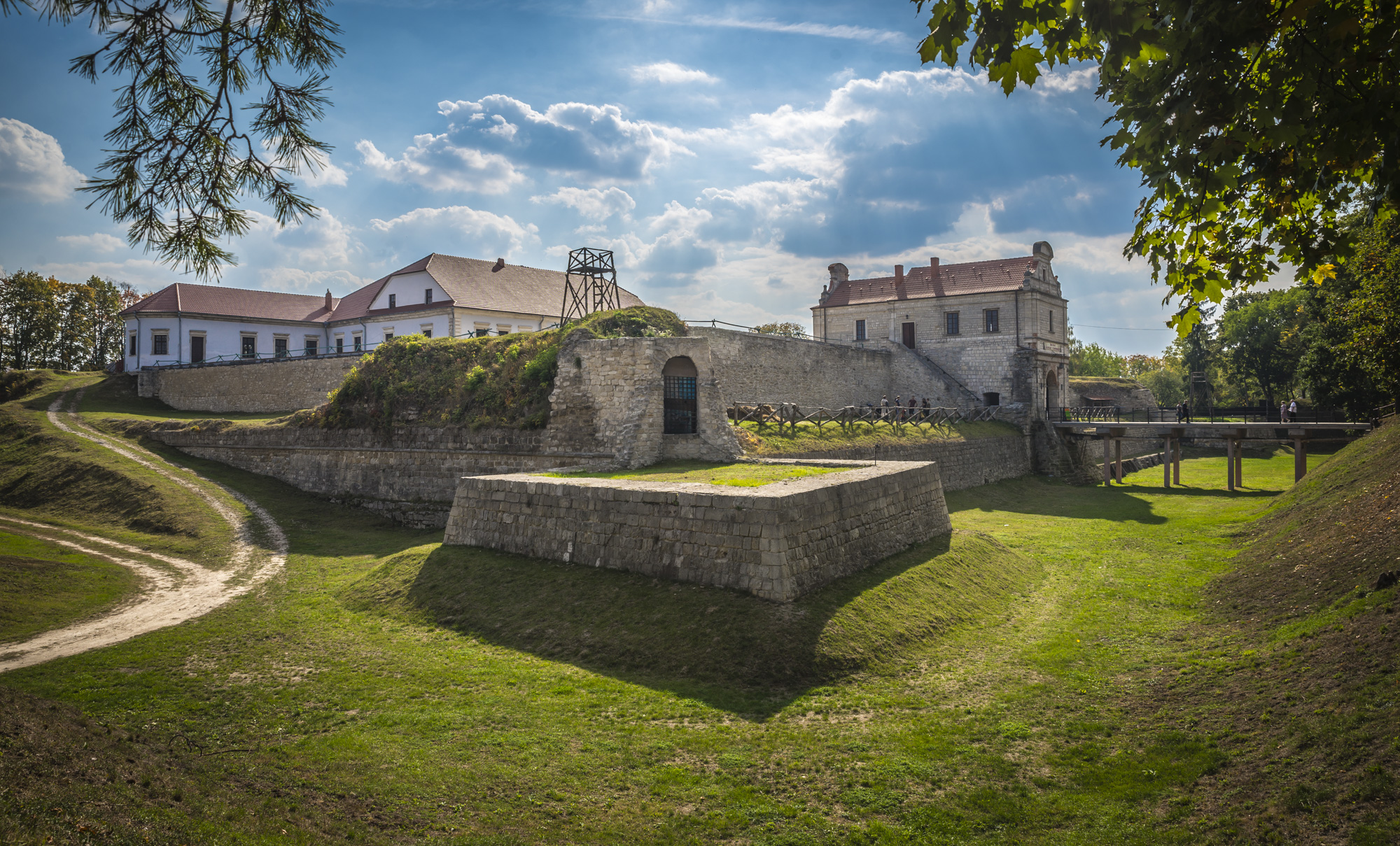
- Clockwise from top: Bernadine Monastery; Palace in the Castle; Castle; Entrance Gate of the Castle

- Flag Coat of arms
- Interactive map of Zbarazh
- Location of Zbarazh in Ukraine Zbarazh (Ukraine)
- Coordinates: 49°40′0″N 25°46′40″E
- Country: Ukraine
- Oblast: Ternopil Oblast
- Raion: Ternopil Raion
- Hromada: Zbarazh urban hromada
- First mentioned: 1211

Area
  - Total: 7 km^{2} (2.7 sq mi)

Population (2022)
  - Total: 13,346
  - Density: 1,900/km^{2} (4,900/sq mi)
- Time zone: UTC+2 (EET)
  - Summer (DST): UTC+3 (EEST)

Zbarazh (Ukrainian: Збараж, IPA: [ˈzbɑrɐʒ]; Polish: Zbaraż; Yiddish: זבאריזש, romanized: Zbarizh) is a small city in Ternopil Raion, Ternopil Oblast, western Ukraine. It is located in the historic region of Galicia. Zbarazh hosts the administration of Zbarazh urban hromada, one of the hromadas of Ukraine. Population: 13,346 (2022 estimate).

Zbarazh is one of the settings of Henryk Sienkiewicz's novel With Fire and Sword (1884) in which he gives a detailed description of the famous Siege of Zbarazh. Notable Jewish residents included Rabbi Zev Wolf of Zbaraz, the singer Velvel Zbarjer and the author Ida Fink.

== History ==
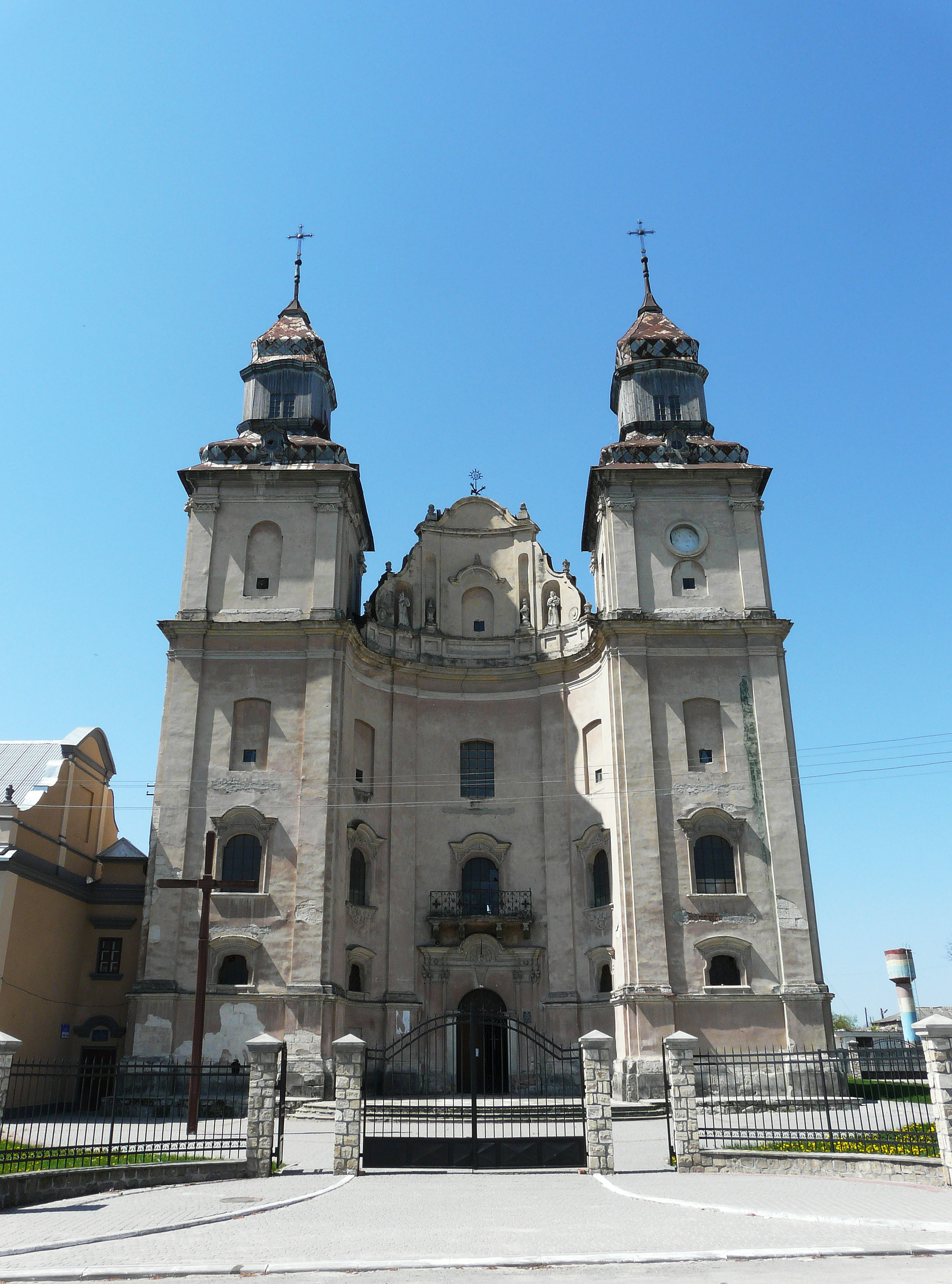
Saviour Church (ca. 1600)

Zbarazh was first attested in 1211 as a Ruthenian defensive fortress. Ruins of its original castle are extant in the village of Staryi Zbarazh near the modern city. Towards the end of the 14th century it became a possession of Gediminid princes.

In 1430-1431 Zbarazh was contested between Jagiello and Svitrigaila. It eventually became part of Volhynia, and during the second half of the 15th century served as the centre of a fiefdom owned by the Nieswicki family. After 1463, the fiefdom was separated into four parts, with the branch of the family ruling Zbarazh receiving the name of Zbaraski.

Following the 1569 Union of Lublin, Zbarazh became part of Kingdom of Poland's Krzemieniec County and Volhynian Voivodeship. In 1631 the city passed to the Wiśniowiecki family. In 1649, troops of Jeremi Wiśniowiecki were besieged in Zbarazh by forces commanded by Bohdan Khmelnytsky. In 1674 the city was destroyed by the Ottomans.

After the first partition of Poland in 1772, the town was seized by the Habsburg monarchy, and remained in the province of Galicia until 1918. In 1883 archaeological excavations were performed in the vicinity of Zbarazh by Adam Kirkor.

In the immediate post-World War I period, a Polish–Ukrainian War took place in Eastern Galicia. After the conflict, Zbarazh returned to Poland, becoming the seat of a county in Tarnopol Voivodeship. In the interbellum Second Polish Republic, it had a population of 8,000, with Jewish, Polish and Ukrainian communities.

Zbarazh was occupied by the Germans on July 4, 1941, but before the occupation authority was in place, Ukrainian nationalists instigated a pogrom that murdered twenty Jews and burned two synagogues. Soviet prisoners of war were also killed. By the time of the German invasion, the Jewish population of around 3000 had swelled to around 5000 because of refugees from western Poland. Later in 1941, the German security police murdered 70 Jews in the Lubianka Forest. In 1942, around 3000 Jews were sent from Zbarazh to the Belzec killing camp on four occasions, sometimes by way of Tarnopol. In October, some Jews were sent to the Janowska Street camp in Lwow and others were killed in Zbarazh. After that, the Germans established a ghetto for the 2000 Jews from Zbarazh and neighboring areas that had been sent to the town. About 20 people shared each room in the ghetto. In the expectation of further deportations, some Jews found hiding places. Nonetheless, in November, another 1000 Jews were sent to Belzec. During the winter of 1942-43, many Jews starved and died from disease. Others were sent to slave labor camps. In April 1943, another 1000 Jews were murdered near the Zbarazh railway station, and in June, German and Ukrainian police shot the remaining few hundred Jews. After that, Germans and Ukrainians hunted down Jews who were hidden in the forests. Only about 60 Zbarazh Jews survived, of the 3000 who had lived in the town before the war.

After World War II, the town was annexed by the Soviet Union. Local Poles were ordered to move to the Recovered Territories. Now Zbarazh is part of Ukraine.

Until 18 July 2020, Zbarazh served as an administrative center of Zbarazh Raion. The raion was abolished in July 2020 as part of the administrative reform of Ukraine, which reduced the number of raions of Ternopil Oblast to three. The area of Zbarazh Raion was split between Kremenets and Ternopil Raions, with Zbarazh being transferred to Ternopil Raion.

== Points of interest ==
Throughout the centuries, Zbarazh was the capital of the properties of the Zbaraski family. After the line had ended, the town was transferred to the Wiśniowiecki family. It also belonged to the Potocki family. The new Zbarazh Castle was designed for Prince Jeremi Wiśniowiecki in a post-Palladian Italian idiom similar to Scamozzi's by the Dutch architect van Peyen in 1626–31. The castle was partly rebuilt in the 18th century. A palace constructed for the family is located in the nearby town of Vyshnivets.

Zbarazh also preserves several remarkable churches, notably the Saviour Church (1600) and the Bernardine Monastery (1627). The Zbarazh Fortress was twice besieged by the Crimean Tatars (1474, 1589). After the second siege, a new castle was completed in 1626. In 1649, during the Khmelnytsky Uprising, the castle was besieged by the Cossacks and their Tatar allies. Defended for 43 days by Polish troops under Jeremi Wiśniowiecki (10 July–22 August), it was not captured.

The local Roman Catholic church was funded in the mid-17th century by Janusz Wisniowiecki. Destroyed by the Ottoman Turks in 1675, it was rebuilt in 1755, together with a new monastery. In the main nave of the church there was a commemorative plaque in memory of the 100th birth anniversary of Adam Mickiewicz. In the interbellum period, Bernardine monks from Zbaraz operated a middle school here. Neither the church and monastery were destroyed during World War II. In the monastery a hospital, later a plant were located, while the church was turned into a warehouse. Some items were saved by the Polish residents, who removed and took them to Poland in 1945. Currently, these items are kept in Bernardine churches in Leżajsk, Rzeszów and Alwernia.

After the end of the Communist period, the church was handed back to the monks. A first service took place on 3 September 2000.

== Demographics ==
As of the 2001 Ukrainian census, Zbarazh had a population of 13,053 inhabitants. Ukrainians account for almost 98% of the population, while the remainder of the population mostly claims to be of Polish and Russian descent. The exact ethnic composition was as follows:

Ethnic groups in Zbarazh
	percent
Ukrainians	97.69%
Russians	1.64%
Poles	0.30%
others	1.37%

== Notable people ==
- Ignacy Daszyński (1886–1936), Polish politician and former Prime Minister of Poland
- Ida Fink (1921–2011), Israeli-Polish writer
- Meshullam Feivush Heller (c. 1742–1794), Hasidic author
- Dmytro Klyachkivsky (1911–1945), also known as Klym Savur, Ukrainian Insurgent Army commander
- Karol Kuryluk (1910–1967), Polish social activist
- Ivan Prasko (1914–2001), Ukrainian-Australian Greek-Catholic bishop
- Zev Wolf of Zbaraz (died 1822), rabbi
- Velvel Zbarjer (1824–1884), Broder singer
- Serhiy Prytula (born 1981), Ukrainian TV show host, political activist, founder of Charity Foundation of Serhiy Prytula^{[uk]}

== Gallery ==
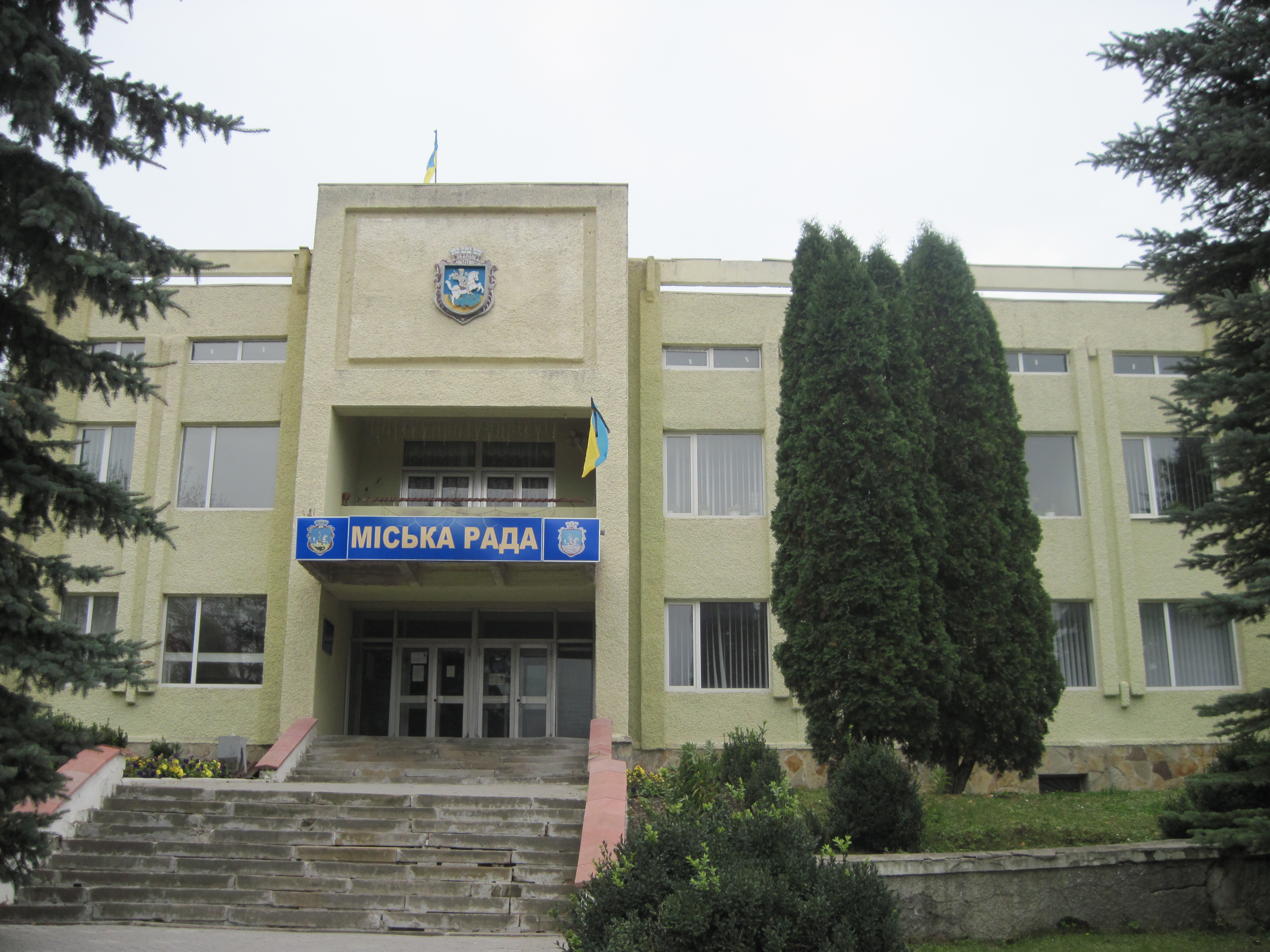
City hall

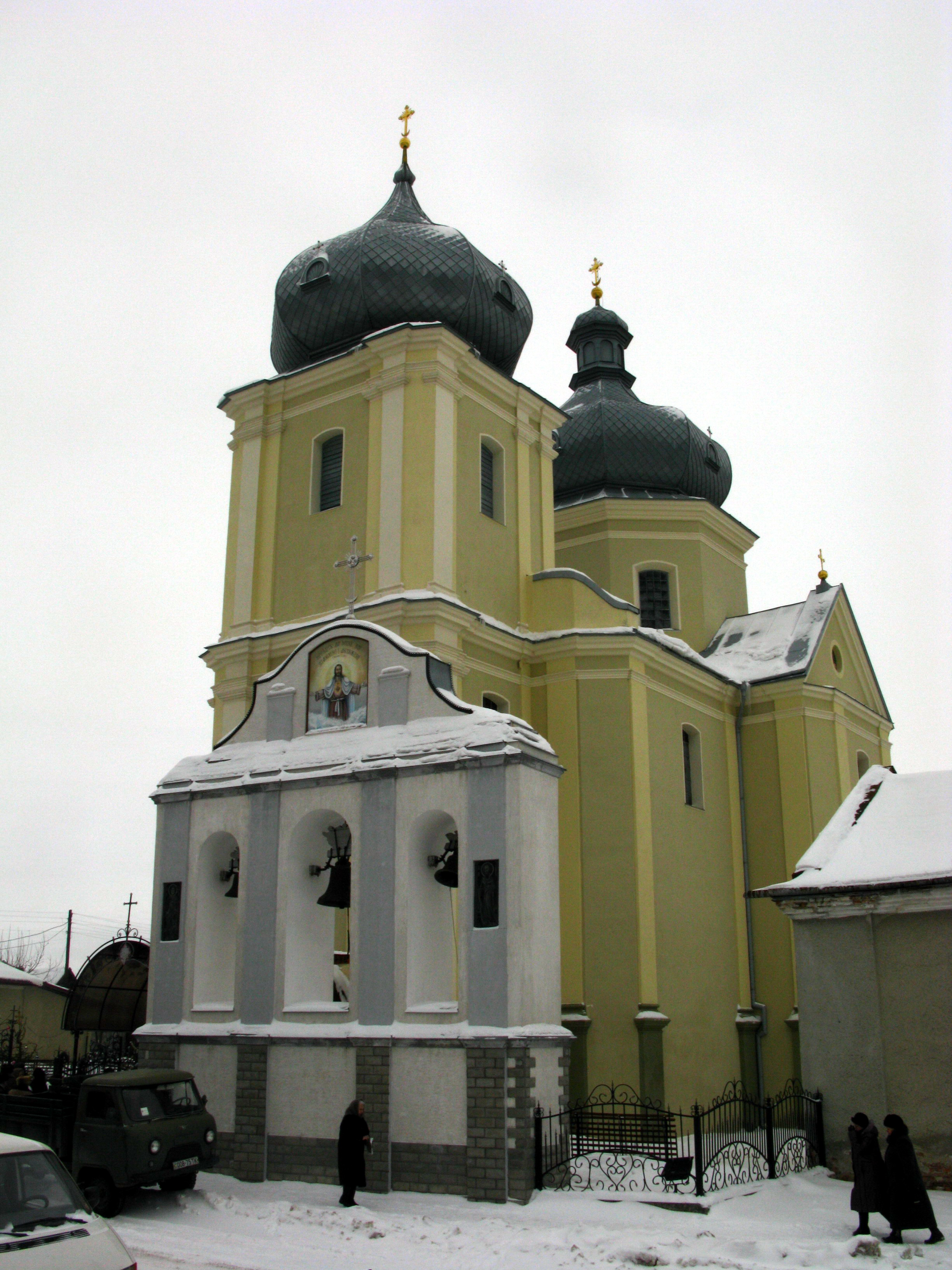
Resurrection Church

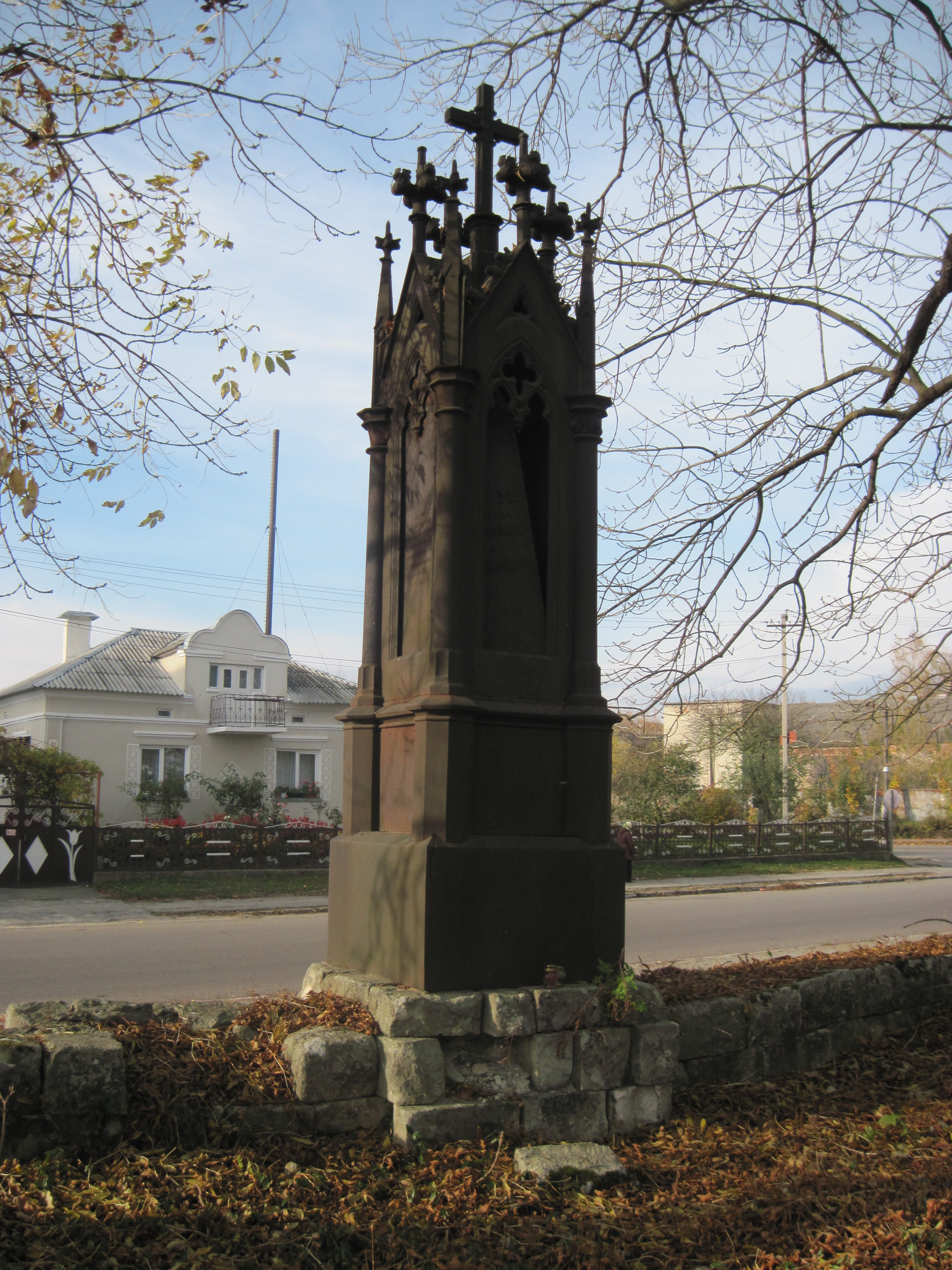
Old cemetery entrance

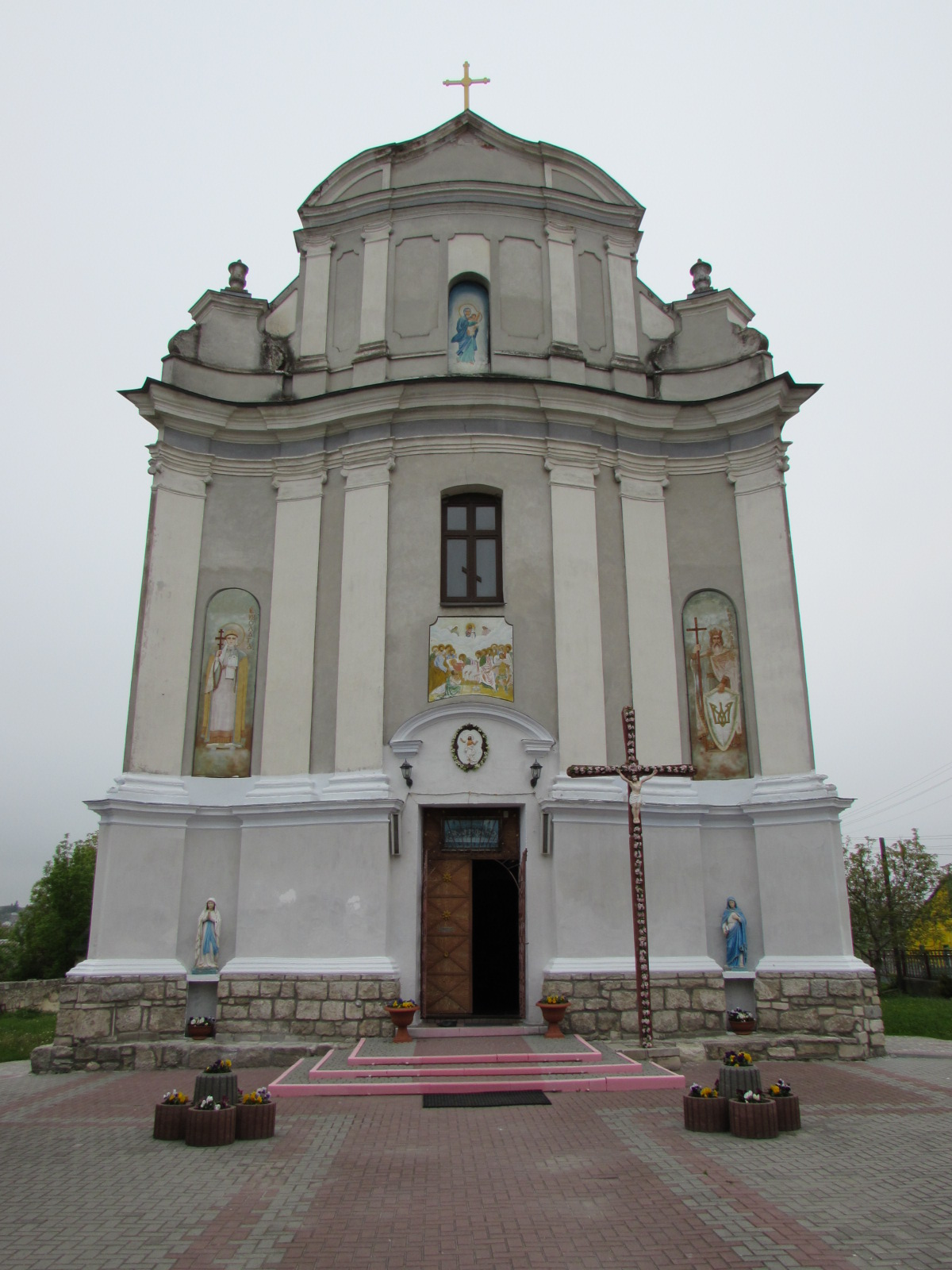
Church of Dormition

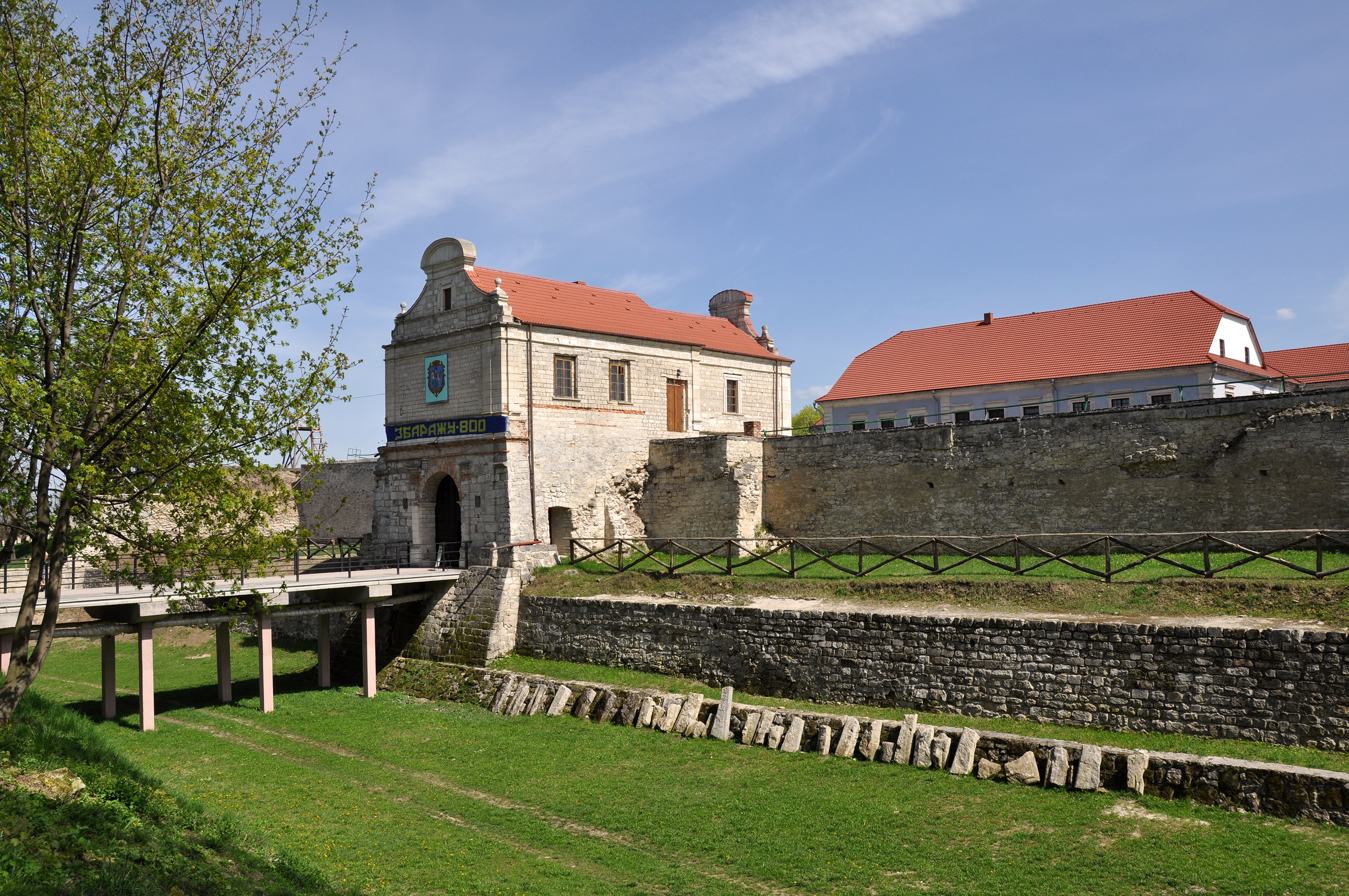
Zbarazh Castle

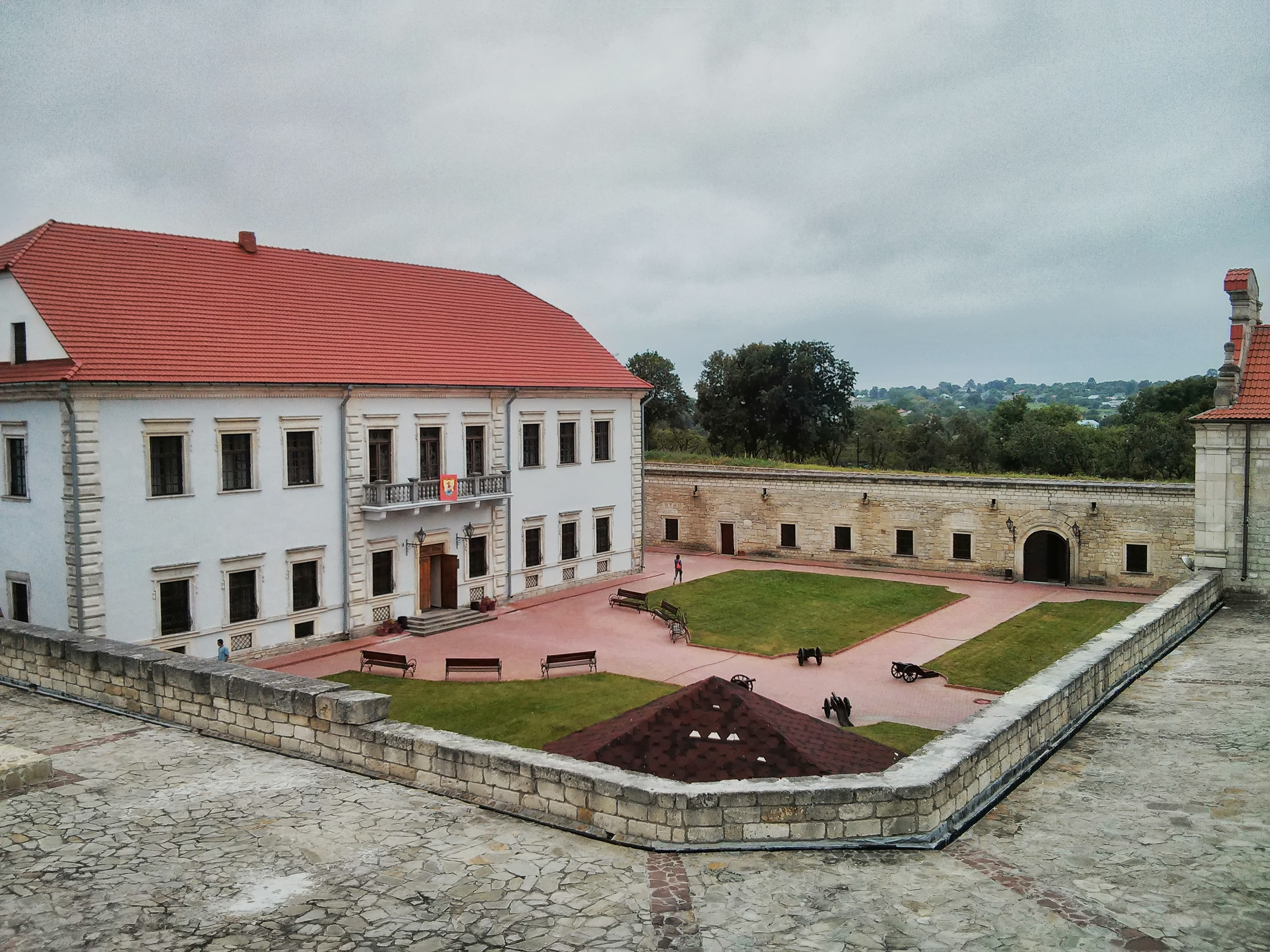
Palace inside the Castle
