= Zev Wolf of Zbaraz =

Hasidic rabbi

Zev Wolf of Zbaraz (died 3 Nisan (25 March) 1822) was a Hasidic rabbi. He was the third son of Rabbi Yechiel Michel of Zlotshov, known as "The Maggid of Zlotshov".

== See also ==
- Zev Wolf (disambiguation page)
