= Staryi Zbarazh =

Rural locality in Ternopil Oblast, Ukraine

Staryi Zbarazh Старий Збараж
- Location in Ternopil Oblast
- Coordinates: 49°39′1″N 25°44′58″E
- Country: Ukraine
- Oblast: Ternopil Oblast
- Raion: Ternopil Raion
- Hromada: Zbarazh urban hromada
- Time zone: UTC+2 (EET)
  - Summer (DST): UTC+3 (EEST)
- Postal code: 47304

Staryi Zbarazh (Ukrainian: Старий Збараж) is a village in the Zbarazh urban hromada of the Ternopil Raion of Ternopil Oblast in Ukraine.

== History ==
The first written mention of the village was in 1211.

After the liquidation of the Zbarazh Raion on 19 July 2020, the village became part of the Ternopil Raion.

== Religion ==
- St. Michael's church (1818, brick; restored in 1991).

== Monuments ==
- Staryi Zbarazh Castle

== Sources ==
- (in Ukrainian) Бігус М., Ковальков Ю., Походай І., Старий Збараж // Ternopil Encyclopedic Dictionary: in 4 v. / editorial board: H. Yavorskyi and other, Ternopil: "Zbruch", 2008, V. 3: П—Я, S. 332. — ISBN 978-966-528-279-2.
- "Zbaraż 2.) Z. Stary". Geographical Dictionary of the Kingdom of Poland (in Polish). 14. Warszawa: Kasa im. Józefa Mianowskiego. 1895. p. 512.
