= Łomnicki =

Polish surname

Łomnicki (feminine: Łomnicka) is a Polish surname. Notable people with the surname include:

- Adam Łomnicki (1935–2011), Polish biologist
- Antoni Łomnicki (1881–1941), Polish mathematician
- Eva Lomnicka (born 1951), British law professor
- Jan Łomnicki (1929–2002), Polish director
- Jarosław Łomnicki (1873–1931), Polish entomologist
- Marian Łomnicki (1845–1915), Polish geologist
- Michelle Lomnicki (born 1987), American soccer player
- Nikola Lomnická (born 1988), Slovak hammer thrower
- Tadeusz Łomnicki (1927–1992), Polish actor

== See also ==
- Kolonia Łomnicka
- Bystrzyca Łomnicka
- Lomnička (disambiguation)
