= Lomnička =

Lomnička may refer to places:

- Lomnička (Brno-Country District) in the Czech Republic
- Lomnička (Stará Ľubovňa District) in Slovakia

== See also ==
- Łomnicki
- Kolonia Łomnicka
- Bystrzyca Łomnicka
