= Yakym Senkivskyi =

Ukrainian Catholic priest and martyr (1896–1941)

Yakym Senkivskyi (Ukrainian: Яким Сеньківський; 2 May 1896 – 29 June 1941) was a Ukrainian Greek Catholic priest and martyr.

== Life ==
Senkivskyi was born in the village of Velyki Hayi in the Kingdom of Galicia and Lodomeria (present-day Velyki Hayi, Ternopil Oblast, Ukraine). He studied theology in Lviv, Ukraine and was ordained a priest on 4 December 1921. He received a doctorate in theology from Innsbruck, Austria. In 1923 he went to Krekhiv and became a novice in the Order of Saint Basil the Great. After he professed his first vows, he was transferred to the village of Krasnopushcha, and later to the village of Lavriv, in the area of Starosambir. From 1931 to 1938 he held different positions in the Monastery of Saint Onufrius in Lviv, where he served as a chaplain of the Marian Society, ministered to children and youth and organized a Eucharistic Society. In 1939, he was appointed abbot (hegumen) of the monastery in Drohobych.

== Death and beatification ==
On June 26, 1941, he was arrested by the Soviet NKVD, and on June 29, according to various prisoners, he was boiled in a cauldron in the Drohobych prison.

He was beatified by Pope John Paul II on June 27, 2001.

== Legacy ==
Orest Kupranets recounts the life of Senkivskyi in his memoirs. "From the first days of his time in Drohobych he became the favorite of the whole town. He gained the affection of the population with his remarkable talent, his ability to speak to scholar and labor, young and old, and even to the little child. He was always polite, with a warm smile on his face. In your soul you felt that this person had no malice, and, in addition to the impression of humility and dignity, a true servant of Christ was evident."
