= Jarosław Łomnicki =

Polish entomologist, geologist and paleontologist

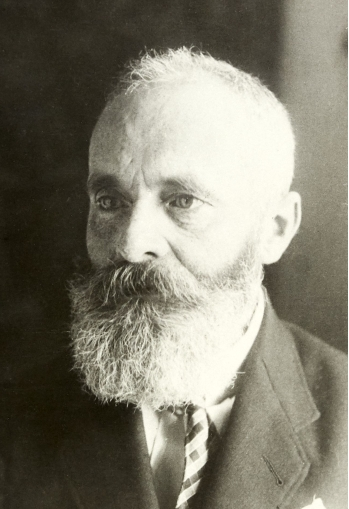

Jarosław Ludomir Łomnicki (19 May 1873 – 15 April 1931) was a Polish geologist and entomologist. Son of the paleontologist Marian Łomnicki, he succeeded as curator of the Dzieduszycki Museum in Lviv.

Łomnicki was born in Stanisławów (Stanisau), Galicia to Marian Łomnicki. The family moved to Lviv in 1879 where he went to school and gymnasium. His father was involved in museum work and as a young boy he too was introduced to it and travelled on collection trips into Galicia. After graduation, he joined Lviv University in 1891 and then worked as a zoology assistant at the Jagiellonian University (1893-94). He returned to Lviv and worked as an assistant in the mineralogy and geology department at Lviv Polytechnic (1896-98). He qualified the teacher's exam of the University of Vienna (1897) and taught at the Krakow Gymnasium and at Kolomyia. He moved to Lviv following the death of his father. From 1913 he worked on the Geological Atlas of the Physiographic Commission of the Polish Academy of Sciences in Kraków and was a member of the Geographical Commission of the academy. He also collected insects and worked on the Formicidae, Coleoptera, and fossil Foraminifera from the Miocene period. His brother Antoni Łomnicki (1881–1941) was a mathematician who was killed during the Massacre of Lviv professors.

Łomnicki published nearly 45 papers, describing nearly 700 new insect species, and was a member of the Copernicus Society where he began an entomological section. It later became the Polish Entomological Society over which he presided. He is buried in Lychakiv cemetery in Lviv.
