= Smolianka, Ternopil Oblast =

Rural locality in Ternopil Oblast, Ukraine

Smolianka Смолянка
- Location in Ternopil Oblast
- Coordinates: 49°25′26″N 25°43′25″E
- Country: Ukraine
- Oblast: Ternopil Oblast
- Raion: Ternopil Raion
- Hromada: Velyki Hayi rural hromada
- Time zone: UTC+2 (EET)
  - Summer (DST): UTC+3 (EEST)
- Postal code: 47744

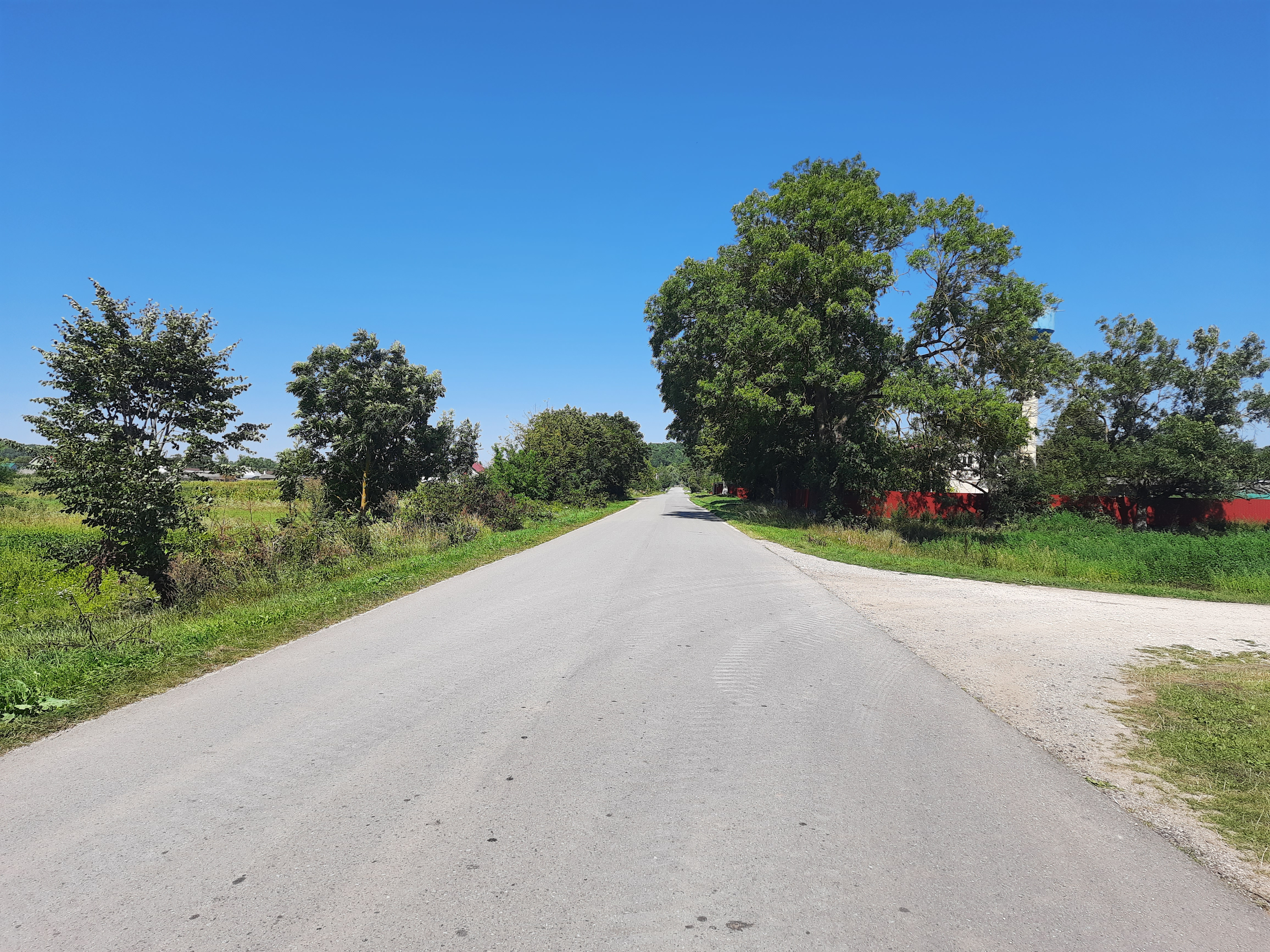
Road entering the village

Smolianka (Ukrainian: Смолянка) is a village in Velyki Hayi rural hromada, Ternopil Raion, Ternopil Oblast, Ukraine.

== History ==
In the 18th century, it was recorded in documents as a folwark, where the Bavorovskyi's had their residence.

== Religion ==
- Church of the Presentation of the Blessed Virgin Mary (1780, brick).

== Sources ==
- (in Ukrainian) Новосядла Н., Смолянка // Ternopil Encyclopedic Dictionary: in 4 v. / editorial board: H. Yavorskyi and other, Ternopil: "Zbruch", 2008, V. 3: П—Я, S. 302. — ISBN 978-966-528-279-2.
- "Smolanka z Cezarówką". Geographical Dictionary of the Kingdom of Poland (in Polish). 10. Warszawa: Kasa im. Józefa Mianowskiego. 1889. p. 893.
