= Velyki Hai =

Rural locality in Ternopil Oblast, Ukraine

Velyki Hai Великі Гаї
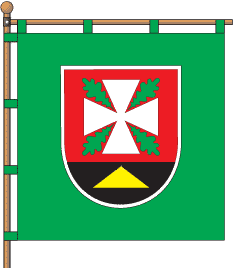
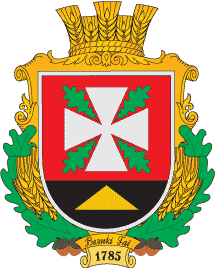
- Flag Coat of arms
- Interactive map of Velyki Hai
- Location in Ternopil Oblast Velyki Hai (Ukraine)
- Coordinates: 49°31′10″N 25°38′39″E
- Country: Ukraine
- Oblast: Ternopil Oblast
- Raion: Ternopil Raion
- Hromada: Velyki Hayi rural hromada
- Time zone: UTC+2 (EET)
  - Summer (DST): UTC+3 (EEST)
- Postal code: 47722

Velyki Hai (Ukrainian: Великі Гаї) is a village in Velyki Hayi rural hromada, Ternopil Raion, Ternopil Oblast, Ukraine. It is located on eastern outskirts of Ternopil.

== History ==
The first written mention of the village could be traced to 1785.

== Culture and religion ==
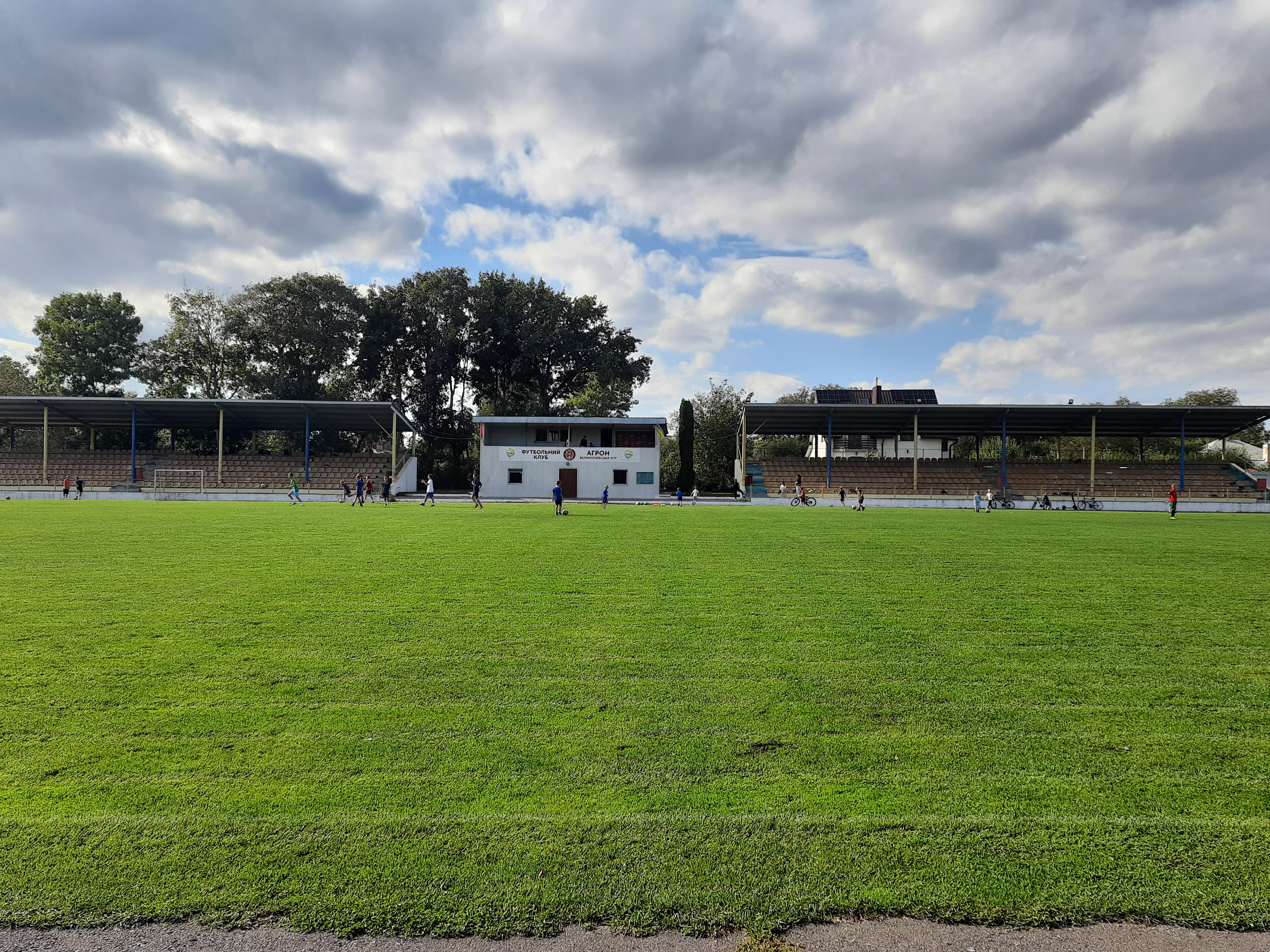
stadium

=== Sport ===
The village has a rich football history, having participated in national competitions. Since 2015, the village has had Football Club Ahron that competes at the AAFU competitions.

=== Religion and temples ===
- Building of the Church of the Sacred Heart of Christ (1910, restored in 1989).

== Notable residents ==
- Yakym Senkivskyi (1896–1941), Ukrainian Greek Catholic priest and martyr

== Sources ==
- (in Ukrainian) Уніят В., Великі Гаї // Ternopil Encyclopedic Dictionary: in 4 v. / editorial board: H. Yavorskyi and other, Ternopil: "Zbruch", 2004, V. 1: А—Й, S. 240—241. — ISBN 966-528-197-6.
