= Bavoriv =

Rural locality in Ternopil Oblast, Ukraine

Bavoriv Баворів
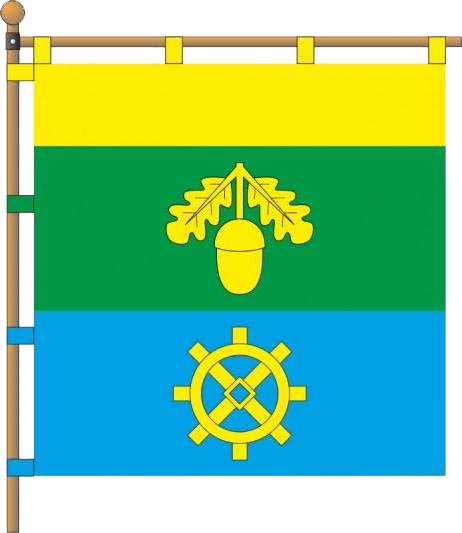
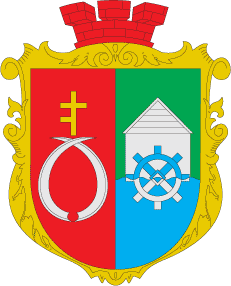
- Flag Coat of arms

- Location in Ternopil Oblast
- Coordinates: 49°26′23″N 25°43′19″E
- Country: Ukraine
- Oblast: Ternopil Oblast
- Raion: Ternopil Raion
- Hromada: Velyki Hayi rural hromada
- Time zone: UTC+2 (EET)
  - Summer (DST): UTC+3 (EEST)
- Postal code: 47743

Bavoriv (Ukrainian: Баворів) is a village in Velyki Hayi rural hromada, Ternopil Raion, Ternopil Oblast, Ukraine.

== History ==
The first written mention of the village was in 1447.

== Religion ==
- Church of the Nativity of John the Baptist (16th century, according to other sources 1747, brick; architectural monument of national importance),
- Roman Catholic Church of the Assumption (1759, restored in 2012).

== Monuments ==
- Bavoriv Castle

== Notable residents ==
- Marian Łomnicki (1845–1915), Polish geologist, zoologist, paleontologist and encyclopedist

== Sources ==
- (in Ukrainian) Мельничук Б., Уніят В., Баворів // Ternopil Encyclopedic Dictionary: in 4 v. / editorial board: H. Yavorskyi and other, Ternopil: "Zbruch", 2004, V. 1: А—Й, S. 64. — ISBN 966-528-197-6.
- "Baworów". Geographical Dictionary of the Kingdom of Poland (in Polish). 1. Warszawa: Kasa im. Józefa Mianowskiego. 1880. p. 119.
