= Zastinka =

Rural locality in Ternopil Oblast, Ukraine

Zastinka Застінка
- Location in Ternopil Oblast
- Coordinates: 49°28′14″N 25°43′27″E
- Country: Ukraine
- Oblast: Ternopil Oblast
- Raion: Ternopil Raion
- Hromada: Velyki Hayi rural hromada
- Time zone: UTC+2 (EET)
  - Summer (DST): UTC+3 (EEST)
- Postal code: 47759

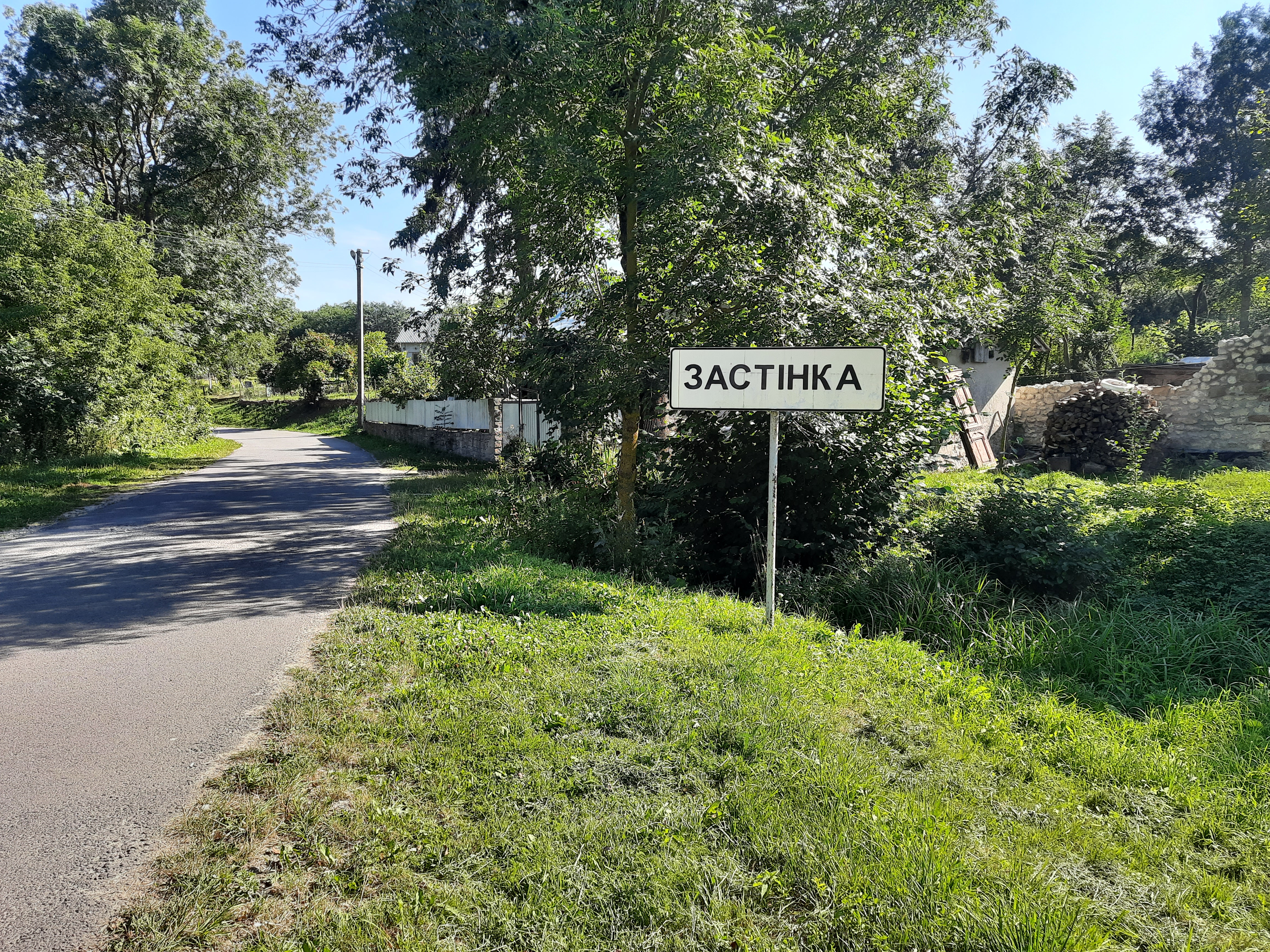

Zastinka (Ukrainian: Застінка) is a village in Velyki Hayi rural hromada, Ternopil Raion, Ternopil Oblast, Ukraine.

== History ==
The first written mention of the village was in 1564.

== Religion ==
- Saint Paraskeva church (1902–1908; brick; 2002).

== Sources ==
- (in Ukrainian) , Застінка // Ternopil Encyclopedic Dictionary: in 4 v. / editorial board: H. Yavorskyi and other, Ternopil: "Zbruch", 2004, V. 1: А—Й, 696 s. — ISBN 966-528-197-6.
- "Zaścianka". Geographical Dictionary of the Kingdom of Poland (in Polish). 14. Warszawa: Kasa im. Józefa Mianowskiego. 1895. p. 438.
