= Teofilivka, Ternopil Oblast =

Rural locality in Ternopil Oblast, Ukraine

Teofilivka Теофілівка
- Location in Ternopil Oblast
- Coordinates: 49°24′8″N 25°42′10″E
- Country: Ukraine
- Oblast: Ternopil Oblast
- Raion: Ternopil Raion
- Hromada: Velyki Hayi rural hromada
- Time zone: UTC+2 (EET)
  - Summer (DST): UTC+3 (EEST)
- Postal code: 47744

Teofilivka (Ukrainian: Теофілівка) is a village in Velyki Hayi rural hromada, Ternopil Raion, Ternopil Oblast, Ukraine.

== History ==
The first written mention of the village was in 1920.

== Religion ==
- St. Demetrius church (converted in the early 2000s from a former school).

== Sources ==
- (in Ukrainian) Ханас В., Теофілівка // Ternopil Encyclopedic Dictionary: in 4 v. / editorial board: H. Yavorskyi and other, Ternopil: "Zbruch", 2008, V. 3: П—Я, S. 392. — ISBN 978-966-528-279-2.
