= Tovstoluh =

Rural locality in Ternopil Oblast, Ukraine

Tovstoluh Товстолуг
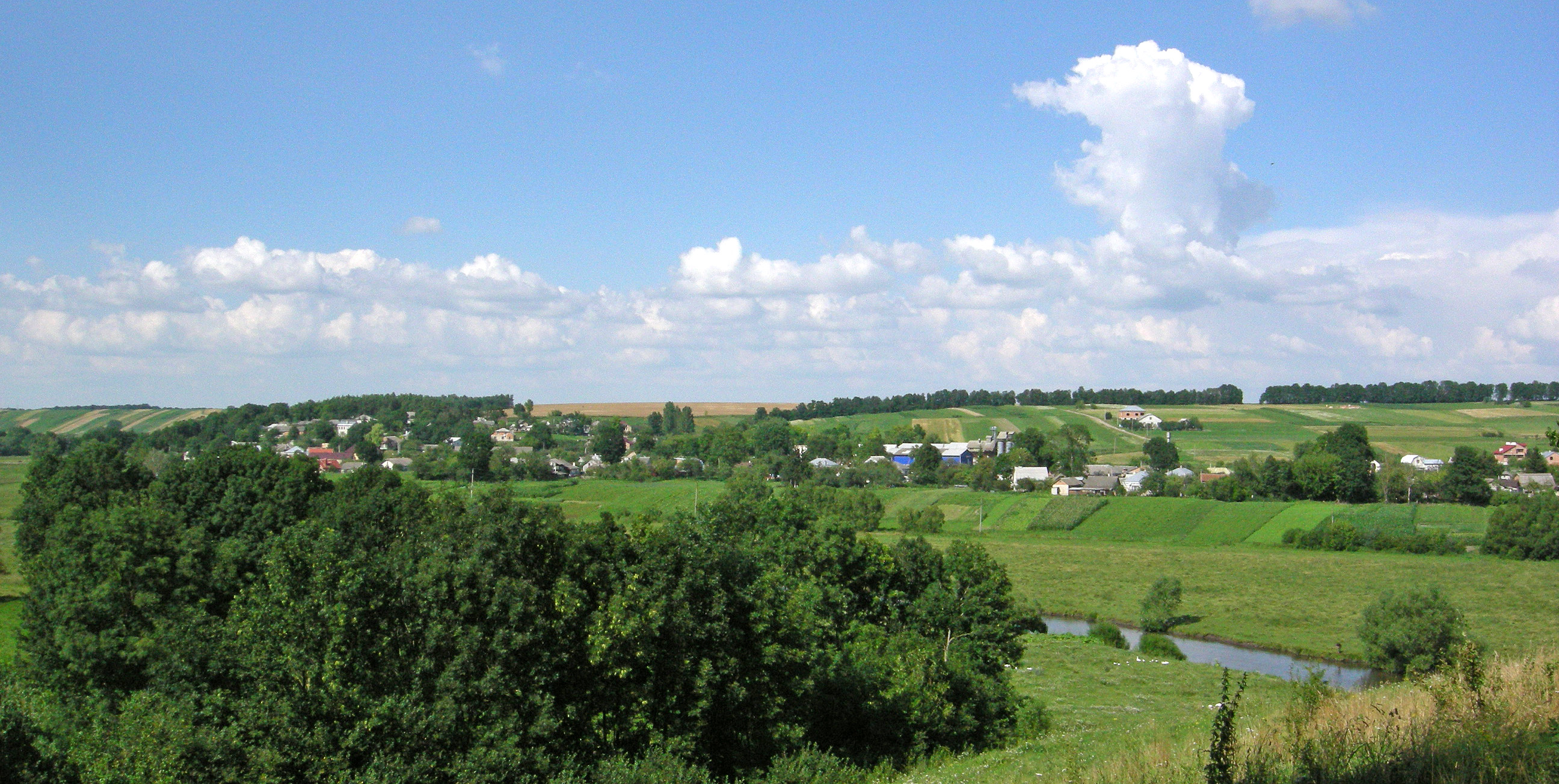

- Location in Ternopil Oblast
- Coordinates: 49°28′41″N 25°43′35″E
- Country: Ukraine
- Oblast: Ternopil Oblast
- Raion: Ternopil Raion
- Hromada: Velyki Hayi rural hromada
- Time zone: UTC+2 (EET)
  - Summer (DST): UTC+3 (EEST)
- Postal code: 47742

Tovstoluh (Ukrainian: Товстолуг) is a village in Velyki Hayi rural hromada, Ternopil Raion, Ternopil Oblast, Ukraine.

== History ==
The first written mention of the village was in 1482.

== Religion ==
- St. George church (1900, brick).

== Sources ==
- (in Ukrainian) І. Дем'янова, В. Уніят., Товстолуг // Ternopil Encyclopedic Dictionary: in 4 v. / editorial board: H. Yavorskyi and other, Ternopil: "Zbruch", 2008, V. 3: П—Я, S. 456. — ISBN 978-966-528-279-2.
- "Toustoług". Geographical Dictionary of the Kingdom of Poland (in Polish). 12. Warszawa: Kasa im. Józefa Mianowskiego. 1892. p. 438.
