= Zastavie, Ternopil Oblast =

Rural locality in Ternopil Oblast, Ukraine

Zastavie Застав'є
- Location in Ternopil Oblast
- Coordinates: 49°26′47″N 25°42′15″E
- Country: Ukraine
- Oblast: Ternopil Oblast
- Raion: Ternopil Raion
- Hromada: Velyki Hayi rural hromada
- Time zone: UTC+2 (EET)
  - Summer (DST): UTC+3 (EEST)
- Postal code: 47743

Zastavie (Ukrainian: Застав'є) is a village in Velyki Hayi rural hromada, Ternopil Raion, Ternopil Oblast, Ukraine.

== History ==
The first written mention of the village was in 1715.

== Religion ==
- Church of the Nativity of the Blessed Virgin Mary (UGCC, 2001),
- St. Demetrius church (OCU, 2003).

== Sources ==
- (in Ukrainian) Уніят В., Застав'є // Ternopil Encyclopedic Dictionary: in 4 v. / editorial board: H. Yavorskyi and other, Ternopil: "Zbruch", 2004, V. 1: А—Й, S. 626. — ISBN 966-528-197-6.
- "Zastawie". Geographical Dictionary of the Kingdom of Poland (in Polish). p. 715.
