= Kypiachka, Ternopil Oblast =

Rural locality in Ternopil Oblast, Ukraine

Kypiachka Кип'ячка
- Location in Ternopil Oblast
- Coordinates: 49°29′7″N 25°42′12″E
- Country: Ukraine
- Oblast: Ternopil Oblast
- Raion: Ternopil Raion
- Hromada: Velyki Hayi rural hromada
- Time zone: UTC+2 (EET)
  - Summer (DST): UTC+3 (EEST)
- Postal code: 47742

Kypiachka (Ukrainian: Кип'ячка) is a village in Velyki Hayi rural hromada, Ternopil Raion, Ternopil Oblast, Ukraine.

== History ==
The first written mention of the village was in 1532.

== Religion ==
- Church of the Nativity of the Blessed Virgin Mary (1772; brick).

== Notable residents ==
- Kyrylo Studynskyi (1868–1941), Ukrainian political and cultural figure from the late-19th to the mid-20th century

== Sources ==
- (in Ukrainian) Слюзар В., Уніят В., Кип'ячка // Ternopil Encyclopedic Dictionary: in 4 v. / editorial board: H. Yavorskyi and other, Ternopil: "Zbruch", 2005, V. 2: К—О, S. 68—69. — ISBN 966-528-199-2.
- "Kipiaczka". Geographical Dictionary of the Kingdom of Poland (in Polish). 4. Warszawa: Kasa im. Józefa Mianowskiego. 1883. p. 100.
