= Hrabovets, Ternopil Oblast =

Rural locality in Ternopil Oblast, Ukraine

Hrabovets Грабовець
- Location in Ternopil Oblast
- Coordinates: 49°26′50″N 25°44′31″E
- Country: Ukraine
- Oblast: Ternopil Oblast
- Raion: Ternopil Raion
- Hromada: Velyki Hayi rural hromada
- Time zone: UTC+2 (EET)
  - Summer (DST): UTC+3 (EEST)
- Postal code: 47743

Hrabovets (Ukrainian: Грабовець) is a village in Velyki Hayi rural hromada, Ternopil Raion, Ternopil Oblast, Ukraine.

== History ==
The first written mention of the village was in 1564.

== Religion ==
- Church of the Intercession (1887–1906, brick).

== Monuments ==
- The palace of the pan (1891, after 1920 belonged to the Polish Academy of Sciences.

== Sources ==
- (in Ukrainian) Сварник О., Уніят В., Грабовець // Ternopil Encyclopedic Dictionary: in 4 v. / editorial board: H. Yavorskyi and other, Ternopil: "Zbruch", 2004, V. 1: А—Й, S. 408. — ISBN 966-528-197-6.
- "Grabowiec 4, wś, pow. tarnopolski". Geographical Dictionary of the Kingdom of Poland (in Polish). 2. Warszawa: Kasa im. Józefa Mianowskiego. 1881. p. 777—778.
