= Biloskirka =

Rural locality in Ternopil Oblast, Ukraine

Biloskirka Білоскірка
- Location in Ternopil Oblast Biloskirka (Ternopil Oblast)
- Coordinates: 49°27′39″N 25°44′35″E
- Country: Ukraine
- Oblast: Ternopil Oblast
- Raion: Ternopil Raion
- Hromada: Velyki Hayi rural hromada
- Time zone: UTC+2 (EET)
  - Summer (DST): UTC+3 (EEST)
- Postal code: 47742

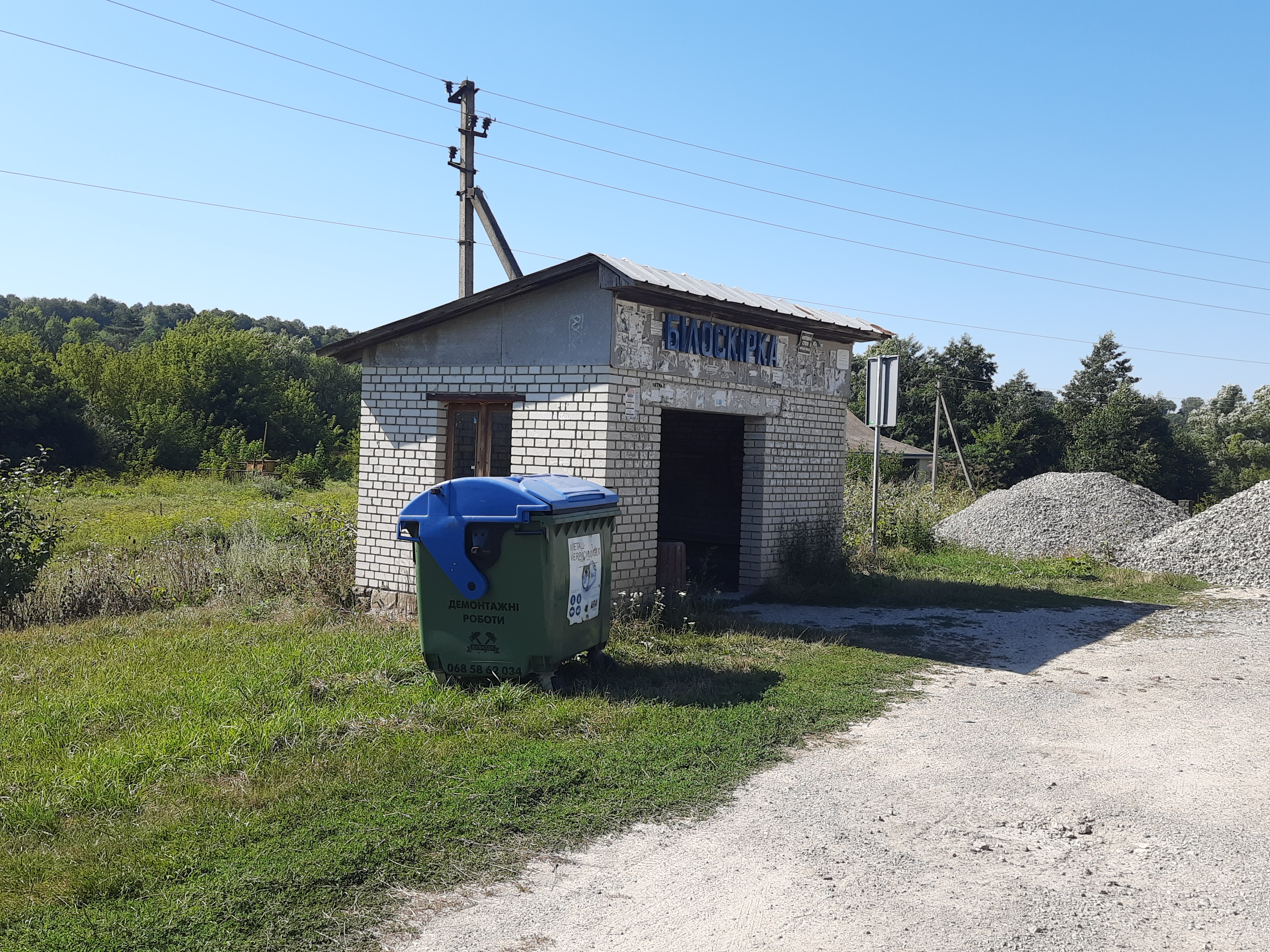
Bus stop

Biloskirka (Ukrainian: Білоскірка) is a village in Velyki Hayi rural hromada, Ternopil Raion, Ternopil Oblast, Ukraine.

== History ==
The first written mention of the village was in 1650.

== Religion ==
- Church of Christ the Man-lover (Heart of Christ; 1994; architect Vasyl Skochylias).

== Sources ==
- (in Ukrainian) Стоцький Я., Білоскірка // Ternopil Encyclopedic Dictionary: in 4 v. / editorial board: H. Yavorskyi and other, Ternopil: "Zbruch", 2004, V. 1: А—Й, S. 136—137. — ISBN 966-528-197-6.
- "Białoskórka". Geographical Dictionary of the Kingdom of Poland (in Polish). 1. Warszawa: Kasa im. Józefa Mianowskiego. 1880. p. 194.
