= Krekhiv Monastery =

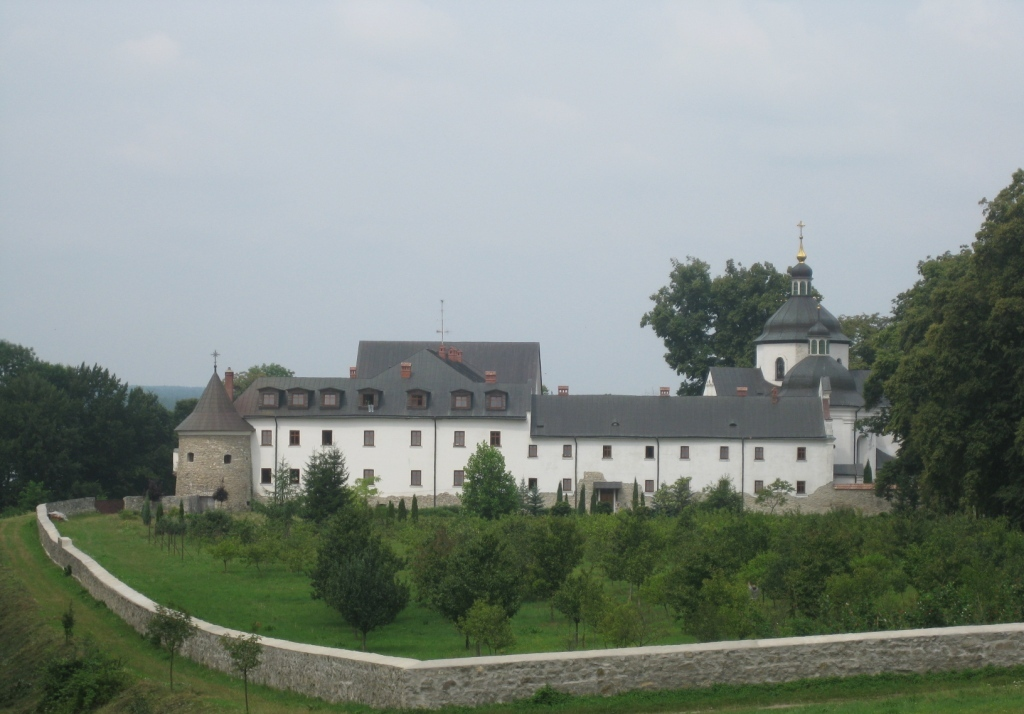
Krekhiv Monastery

The Krekhiv Monastery of St. Nicholas (Ukrainian: Крехівський монастир) of the Order of St. Basil the Great, founded in the early 17th century by monks Yoil and Silvestr from the Kyiv-Pechersk Lavra near the village of Krekhiv, Lviv Oblast.

== History ==
The monastery was built between 1619 and 1658, and in 1669 it received stone walls with five towers. The monastery received stauropegia in 1628 and enjoyed the support of hetmans Bohdan Khmelnytsky, Petro Doroshenko, and Ivan Mazepa. In 1721, it became Uniate (Greek Catholic), and in 1751, the stone St. Nicholas Church was built. From 1902, it housed the novitiate of the Basilian Order.

The monastery was famous for its rich library, which housed unique manuscripts. In particular, Ivan Franko studied the 15th-century Krekhiv Palaea, and Ilarion Ohienko studied the 16th-century Krekhiv Apostle. The main shrines that attracted pilgrims are two famous icons: St. Nicholas and the Holy Virgin Mary of Werchrata.

After the liquidation of the Ukrainian Greek Catholic Church in 1946, the monastery was closed and partially dismantled. Its revival began in 1990.

== Hegumens ==
- Yoiil
- Dionisii Sinkevych (†c. 1730), born in Rozdil, later abbot of St. George's Monastery in Lviv
- Sylvestr Lashchevskyi
- Ihnatii Sinhalevych (1841—1843)
- Varlaam Kompanevych
- Emiliian Kossak (1846—1881)
- Dionisii Tkachuk
- Pavlo Teodorovych
- Porfyrii Lutsyk
- Teodozii Yankiv
- Vasyl Tuchapets
- Panteleimon Salamakha
- Atanasii Yevush
- Ivan Maikovych
- Volodymyr Malaniuk

== Gallery ==
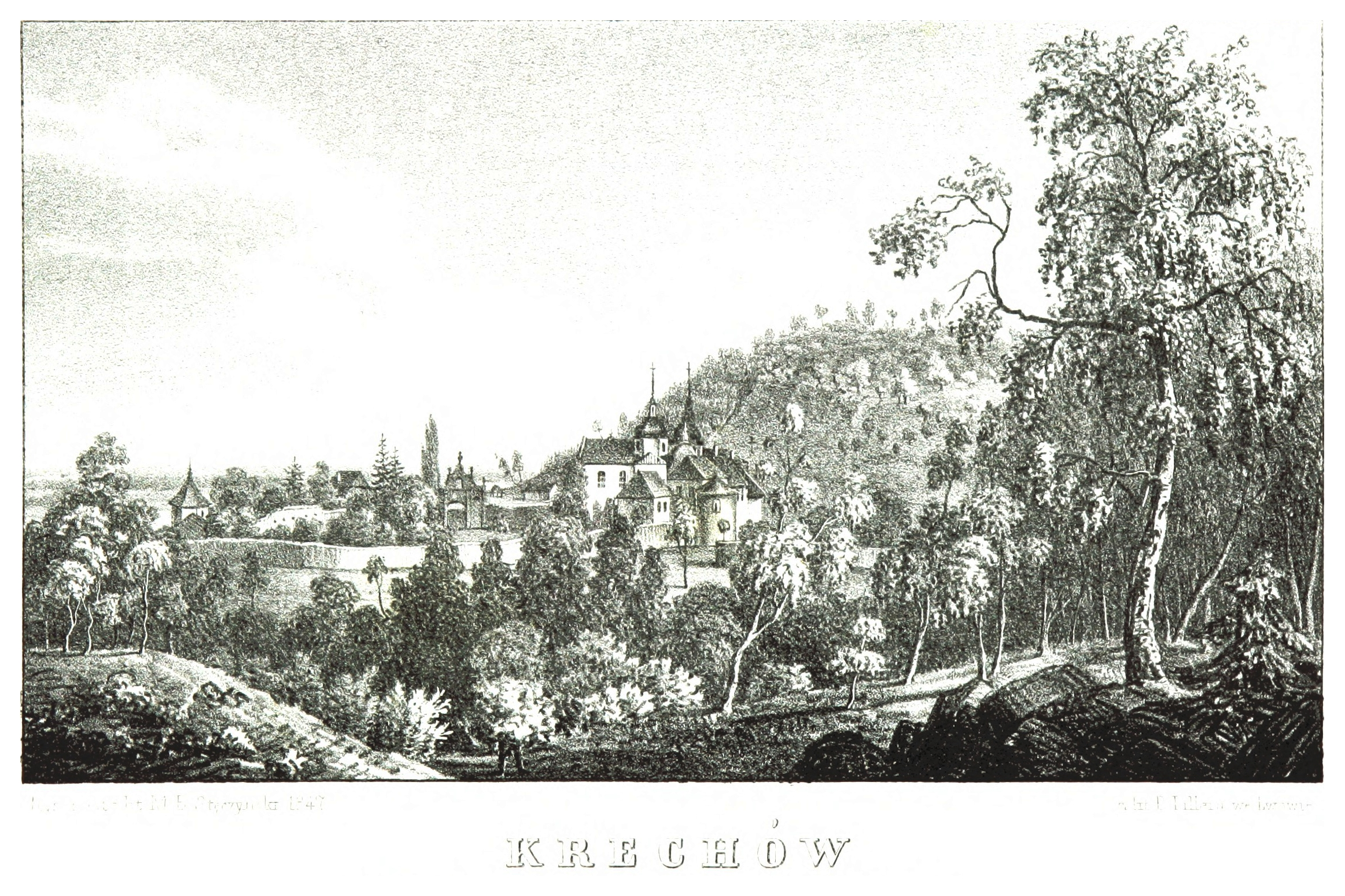
Krekhiv Monastery (1847)

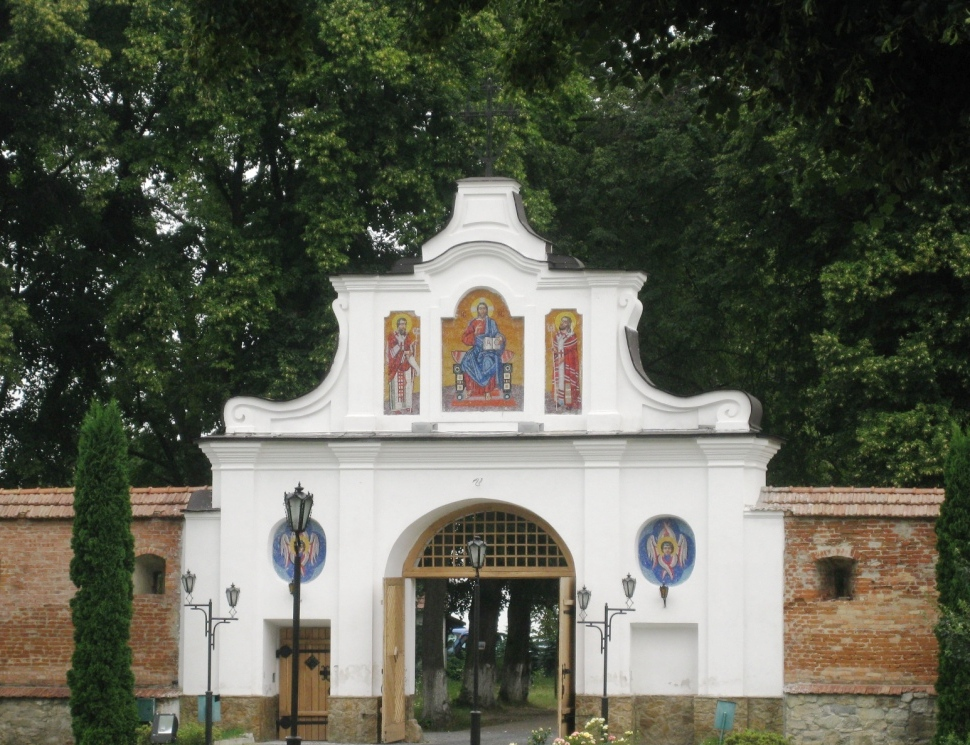
Monastery gate

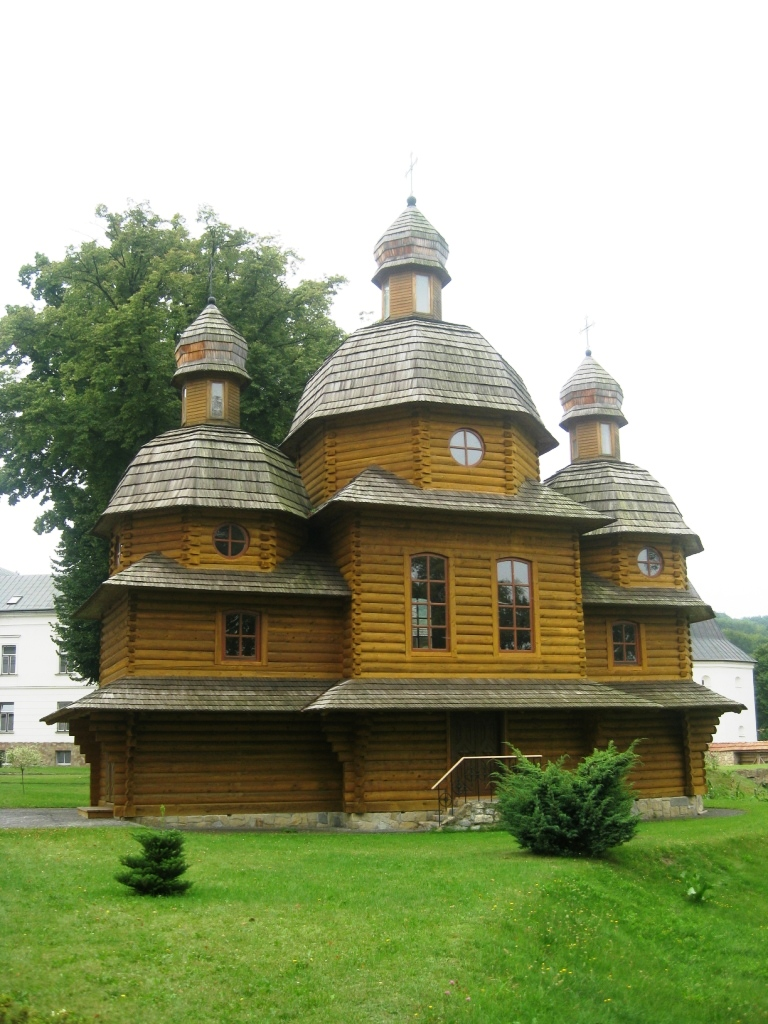
Church of the Intercession

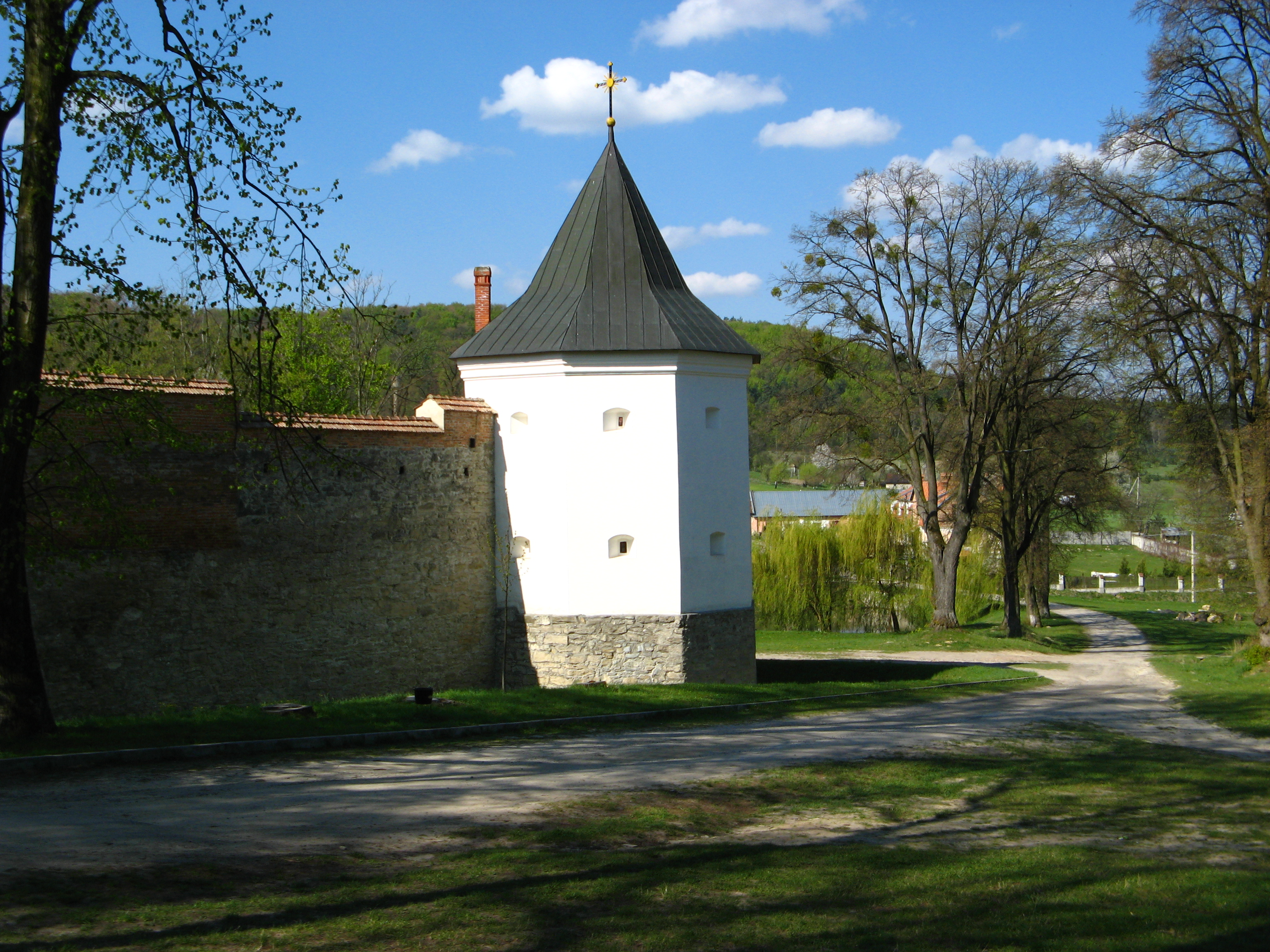
Corner tower

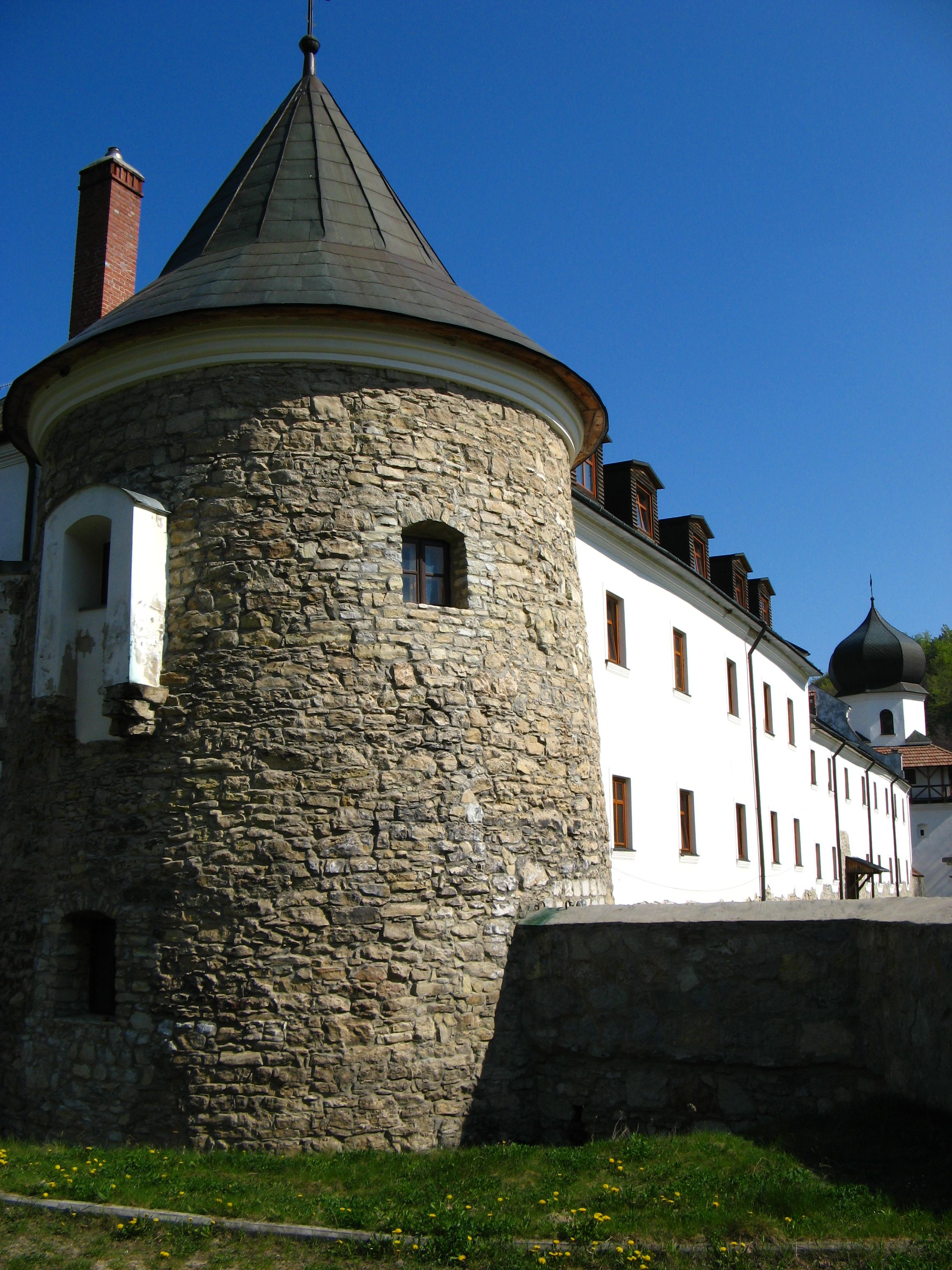
Round tower

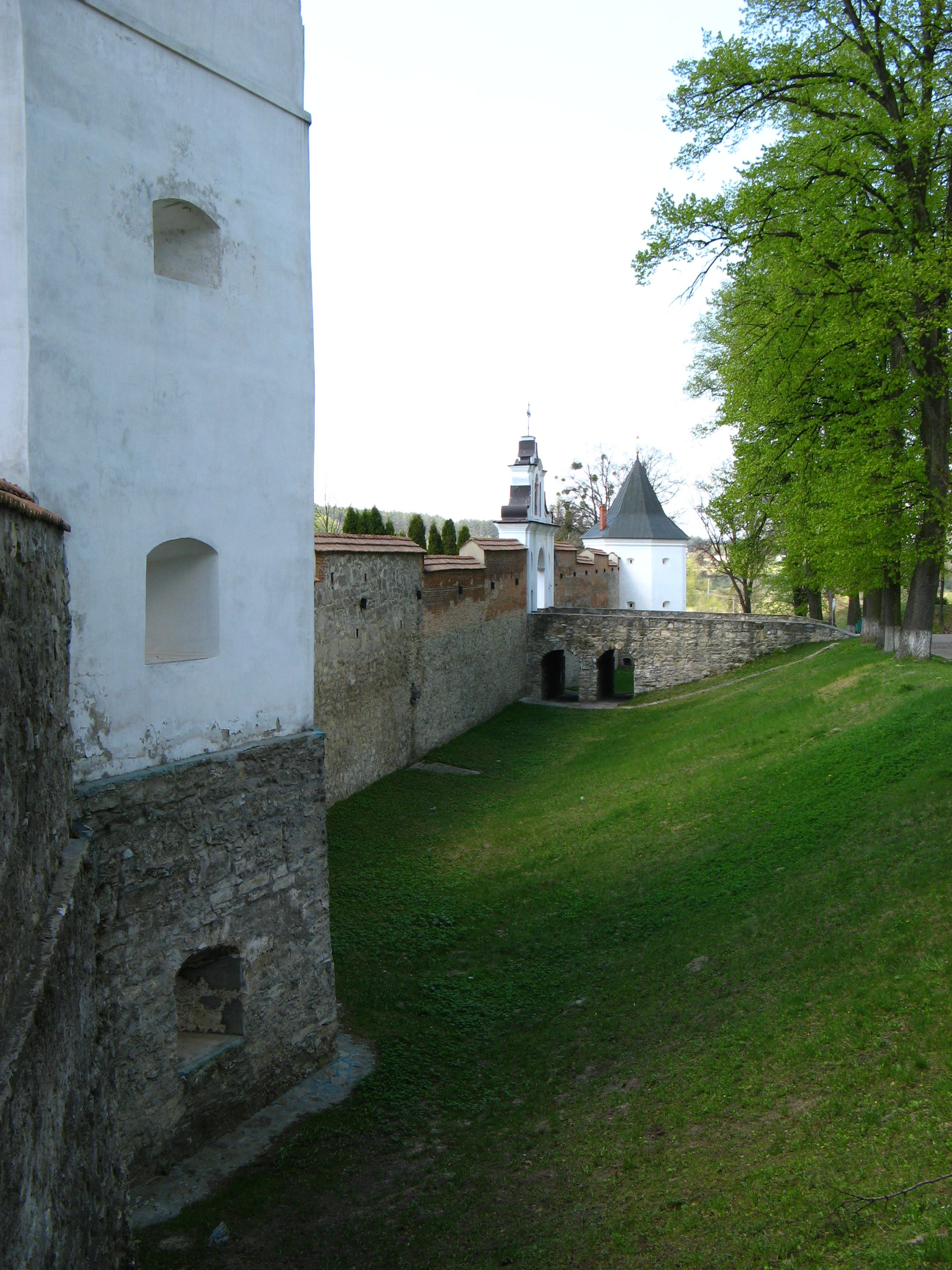
View of the main entrance

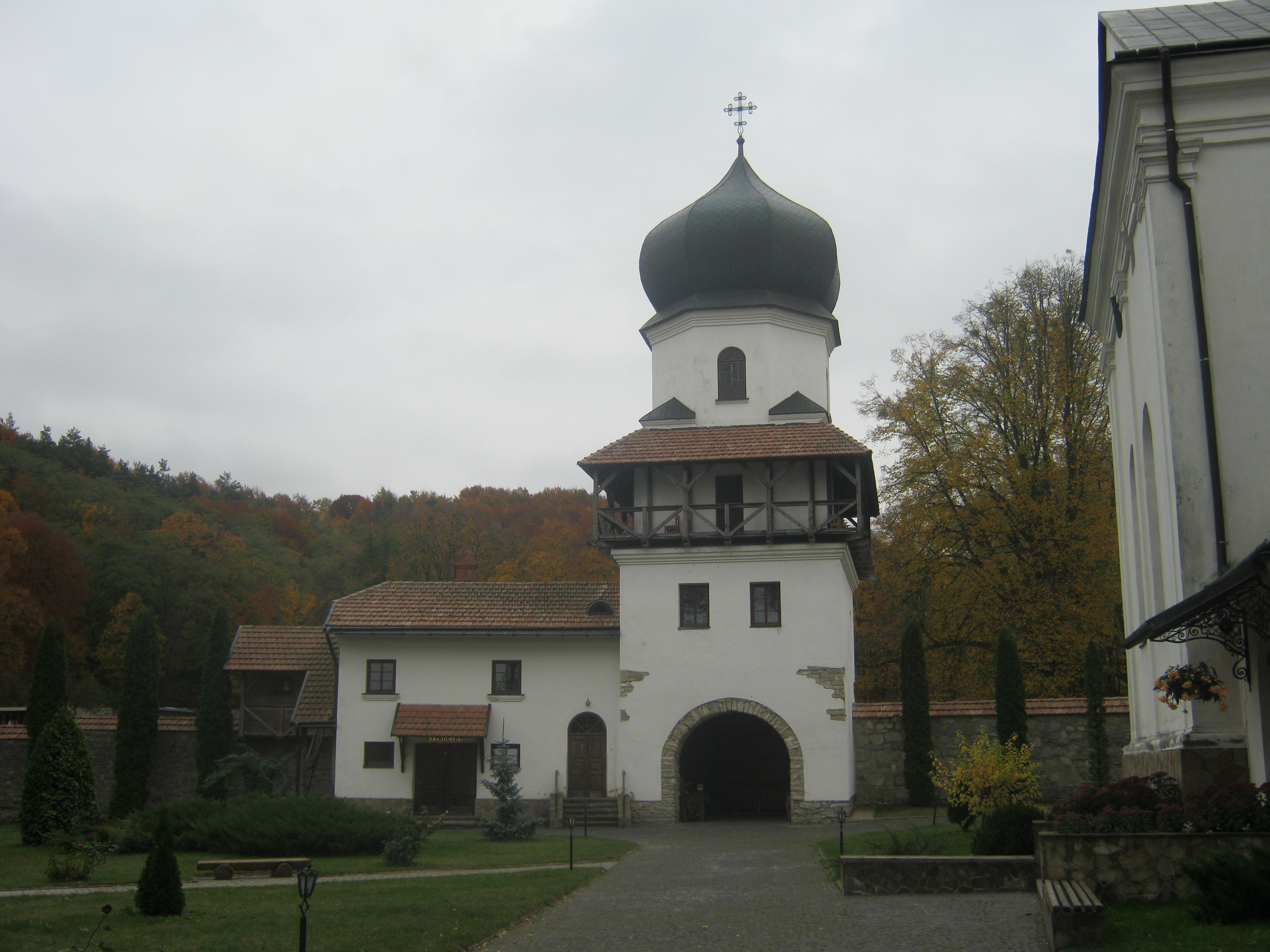
Gate tower

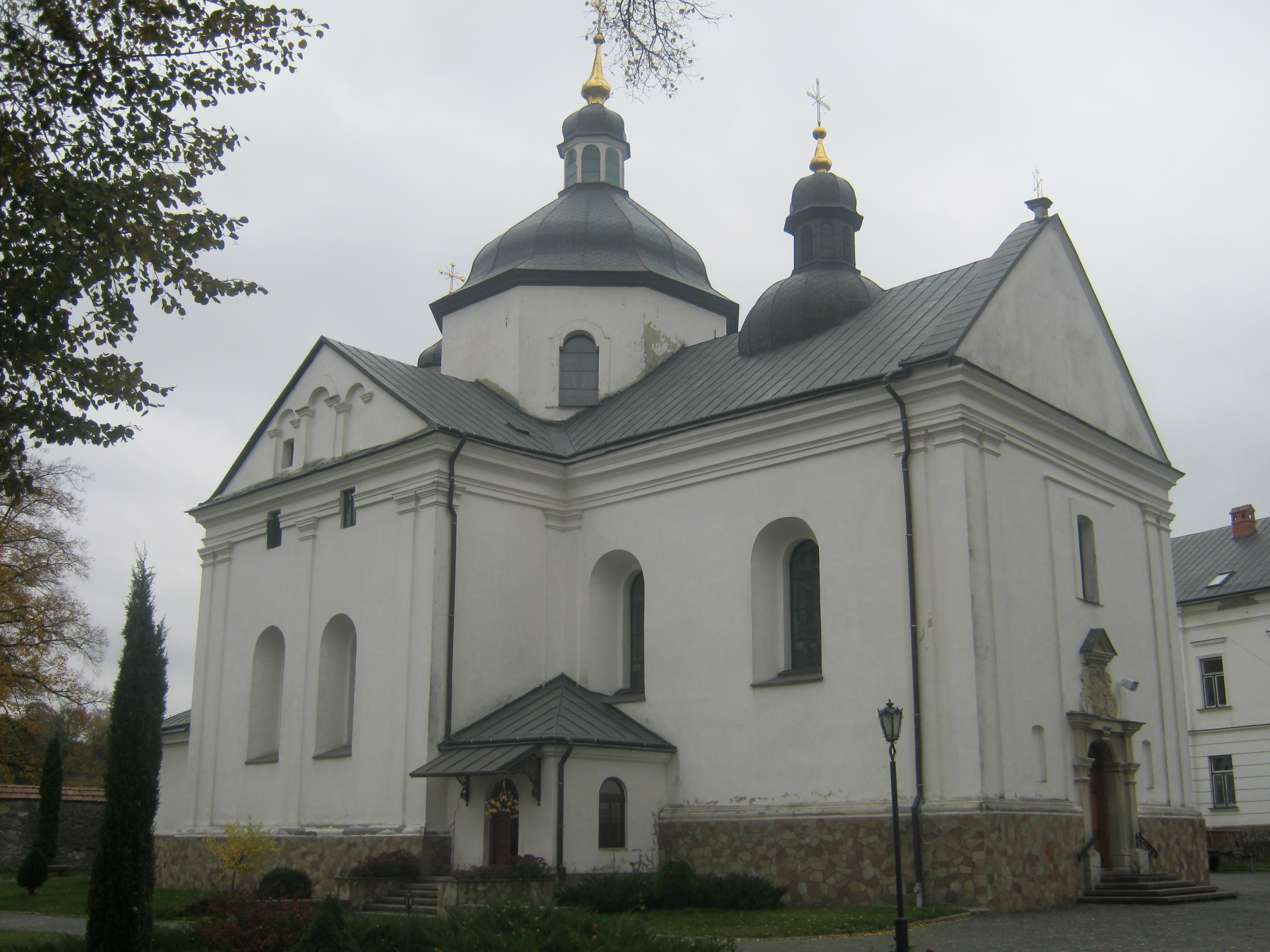
Church of the Transfiguration

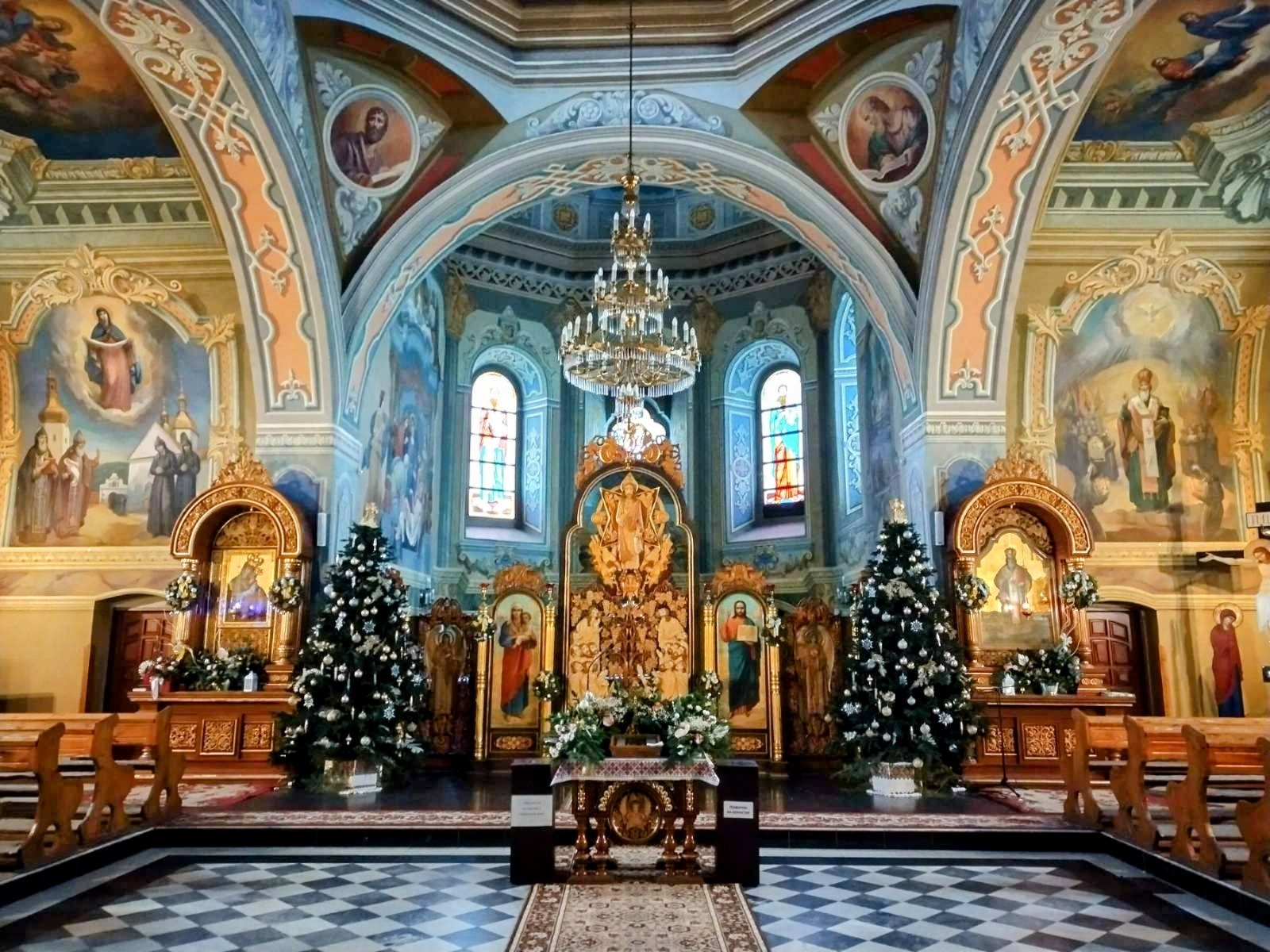
The main iconostasis of the Church of the Transfiguration

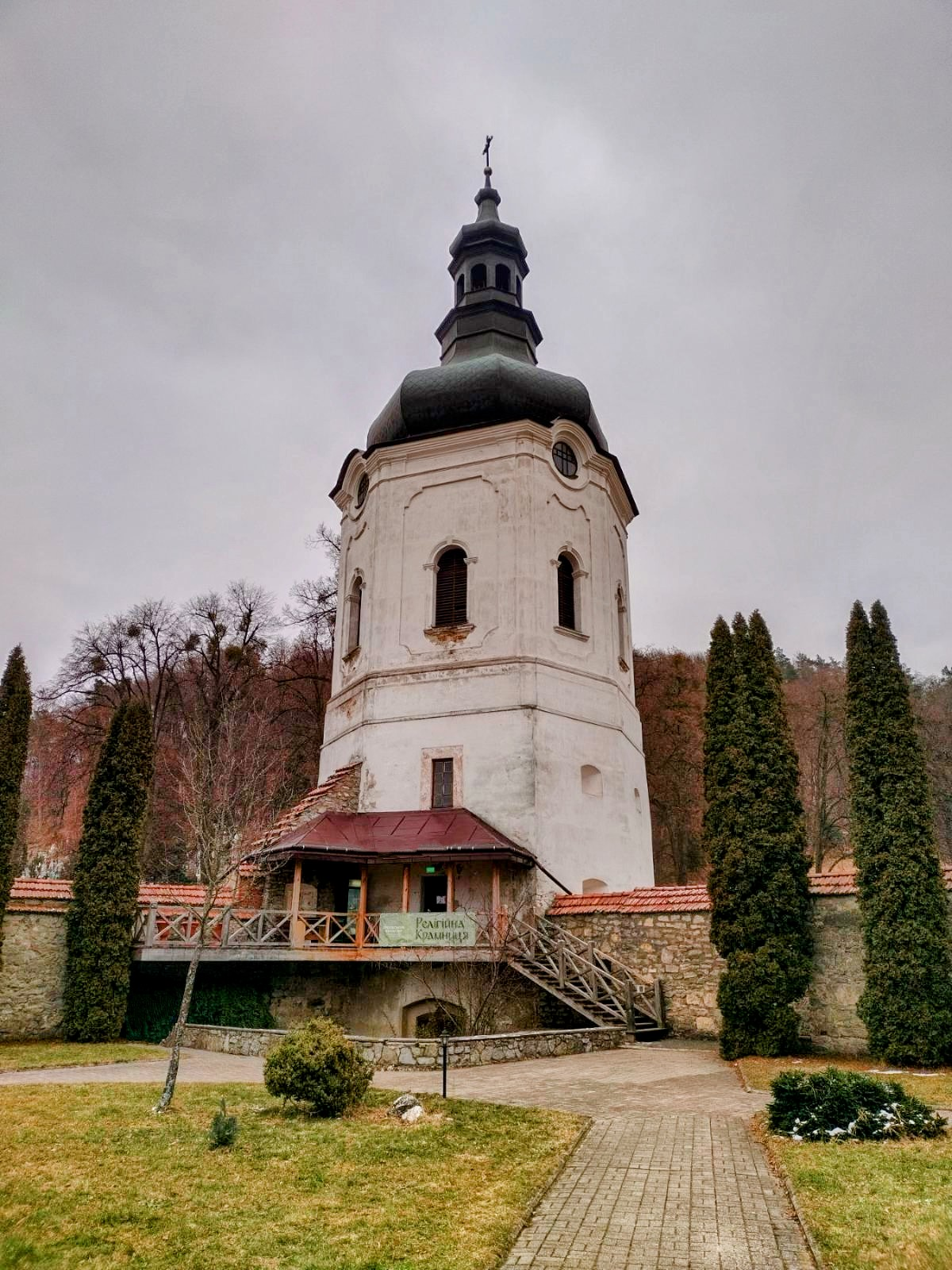
Upper tower

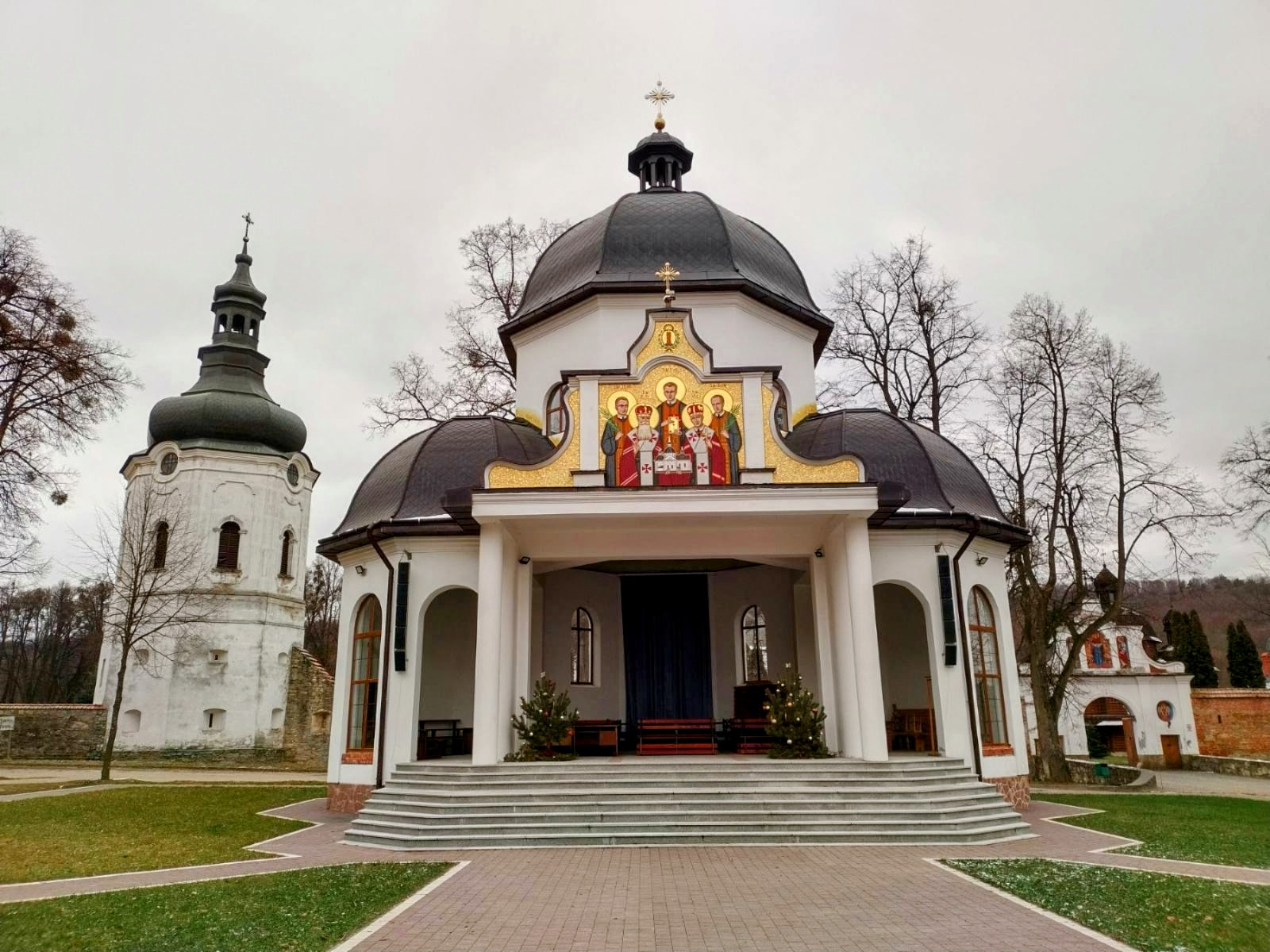
Chapel near the main entrance

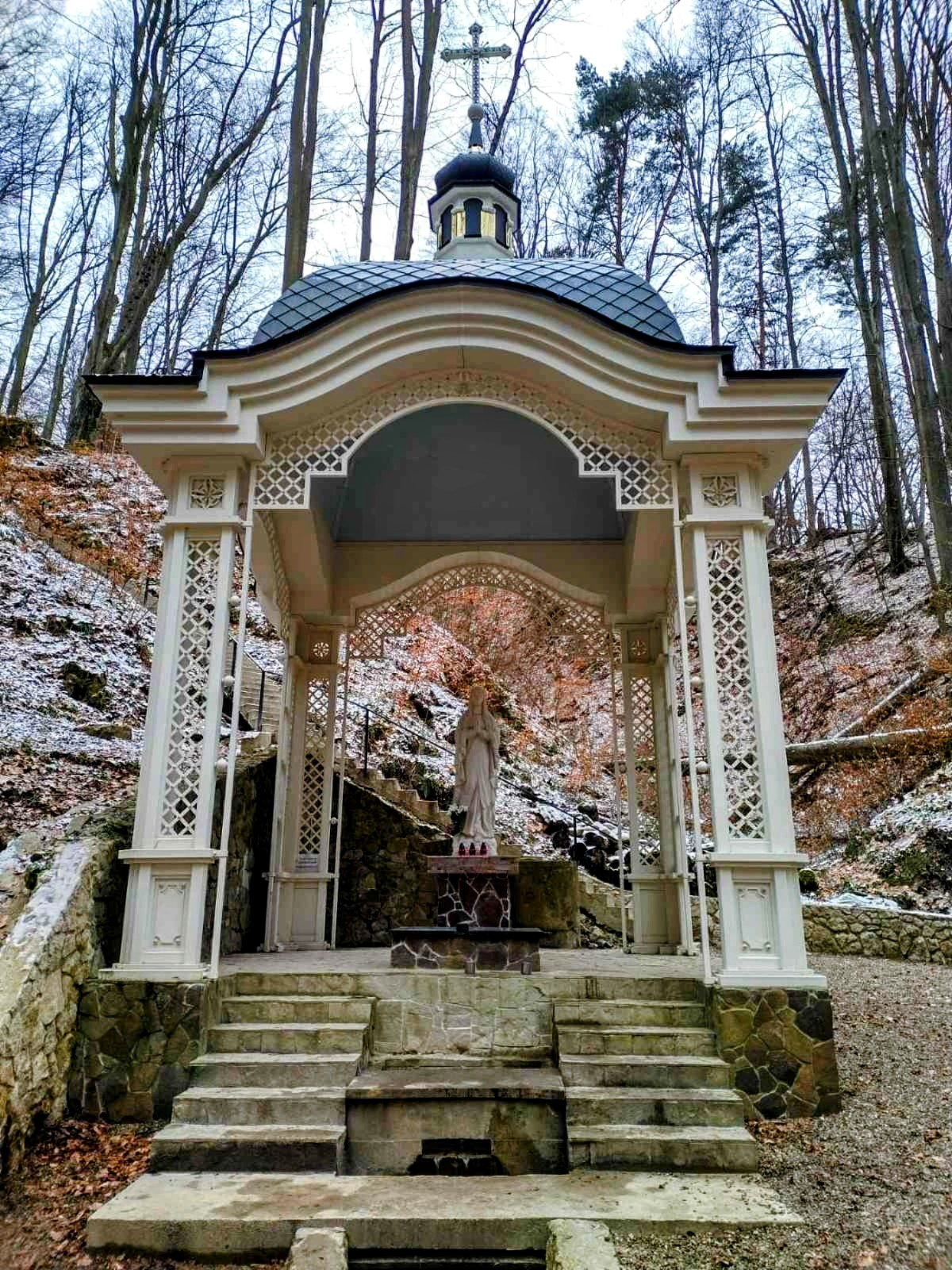
Chapel of the Blessed Virgin Mary at the spring

== Bibliography ==
- "Krechów". Geographical Dictionary of the Kingdom of Poland (in Polish). 4. Warszawa: Kasa im. Józefa Mianowskiego. 1883. p. 654.
