= Krasivka, Ternopil Oblast =

Rural locality in Ternopil Oblast, Ukraine

Krasivka Красівка
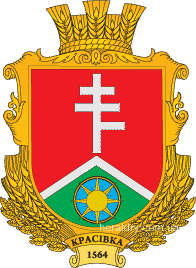
- Coat of arms

- Location in Ternopil Oblast
- Coordinates: 49°29′30″N 25°43′46″E
- Country: Ukraine
- Oblast: Ternopil Oblast
- Raion: Ternopil Raion
- Hromada: Velyki Hayi rural hromada
- Time zone: UTC+2 (EET)
  - Summer (DST): UTC+3 (EEST)
- Postal code: 47714

Krasivka (Ukrainian: Красівка) is a village in Velyki Hayi rural hromada, Ternopil Raion, Ternopil Oblast, Ukraine.

== History ==
The first written mention of the village was in 1564.

== Religion ==
- Church of the Intercession (1992, brick).

== Sources ==
- (in Ukrainian) Мельничук Б., Уніят В., Красівка // Ternopil Encyclopedic Dictionary: in 4 v. / editorial board: H. Yavorskyi and other, Ternopil: "Zbruch", 2005, V. 2: К—О, S. 217. — ISBN 966-528-199-2.
- "Krasówka". Geographical Dictionary of the Kingdom of Poland (in Polish). 4. Warszawa: Kasa im. Józefa Mianowskiego. 1883. p. 646.
