= Velyki Hayi rural hromada =

Rural hromada in Ternopil Oblast, Ukraine

Velyki Hayi rural hromada Великогаївська сільська громада
- hromada
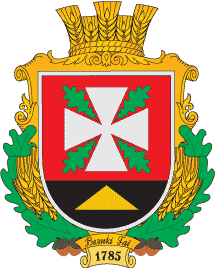
- Seal

- Location within Ternopil Oblast Location within Ukraine
- Coordinates: 49°31′10″N 25°38′39″E
- Country: Ukraine
- Oblast: Ternopil Oblast
- Raion: Ternopil Raion
- Administrative center: Velyki Hayi

Government
  - Hromada head: Oleh Kokhman

Area
  - Total: 141 km^{2} (54 sq mi)

Population (2022)
  - Total: 11,133
- Villages: 15
- Website: velykogaivska-gromada.gov.ua

Velyki Hayi rural territorial hromada (Ukrainian: Великогаївська територіальна громада, romanized: Velykohaivska silska terytorialna hromada) is a hromada in Ukraine, in Ternopil Raion of Ternopil Oblast. The administrative center is the village of Velyki Hayi. Its population is 11,133 (2022 estimate)

It was formed on 21 July 2015 by amalgamation of Bavoriv, Velyki Hayi, Hrabovets, Dychkiv, Kozivka, Skomorokhy, Tovstoluh rural councils of Ternopil Raion.

== Settlements ==
The hromada consists of 15 villages:

- Bavoriv
- Biloskirka
- Velyki Hayi
- Hrabovets
- Dychkiv
- Zastavie
- Zastinka
- Kypiachka
- Kozivka
- Krasivka
- Proshova
- Skomorokhy
- Smolianka
- Teofilivka
- Tovstoluh
