= Dychkiv =

Rural locality in Ternopil Oblast, Ukraine

Dychkiv Дичків
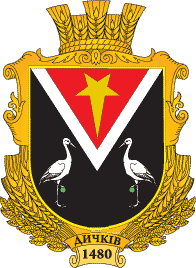
- Coat of arms

- Location in Ternopil Oblast
- Coordinates: 49°30′25″N 25°43′40″E
- Country: Ukraine
- Oblast: Ternopil Oblast
- Raion: Ternopil Raion
- Hromada: Velyki Hayi rural hromada
- Time zone: UTC+2 (EET)
  - Summer (DST): UTC+3 (EEST)
- Postal code: 47738

Dychkiv (Ukrainian: Дичків) is a village in Velyki Hayi rural hromada, Ternopil Raion, Ternopil Oblast, Ukraine.

== History ==
The first written mention of the village was in 1480.

== Religion ==
- Church of the Transfiguration (1903; brick).

== Sources ==
- (in Ukrainian) Гаврилюк О., Уніят В., Дичків // Ternopil Encyclopedic Dictionary: in 4 v. / editorial board: H. Yavorskyi and other, Ternopil: "Zbruch", 2004, V. 1: А—Й, S. 479. — ISBN 966-528-197-6.
- "Dyczków". Geographical Dictionary of the Kingdom of Poland (in Polish). 2. Warszawa: Kasa im. Józefa Mianowskiego. 1881. p. 242.
