= Proshova =

Rural locality in Ternopil Oblast, Ukraine

Proshova Прошова
- Location in Ternopil Oblast
- Coordinates: 49°24′57″N 25°40′59″E
- Country: Ukraine
- Oblast: Ternopil Oblast
- Raion: Ternopil Raion
- Hromada: Velyki Hayi rural hromada
- Time zone: UTC+2 (EET)
  - Summer (DST): UTC+3 (EEST)
- Postal code: 47744

Proshova (Ukrainian: Прошова) is a village in Velyki Hayi rural hromada, Ternopil Raion, Ternopil Oblast, Ukraine.

== History ==
The first written mention of the village was in 1574.

== Religion ==
- Church of the Assumption (1700, brick, UGCC),
- church (1934, dilapidated, RCC).

== Sources ==
- "Proszowa". Geographical Dictionary of the Kingdom of Poland (in Polish). 9. Warszawa: Kasa im. Józefa Mianowskiego. 1888. p. 64.
