= Bavoriv Castle =

Castle in Bavoriv, Ternopil Oblast, Ukraine

- Баворівський замок
- Interactive map of the Bavoriv Castle area

General information
- Location: Bavoriv, Ternopil Raion, Ternopil Oblast, Ukraine
- Coordinates: 49°26′24″N 25°43′02″E

The Bavoriv Castle (Ukrainian: Баворівський замок, romanized: Bavorivskyi zamok) is a located in Bavoriv, Ternopil Oblast, Ukraine. The wooden castle was located on a hill, above the Hnizna River.

== History ==
The stronghold was built in the 16th century by Wacław Bawor, a courtier to King Sigismund I the Old and a field scribe of the crown. In 1589, Tartars besieging the defensive castle suffered a memorable defeat. In the 17th century the fortress was rebuilt. The next owners of the castle and lands were the Małecki family. Around 1800 the castle was abandoned and began to fall into disrepair.

== Palace ==
In 1851, the estate was bought from the Małecki family by Count Wiktor Baworowski. Since the castle was no longer habitable, he built a new palace, where he gathered a collection of artworks and a rich book collection. Victor Count Baworowski was also the founder of the Baworowscy Library in Lviv. When Count Baworowski committed suicide in 1894 the estate passed into foreign hands. In the interwar years they belonged to the Astana family, among others. By the end of the 19th century, only ruins remained of the castle.

== Architecture ==
In the 17th century, the brick castle was a defensive structure, founded on a rectangular plan with an inner courtyard. The residential buildings were three-story. The entrance to the fortress led through a gate in the gateway building, the two corners of which had round, three-story towers topped with a helmet. Similar towers were on the other buildings. The castle also had a castle chapel, which in 1747 was rebuilt as the Roman Catholic Church of St. Wenceslas, and at the turn of the 20th century was in turn turned into the Orthodox Church of St. John the Baptist. The Baworowskis were buried in the crypt of the Roman Catholic church. Today almost nothing remains of the castle. The rebuilt Roman Catholic church shows the area of the former fortifications. Of the old Roman Catholic castle church, only the lower part with a semicircular apse survived, existing in the later church.
