= Jan Rajewski =

Polish mathematician and professor

Jan Rajewski (14 May 1857 – 30/31 December 1906) was a professor of the University of Lviv. He was a mathematician.
