= Antoni Łomnicki =

Polish mathematician (1881–1941)

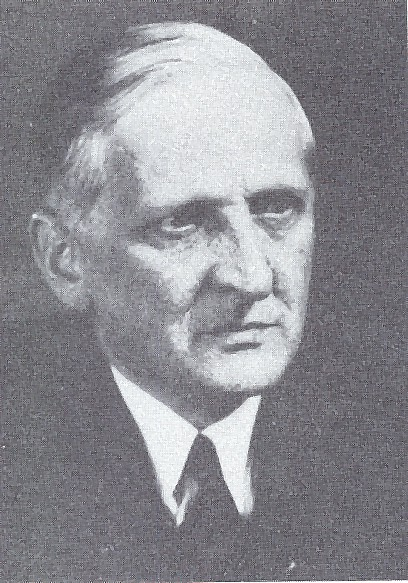
- Born: 17 January 1881; Lwów
- Died: 4 July 1941 (aged 60); Lwów
- Education: Jan Kazimierz University in Lwów
- Scientific career
- Fields: Mathematics

Antoni Marian Łomnicki (17 January 1881 – 4 July 1941) was a Polish mathematician. He contributed to applied mathematics and cartography. He was the author of several textbooks of mathematics and was an influential mathematics teacher at the University of Lwów.

== Life and work ==
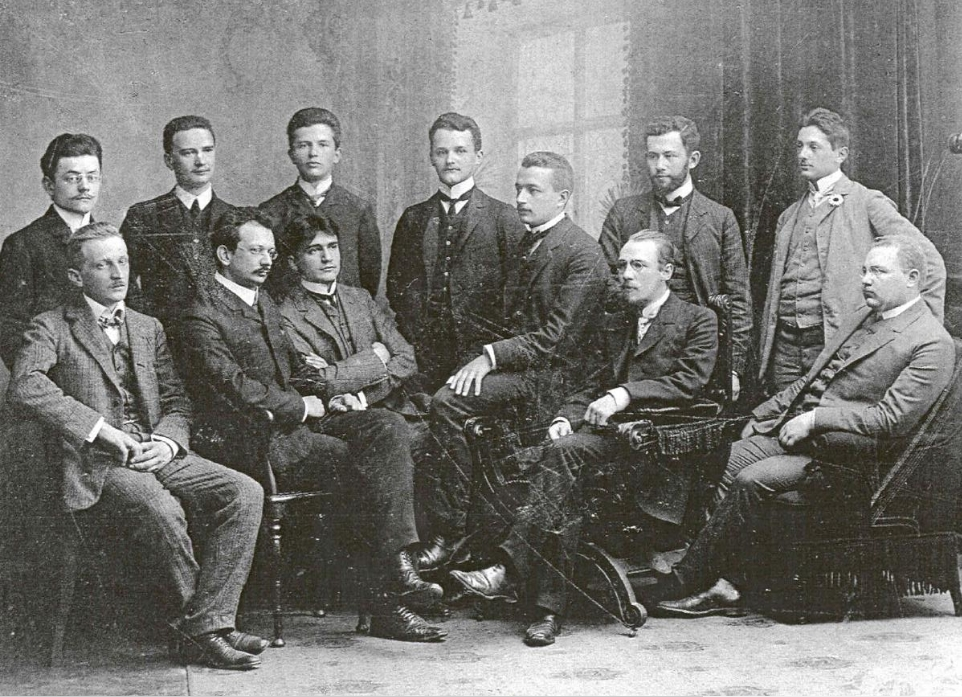
Polish researchers in 1907. Sitting left to right: Antoni Łomnicki (1881–1941), Werner, Antoni Przeborski (1871–1941), Tadeusz Banachiewicz (1882–1954), Wacław Sierpiński (1882–1969) and Kazimierz Józef Horowicz (1884–1920). Standing left to right: Szulc, Jan Króo - physicist, Stanisław Kępiński (1867–1908), Władysław Dziewulski (1878–1962) – astronomer and astrophysicist, Włodzimierz Stożek (1883–1941) and Hugo Dionizy Steinhaus (1887–1972)

Antoni Łomnicki was born in Lwów, the son of Marian Łomnicki. He was educated at the Lviv's IV Gymnasium, Jan Kazimierz University in Lwów in Poland (1899–1903). His teachers included Józef Puzyna, Jan Rajewski, Stanisław Kępiński, Marian Smoluchowski, and Kazimierz Twardowski. He passed the teachers exam in 1903 and received a government scholarship in 1906 to study at the University of Göttingen where he attended lectures by David Hilbert, Felix Klein, H. Minkovsky, and others. He taught at the 7th Gymnasium in Lviv and from 1913 at the Lviv Polytechnic School. In 1918–19 he took part in the Polish-Ukrainian war. In 1920 he became professor of the Lwów University of Technology and taught for the next twenty years. He was part of the Lwów school of mathematics and influenced many other mathematicians including Stefan Banach, Kazimierz Kuratowski, Stanisław Stożek, Antoni Nikliborc, Stefan Kaczmarz, Władysław Orlicz, and Stanisław Mazur. In 1938, he became a member of the Warsaw Scientific Society (TNW). He worked on probability, calculus, statistics and mathematical cartography and wrote on the teaching of mathematics. His major works included Kartografia matematyczna (Warszawa 1927). Łomnicki was arrested on July 3, 1941 by the invading Nazi Germans during the Second World War and shot along with several other professors (see Massacre of Lwów professors) the next day on the Wzgórza Wuleckie in Lwów.

In December 1944 Stefan Banach wrote the following tribute to Łomnicki:

A native of Lwów, he worked for over twenty years as a mathematics professor at the Lwów University of Technology. He prepared hundreds of engineers for their profession. I was his assistant. He was the first to instil in me the importance and responsibility of a professor’s task. He was an unrivalled educator, one of the best I ever knew. He was the author of many popular schoolbooks as well as textbooks on advanced analysis for technologists, surpassing in quality those published abroad. His work in the field of cartography was at a high level. Equally effective were his teaching and pedagogic efforts. Professor Łomnicki had tremendous energy and a great work ethic.
