= Marian Łomnicki =

Polish geologist, zoologist, paleontologist and encyclopedist

Marian Alojzy Łomnicki
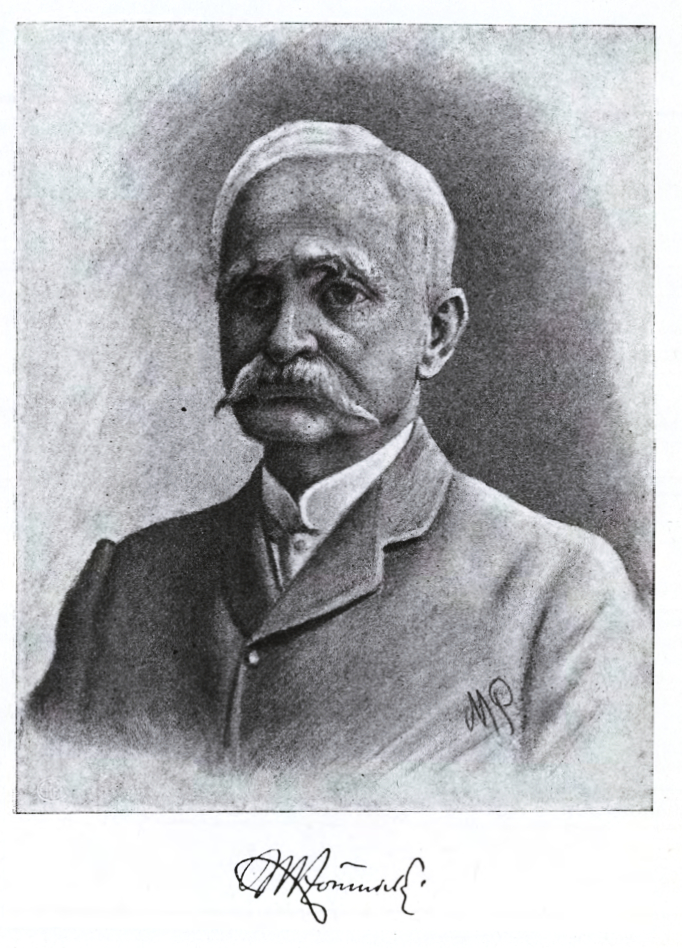
- Born: 9 September 1845; Baworów, Ternopil region, Austrian Empire
- Died: 26 October 1915 (aged 70); Lemberg, Austria-Hungary
- Education: Jagiellonian University, University of Vienna
- Known for: Geological atlas of Galicia, descriptions of Miocene of Podolia, ammonite Pachydiscus stanislaopolitanus
- Spouse: Maria Szczucka
- Children: Antoni Marian Łomnicki, Jarosław Łomnicki
- Awards: Knight of the Order of Franz Joseph
- Scientific career
- Fields: Geology, zoology, paleontology
- Workplaces: Jagiellonian University, University of Vienna, Lviv Gymnasium, Dzieduszycki Museum
- Doctoral advisor: Eduard Suess, Rudolf Kner

Marian Alojzy Łomnicki (9 September 1845 – 26 October 1915) was a Polish geologist, zoologist, paleontologist and encyclopedist. His son Antoni Marian Łomnicki became a mathematician, while another son Jarosław Łomnicki became an entomologist.

== Life and work ==
Łomnicki was born in Baworów, Austrian Empire (now Bavoriv, Ternopil Oblast, Ukraine), where his parents Jakub and Magdalena née Borkowski belonged to impoverished noble family of Suchekomnaty. The wilderness around the region made him interested in nature at an early age. At the Lviv gymnasium he took an interest in science. In 1858, Maksymilian Nowicki became a teacher there and Nowicki began to collaborate with Włodzimierz Dzieduszycki. Nowicki also introduced Łomnicki to geology through Seweryn Płachetka. Other influences included the botanist Władysław Tyniecki. Łomnicki received a scholarship from Włodzimierz Dzieduszycki and studied at the Jagiellonian University in Krakow from 1867 to 1868 and then at the University of Vienna. In Vienna he studied geology under Eduard Suess and paleontology under Rudolf Kner. He then qualified as a secondary school teacher and began to teach a year at the Franciszek Józef gymnasium Lviv Gymnasium and then at Stanisławów for nine years before returning to Lviv in 1879. He spent the next 25 years teaching at the 4th gymnasium. He collected insects through his life. From 1878 he also lectured at the school of agriculture in Dublany. He examined the Miocene of Podolia. He described the ammonite Pachydiscus stanislaopolitanus in 1871 from the Cretaceous near Stanisławów. He contributed to the geological atlas of Galicia and published two book on zoology. From 1905 he was curator at the Dzieduszycki museum. In 1912 he received an honorary doctorate from the Franciscan University in Lviv.

Łomnicki was decorated Knight of the Order of Franz Joseph. Łomnicki's wife Maria Szczucka was an activist who had been involved in nationalist movements. He died in Lviv and was buried in the Łyczakowski cemetery.
