= Adam Łomnicki =

Polish evolutionary biologist and ecologist (1935–2021)

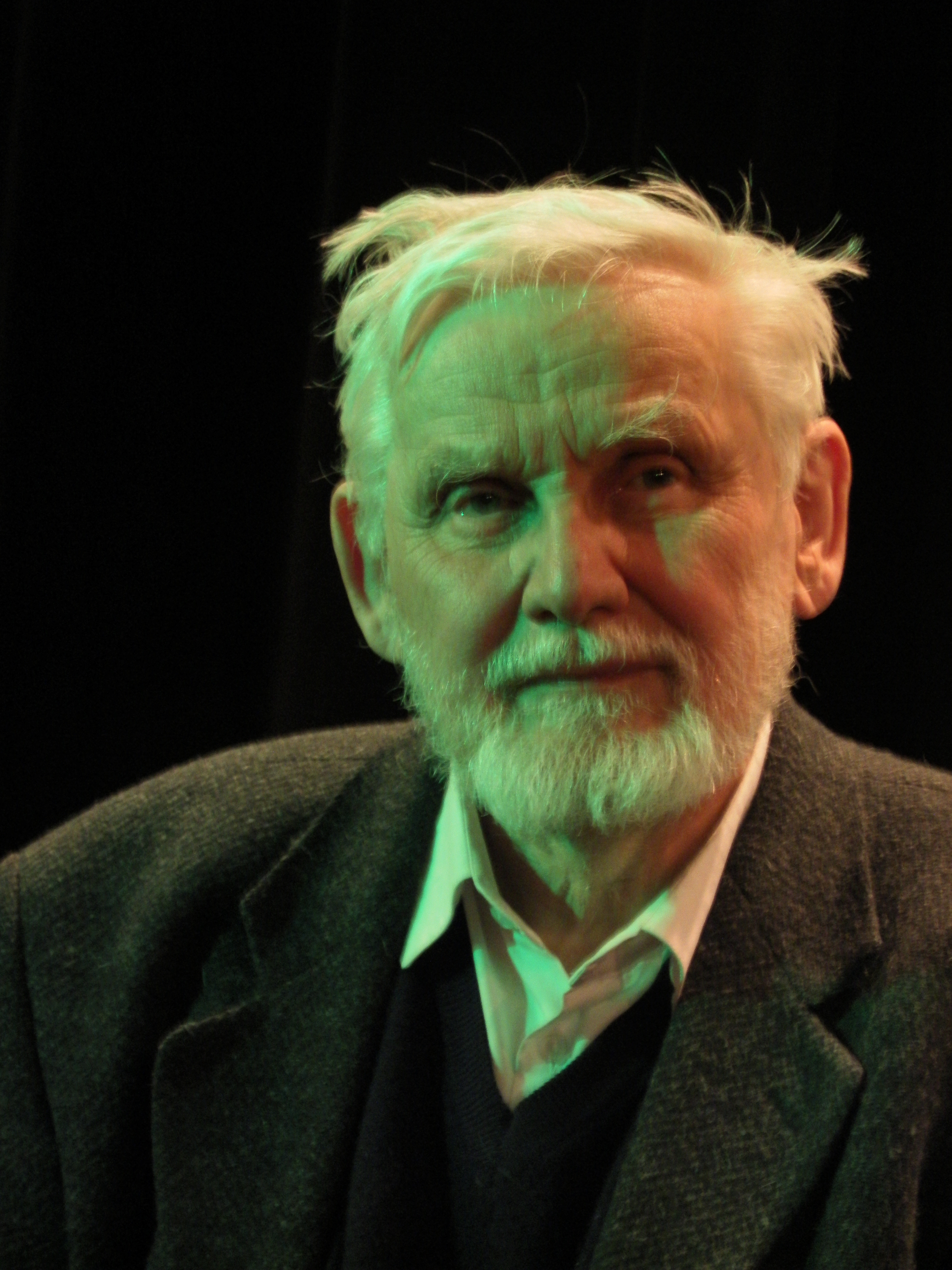
- Łomnicki in 2013
- Born: 28 June 1935; Warsaw, Poland
- Died: 15 December 2021 (aged 86)
- Citizenship: Polish
- Occupations: Evolutionary biologist Ecologist

Adam Łomnicki (28 June 1935 – 15 December 2021) was a Polish evolutionary biologist and ecologist, a member of Polish Academy of Sciences, Polish Academy of Learning and Academia Europaea, professor of Mammal Research Institute of the Polish Academy of Sciences.

== Biography ==
Łomnicki graduated in biology from the Jagiellonian University. He received his PhD from zoology and ecology in 1961, since 1981 he is a professor. In his scientific research he worked on levels of natural selection, stability and its evolutionary constraints, individual-based approach in ecology, intra-population variability, laboratory populations and nature conservation.

He was awarded with a Knight's Cross of the Order of Polonia Restituta.

Łomnicki died on 15 December 2021, at the age of 86.
