= Krekhiv =

Krekhiv Крехів
- Village
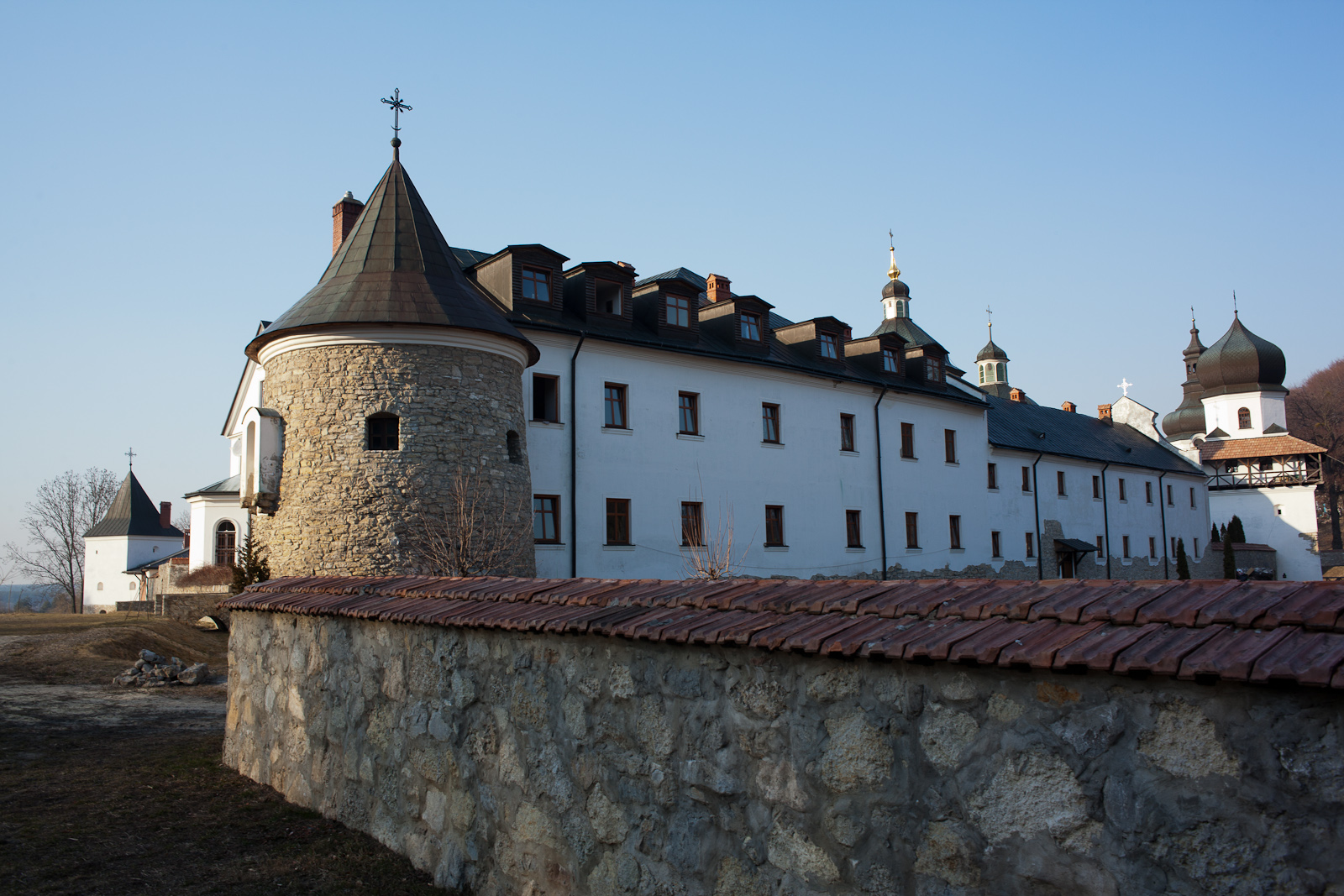
- Krekhiv Monastery

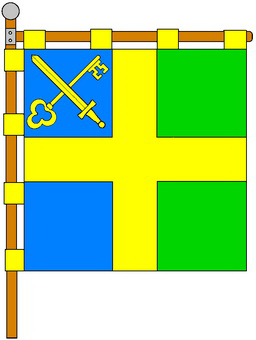
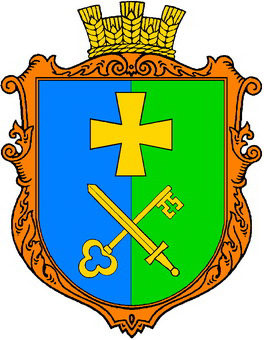
- Flag Coat of arms

- Location within Ukraine
- Coordinates: 50°2′56″N 23°48′43″E
- Country: Ukraine
- Oblast: Lviv Oblast
- Raion: Lviv

Area
  - Total: 18.14 km^{2} (7.00 sq mi)
- Elevation: 246 m (807 ft)

Population
  - Total: 798
  - Density: 44.0/km^{2} (114/sq mi)
- Time zone: UTC+2 (EET)
  - Summer (DST): UTC+3 (EEST)
- Postal code: 80352

Krekhiv (Ukrainian: Крехів, Polish: Krechów) is a village in Lviv Raion, Lviv Oblast of Ukraine, located within the densely forested Roztochia Upland about 10 km west of Zhovkva and 50 km north of Lviv. It belongs to Zhovkva urban hromada, one of the hromadas of Ukraine. The village is famous for its Basilian monastery which is a popular pilgrimage site.

The monastery was established in the 16th century by two monks from the Kyiv Pechersk Lavra, Joel and Silvester, who settled in nearby caves. Around 1612 or 1618 the owner of Zhovkva, Stanisław Żółkiewski offered the monks land to build their monastery, later surrounded with fortifications during the second half of the 17th century to defend it from roaming Tatar hordes. In the 18th century the monastery's prosperity rose and wooden buildings were replaced with stone ones which stand there today. At the beginning of the 19th century, it suffered from the policies of Austrian emperor Joseph, however by the end of the century it was one of the main centers of the rebirth of Ukrainian monasticism.

The hardest time for Krekhiv came with the advent of Soviet occupation in 1939; by 1949 the monastery was closed and many of the monks were martyred in Soviet prisons while others had to live undercover. With the collapse of the Soviet Union, the monastery was reopened on 29 August 1990 and the complex has undergone a thorough renovation.

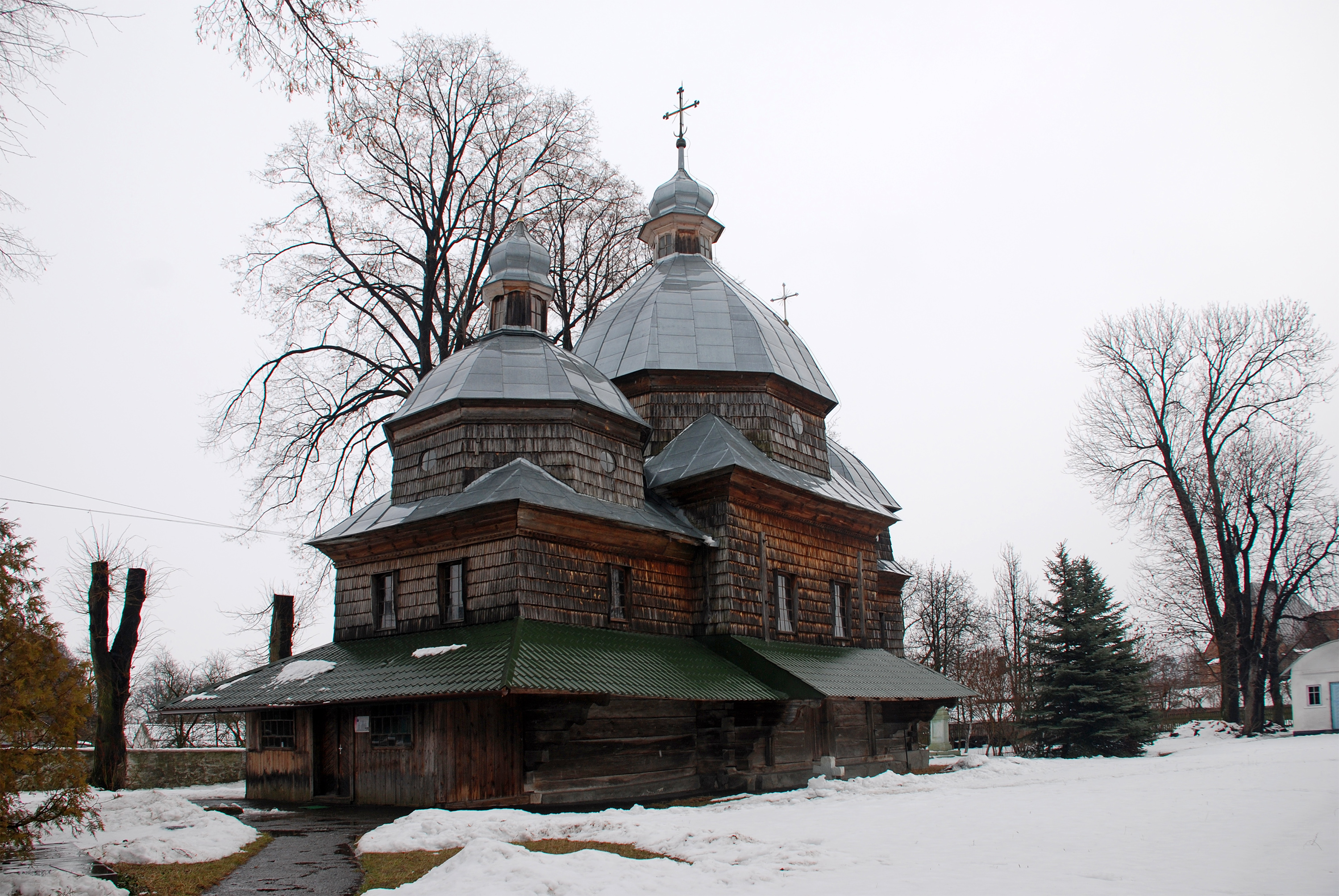
Wooden church of St. Paraskeva

The monastery is known for its miracle working icons of the Mother of God and of St. Nicholas. The largest annual pilgrimage to Krekhiv is held on the Feast of the Translation of St. Nicholas on May 22 (May 9 according to the Julian calendar).

Until 18 July 2020, Krekhiv belonged to Zhovkva Raion. The raion was abolished in July 2020 as part of the administrative reform of Ukraine, which reduced the number of raions of Lviv Oblast to seven. The area of Zhovkva Raion was merged into Lviv Raion.
