= Lomnička (Brno-Country District) =

- Municipality
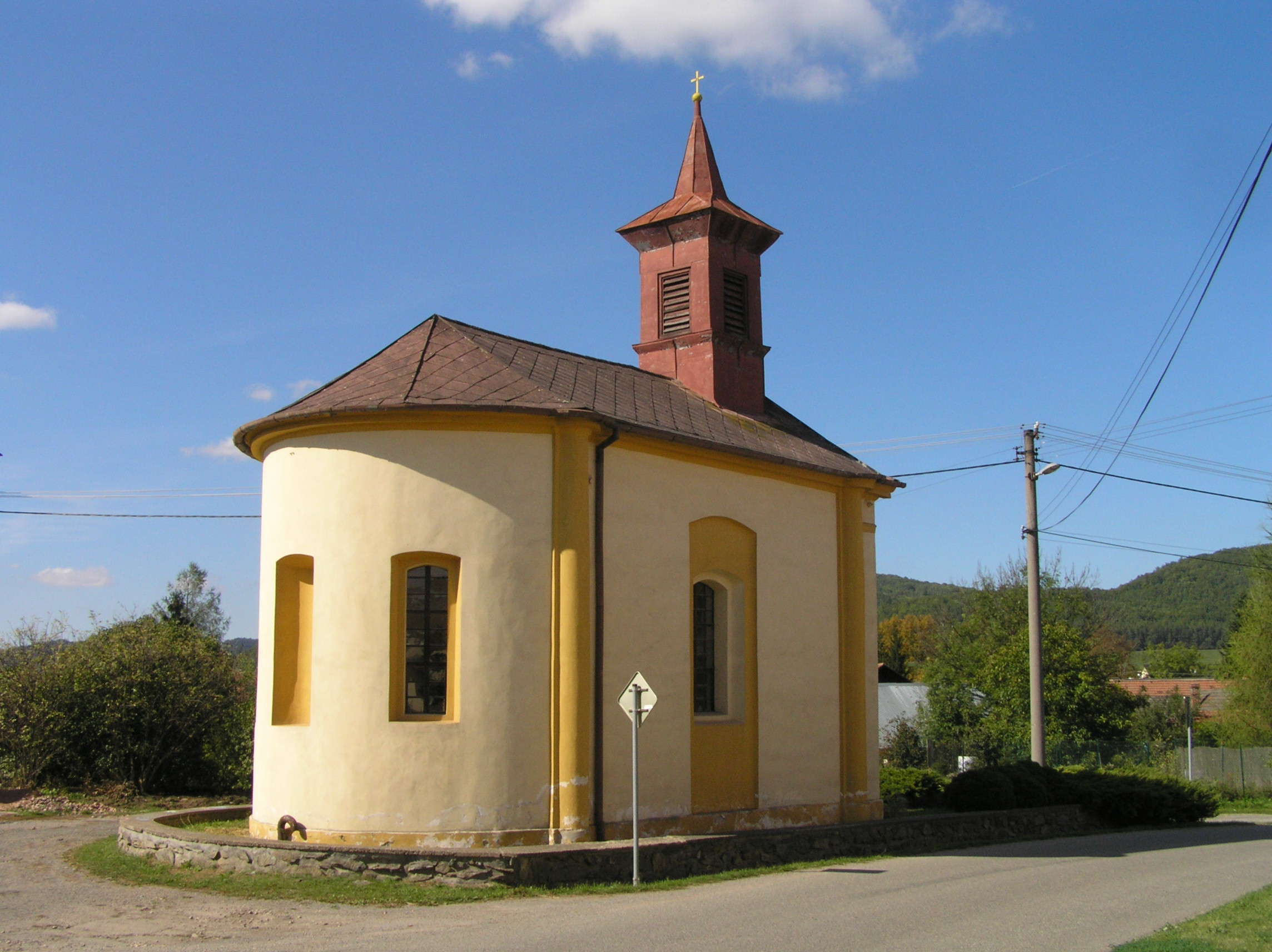
- Chapel of Saint Frederick

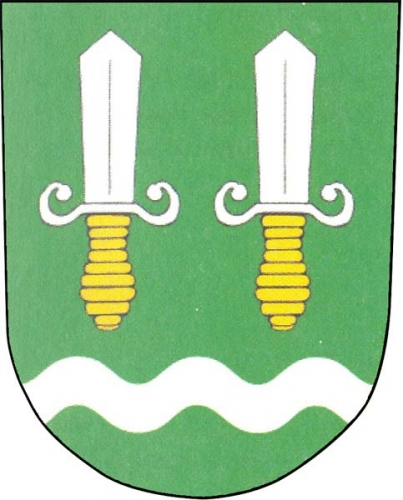
- Flag Coat of arms

- Location in the Czech Republic
- Coordinates: 49°22′1″N 16°25′53″E
- Country: Czech Republic
- Region: South Moravian
- District: Brno-Country
- First mentioned: 1235

Area
  - Total: 6.33 km^{2} (2.44 sq mi)
- Elevation: 277 m (909 ft)

Population (2026-01-01)
  - Total: 604
  - Density: 95.4/km^{2} (247/sq mi)
- Time zone: UTC+1 (CET)
  - Summer (DST): UTC+2 (CEST)
- Postal code: 666 01
- Website: www.lomnicka.cz

Lomnička is a municipality and village in Brno-Country District in the South Moravian Region of the Czech Republic. It has about 600 inhabitants.

== Geography ==
Lomnička is located about 20 kilometres (12 mi) northwest of Brno. Most of the municipal territory lies in the Boskovice Furrow, only the forested areas in the north lies in the Upper Svratka Highlands. The highest point is the hill Kopanina at 462 m (1,516 ft) above sea level. The Besének Stream flows through the town.

== History ==
The first written mention of Lomnička is from 1235, when the village was donated to the Porta coeli Convent in Předklášteří. The convent owned Lomnička until the convent's abolishment in 1782. In 1789, Lomnička was acquired by the merchant Jan Homoláč at auction.

== Demographics ==
Historical population

Year	Pop.	±%
1869	456	—
1880	405	−11.2%
1890	449	+10.9%
1900	359	−20.0%
1910	391	+8.9%

Year	Pop.	±%
1921	408	+4.3%
1930	371	−9.1%
1950	419	+12.9%
1961	439	+4.8%
1970	436	−0.7%

Year	Pop.	±%
1980	376	−13.8%
1991	338	−10.1%
2001	374	+10.7%
2011	512	+36.9%
2021	562	+9.8%

Source: Censuses

== Transport ==
There are no railways or major roads passing through the municipality.

== Sights ==
The main landmark of Lomnička is the Chapel of Saint Frederick. It was built in the Historicist style in 1852, on the site of an older Baroque chapel from 1756.
