= Kolonia Łomnicka =

- Village
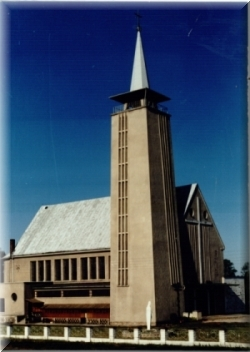
- Catholic church

- Location within Poland
- Coordinates: 50°48′N 18°28′E
- Country: Poland
- Voivodeship: Opole
- County: Olesno
- Gmina: Olesno
- Population (31.12.2015): 267

Kolonia Łomnicka [kɔˈlɔɲa wɔmˈnit͡ska] is a village in the administrative district of Gmina Olesno, within Olesno County, Opole Voivodeship, in south-western Poland.
