= Castles of Ternopil Oblast National Reserve =

National Architecture-Historical Reserve in Ternopil Oblast, Ukraine

Coordinates: 49°39′41.8″N 25°46′47.7″E

The main castles of the Castles of Ternopil National Reserve within Ternopil Oblast

The Castles of Ternopil Oblast National Reserve (Ukrainian: Національний заповідник «Замки Тернопілля», romanized: Natsionalnyi zapovidnyk "Zamky Ternopillia") is a National Architecture-Historical Reserve located in Ternopil Oblast, Ukraine. The reserve is based in Zbarazh since its formation in 2005 based on a smaller regional reserve that had existed since 1994.

== Origins ==
In 1980, control of the Church of the Assumption of the Blessed Virgin Mary in Zbarazh was transferred to the local history museum. The museum’s director, Petro Voytyna, who was previously an education official, together with local history enthusiasts, laid the groundwork for the expanding museum, collecting and studying artifacts, and putting on exhibitions. From April 1982, the museum was a branch of Ternopil Oblast Museum, with the status of a state institution.

In February 1994, the State Historical and Architectural Reserve at Zbarazh was established, based on the Zbarazh Castle precinct, and with Anatoliy Matsigiura was as its first director. Within the 120 hectares (300 acres) reserve were the reconstructed castle, the remains of the 14th-century Staryi Zbarazh Castle, the Bernardine and Felician monasteries, the 17th-century Church of the Transfiguration of the Lord, and other churches and 19th-century administrative buildings. The site was transformed from what had been a youth cultural and sports centre into a tourist attraction. The Zbarazh District Local History Museum was later relocated to the castle.

In 1999, Vyshnivets Castle became part of the reserve. In December 2002, the Zbarazh Local History Museum were placed under the use of the State Historical and Architectural Reserve, and that year, the reserve was expanded to include Skalat Castle.

On 15 January 2005, the Reserve was granted National status, and was placed on the list of historic reserves in Ukraine. It was renamed the National Reserve "Castles of Ternopil".

== The work done by the Reserve ==
Since its foundation, the Reserve has continued the work of the Zbarazhsky District Museum, restoring the region's historical monuments and preserving its cultural heritage. Much of its work is centred on the main museum at Zbarazh Castle. The Reserve is one of the leaders of the tourism industry in the Ternopil region, and the castle is a prominent regional museum. Its collection of 11,000 objects includes portraits of historical figures, prints, manuscripts, religious objects, sacred art, coins, weapons, and embroidery, sculptures, and fabrics by Ukrainian artists.

The Reserve has scientific and restoration councils, a fund and procurement commission, a scientific library, and its own newspaper, Visnyk Istorii Krayu. Festivals and conferences have been held at the castle.

== Architectural landmarks ==
=== Castles ===
The Reserve contains a number of castles, most of which are in ruins:

- Zbarazh Castle (17th century), which also functions as a museum and houses over 35 exposition halls.
- Vyshnivets Castle (15th–16th centuries)
- Skalat Castle (17th century)
- Terebovlia Castle (17th century)
- Chortkiv Castle (17th century)
- Pidzamochok Castle (16th–17th centuries)
- Zolotyi Potik Castle (16th–17th centuries)
- Kryvche Castle (17th century)
- Yazlovets Castle (14th–17th centuries)
- Skala-Podilska Castle (16th–18th centuries)
- Mykulyntsi Castle (16th century)

=== Church of the Transfiguration ===
The Church of the Transfiguration of the Lord in Zaluzhzhia is also part of the reserve, although the land on which it is located belongs to the Zbarazh City Council. The reserve has made attempts to acquire the territory for permanent use in November 2024, February 2025, and March 2025 to ensure the territory's protection and later create an ethnographic museum on the site.

== Gallery ==
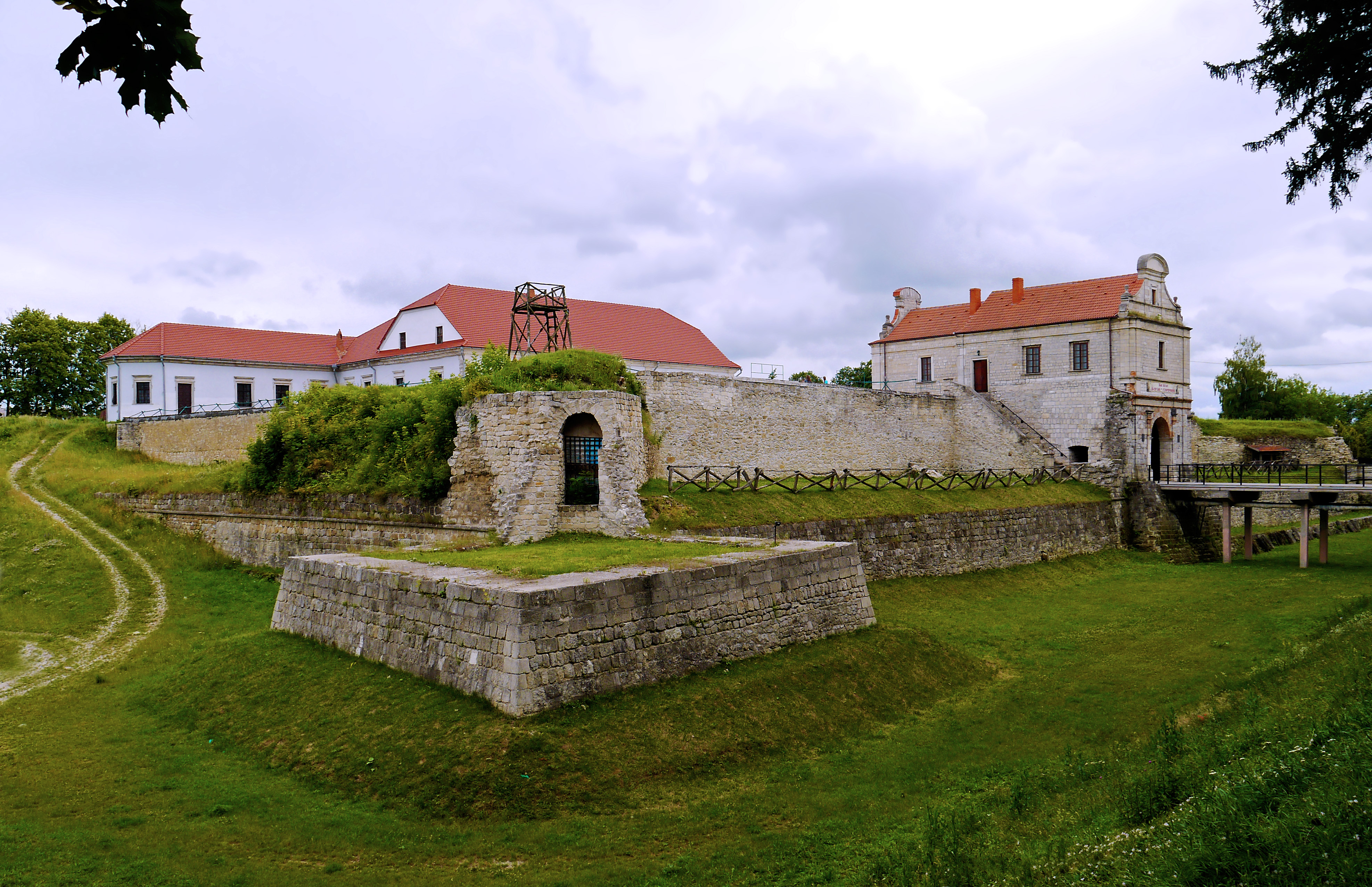
Zbarazh Castle

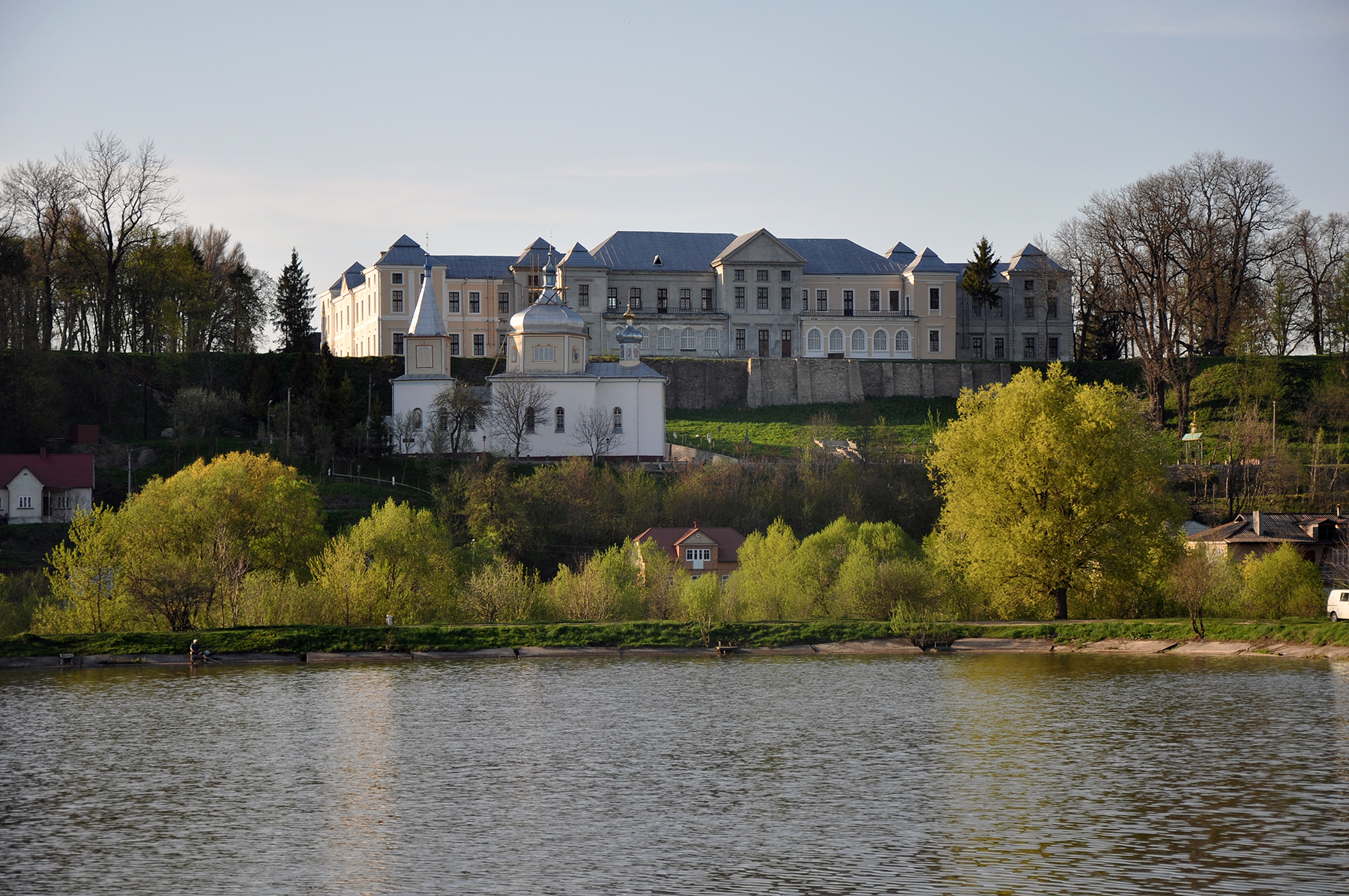
Vyshnivets Castle

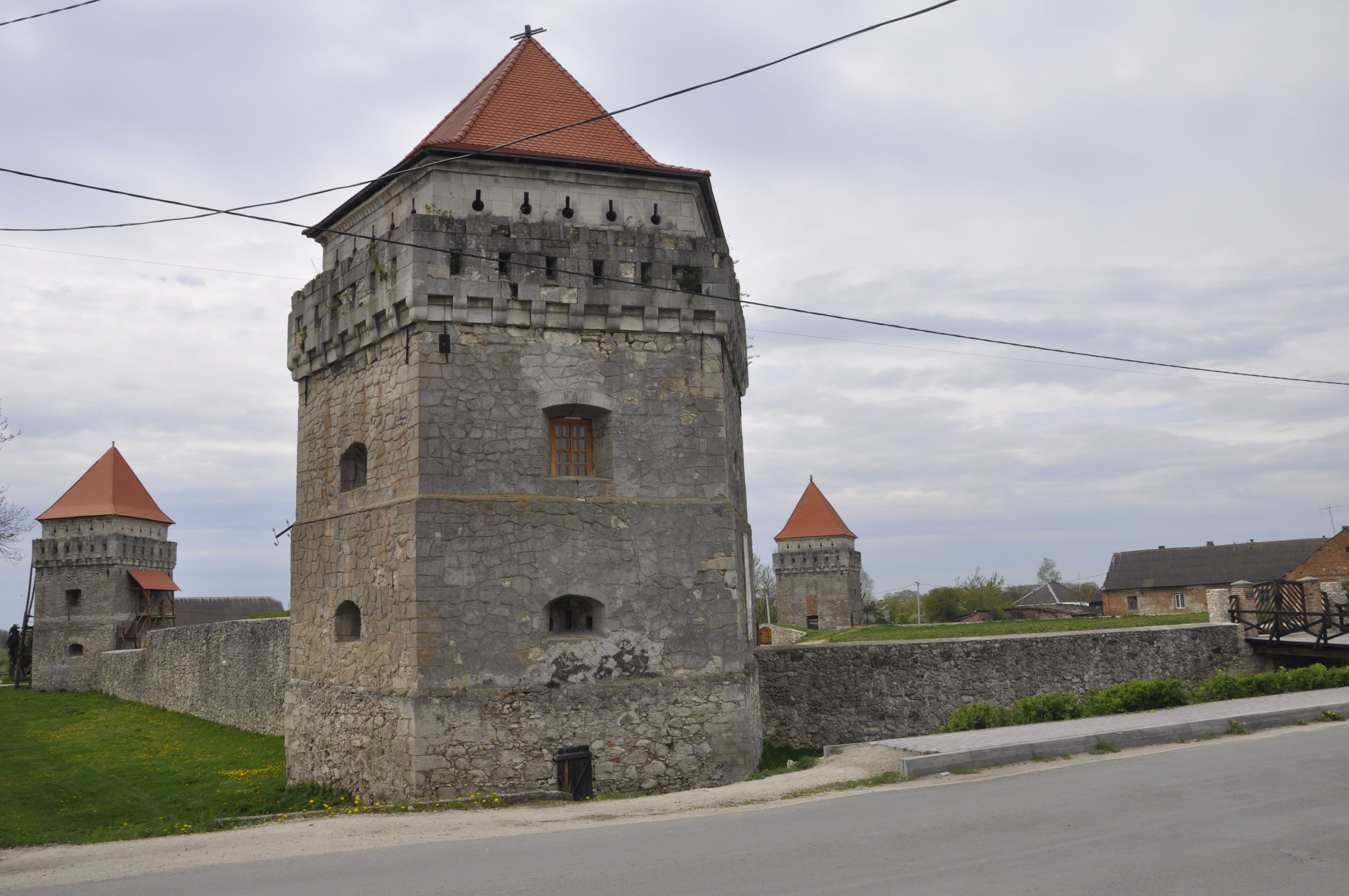
Skalat Castle

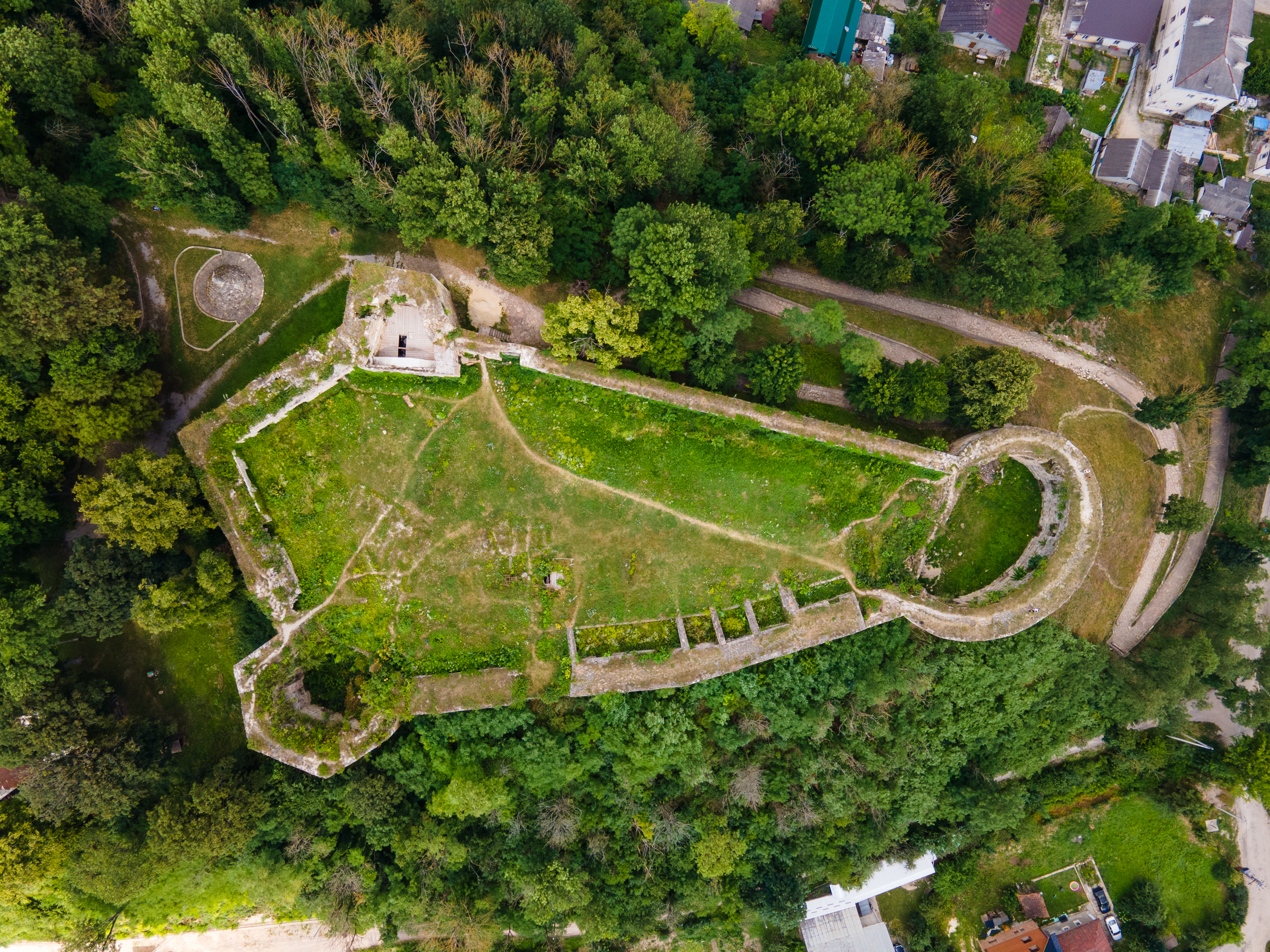
Terebovlia Castle

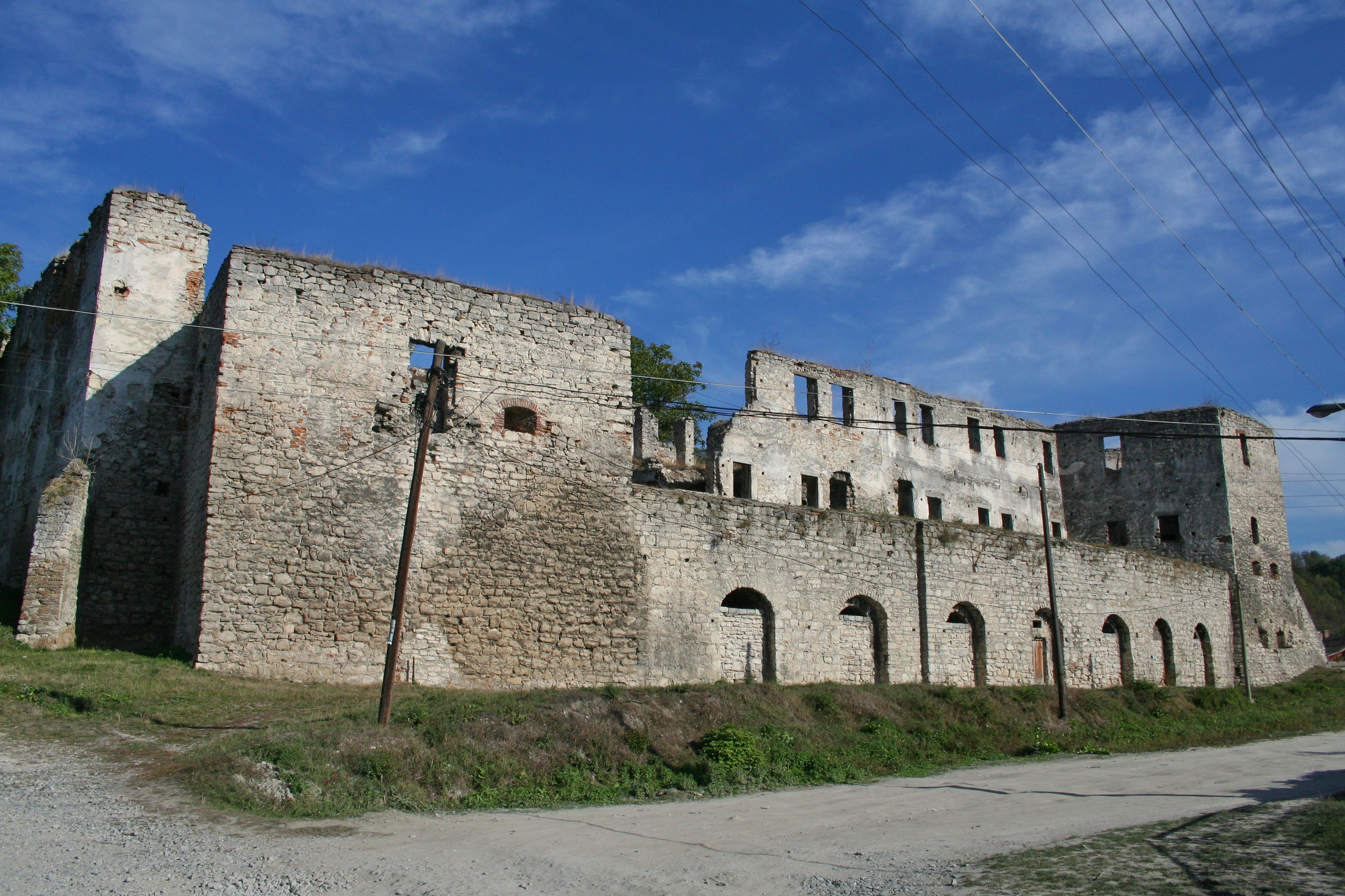
Chortkiv Castle

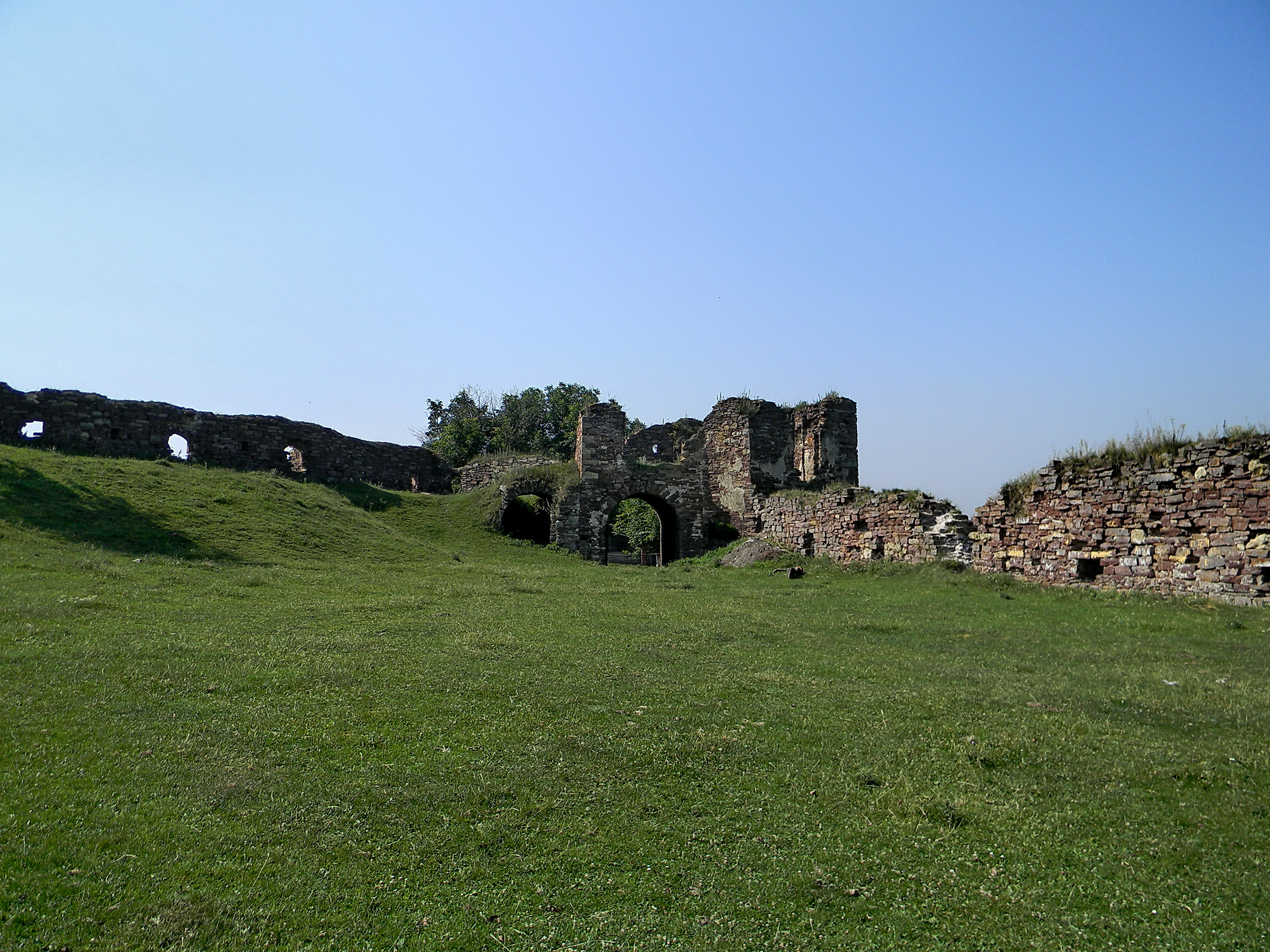
Pidzamochok Castle

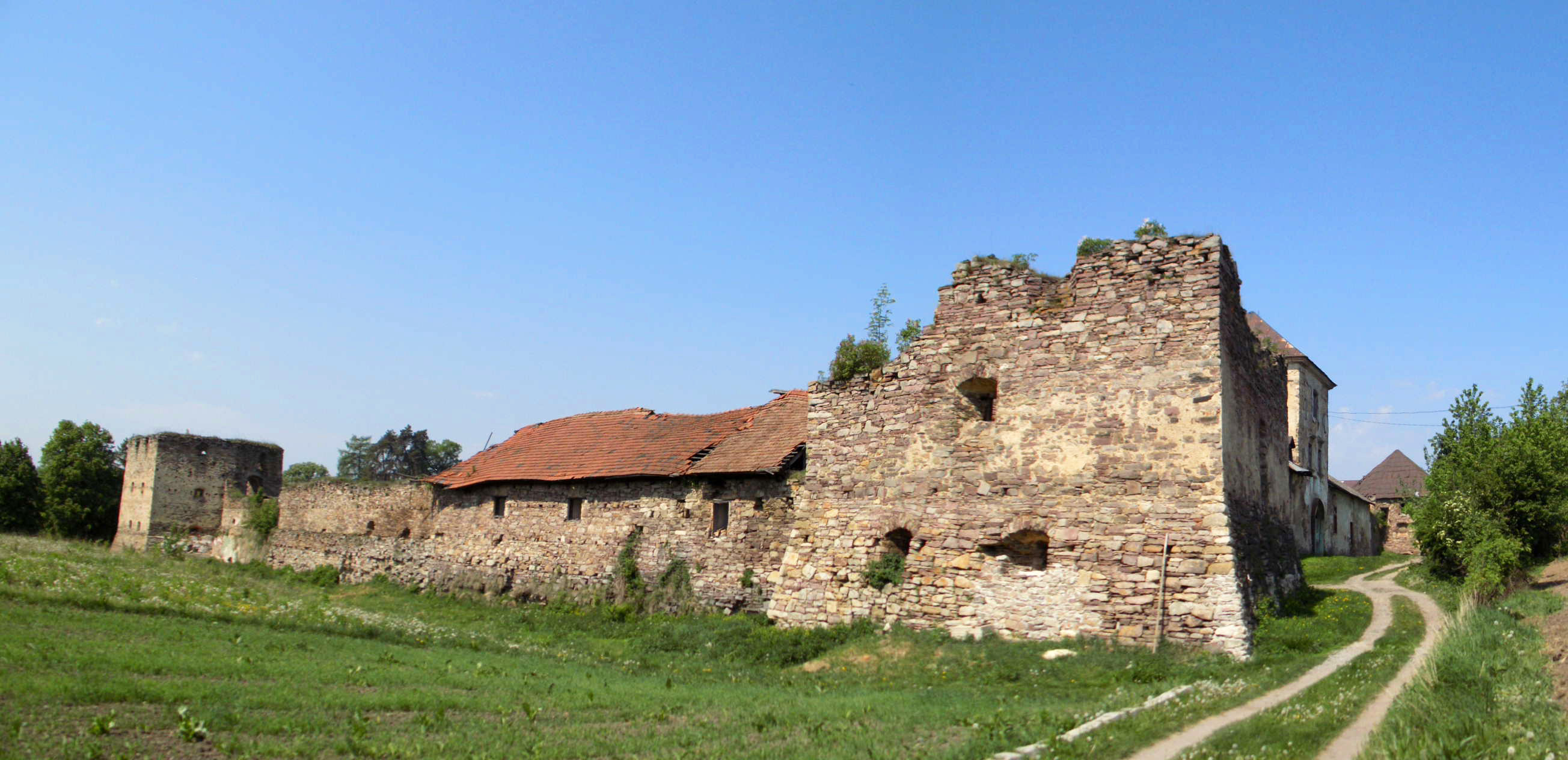
Zolotyi Potik Castle

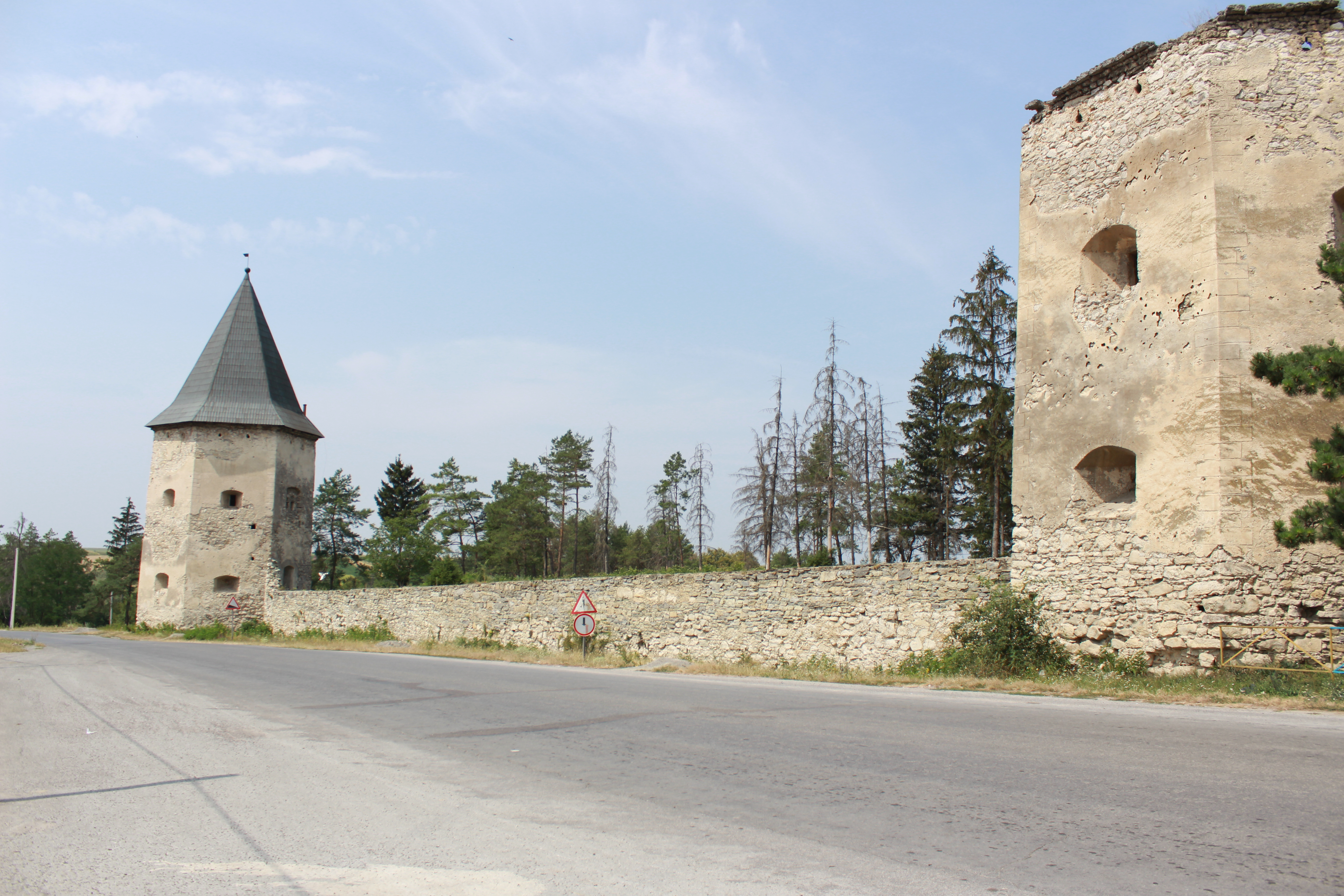
Kryvche Castle

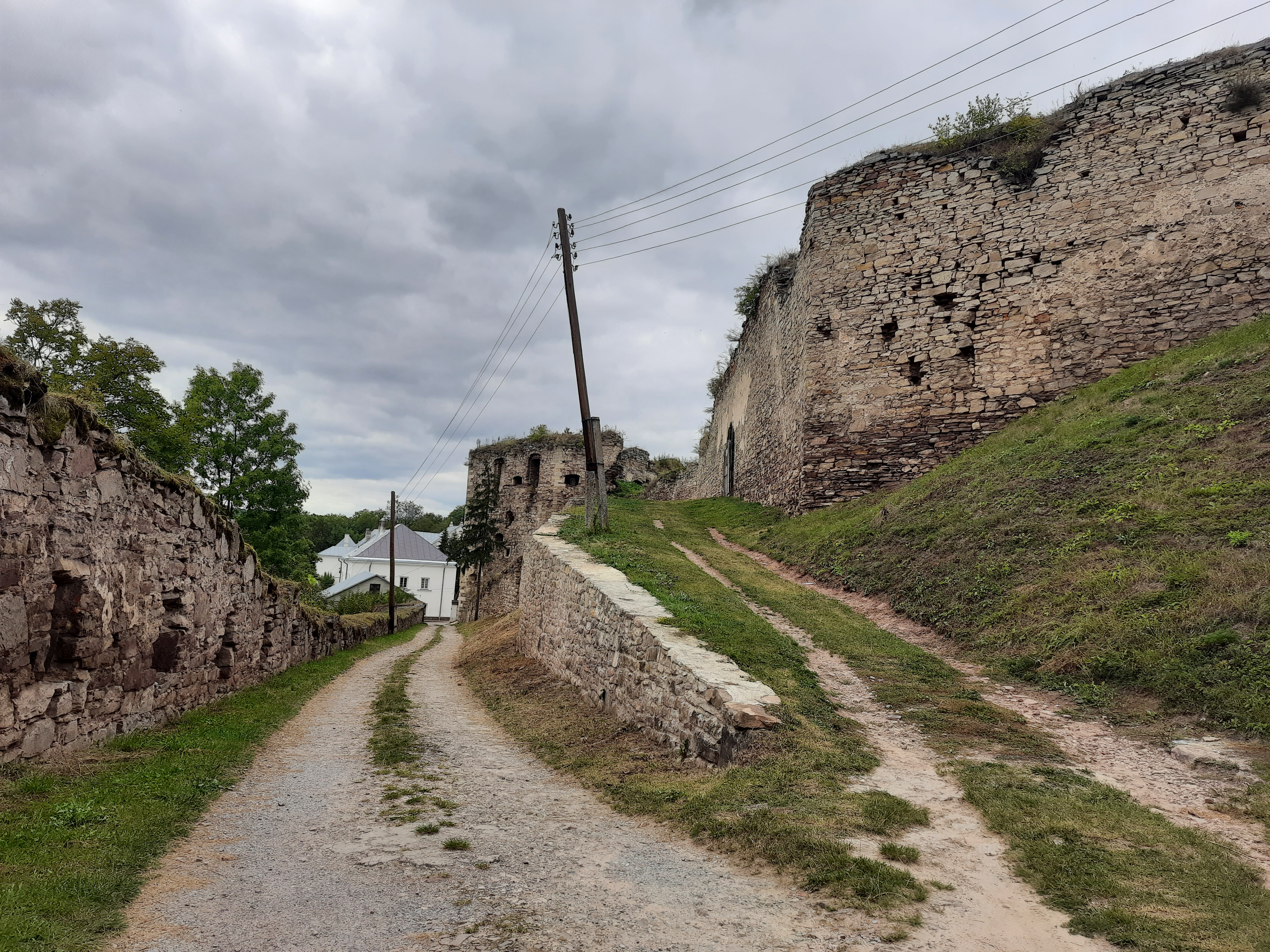
Yazlovets Castle

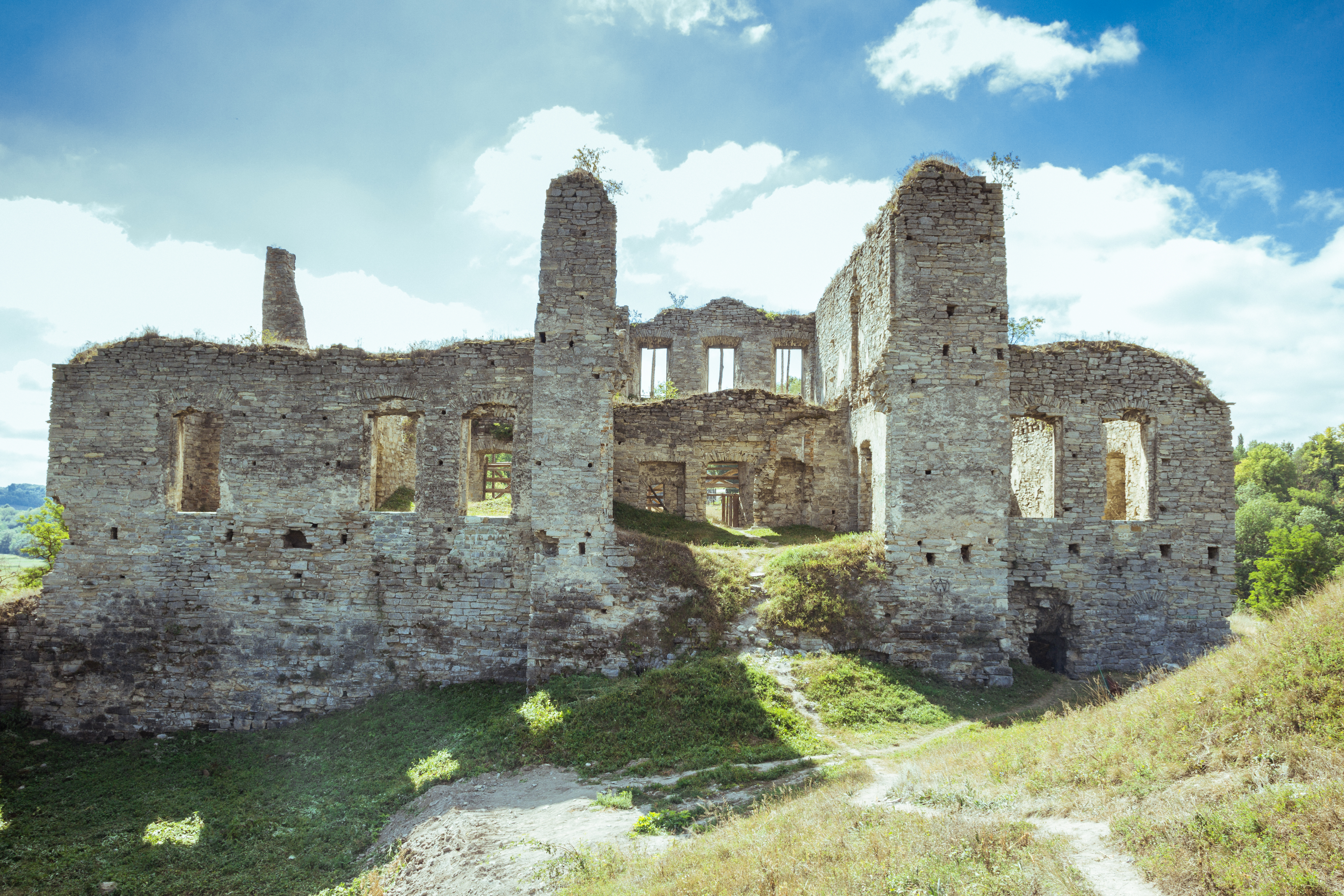
Skala-Podilska Castle

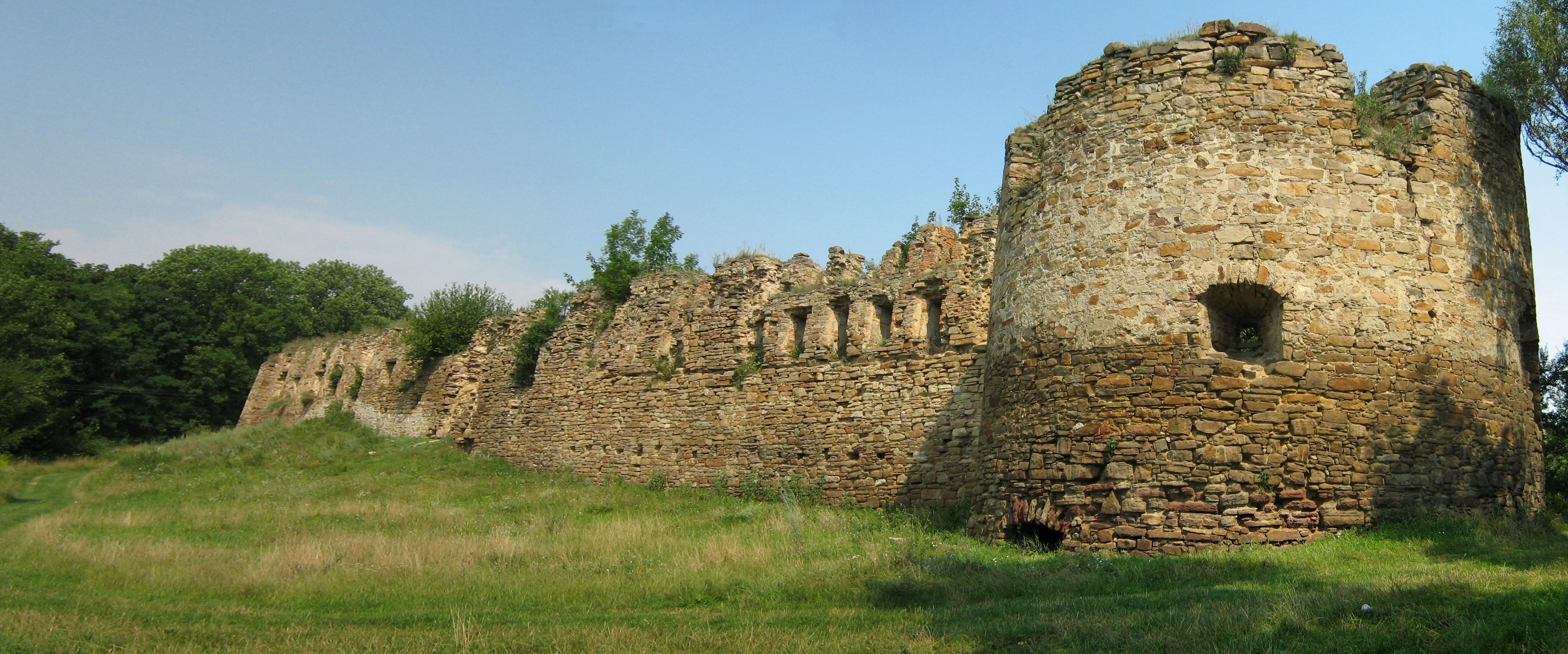
Mykulyntsi Castle

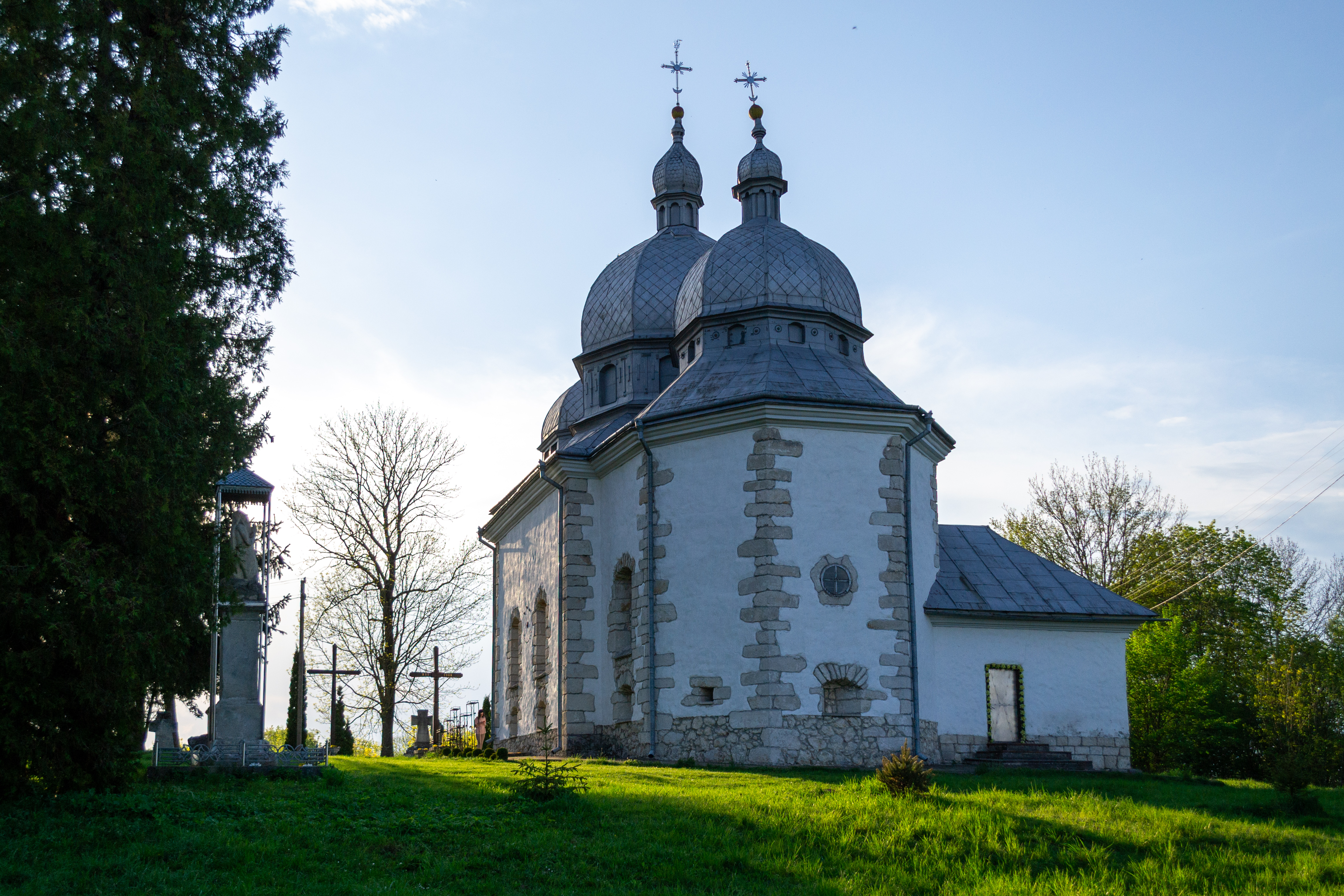
Church of the Transfiguration

== See also ==
- List of historic reserves in Ukraine

== Sources ==
- Dapyleiko, Volodymyr (2013). Bystrytska, E. (ed.). Національний заповідник "Замки Тернопілля" [National Reserve "Castles of Ternopil Oblast"] (PDF). Collected Works of the Shevchenko Scientific Society (in Ukrainian). 8. Ternopil National Technical University: 180–189.
