= Church of the Transfiguration, Zaluzhzhia =

Ukrainian Orthodox church in Zaluzhzhia, Ukraine

Church of the Transfiguration
- Церква Преображення Господнього
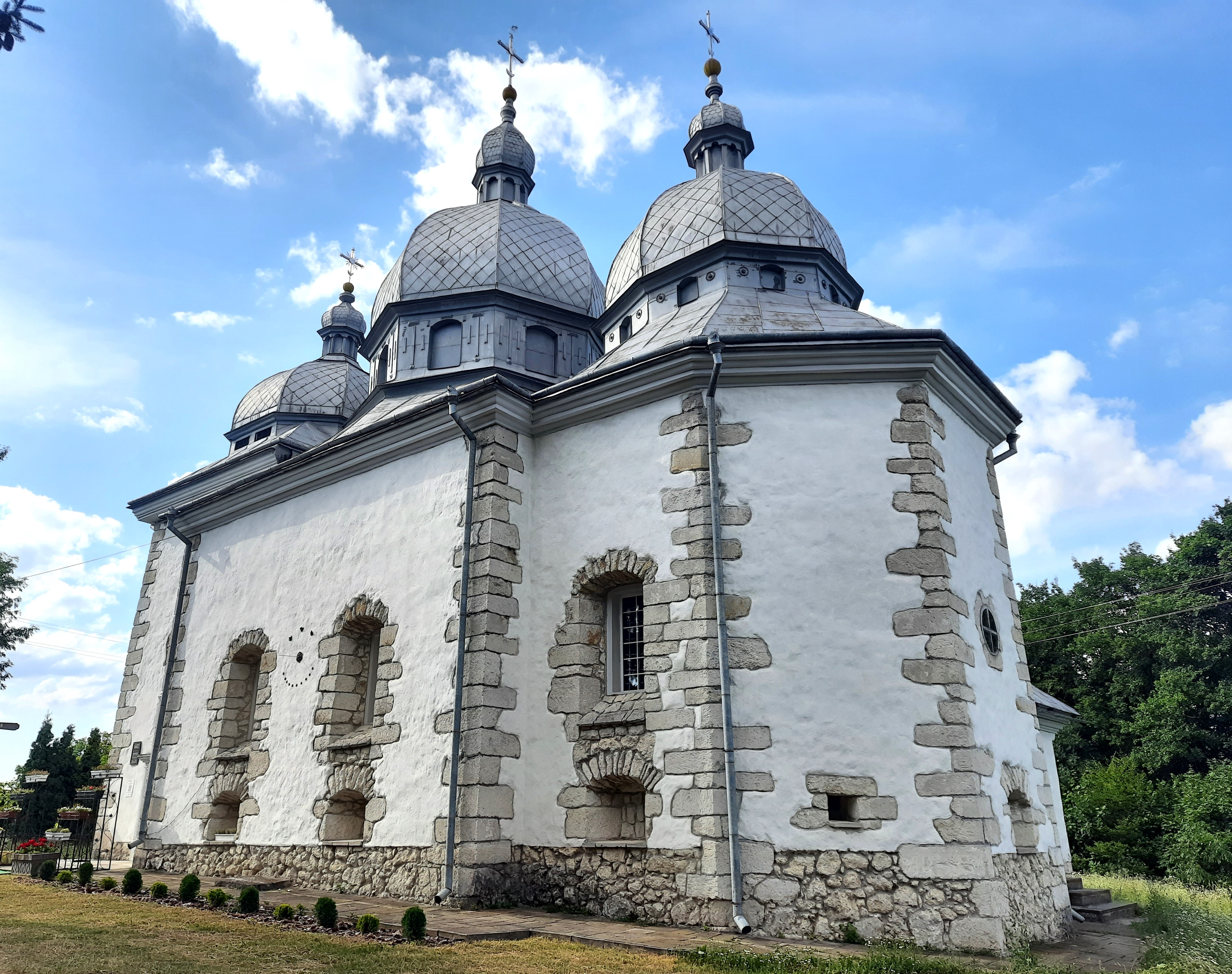
- Fortified Transfiguration Church

- Location within Ternopil Oblast

Religion
- Affiliation: Orthodox Church of Ukraine

Location
- Location: Zaluzhzhia, Zbarazh urban hromada, Ternopil Raion, Ternopil Oblast
- Coordinates: 49°40′19″N 25°45′4″E

Architecture
- Completed: 1600

Immovable Monument of National Significance of Ukraine
- Official name: Церква Преображення Господнього (Church of the Transfiguration of Our Lord)
- Type: Architecture
- Reference no.: 190010

Church of the Transfiguration (Ukrainian: Церква Преображення Господнього) is a fortified church (OCU) located in Zaluzhzhia in Ternopil Raion, Ternopil Oblast, Ukraine. It is an architectural monument of national significance dating back to the early 17th century, located on top of Chernecha Mountain and surrounded by forest. The church is part of the National Reserve "Castles of Ternopil Oblast".

== Historical context ==
The site of the modern church was previously occupied by the St. Onuphrius monastery, founded by a Kyiv monk in 1240 on Chernecha Mountain. Initially, it was a wooden hermitage, and by 1480, it had become a monastery. In the 14th century, the monastery was built near the walls of the Staryi Zbarazh Castle. The monastery had a defensive purpose, was surrounded by a stone wall with loopholes, and was connected to the castle by an underground passage. Due to Tatar raids and military turmoil, the monastery was destroyed several times. In particular, it was destroyed by the Tatar troops of Aidora in 1474, restored by the owner of Zbarazh, Semen Zbaraski, in 1480, and then destroyed again by the Tatars in 1589. Archaeological excavations have revealed a layer of charred wood and ash, indicating frequent fires.

In 1600, on the site of the St. Onuphrius Monastery, the Church of the Transfiguration of the Lord was built with a donation from Ivan Zbarazkyi. The date of completion of construction is confirmed by the foundation inscription above the entrance to the church in Old Slavonic. The inscription mentions that the church was built during the time of Janusz Zbaraski, Voivode of Bratslav, and through the efforts of Grzegorz Nowicki, Starosta of Zbarazh. Thanks to Dmytro Vyshnevetskyi, in 1682 the church once again became a monastery church, which has survived to this day.

At the end of the 17th century, when Zbarazh belonged to Prince Dmytro Vyshnevetskyi, restoration work was carried out. At the same time, the Holy Savior Monastery, built of stone, began to be rebuilt on the foundations of the old monastery. The monastery grounds were surrounded by a stone wall with loopholes and ramparts with a palisade.

In 1788, the monastery buildings were sold and dismantled, and the stone was used to build a farmstead. From the end of the 18th century, the Holy Savior Church has functioned as a parish church.

== Architecture and decoration ==
The church belongs to the defensive type of structures. It is three-part, built of stone. Its defensive features include thick walls (1.5–2 meters) and five loopholes located on the walls of the church. A two-story bell tower was built above the narthex, forming a single structure with the church, which also served for defense. For greater strength, the walls of the tower have a noticeable angle of inclination.

On the north side of the nave, there's a stone crypt (basement) where burials were held until 1961, and during the war (1941–1945), a big bass bell was hidden there. The floor in the church is covered with stone tiles.

The iconostasis is modern, four-tiered, made of wood in the 19th century. It is richly decorated with carvings covered with gold foil.

The bells were reinstalled in the bell tower in August 1989. The oldest bell, "Saint Nicholas" (bass), was made in 1732 and recast in 1871.

The interior walls and vaults are decorated with icons. The paintings "Intercession of the Virgin Mary", "Coronation of the Virgin Mary", "Transfiguration" and images of the four evangelists were painted in the 19th century by an unknown painter.

== Current status ==
In 1961, despite its status as a historical monument, the church was closed, which led to its looting and destruction. In 1989, at the request of local residents, the church was returned to the faithful.

From 1994, the church was transferred to the balance sheet of the National Reserve "Castles of Ternopil Oblast". In 2009, steam heating was installed to combat dampness and mold, and restoration and repair work on the interior began. During this work in 2009, a stone tablet was discovered indicating the burial place of the church's builder, Grzegorz Nowicki.

Although the church is part of the Reserve "Castles of Ternopil Oblast", the land on which it is located belongs to the Zbarazh City Council. The reserve has made attempts to acquire the territory for permanent use in November 2024, February 2025, and March 2025 to ensure the territory's protection and later create an ethnographic museum on the site.
