= Skalat =

City in Ternopil Oblast, Ukraine

Skalat Скалат
- City
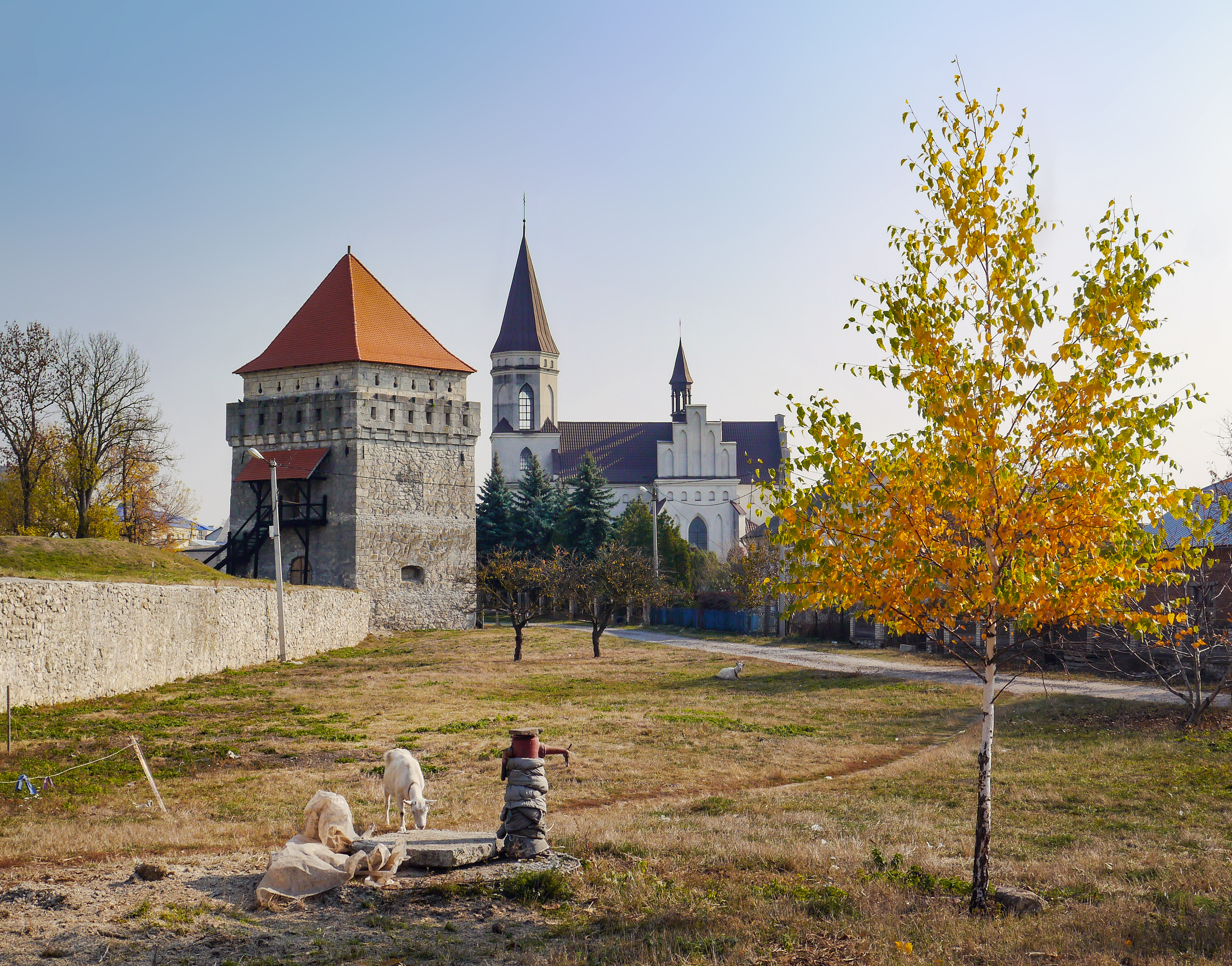
- Skalat Castle and Church of Saint Anne

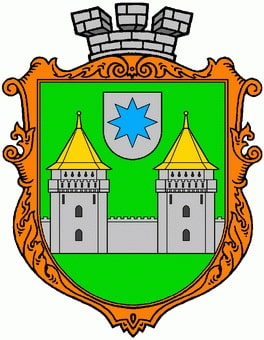
- Flag Coat of arms

- Map showing Skalat in Ukraine Skalat (Ternopil Oblast)
- Coordinates: 49.4285°N 25.9713°E
- Country: Ukraine
- Oblast: Ternopil Oblast
- Raion: Ternopil Raion
- Hromada: Skalat urban hromada
- First mentioned: 16th century
- Magdeburg rights: 1600

Population (2022)
  - Total: 3,739
- Time zone: UTC+2 (EET)
  - Summer (DST): UTC+3 (EEST)

Skalat (Ukrainian: Скалат, IPA: [ˈskɑlɐt]; Polish: Skałat; Yiddish: סקאלאט) is a small city in Ternopil Raion, Ternopil Oblast, western Ukraine. It hosts the administration of Skalat urban hromada, one of the hromadas of Ukraine. Population: 3,739 (2022 estimate).

== History ==
Historical affiliations

Kingdom of Poland bef. 1512–1569
Polish–Lithuanian Commonwealth 1569– 1772
Habsburg monarchy 1772–1804
Austrian Empire 1804–1809
Russian Empire 1809–1815
Austrian Empire 1815–1918
West Ukrainian People's Republic 1918-1919
Second Polish Republic 1919–1939
Soviet Union (Ukrainian SSR) 1939–1941
Nazi Germany (occupation) 1941-1944
Soviet Union (Ukrainian SSR) 1944–1991
Ukraine 1991–present

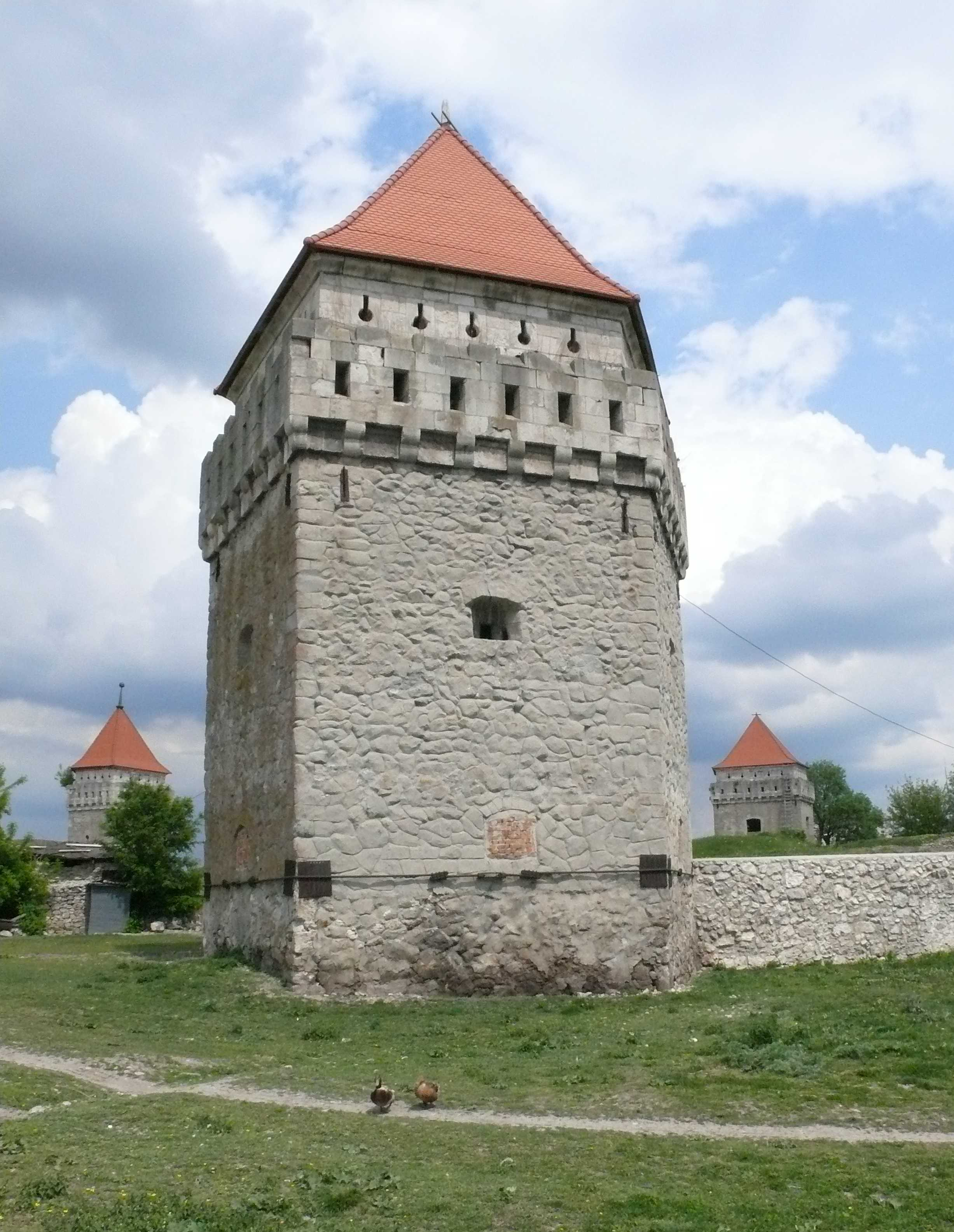
Skalat Castle

Skalat was first mentioned in written sources dated 1512. At that time, the village belonged to Halych Land, Ruthenian Voivodeship, Lesser Poland Province, Kingdom of Poland. In c. 1600, when Skalat belonged to the noble Sienienski family, which began construction of Skalat Castle. Zbigniew Sienienski, the castellan of Lublin, founded a new town, which he called Dębno, after family's coat of arms. The name did not catch, however, and in 1602, Skalat was purchased by the Chodkiewicz family. Twelve years later, the village was in the hands of the Korecki family, and in 1627, it was purchased by Krzysztof Wichrowski, the miecznik of Halicz.

Wichrowski expanded the castle, and in 1632 founded a Roman Catholic parish. His daughter Weronika married into the Firlej family, and Skalat was her dowry. The castle was destroyed during the Khmelnytsky Uprising, and on July 26, 1657, during the Battle of Skałat, Crimean Tatars, allied with Poland, annihilated Transilvanian army of George II Rákóczi, which had invaded Poland a few months before. The Tatars killed 500 Transilvanians, capturing 11,000.

Skalat was again destroyed in 1675, during the Polish–Ottoman War (1672–76). The town, which was in ruins, recovered very slowly. In 1699, Jan Firlej renovated the castle, making it his residence with a palace, built inside its walls. In the early 18th century, Skalat belonged to the Kalinowski family, and in 1766 King Stanisław August Poniatowski confirmed its town charter, which had been issued either in 1600, or 1634.

After the First Partition of Poland Skalat was in 1772 annexed by the Habsburg Empire, and remained in Austrian Galicia until late 1918. At that time, the town was part of the Austrian monarchy (Austria side the compromise of 1867), head of the district with the same name, one of the 78 Bezirkshauptmannschaften in Austrian Galicia province (Crown land) in 1900. In late May 1809, during the Polish–Austrian War, most of eastern Galicia was captured by a Polish army under Piotr Strzyzewski. Polish forces withdrew westwards, when the Russians entered this area. Following the Treaty of Schönbrunn, Austria ceded the area of Tarnopol, together with Skalat, to the Russians, who controlled it until the 1815 Congress of Vienna. At that time, the town belonged to the Poniatowski family, which in 1821 opened here a school, and in 1827 funded a brick church. In 1857, the population of Skalat was app. 4,000. The ancient castle belonged to a Jewish family of the Rozenstock, which later changed name into von Rozstocki.

In the late 19th century, Skalat slowly grew, becoming seat of a county. In 1870, its population was 4,500, with 2,600 Jews. In 1897, it received a train connection with Tarnopol, but in the next year, almost the whole town burned down in a great fire. In 1914, the population grew to 6,300.

In the immediate post-World War I period, Skalat was seized by local Ukrainian activists, who declared that the town was part of West Ukrainian People's Republic. Polish–Ukrainian tension escalated, and climaxed in the Polish–Ukrainian War. On April 23, 1919, Ukrainian activists murdered a popular Roman Catholic parish priest from Skalat, Rev. Walerian Raba, and on July 16, 1919, the town was captured by the Polish Army.

Historical population
Year	Pop.	±%
1921	5,937	—
1931	6,949	+17.0%
2022	3,739	−46.2%

In 1923 Skałat became the seat of a county in the Tarnopol Voivodeship. It also was a garrison of Battalion Skałat of the Border Protection Corps. In 1939, together with the suburbs of Mantiawa, Ksiezy Kat and Targowica, Skałat had a mixed Polish, Jewish and Ukrainian population of over 7,000. During the initial phase of the Soviet Invasion of Poland, the Red Army units bypassed the town, heading towards Tarnopol. The Soviets did not enter Skałat until September 21, 1939, four days after the invasion.

Skalat was taken by the Wehrmacht during Operation Barbarossa on 7 July 1941. 20 Jews were massacred on the same day, and the following day, local Ukrainians carried out a pogrom against the town's Jews with German assistance, wherein about 560 Jews were massacred. Later in the month, ransom payments were demanded of the Jews, and they were drafted for forced labor, some of which was done in concentration camps.

In late August 1942, about 600 Jews considered "unfit for work" were sent to the Belzec extermination camp. In early October 1942, Jews from surrounding villages were brought into Skalat.

From 21–22 October 1942, an Aktion was carried out in the town. German and Ukrainian policemen went house to house, and 153 Jews were shot to death. 2,700 Jews were deported to their deaths at Belzec, with another 200 sent to the Janowska concentration camp. In another Aktion on 9 November 1942, 1,100 more Jews were deported to Belzec. The remaining Jews in Skalat were centralized in a ghetto, where they suffered from hunger and diseases. On 7 April 1943, 750 Jews were taken from the ghetto and shot in pits, among them those who had been in the hospital and its medical staff.

On 9 June 1943 a final Aktion was carried out, with 500 Jews executed in pits. About 400 Jews in a local work camp in Skalat were executed the following month. During the Volhynian massacre, Skalat was a shelter for Polish population of the countryside, which was attacked by Ukrainian nationalists. On March 22, 1944, the town was recaptured by the Red Army.

After The Holocaust and expulsion of its Polish residents, the population of Skalat was reduced to 2,000, and the town lost its status of the capital of a county (raion). In 1963, the local Catholic church was blown up by the Soviet authorities.

Until 18 July 2020, Skalat belonged to Pidvolochysk Raion. The raion was abolished in July 2020 as part of the administrative reform of Ukraine, which reduced the number of raions of Ternopil Oblast to three. The area of Pidvolochysk Raion was merged into Ternopil Raion.

== Demographics ==
As of the 2001 Ukrainian census, Skalat had a population of 4,042 inhabitants. Ukrainians make up the overwhelming majority of the population, yet a significant Polish minority also exists in the town. The exact ethnic composition was as follows:

Ethnic groups in Skalat
	percent
Ukrainians	94.09%
Poles	4.65%
Russians	0.99%
others	0.27%

== Sights ==
- Skalat Castle, built c. 1600 by the Sieniawski family
- 17th-century synagogue
- Orthodox church (1872)
- Roman Catholic cemetery chapel (1939)
- tenement houses and public utility houses from the interbellum period
- the Polish Sokół movement building (1909), barracks of the Border Protection Corps, House of Soldier – abandoned and devastated

== Notable people ==
- Aaron Bernstein – author (1809)
- Edward Klich – scholar, professor of Poznań University
- Leszek Winowski – law expert, professor of Lublin and Wrocław universities
- Maria Winowska – writer and publicist
- Khrystyna Stebelska – chief editor of the National Television Company of Ukraine. Grown up in Skalat, Mrs. Stebelska is now among the honorable holders of the Skalat Castle. She has got a huge collection of photos, which reflect a long, more than half a century, history of her hometown.
