= Vyshnivets Palace =

Historical main seat of Wiśniowiecki family, Ternopil Oblast, Ukraine

- Vyshnivets, Ternopil Oblast
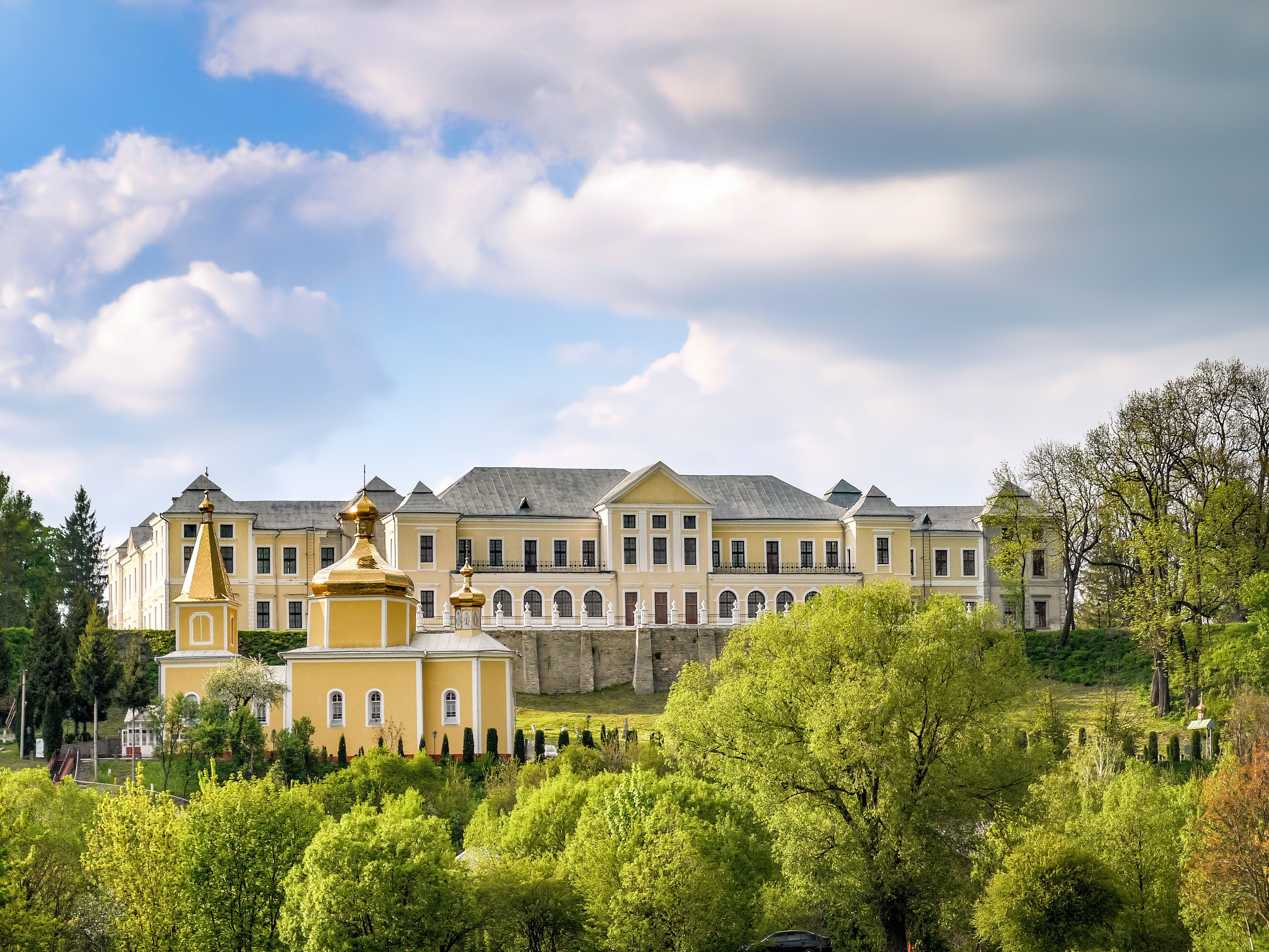
- Facade of the Vyshnivets Palace

Site information
- Type: Palace
- Condition: Under reconstruction

Location
- Coordinates: 49°53′58″N 25°44′18″E

Site history
- Built: 1395 – 16th century
- Built by: Michał Zbaraski Wiśniowiecki

Immovable Monument of National Significance of Ukraine
- Official name: Палацово-парковий комплекс (Palace and park complex)
- Type: Architecture
- Reference no.: 190022

The Vyshnivets Palace (Ukrainian: Вишнівецький палац) or the Wiśniowiecki Palace (Polish: Pałac Wiśniowieckich) is located in the rural settlement of Vyshnivets, near the city of Zbarazh in western Ukraine's Ternopil Oblast. Historically, it was the main residence of the Wiśniowiecki princely family, who took their name from the town.

== History ==
In 1395, after being removed from power in Novgorod-Siversky, the nobleman Dmitry Koribut was granted control over lands in Volhynia, where he began constructing fortifications. The first castle was built on the banks of the Horyn River in what is now the village of Staryi Vyshnevets (Old Vyshnivets).

After Dmitry Koribut's death without a male heir, the castle and its estate passed through a collateral branch of the Olgerdovich-Nesvitsky family for three generations. In 1517, ownership transferred to Michał Zbaraski Wiśniowiecki.

In 1491, a raid by Turk-Tatar forces razed the fort and the surrounding settlement in Stary Vyshnevets. That same year, Michał Zbaraski, who had adopted the name Wiśniowiecki, began construction of a new castle upstream on a hilltop. This new fortress was intended to serve as a bastion against Tatar-Turkish raids for centuries.

The stronghold was completely reconstructed as a defensive fortification in the 1640s under the supervision of Jeremi Wiśniowiecki, incorporating a bastion defense system. However, these defenses failed to prevent the castle's capture by Cossacks during the uprising of 1648, and it was sacked by Tatars a year later following the Treaty of Zboriv.

Despite its advanced fortifications, the castle fell to enemy attacks again. It was taken by Tatars in 1655 and later by the Turks in 1675 during the Polish-Ottoman War, leaving it in ruins. The town and castle were so devastated during the tumultuous 17th century that the king of Poland, John III Sobieski, relieved the town from taxes for twenty years.

Michał Serwacy Wiśniowiecki (1680–1744), a wealthy Polish nobleman and the last male-line descendant of the Wiśniowiecki family, began restoring his ancestral estate. Instead of rebuilding a castle, he constructed a magnificent palace on the ruins, completing it in 1720. The structure retained a defensive role, however, and housed a garrison until 1760. Later, a palace church and a large park were added, befitting a magnate's residence.

Upon the death of the last male member of the Wiśniowiecki family, ownership of the palace and estate passed through the female line to the Mniszech family. Under their stewardship, the palace reached its full splendor, becoming a notable example of European palace and landscape design.

Three generations of Mniszech owners—Jan Karol (1716–1759), Michał Jerzy (1748–1806), and Karol Filip (1794–1846)—gave the estate a truly royal character. They amassed a vast collection of paintings from the Wiśniowiecki, Potocki, Sanguszko, Czartoryski, and Ostrogski families, along with sculptures, period furniture, Dutch tile mantels, books, weapons, and fine china. These comprehensive upgrades cemented its reputation as the finest palace residence in Volhynia.

However, just four years after inheriting the estate, the last Mniszech owner left for France, taking the most valuable family relics with him, including two thousand books, family portraits, letters, and heraldic research. For many years, the palace became a site for trade, where many of its thoughtfully collected items were sold off.

Over more than sixty years (1852–1913), the palace passed through nine different owners. Despite their titles and social status, they used the lavish residence as a means to shore up their own finances. The palace lost its glamour, and its priceless collection was plundered.

Shortly before First World War, a new owner, the Volhynian aristocrat Pavel Demidov (1869–1935), attempted a restoration and invited Kyiv architect Władysław Horodecki (1863–1930) to lead the project. Unfortunately, the war and the subsequent revolution intervened. The palace was used by the 25th Army Corps of the Imperial Russian Army, followed by the provisional government and forces loyal to Symon Petliura.

In the mid-1920s, the main building housed a museum collection, while the rest of the space was used as a craft school.

During World War II, remaining valuables were shipped to Moscow by Soviet authorities (1940–1941). During the German occupation (1941–1944), the Wehrmacht used it as a police station and Gestapo headquarters, stripping the palace of its last few showpieces. A fire in 1944 completed its destruction.

A post-war restoration in the 1950s renewed the palace's exterior. However, the interior was remodeled with little regard for the original layout, the park was neglected, and the grounds became overgrown. Further plundering by local residents also occurred.

In 1963, the palace was officially recognized as an architectural monument, though it continued to be used for various purposes, including as a community club, a library, a clothing factory, and a craft school.

The palace's fortunes improved following Ukrainian independence. Historical and cultural research was conducted in 1993, and in 1999, the castle officially became a branch of the State Historical and Architectural Sanctuary of Zbarazh. It was later included in the National Reserve "Castles of Ternopil Oblast" in 2005, and a comprehensive restoration program began. By 2007, all non-museum-related entities had vacated the premises.

By 2014, the main phase of construction, including interior restoration, landscaping of the park, and fencing, was completed.

== Architecture ==
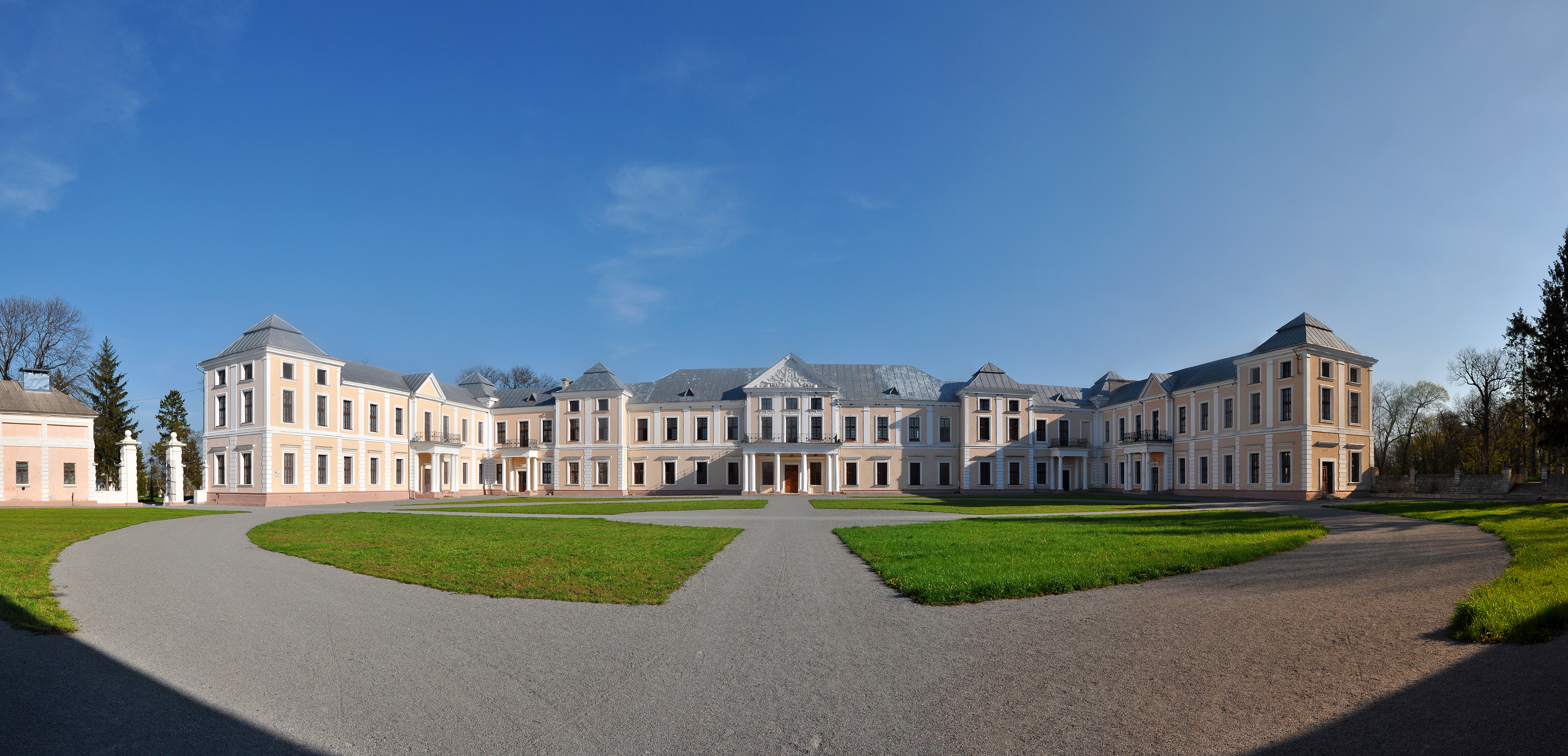
Main building of Vyshnivets Palace

The architecture of Vyshnivets Palace combines features of Late Baroque and Classicism. The reconstructed palace has a classical appearance, with an elongated, two-story main facade flanked by taller, three-story wings, forming a symmetrical U-shape. The central part of the facade features a ceremonial avant-corps with a triangular pediment decorated with stucco ornamentation. The rear facade has arched galleries between the avant-corps. The main gateway to the residence is designed in the style of a classical triumphal arch.

Inside, the palace has a symmetrical layout with a central hall, staircases, and a grand ballroom. Several halls are connected by wide archways, which once housed a mirror gallery containing numerous works of art, renowned as one of the finest among the residences of the Polish–Lithuanian Commonwealth in the 18th century.

== Gallery ==
Castle views

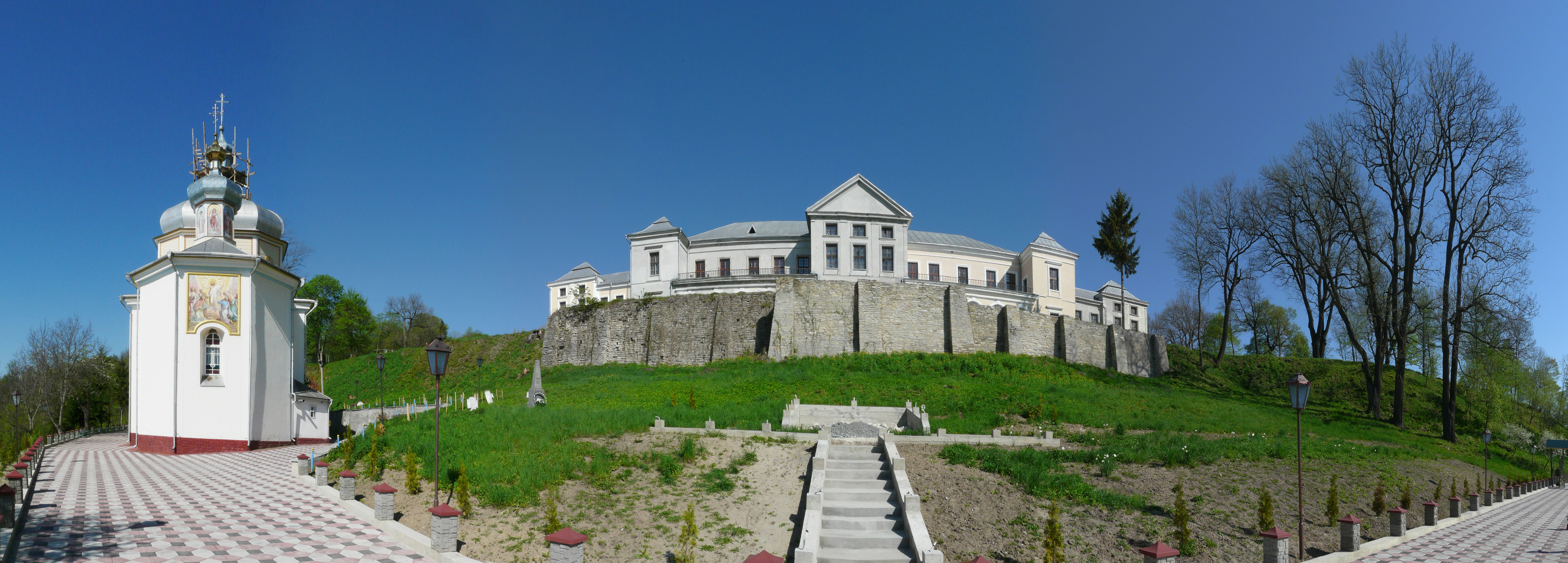
Panorama of the Ascension Church and the palace

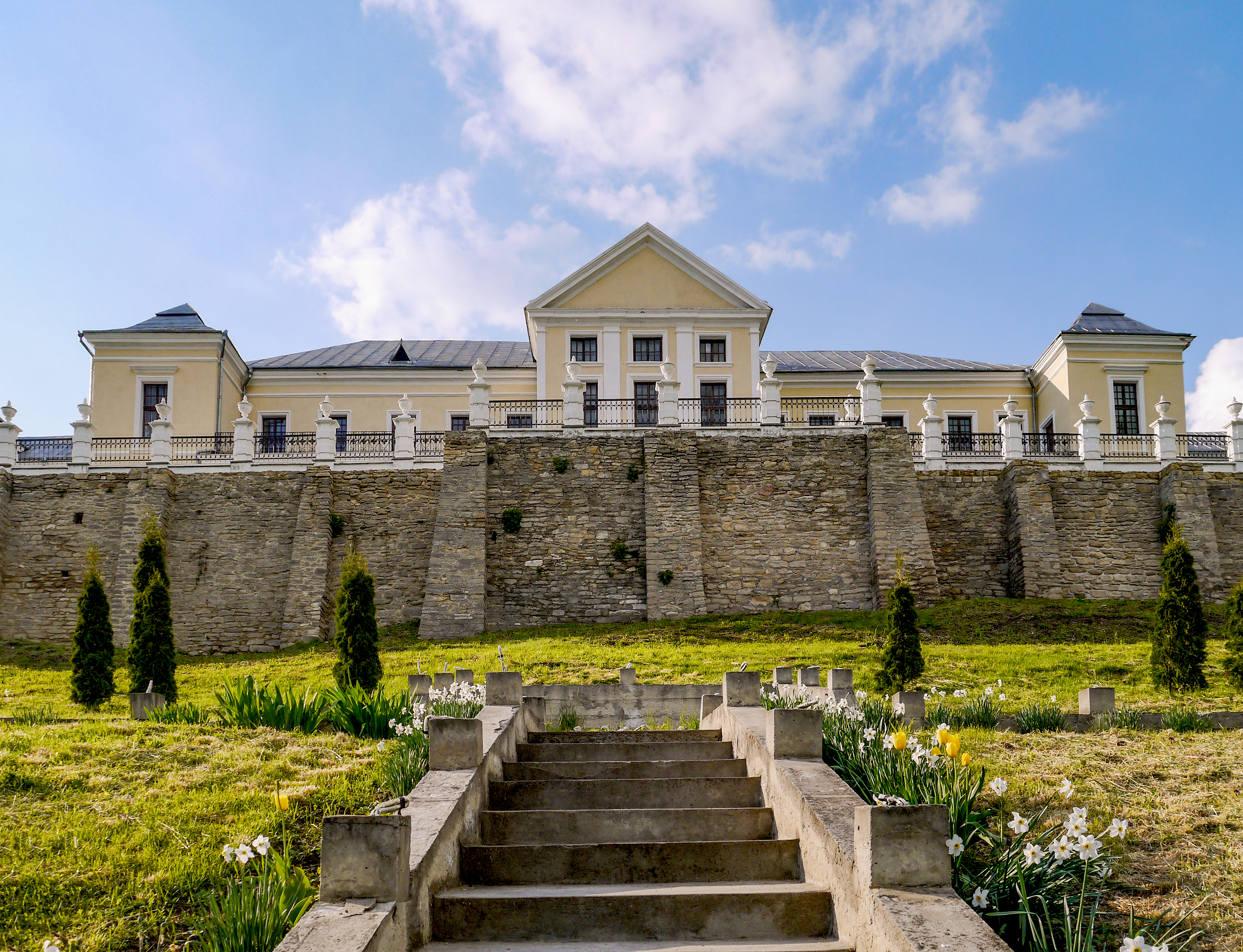
View of the palace

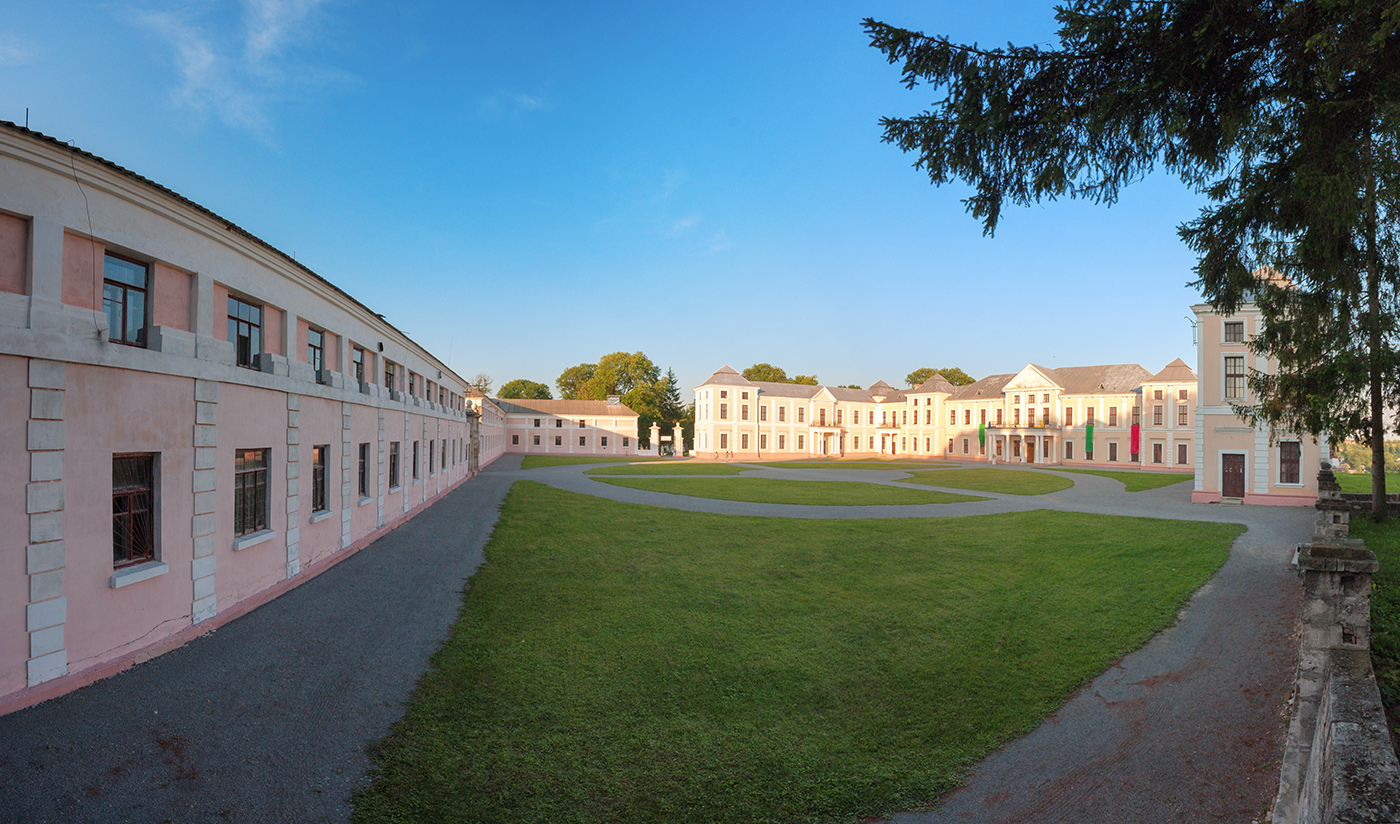
Courtyard

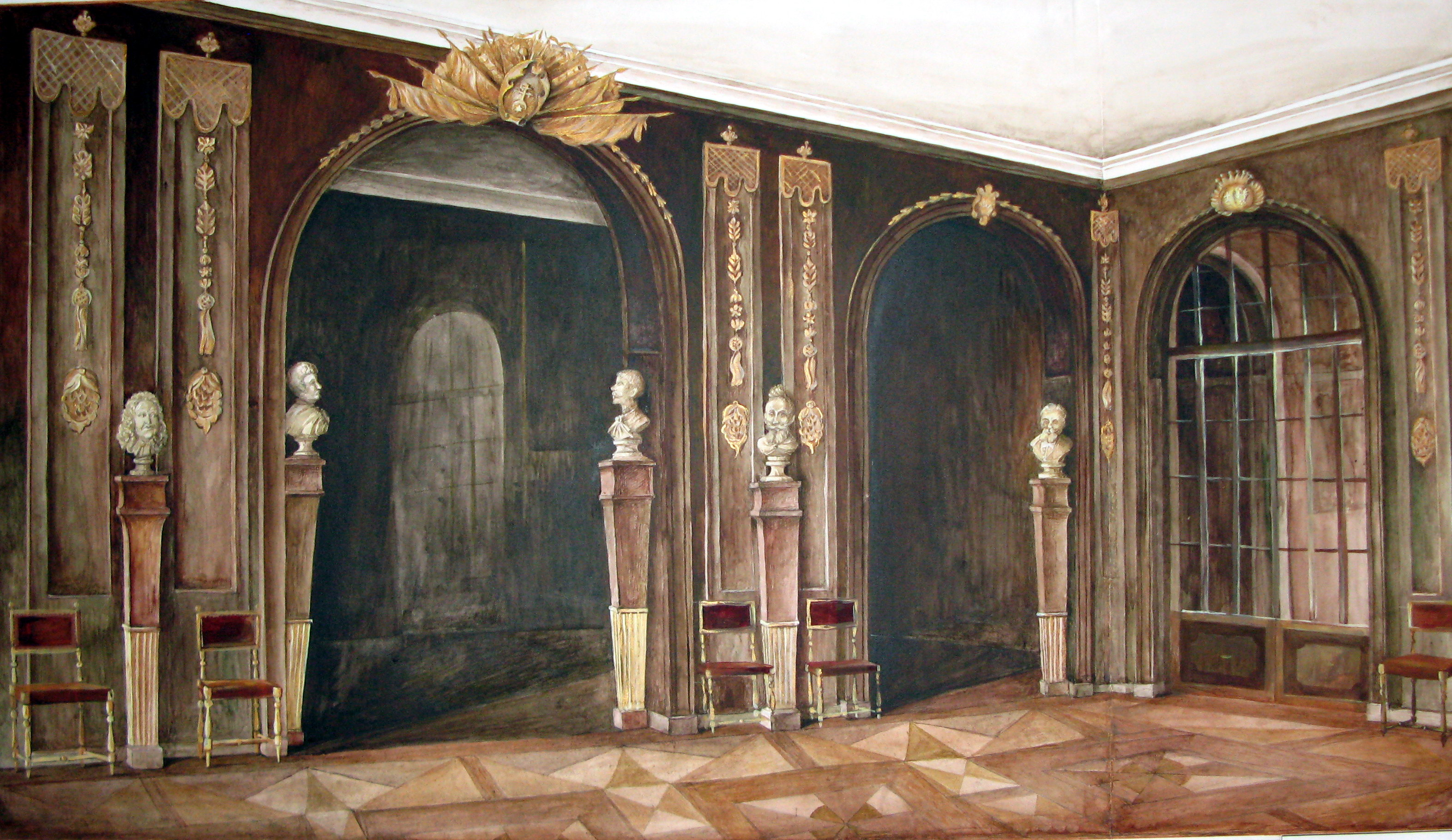
Interior of the palace

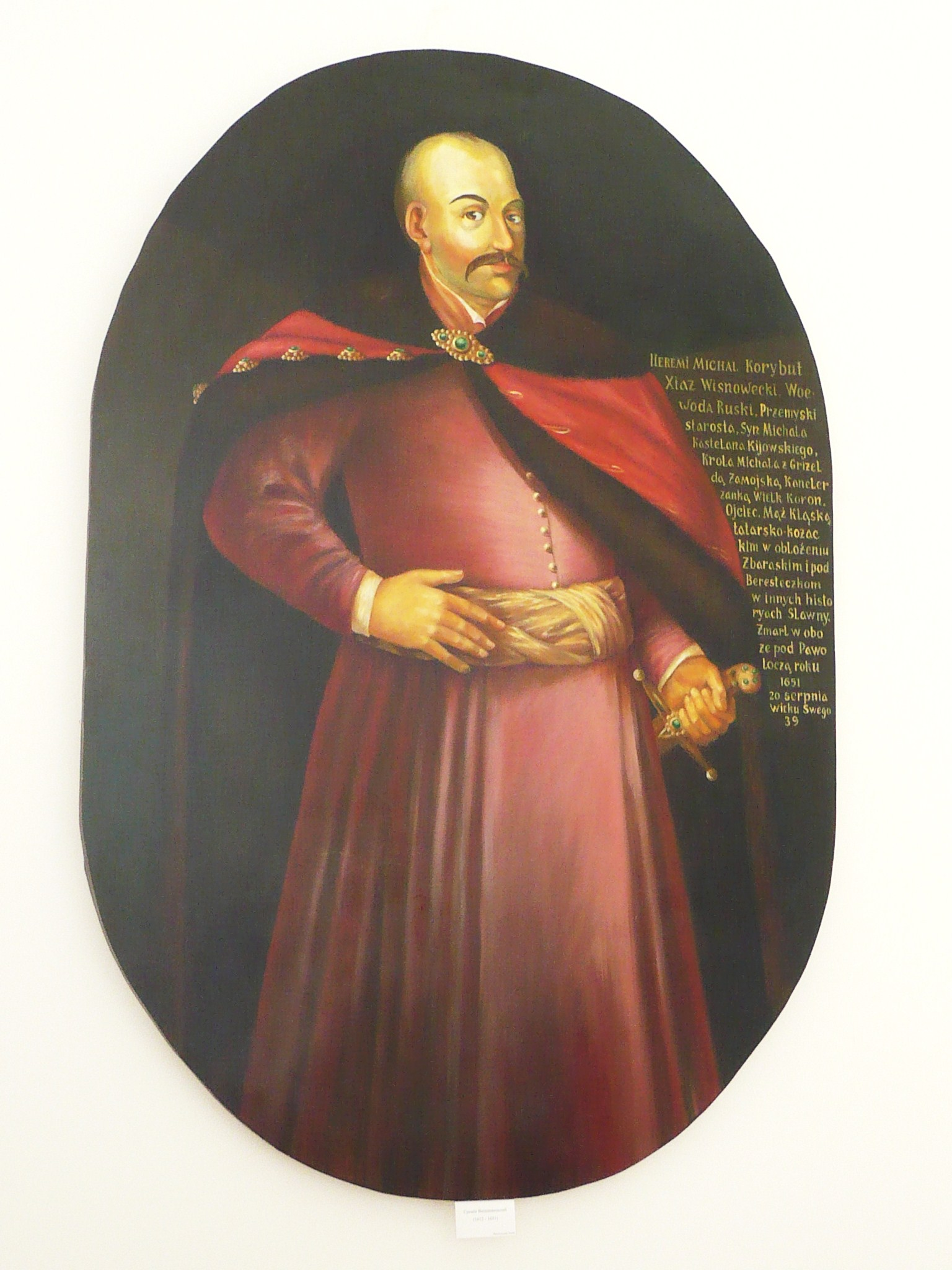
Portrait of Jeremi Wiśniowiecki

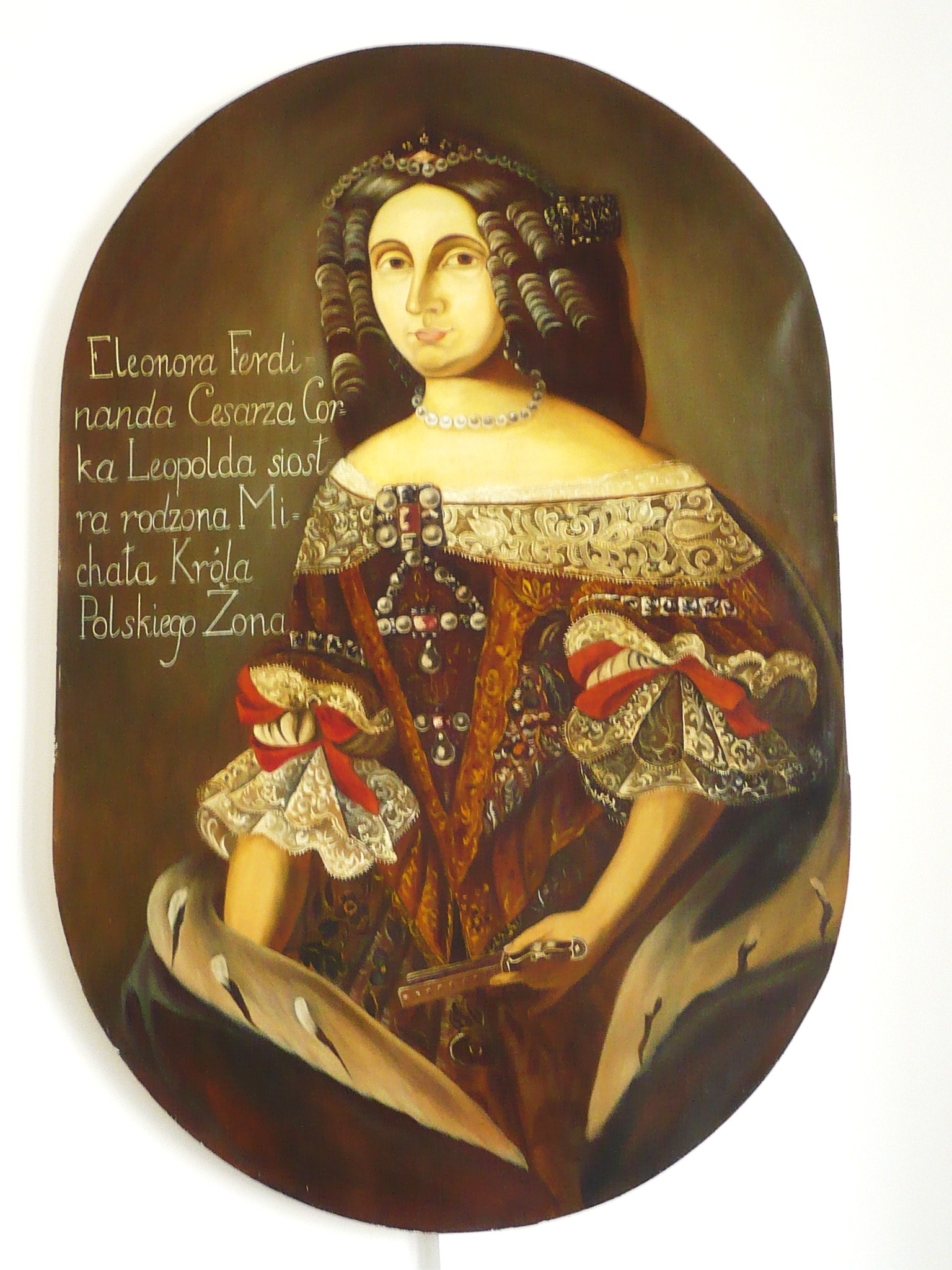
Portrait of Eleonore of Austria

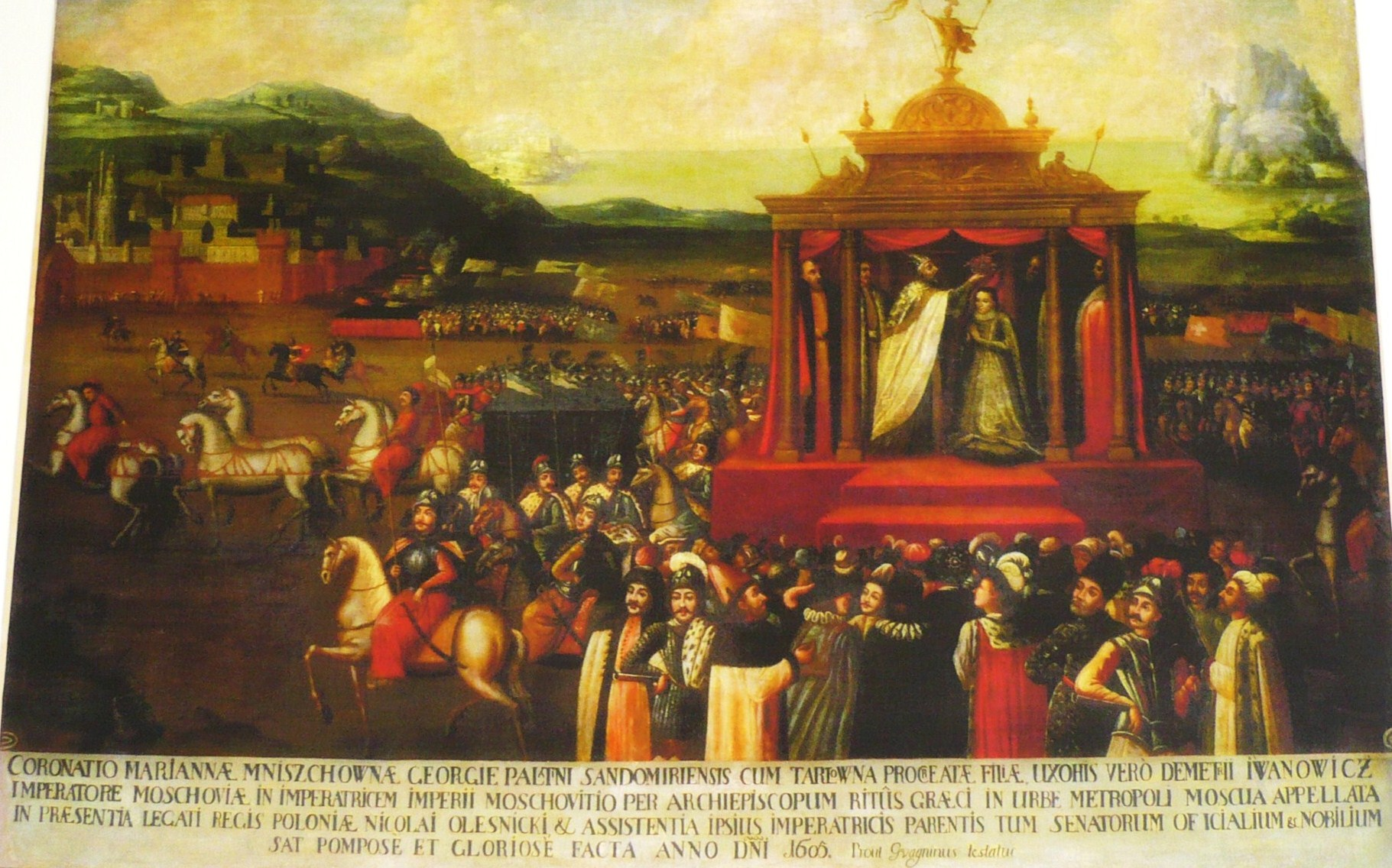
Painting in the palace

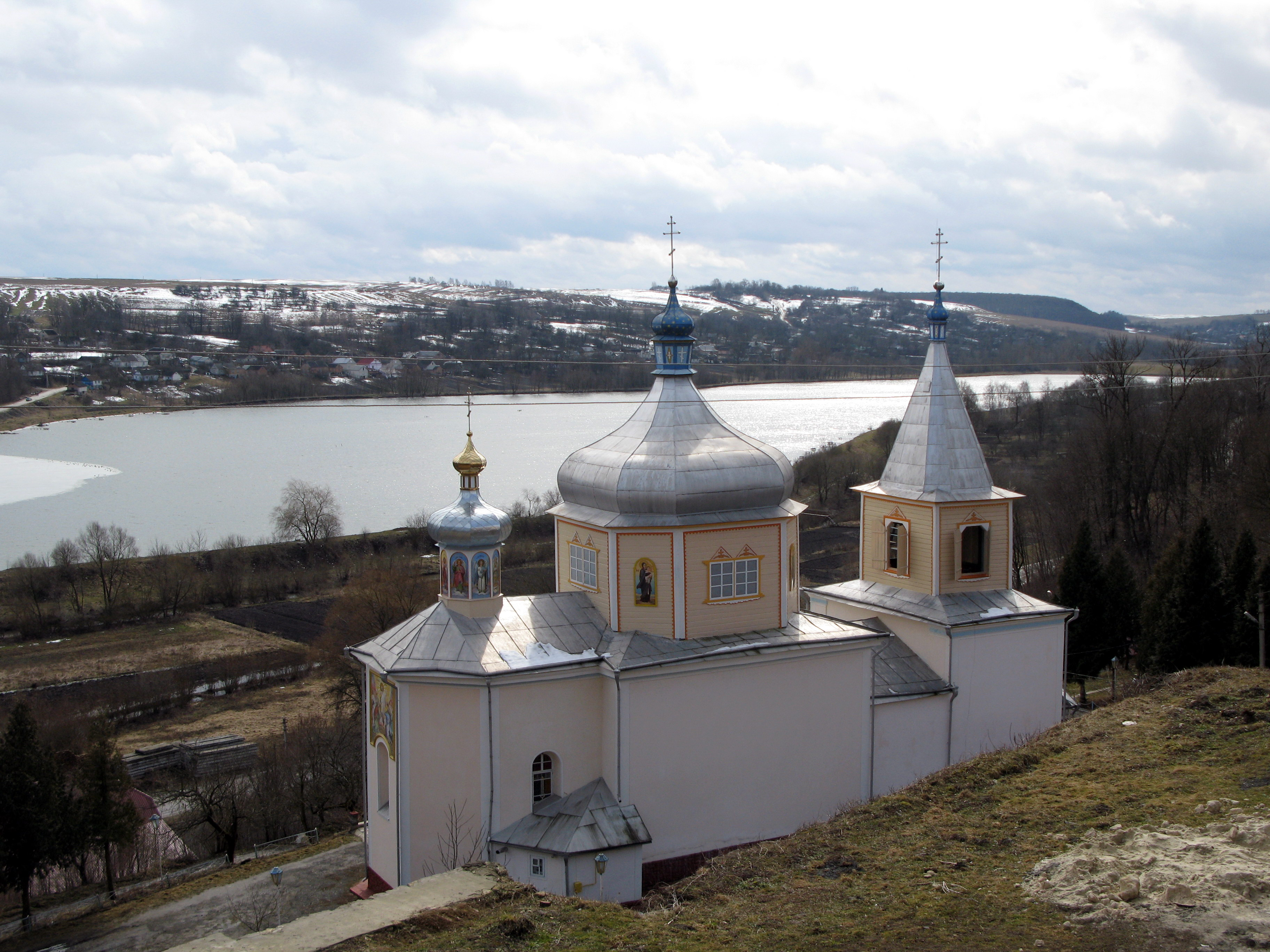
Ascension Church

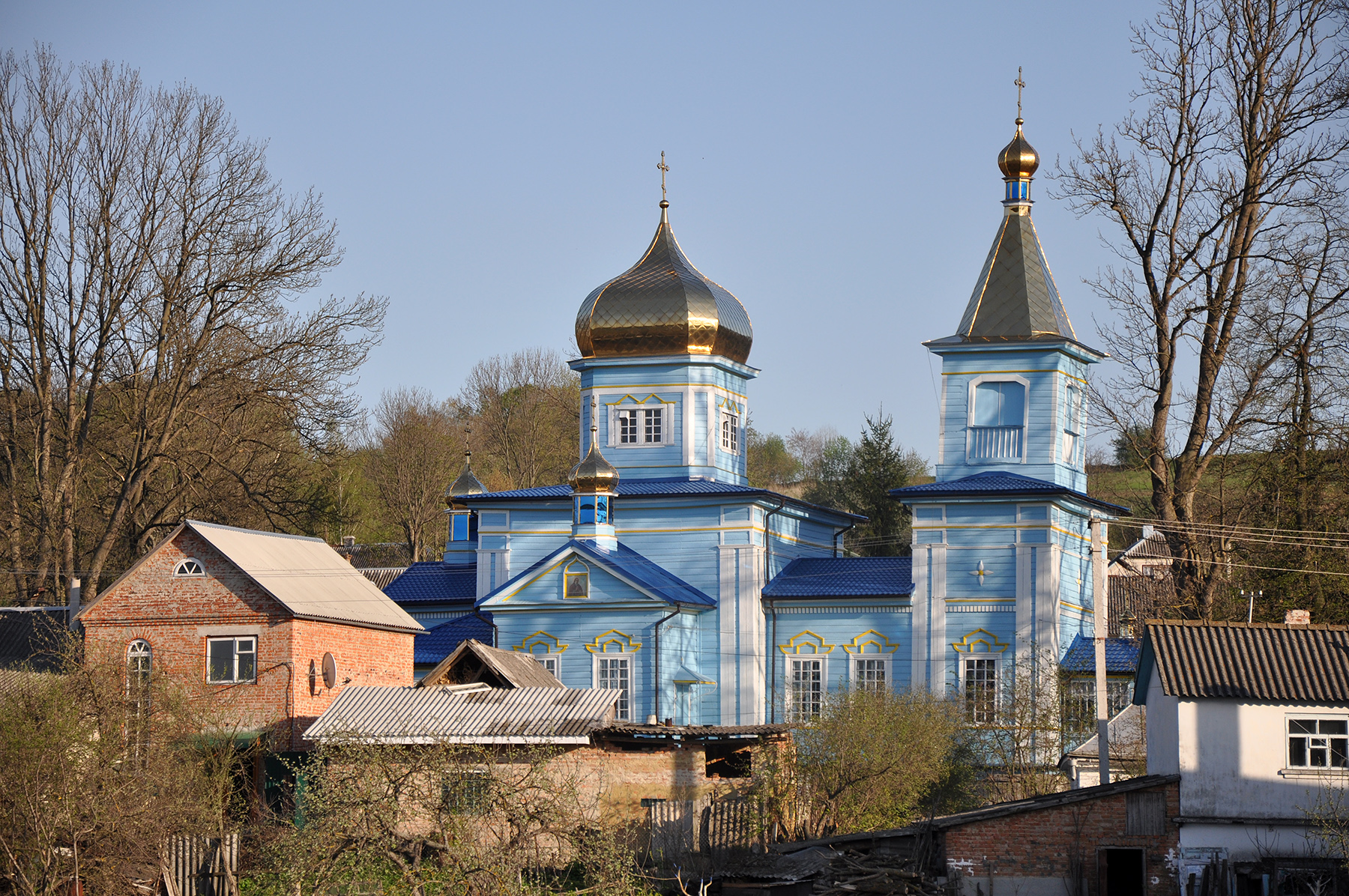
Church of the Nativity of the Blessed Virgin Mary

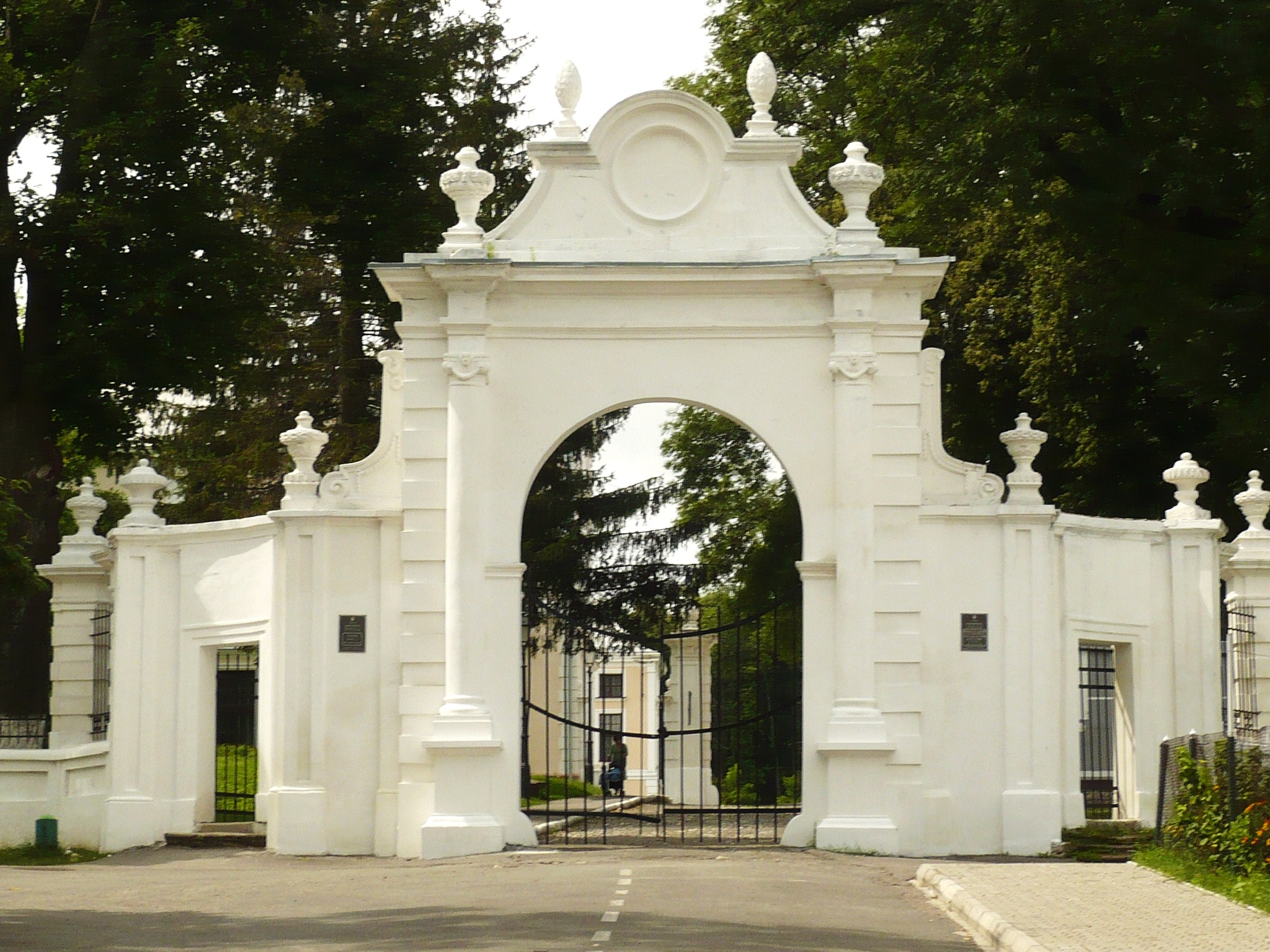
Gate

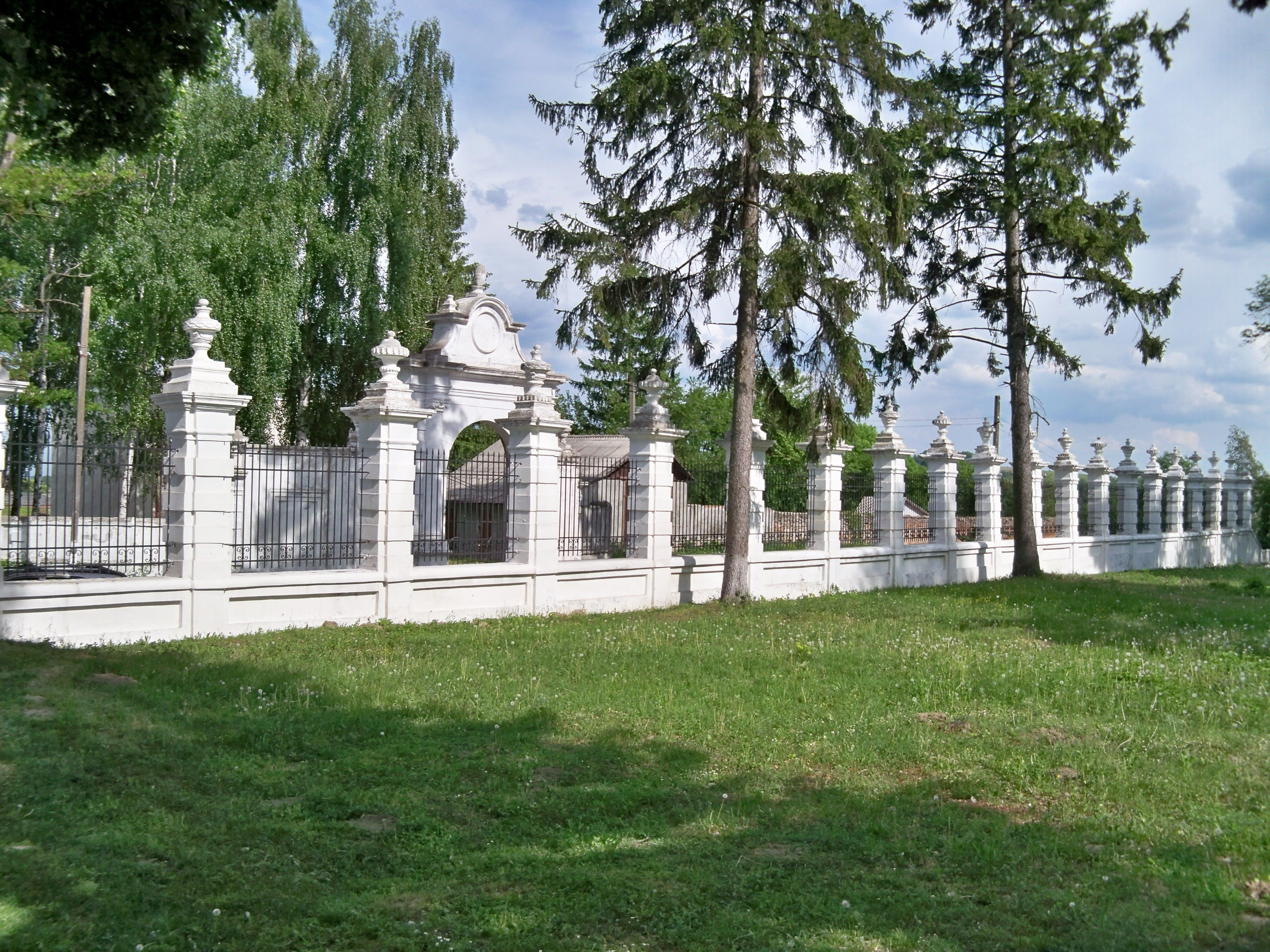
Fence of Vyshnivets Park

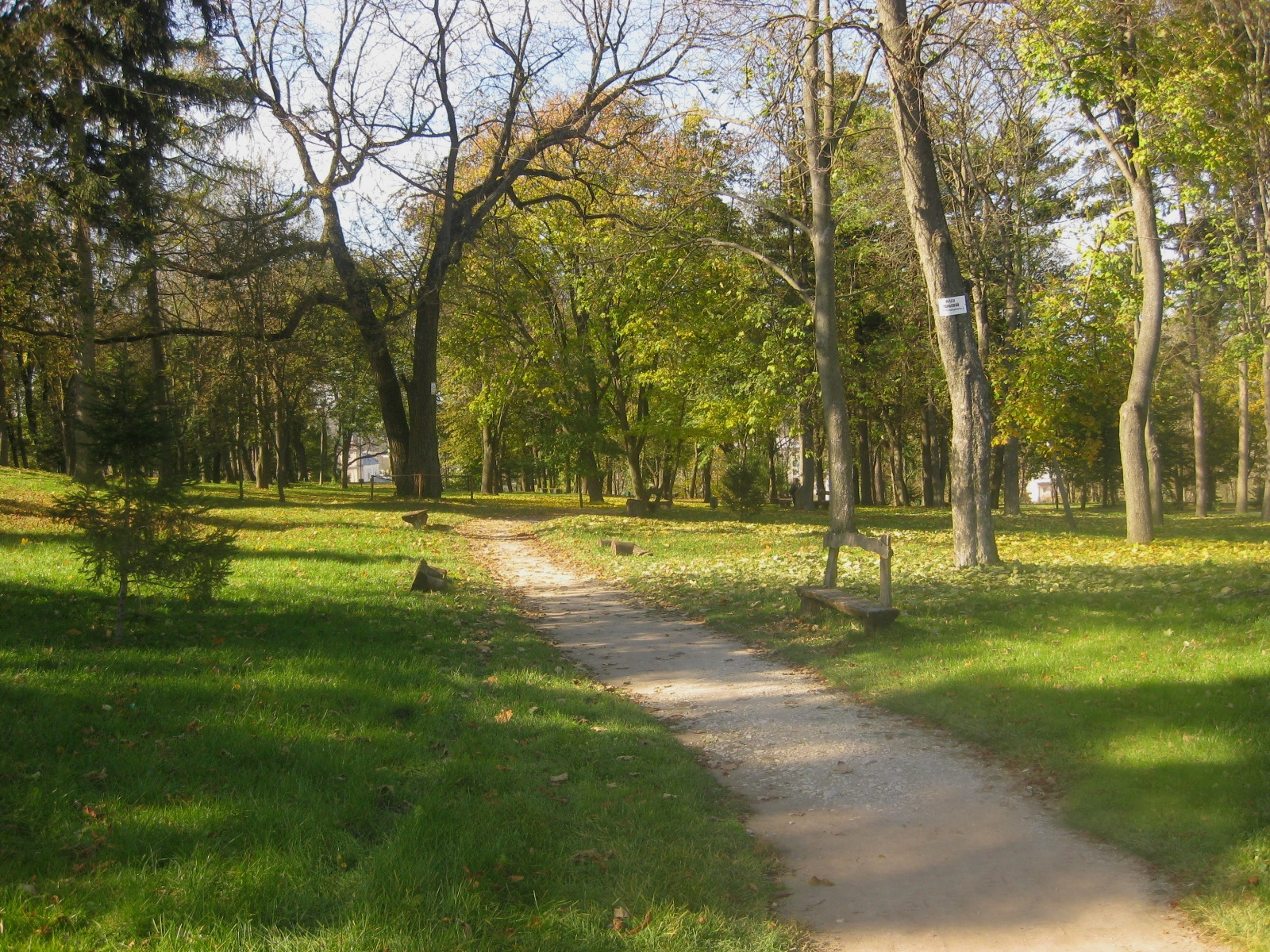
Vyshnivets Park

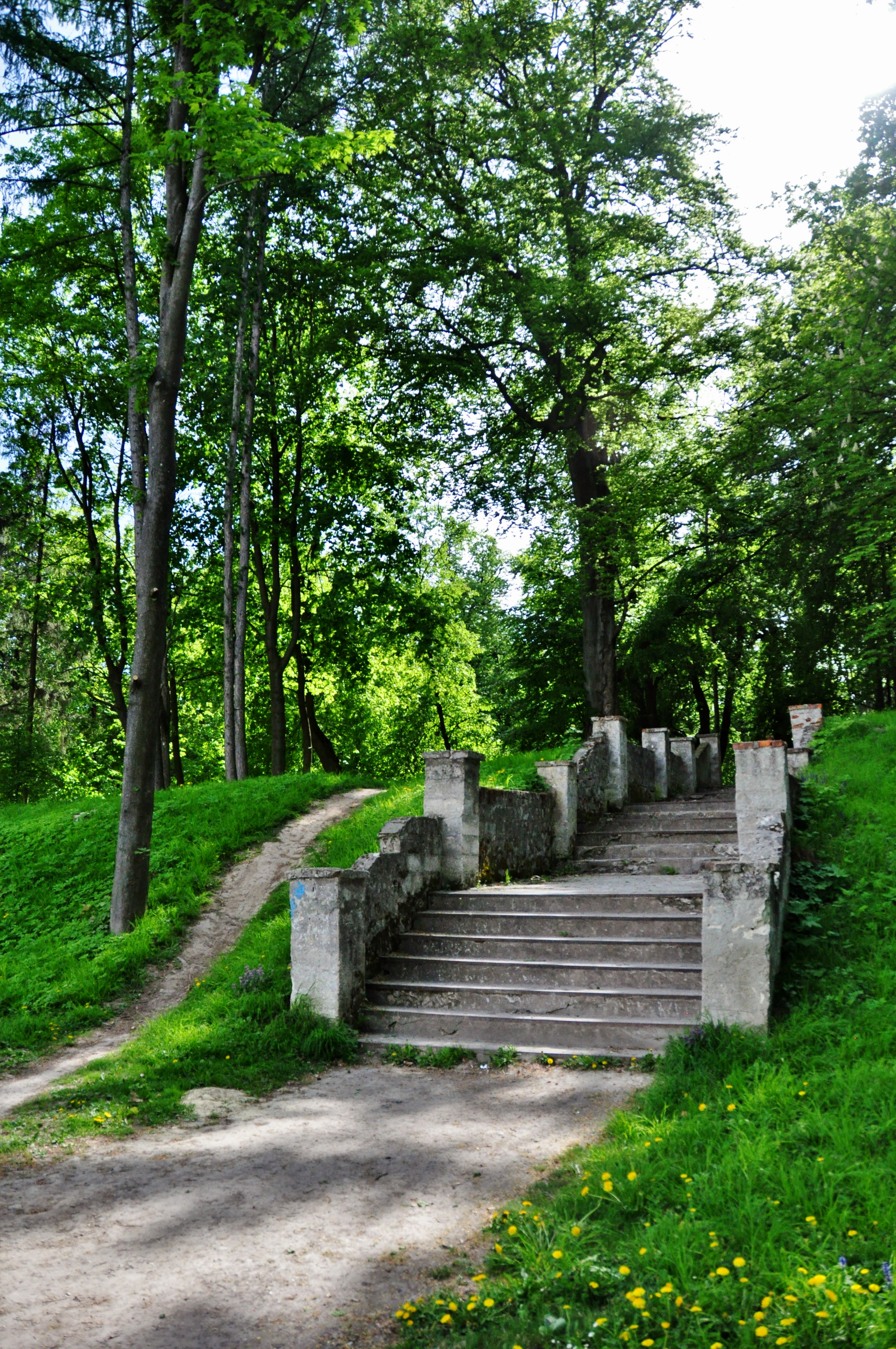
Stairs in the park

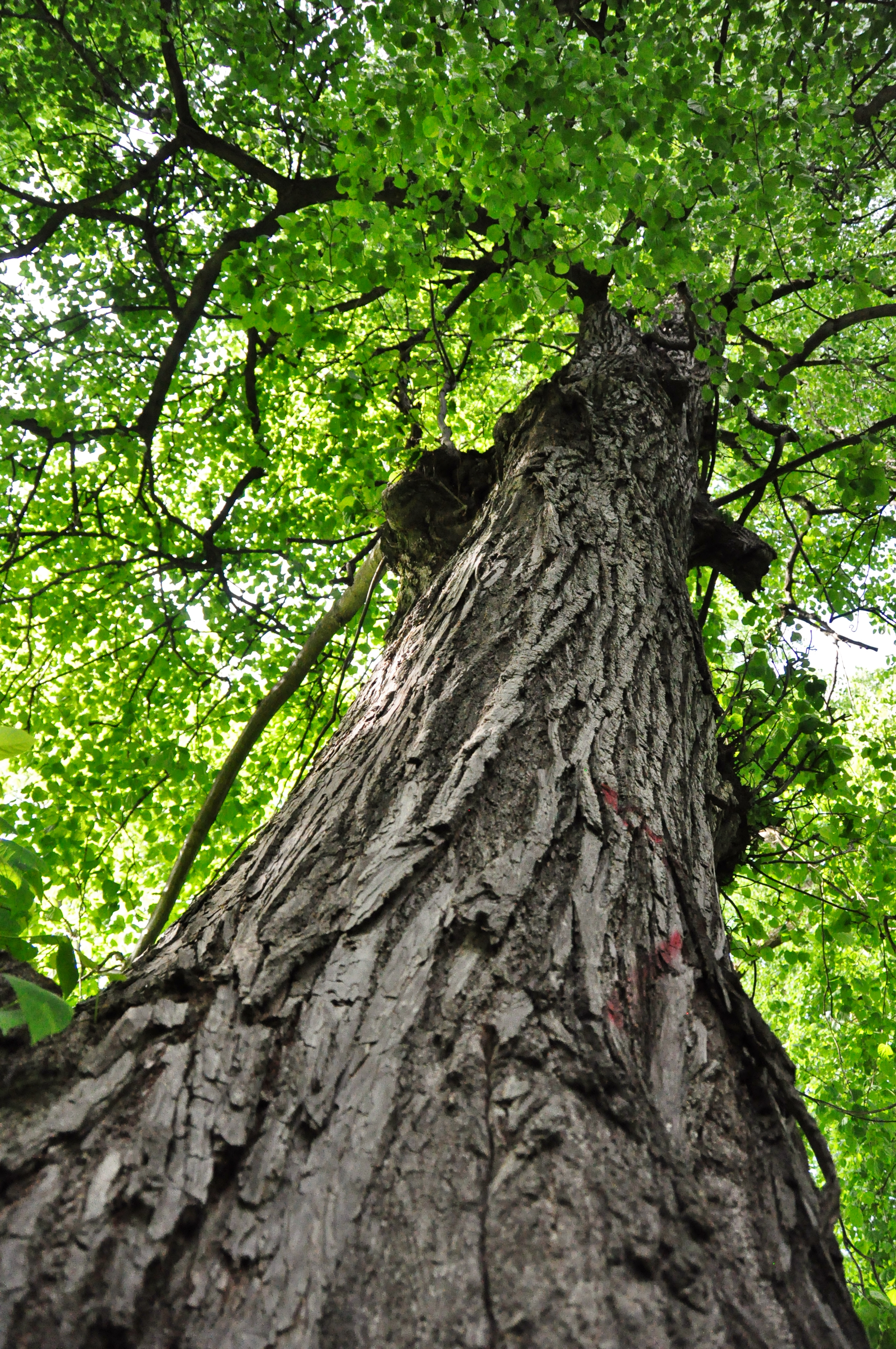
Linden tree in the park

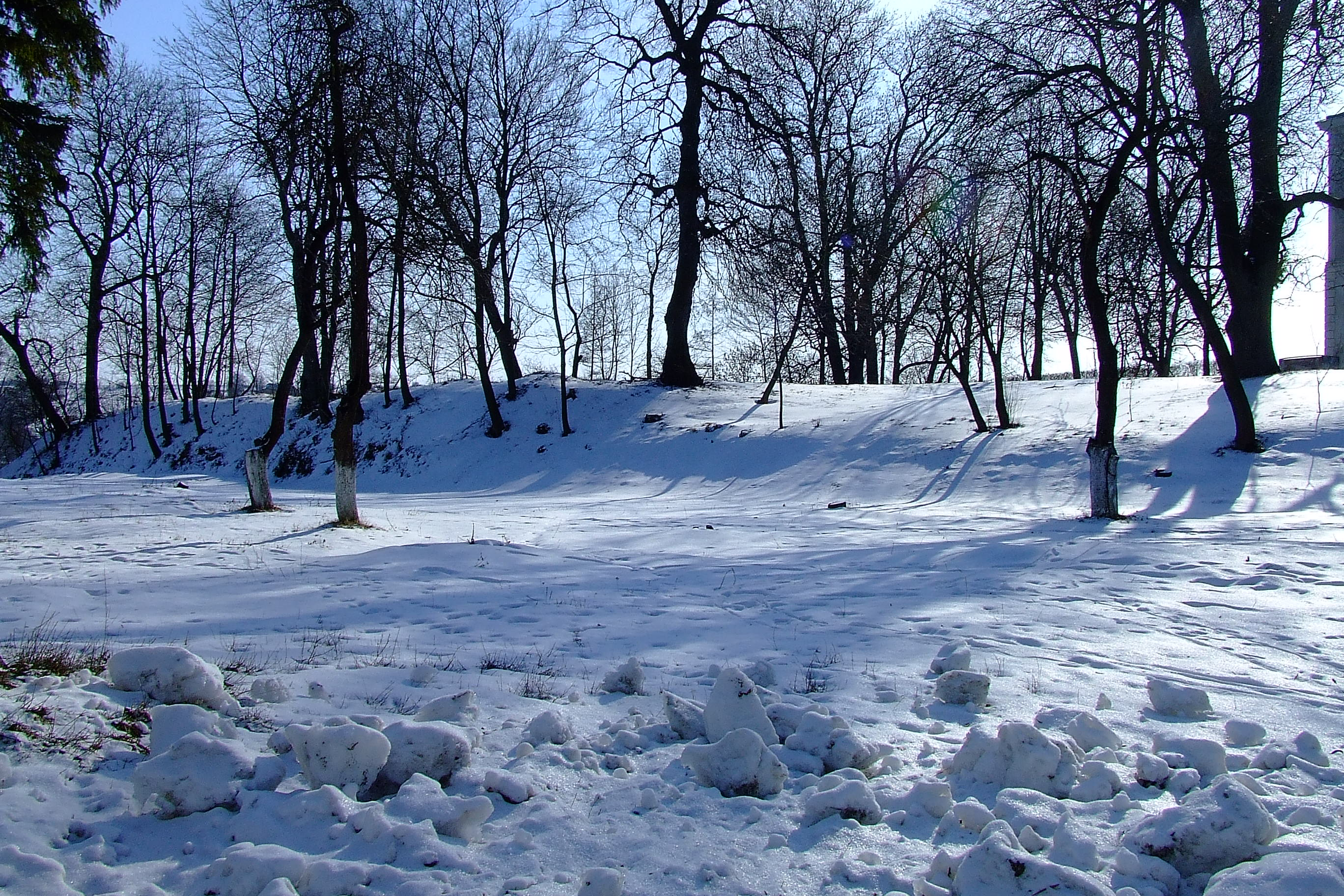
Vyshnivets Park in winter
