= Zaluzhzhia, Zbarazh urban hromada, Ternopil Raion, Ternopil Oblast =

Rural locality in Ternopil Oblast, Ukraine

Zaluzhzhia Залужжя
- Village
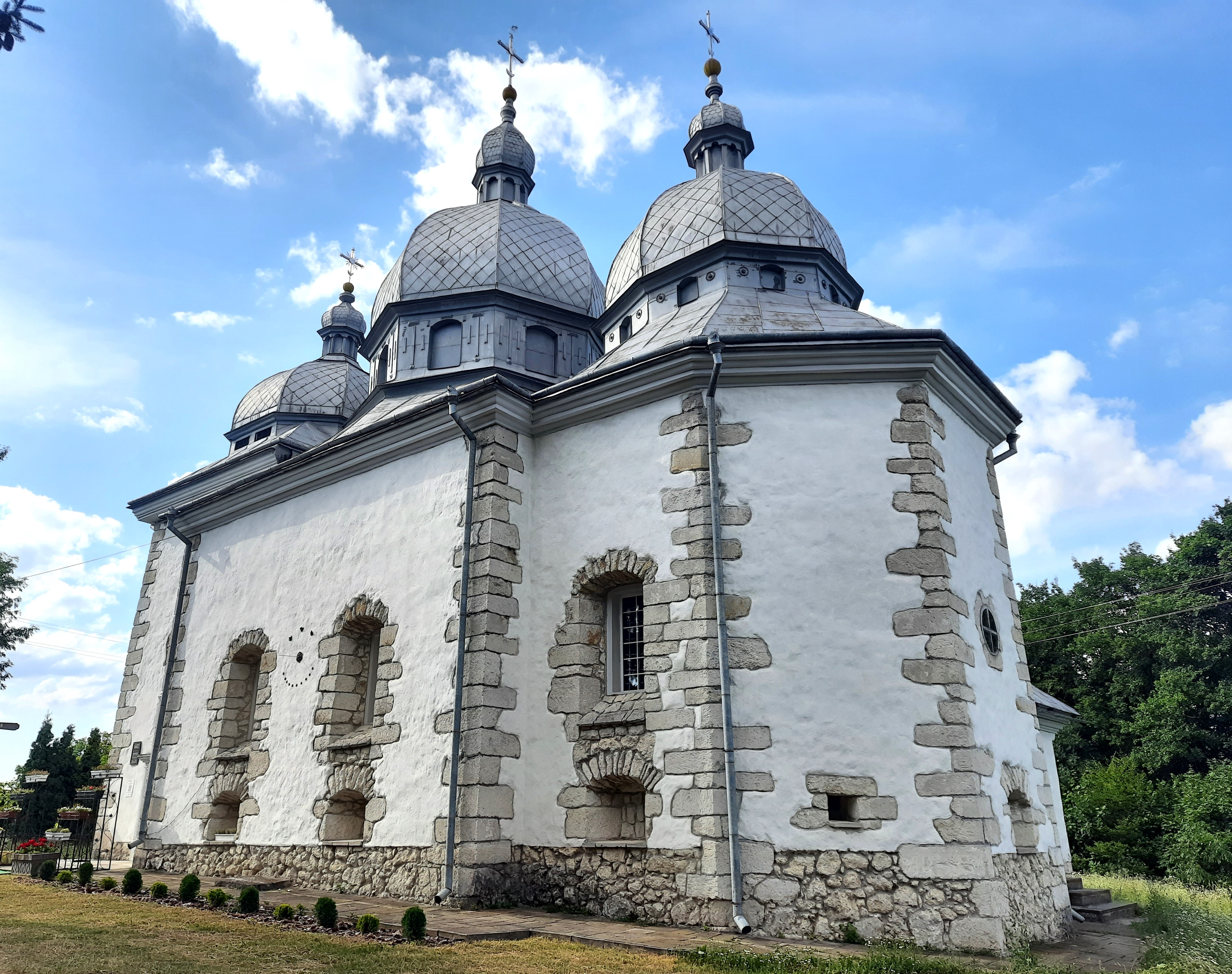
- Fortified Transfiguration Church

- Location in Ternopil Oblast
- Coordinates: 49°40′19″N 25°45′4″E
- Country: Ukraine
- Oblast: Ternopil Oblast
- Raion: Ternopil Raion
- Hromada: Zbarazh urban hromada
- Time zone: UTC+2 (EET)
  - Summer (DST): UTC+3 (EEST)
- Postal code: 47304

Zaluzhzhia (Ukrainian: Залужжя) is a village in the Zbarazh urban hromada of the Ternopil Raion of Ternopil Oblast in Ukraine.

== History ==
The first written mention of the village was in 1444.

After the liquidation of the Zbarazh Raion on 19 July 2020, the village became part of the Ternopil Raion.

== Religion ==
- Church of the Transfiguration (1600, OCU, brick, restored in 1989; architectural monument of national importance),
- Church of the Transfiguration (1996, UGCC, brick),
- Roman Catholic Church of St. Rosalia (1914, reconstructed in 1926),
- Monastery of Onufriy the Great (late 17th – mid-18th centuries).

== Notable residents ==
The village was visited by Ivan Franko.

== Sources ==
- (in Ukrainian) Григорчук Г., Уніят В., Хаварівський Б., Залужжя // Ternopil Encyclopedic Dictionary: in 4 v. / editorial board: H. Yavorskyi and other, Ternopil: "Zbruch", 2004, V. 1: А—Й, S. 613. — ISBN 966-528-197-6.
- "Załuże 7) wieś, powiat zbaraski". Geographical Dictionary of the Kingdom of Poland (in Polish). 14. Warszawa: Kasa im. Józefa Mianowskiego. 1895. p. 362.
