= Skalat Castle =

Castle in Skalat, Ternopil Oblast, Ukraine

- Скалатський замок
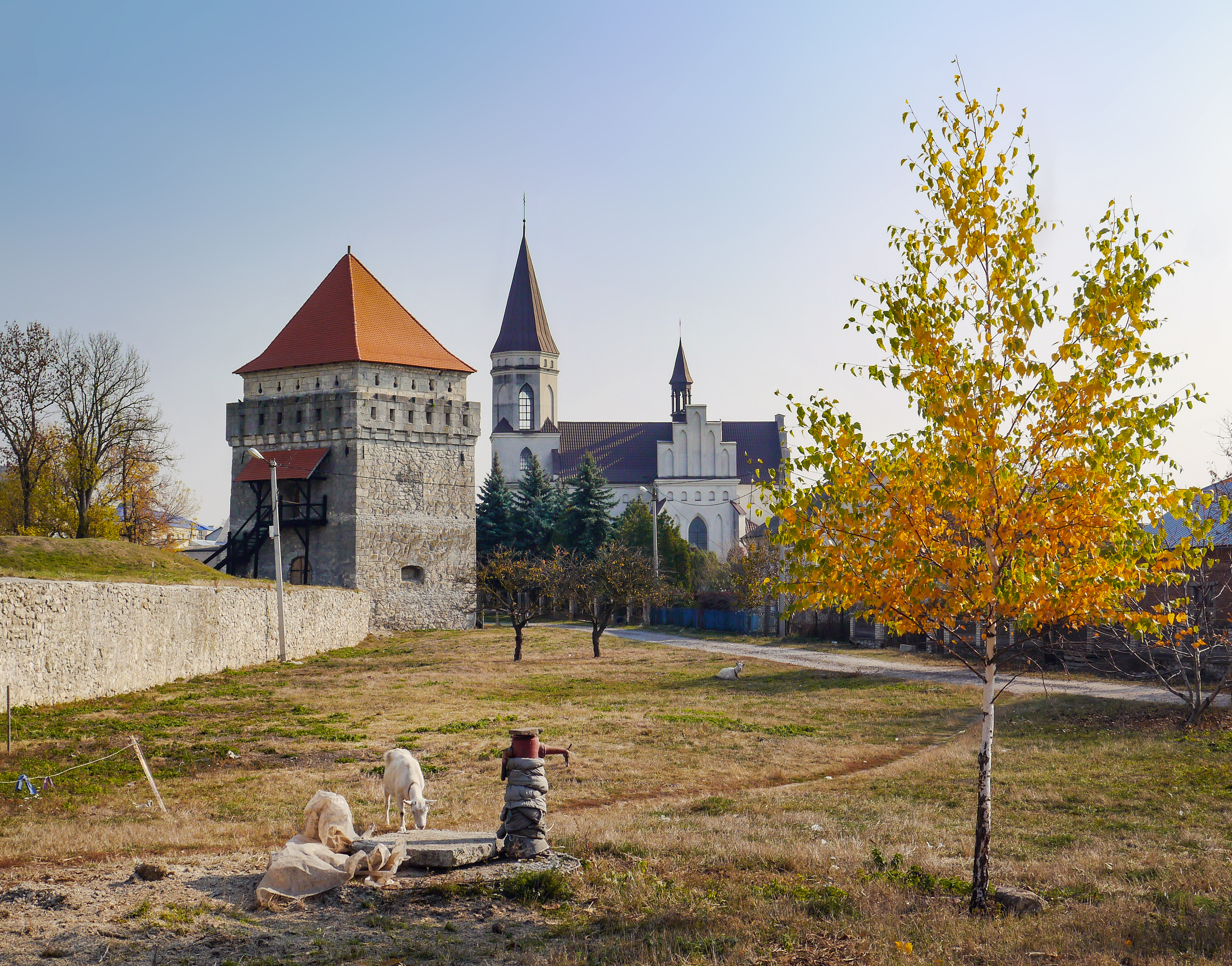
- Skalat Castle

General information
- Location: Skalat, Ternopil Raion, Ternopil Oblast, Ukraine
- Coordinates: 49°25′34″N 25°58′23″E

Immovable Monument of National Significance of Ukraine
- Official name: Замок (Castle)
- Type: Architecture
- Reference no.: 190012

The Skalat Castle (Ukrainian: Скалатський замок, romanized: Skalats'kyi zamok) is located in Skalat, Ternopil Raion, Ternopil Oblast, Ukraine. The castle was built around 1630, by Krzysztof Wichrowski, the swordbearer of Halych, and an architectural monument of national importance.

== History ==
The castle was destroyed during the Cossack wars and was not rebuilt until the 18th century. The stronghold was completely destroyed during World War I.

== Owners ==
The castle successively passed into the hands of the Chodkiewicz, Korecki and Wichrowski families. Wichrowski's daughter Weronika married Sanok castellan Jan Firlej. Then: Firlej's, Scipio del Campo, Kalinowski's, Anna Kalinowska (née Lanckorońska), and Poniatowski. In the 18th century it was owned by Maria née Wodzicki Scypionowa, and from 1869 the castle was ruled by Suesskind Rozenstock and his sons, who held it until World War I.

== Architecture ==
The castle was founded on a quadrilateral plan with five-sided towers at the corners. The entrance to the castle led through a stone gate with two wickets on the sides, on which were placed stone slabs with the history of the building and also a sculpture of a knight standing on top of the gate. This knight is leaning on a shield bearing the coats of arms of Jelita, Rawicz, Leliwa and Scypion. This part of the castle dates back to 1795. By the end of the 19th century there were defensive moats and ramparts, as well as a brick entrance gate, the top of which is decorated with three stone figures. A residential house stood inside the ramparts; the current owners erected a beautiful and spacious brick house here. Everything that exists today is the result of reconstruction carried out in the interwar period.

== Bibliography ==
- Filip Sulimierski, Bronisław Chlebowski]], Władysław Walewski, Słownik geograficzny Królestwa Polskiego i innych krajów słowiańskich, t. X, Warszawa, 1880–1902, s. 664.
- Aleksander Strojny; Krzysztof Bzowski; Artur Grossman (2005). Ukraina zachodnia: tam szum Prutu, Czeremoszu... Kraków: Wyd. Bezdroża. p. 282. ISBN 83-921981-6-6. OCLC 750033004.
