= Monuments of national significance in Ternopil Oblast =

Cultural heritage plaque of the Zbarazh Castle

The State Register of Immovable Monuments of Ukraine classifies cultural heritage monuments as either of local or national significance. (Note: 'Monuments of national significance' may also be translated as 'monuments of national importance'; Ukrainian: пам'ятки національного значення) To be classified as nationally significant, a monument must have had a substantial impact on Ukraine's culture, been associated with major historical events or individuals who shaped national culture, represented a masterpiece of creative genius, or embodied a disappeared civilisation or disappeared artistic style. Monuments of national significance are inscribed on the register by the Cabinet of Ministers, and are protected and maintained by the Ministry of Culture. All listed monuments belong to at least one of the following categories: archaeology, history, monumental art, architecture, urban planning, garden and park art, landscape, or science and technology. (Note: The categories are defined as such: Archaeological monuments are underground or underwater remains of human activity that bear testimony to the origin or development of civilisation.; Historic monuments are buildings, structures, burials, and other sites associated with important historical events or the lives and activities of prominent individuals.; Monuments of monumental art are works of fine art.; Architectural monuments are buildings and structures that retain full or partial authenticity and express characteristics of a particular culture, era, style, construction technique, or represent works of renowned architects.; Urban planning monuments are historic neighbourhoods, streets, squares, or ensembles with preserved spatial layouts and architectural integrity.; Monuments of garden and park art combine park construction with natural or anthropogenic landscapes.; Landscape monuments are natural areas possessing historical value.; Monuments of science and technology are industrial, engineering, or scientific sites that reflect the scientific and technological development of an era or discipline.)

The first attempts to establish registers of protected buildings were undertaken in 1917 and 1918 by the Ukrainian People's Republic. These efforts continued in the 1920s in Soviet Ukraine, culminating in the listing of thousands of monuments, but were halted in the 1930s with the dissolution of relevant institutions and the active destruction of cultural—particularly religious—heritage. The listing of cultural heritage monuments in the region was renewed in 1956. A list of architectural monuments was approved in 1963, followed by a separate list of artistic, historic, and archaeological monuments in 1965. Both lists remained in use after Ukraine declared independence in 1991. On 8 June 2000, the State Register of Immovable Monuments was established with the adoption of the law On the Protection of Cultural Heritage. All entries from the Soviet-era list of artistic, historic, and archaeological monuments were transferred to the new register on 14 September 2009. The transfer of monuments from the Soviet architectural register, however, has proceeded more slowly and remains incomplete as of 2026, although the process has accelerated in recent years. At the same time, a number of sites have been deprived of their protected status to comply with decommunisation and derussification laws in effect since 2015 and 2023, respectively.

Ternopil Oblast is located in western Ukraine and contains 144 monuments of national significance. (Note: Six monuments of national significance in the oblast remain on the Soviet-era register. They are included in this list and are marked with a dagger (†).) It is divided into three raions (districts) – Chortkiv, Kremenets, and Ternopil – which include 54, 35, and 55 monuments of national significance, respectively. Of the total, 137 are classified as architectural monuments, 18 as historic, 4 as archaeological, and 3 as garden and park art, with 17 monuments belonging to multiple categories. Most of the architectural monuments date from the 16th to the 18th centuries. The latest inscriptions date to February 2026.

== Chortkiv Raion ==
† Remaining on the Soviet-era register

Monuments of national significance in Chortkiv Raion
Name (Note: The names listed are unofficial translations as the register is only available in Ukrainian. The official Ukrainian names are shown below each translation, with links to the corresponding Ukrainian Wikipedia articles if applicable.)	Location	Date constructed (Note: Datings of the monuments as indicated on the register)	Date designated (Note: For monuments previously listed on a Soviet-era register, the date of transfer to the modern register is indicated.)	Coordinates	Type	Protection number (Note: Every monument is assigned a unique protection number, and those of national significance located in Ternopil Oblast start with the digits 19.)	Photo	Ref.
Park Парк	Bilche-Zolote	17th–18th centuries	25 February 2026	48.77891°N 25.88350°E	Architectural	190084	More images	
Bell tower (wooden) Дзвіниця (дер.)	Biliavyntsi	18th century	25 February 2026	49.14843°N 25.36749°E	Architectural	190080	More images	
Church (stone) Костел (мур.)	Borshchiv	Late 18th century	25 February 2026	48.80144°N 26.03729°E	Architectural	190069	More images	
Intercession Church (stone) Покровська церква (мур.)	Buchach	1755–1764	25 February 2026	49.06269°N 25.39843°E	Architectural	190073	More images	
Castle (stone) Замок (мур.)	Buchach	14th century	25 February 2026	49.05992°N 25.39155°E	Architectural	190074	More images	
Basilian Monastery (stone) Василіанський монастир (мур.)	Buchach	1753–1777	25 February 2026	49.06021°N 25.39690°E	Architectural	190075	More images	
Basilian Church and cells Василіанська церква та келії	Buchach	1753–1770	25 February 2026	49.06024°N 25.39654°E	Architectural	190075/1	More images	
Bell tower Дзвіниця (мур.)	Buchach	1753–1770	25 February 2026	49.06068°N 25.39629°E	Architectural	190075/2	More images	
Church (stone) Костел (мур.)	Buchach	1763	25 February 2026	49.06152°N 25.39352°E	Architectural	190076	More images	
St Nicholas Church and bell tower (stone) Миколаївська церква та дзвіниця (мур.)	Buchach	1610	25 February 2026	49.06362°N 25.39365°E	Architectural	190077	More images	
City Hall (stone) Ратуша (мур.)	Buchach	1750	25 February 2026	49.06238°N 25.39491°E	Architectural	190078	More images	
Church in Monastyrok Tract (ruins) (stone) Церква в урочищі Монастирок (руїни) (мур.)	Buchach	16th century	25 February 2026	49.03334°N 25.40090°E	Architectural	190079	More images	
Castle Замок	Chortkiv	17th century	19 March 2025	49.02160°N 25.80252°E	Architectural	190020	More images	
Ascension Church (wooden) Вознесенська церква (дер.)	Chortkiv	1717	25 February 2026	49.02468°N 25.79300°E	Architectural	190067	More images	
Dormition Church (wooden) Успенська церква (дер.)	Chortkiv	1635	25 February 2026	49.01732°N 25.79520°E	Architectural	190068	More images	
Hillfort ramparts Вали городища	Dzvenyhorod	9th century	25 February 2026	48.54005°N 26.27819°E	Architectural	190090	More images	
Church and bell tower (stone) Церква та дзвіниця (мур.)	Dzvenyhorod	1801	25 February 2026	48.54113°N 26.27671°E	Architectural	190091	More images	
Hillfort sanctuary "Horodnytsia" Городище-святилище "Городниця"	Horodnytsia	9th–13th centuries	14 September 2009	49.18518°N 26.16522°E	Archaeological	190001-Н	More images	
St Onuphrius Church (stone) Онуфріївська церква (мур.)	Husiatyn	16th century	25 February 2026	49.07147°N 26.20879°E	Architectural	190099	More images	
Synagogue Синагога	Husiatyn	Late 16th–17th centuries	25 February 2026	49.07297°N 26.20851°E	Architectural	190100	More images	
Bernardine Church with cells Костел бернардинів з келіями	Husiatyn	1610	25 February 2026	49.06969°N 26.20397°E	Architectural	190101	More images	
Church and bell tower of St John the Evangelist (wooden) Церква та дзвіниця Йоана Богослова (дер.)	Ivane-Puste	1775	25 February 2026	48.64202°N 26.18677°E	Architectural	190094	More images	
St George's Church (stone) Георгіївська церква (мур.)	Kasperivtsi	16th century	25 February 2026	48.66186°N 25.84543°E	Architectural	190095	More images	
Church and bell tower (wooden) Церква та дзвіниця (дер.)	Kopychyntsi	1630	25 February 2026	49.09742°N 25.91173°E	Architectural	190083	More images	
Church and bell tower (stone) Церква та дзвіниця (мур.)	Koshylivtsi	1746	25 February 2026	48.87433°N 25.57848°E	Architectural	190096	More images	
Church and bell tower (wooden) Церква та дзвіниця (дер.)	Kozyna	17th century	25 February 2026	49.29150°N 26.25200°E	Architectural	190089	More images	
Church of St Paraskeva and bell tower (wooden) Церква Параскеви та дзвіниця (дер.)	Krohulets	18th century	25 February 2026	49.10016°N 26.00629°E	Architectural	190098	More images	
Hillfort sanctuary "Krutyliv" Городище-святилище "Крутилів"	Krutyliv	9th–13th centuries	14 September 2009	49.22014°N 26.18801°E	Archaeological	190002-Н	More images	
Castle Замок	Kryvche	1639–1650	19 March 2025	48.70003°N 26.09986°E	Architectural	190021	More images	
Castle (ruins) (stone) Замок (руїни) (мур.)	Kudryntsi	Early 17th century	25 February 2026	48.62207°N 26.29161°E	Architectural	190092	More images	
Old Slavic cave temple ("Pagan Sanctuary") with the sacrificial rock (Dovbush's Rock) Давньослов'янський печерний храм ("Святиня поганська") з жертовним каменем (камінь Довбуша)	Monastyrok	11th–12th centuries	25 February 2026	48.73329°N 25.85328°E	Architectural	190085	More images	
Exaltation of the Holy Cross Church (stone) Здвиженська церква (мур.)	Monastyrok	18th century	25 February 2026	48.73132°N 25.85465°E	Architectural	190086	More images	
Cells (stone) Келії (мур.)	Monastyrok	16th century	25 February 2026	48.73108°N 25.85456°E	Architectural	190087	More images	
Church (wooden) † Церква (дер.)	Nahirianka (Note: The location is erroneously identified as the village of Yahilnytsia on the register.)	18th century	24 August 1963	48.93746°N 25.73877°E	Architectural	691	More images	
St Nicholas Church and bell tower (stone) Миколаївська церква та дзвіниця (мур.)	Nahoriany	17th century	25 February 2026	48.80014°N 25.60199°E	Architectural	190097	More images	
Trinity Fortress (ruins) (stone) Фортеця Трійці (руїни) (мур.)	Okopy	1692	25 February 2026	48.53985°N 26.41491°E	Architectural	190093	More images	
Lviv Gate (stone) Львівська брама (мур.)	Okopy	1692	25 February 2026	48.53977°N 26.41131°E	Architectural	190093/1	More images	
Kamianets Gate (stone) Кам'янецька брама (мур.)	Okopy	1692	25 February 2026	48.53971°N 26.41863°E	Architectural	190093/2	More images	
Walls (stone) Мури (мур.)	Okopy	1692	25 February 2026	48.54075°N 26.41267°E	Architectural	190093/3	More images	
Castle Замок	Pidzamochok	1600	19 March 2025	49.07946°N 25.39870°E	Architectural	190018	More images	
Church (wooden) Церква (дер.)	Sapohiv	1777	25 February 2026	48.72713°N 26.08274°E	Architectural	190072	More images	
Castle Замок	Skala-Podilska	1518	19 March 2025	48.85688°N 26.19917°E	Architectural	190019	More images	
Castle (stone) Замок (мур.)	Sydoriv	17th century	25 February 2026	49.00744°N 26.17004°E	Architectural	190102	More images	
Church (stone) Костел (мур.)	Sydoriv	1730	25 February 2026	49.01059°N 26.17160°E	Architectural	190103	More images	
Church (wooden) Церква (дер.)	Volytsia	17th century	25 February 2026	49.27469°N 26.22105°E	Architectural	190088	More images	
Castle (ruins) (stone) Замок (руїни) (мур.)	Vysichka	17th–18th centuries	25 February 2026	48.78663°N 25.98769°E	Architectural	190070	More images	
Church (wooden) Церква (дер.)	Vysichka	1763	25 February 2026	48.78966°N 25.98578°E	Architectural	190071	More images	
Palace (Monastery) Палац (Монастир)	Yazlovets	17th–18th centuries, 19th century	24 January 2024	48.95772°N 25.43820°E	Architectural	190006 (Note: The protection number 190006 is shared between the palace in Yazlovets and the city hall in Berezhany.)	More images	
Castle Замок	Yazlovets	15th century	19 March 2025	48.95720°N 25.44056°E	Architectural	190014	More images	
St Nicholas Church (stone) Миколаївська церква (мур.)	Yazlovets	1551	25 February 2026	48.96125°N 25.44396°E	Architectural	190081	More images	
Church Костел	Yazlovets	1590	25 February 2026	48.95932°N 25.44112°E	Architectural	190082	More images	
Grave of the writer O. S. Makovei Могила письменника О. С. Маковея	Zalishchyky	1925	14 September 2009	48.64285°N 25.73751°E	Historic	190003-Н	More images	
Castle ruins (Note: Despite what its name suggests, this listing refers to the St Nicholas Church, not to a castle.) † Руїни замку	Zbruchanske	17th century	6 September 1979	48.66653°N 26.25883°E	Architectural	1565	More images	
Castle Замок	Zolotyi Potik	1639–1650	19 March 2025	48.90454°N 25.34029°E	Architectural	190017	More images	

== Kremenets Raion ==
† Remaining on the Soviet-era register

Monuments of national significance in Kremenets Raion
Name	Location	Date constructed	Date designated	Coordinates	Type	Protection number	Photo	Ref.
Bell tower (wooden) Дзвіниця (дер.)	Bashuky	18th century	25 February 2026	49.82149°N 25.53271°E	Architectural	190064	More images	
Residential building (wooden) † Жилий будинок (дер.)	Kremenets	18th century	6 September 1979	50.09259°N 25.72252°E	Architectural	1592	More images	
Cossack cemetery Козацьке кладовище	Kremenets	1648–1651	14 September 2009	50.10232°N 25.73258°E	Historic	190004-Н	More images	
Castle, ruins Замок, руїни	Kremenets	9th–16th centuries	19 March 2025	50.09469°N 25.73071°E	Architectural	190023	More images	
Ensemble of lyceum and church Ансамбль ліцею з костьолом"	Kremenets	1731–1743	19 March 2025	50.09639°N 25.72443°E	Architectural	190024	More images	
St Ignatius of Loyola Church Костел св. Ігнатія Лойоли	Kremenets	1743	19 March 2025	50.09627°N 25.72447°E	Architectural	190024/1	More images	
South educational building Південний навчальний корпус	Kremenets	1743	19 March 2025	50.09596°N 25.72457°E	Architectural	190024/2	More images	
North educational building Північний навчальний корпус	Kremenets	1743	19 March 2025	50.09665°N 25.72466°E	Architectural	190024/3	More images	
Building complex of St Nicholas Cathedral and cells Комплекс споруд Миколаївського собору з келіями	Kremenets	16th–18th centuries	19 March 2025	50.09650°N 25.72691°E	Architectural	190025	More images	
St Nicholas Cathedral Миколаївський собор	Kremenets	16th–18th centuries	19 March 2025	50.09616°N 25.72668°E	Architectural	190025/1	More images	
Cells Келії	Kremenets	18th century	19 March 2025	50.09644°N 25.72714°E	Architectural	190025/2	More images	
Residential building Житловий будинок	Kremenets	18th century	19 March 2025	50.09724°N 25.72855°E	Architectural	190026	More images	
Residential building "Twins" Житловий будинок "Близнята"	Kremenets	18th century	19 March 2025	50.09573°N 25.72542°E	Architectural	190027	More images	
Building complex of the Epiphany Monastery Комплекс споруд Богоявленського монастиря	Kremenets	1760–1914	19 March 2025	50.10328°N 25.72650°E	Architectural	190028	More images	
Epiphany Cathedral Богоявленський собор	Kremenets	1760	19 March 2025	50.10290°N 25.72760°E	Architectural	190028/1	More images	
Cells building Корпус келій	Kremenets	1760	19 March 2025	50.10304°N 25.72738°E	Architectural	190028/2	More images	
Bell tower Дзвіниця	Kremenets	20th century	19 March 2025	50.10332°N 25.72820°E	Architectural	190028/3	More images	
House and Museum of J. Słowacki (stone) Будинок-музей Ю. Словацького (мур.)	Kremenets	Late 18th century	25 February 2026	50.09513°N 25.72200°E	Architectural	190060	More images	
Church (wooden) Церква (дер.)	Novostav	1786	25 February 2026	50.06629°N 26.03394°E	Architectural	190066	More images	
Chapel † Каплиця	Pidlistsi	17th century	24 August 1963	50.10035°N 25.68966°E	Architectural	674	More images	
Building complex of Pochaiv Holy Dormition Lavra Комплекс споруд Почаївської Свято-Успенської Лаври	Pochaiv	16th–20th centuries	19 March 2025	50.00702°N 25.50677°E	Architectural	190029	More images	
Dormition Cathedral Успенський собор	Pochaiv	1771–1783	19 March 2025	50.00483°N 25.50663°E	Architectural	190029/1	More images	
Trinity Cathedral Троїцький собор	Pochaiv	1912	19 March 2025	50.00555°N 25.50874°E	Architectural	190029/2	More images	
Monastic cells Монастирські келії	Pochaiv	1771–1780	19 March 2025	50.00517°N 25.50709°E	Architectural	190029/3	More images	
Archiereus's house Архієрейський будинок	Pochaiv	1825	19 March 2025	50.00464°N 25.50851°E	Architectural	190029/4	More images	
Bell tower Дзвіниця	Pochaiv	1861	19 March 2025	50.00537°N 25.50790°E	Architectural	190029/5	More images	
Gate building Надбрамний корпус	Pochaiv	1839	19 March 2025	50.00489°N 25.50865°E	Architectural	190029/6	More images	
All Saints Church (stone) Всіхсвятська церква (мур.)	Pochaiv	1773	25 February 2026	50.00394°N 25.52643°E	Architectural	190062	More images	
Transfiguration Church (stone) Преображенська церква (мур.)	Shumsk	1637–1715	25 February 2026	50.12091°N 26.11021°E	Architectural	190065	More images	
Intercession Church (wooden) Покровська церква (дер.)	Staryi Pochaiv	1643	25 February 2026	50.02091°N 25.48041°E	Architectural	190063	More images	
Palace and park complex Палацово-парковий комплекс	Vyshnivets	1720	19 March 2025	49.89925°N 25.73880°E	Architectural, garden and park art, historic	190022	More images	
Palace Палац	Vyshnivets	1720	19 March 2025	49.89904°N 25.73886°E	Architectural, historic	190022/1	More images	
Park Парк	Vyshnivets	18th century	19 March 2025	49.89893°N 25.73683°E	Garden and park art	190022/2	More images	
Service buildings Господарські будівлі	Vyshnivets	1720	19 March 2025	49.89987°N 25.73802°E	Architectural, historic	190022/3	More images	
Main (eastern) gate and fence Головна (східна) брама та огорожа	Vyshnivets	1720	19 March 2025	49.89985°N 25.73982°E	Architectural, historic	190022/4	More images	

== Ternopil Raion ==
† Remaining on the Soviet-era register

Monuments of national significance in Ternopil Raion
Name	Location	Date constructed	Date designated	Coordinates	Type	Protection number	Photo	Ref.
St John's Church Іванівська церква	Bavoriv	1747	25 February 2026	49.44299°N 25.71416°E	Architectural	190049	More images	
Trinity Cathedral † Троїцький собор	Berezhany	17th century	24 August 1963	49.44495°N 24.93768°E	Architectural	639	More images	
City hall public house Громадський будинок Ратуша	Berezhany	1803, 1811	19 March 2025	49.44508°N 24.93907°E	Architectural	190006	More images	
Complex of the Sieniawski Castle Комплекс замку Синявських	Berezhany	16th–18th centuries	19 March 2025	49.44623°N 24.94493°E	Architectural	190007	More images	
Castle Замок	Berezhany	1534–1554	19 March 2025	49.44613°N 24.94432°E	Architectural	190007/1	More images	
Trinity Castle Tomb Church (Chapel of the Holy Trinity) Троїцький замковий костел-усипальниця (Каплиця Святої Трійці)	Berezhany	1554	19 March 2025	49.44592°N 24.94508°E	Architectural	190007/2	More images	
Bernardine Church and cells (stone) Костел бернардинів з келіями (мур.)	Berezhany	1630–1683	25 February 2026	49.44849°N 24.93611°E	Architectural	190034	More images	
Church and bell tower (stone) Костел та дзвіниця (мур.)	Berezhany	1620	25 February 2026	49.44373°N 24.93782°E	Architectural	190035	More images	
St Nicholas Church (wooden) Миколаївська церква (дер.)	Berezhany	1691	25 February 2026	49.43578°N 24.94196°E	Architectural	190036	More images	
Church (stone) Костел (мур.)	Bishche	1644–1653	25 February 2026	49.55331°N 24.89770°E	Architectural	190037	More images	
Sts Peter and Paul Church and bell tower Петропавлівська церква та дзвіниця	Butsniv	1774	25 February 2026	49.47620°N 25.57376°E	Architectural	190050	More images	
Church (stone) Костел (мур.)	Dolyna	1611–1634	25 February 2026	49.21280°N 25.72713°E	Architectural	190047	More images	
Castle (stone) Замок (мур.)	Dolyna	17th century	25 February 2026	49.21276°N 25.72631°E	Architectural	190048	More images	
St Nicholas Church and bell tower (wooden) (Note: Despite what its name suggests, St Nicholas Church in Kolodne is made of brick, not wood.) † Миколаївська церква та дзвіниця (дер.)	Kolodne	1575	6 September 1979	49.75374°N 25.70453°E	Architectural	1584	More images	
Bell tower of St Michael's Church (wooden) Дзвіниця церкви Св. Михаїла (дер.)	Kolodne	18th century	25 February 2026	49.75846°N 25.71535°E	Architectural	190052	More images	
Dormition Church and bell tower (wooden) Успенська церква та дзвіниця (дер.)	Koniukhy	1700	25 February 2026	49.56998°N 25.05917°E	Architectural	190056	More images	
Castle Замок	Mykulyntsi	16th century	19 March 2025	49.39675°N 25.60935°E	Architectural	190015	More images	
Palace Палац	Mykulyntsi	18th–19th centutries	19 March 2025	49.39723°N 25.60689°E	Architectural	190016	More images	
Church Костел	Mykulyntsi	1761–1779	25 February 2026	49.40004°N 25.60624°E	Architectural	190057	More images	
Church (stone) Церква (мур.)	Pidhaitsi	1650–1653	25 February 2026	49.27048°N 25.13471°E	Architectural	190040	More images	
Saviour-Transfiguration Church and bell tower (wooden) Спасо-Преображенська церква та дзвіниця (дер.)	Pidhaitsi	1772	25 February 2026	49.26462°N 25.13510°E	Architectural	190041	More images	
Church (stone) Костел (мур.)	Pidhaitsi	1634	25 February 2026	49.26972°N 25.14125°E	Architectural	190042	More images	
Synagogue (stone) Синагога (мур.)	Pidhaitsi	Late 16th–17th centuries	25 February 2026	49.26767°N 25.13516°E	Architectural	190043	More images	
Palace (stone) Палац (мур.)	Plotycha	1721	25 February 2026	49.61946°N 25.56038°E	Architectural	190051	More images	
Hunting palace (stone) Мисливський палац (мур.)	Rai	1760–1770	25 February 2026	49.43048°N 24.90537°E	Architectural	190038	More images	
Church and bell tower (wooden) Церква та дзвінця (дер.)	Shumliany	1711–1772	25 February 2026	49.28854°N 24.87353°E	Architectural	190059	More images	
Castle Замок	Skalat	1630	19 March 2025	49.42594°N 25.97284°E	Architectural	190012	More images	
Church (wooden) Церква (дер.)	Skoryky	1700	25 February 2026	49.59804°N 26.14139°E	Architectural	190058	More images	
Castle (ruins) Замок (руїни)	Staryi Zbarazh	14th–16th centuries	19 March 2025	49.65810°N 25.74960°E	Archaeological, architectural	190011	More images	
Castle Замок	Terebovlia	14th–17th centuries	19 March 2025	49.29930°N 25.68336°E	Architectural, historic	190013	More images	
Building complex of the Carmelite Monastery (stone) Комплекс споруд монастиря кармелітів (мур.)	Terebovlia	1635	25 February 2026	49.30028°N 25.68806°E	Architectural	190044	More images	
St Nicholas Church (stone) Миколаївська церква (мур.)	Terebovlia	Late 16th century	25 February 2026	49.29998°N 25.69058°E	Architectural	190045	More images	
Uhornytskyi Monastery (ruins) (stone) Угорницький монастир (руїни) (мур.)	Terebovlia	16th–17th centuries	25 February 2026	49.28039°N 25.69018°E	Architectural	190046	More images	
Church of the Dominican Monastery (stone) Костел монастиря домініканців (мур.)	Ternopil	1749–1779	25 February 2026	49.55306°N 25.59165°E	Architectural	190030	More images	
Old Castle (stone) Старий замок (мур.)	Ternopil	1540	25 February 2026	49.55334°N 25.58759°E	Architectural	190031	More images	
Exaltation of the Holy Cross Church (stone) Здвиженська церква (мур.)	Ternopil	16th–17th centuries	25 February 2026	49.55099°N 25.58300°E	Architectural	190032	More images	
Resurrection Church (stone) Воскресенська церква (мур.)	Ternopil	1602–1608	25 February 2026	49.55053°N 25.59260°E	Architectural	190033	More images	
Church (wooden) Церква (дер.)	Urman	1688	25 February 2026	49.57108°N 24.95324°E	Architectural	190039	More images	
Multilayered dwelling "Hlybochok I" Стоянка багатошарова "Глибочок I"	Velykyi Hlybochok	1.5 million – 10,000 BCE, 9th–7th millennia BCE	14 September 2009	49.64016°N 25.52346°E	Archaeological	190005-Н		
Intercession Church and bell tower (stone) Покровська церква та дзвіниця (мур.)	Zaliztsi	1740	25 February 2026	49.80129°N 25.38760°E	Architectural	190053	More images	
Castle (stone) Замок (мур.)	Zaliztsi	1516	25 February 2026	49.79575°N 25.38262°E	Architectural	190054	More images	
Church (ruins) (stone) Костел (руїни) (мур.)	Zaliztsi	15th–17th centuries	25 February 2026	49.79530°N 25.38029°E	Architectural	190055	More images	
Church of the Transfiguration of Our Lord Церква Преображення Господнього	Zaluzhzhia	1600	19 March 2025	49.66187°N 25.75306°E	Architectural	190010	More images	
Castle Замок	Zbarazh	17th–20th centuries	19 March 2025	49.66331°N 25.78539°E	Architectural, historic	190008	More images	
Palace Палац	Zbarazh	17th century	19 March 2025	49.66341°N 25.78537°E	Architectural, historic	190008/1	More images	
Casemates Каземати	Zbarazh	17th century	19 March 2025	49.66376°N 25.78533°E	Architectural, historic	190008/2	More images	
Entrance tower with footbridge В'їзна вежа з перехідним мостом	Zbarazh	17th century	19 March 2025	49.66375°N 25.78476°E	Architectural, historic	190008/3	More images	
Defensive walls (escarpments) and bastions, external defensive walls and bastions Оборонні мури (ескарпи) та бастіони, зовнішні оборонні мури та бастіони	Zbarazh	17th century	19 March 2025	49.66412°N 25.78514°E	Architectural, historic	190008/4	More images	
Castle well Замкова криниця	Zbarazh	17th century	19 March 2025	49.66368°N 25.78513°E	Architectural, historic	190008/5	More images	
Castle park Призамковий парк	Zbarazh	17th–20th centuries	19 March 2025	49.66362°N 25.78388°E	Garden and park art	190008/6	More images	
Building complex of Bernardine Monastery Комплекс споруд монастиря Бернардинів	Zbarazh	1627	19 March 2025	49.66333°N 25.77761°E	Architectural, historic	190009	More images	
Church of St Athony (of Padua) Костел св. Антонія (Падуанського)	Zbarazh	1627	19 March 2025	49.66339°N 25.77786°E	Architectural, historic	190009/1	More images	
Cells of the monastery Келії монастиря	Zbarazh	1627	19 March 2025	49.66381°N 25.77793°E	Architectural, historic	190009/2	More images	
Bell tower Дзвіниця	Zbarazh	1627	19 March 2025	49.66389°N 25.77743°E	Architectural, historic	190009/3	More images	
Defensive walls Оборонні мури	Zbarazh	1627	19 March 2025	49.66389°N 25.77716°E	Architectural, historic	190009/4	More images	

== See also ==
- List of historic reserves in Ukraine
- Ukrainian architecture
