= Husiatyn Castle =

Castle in Husiatyn, Ternopil Oblast, Ukraine

- Гусятинський замок
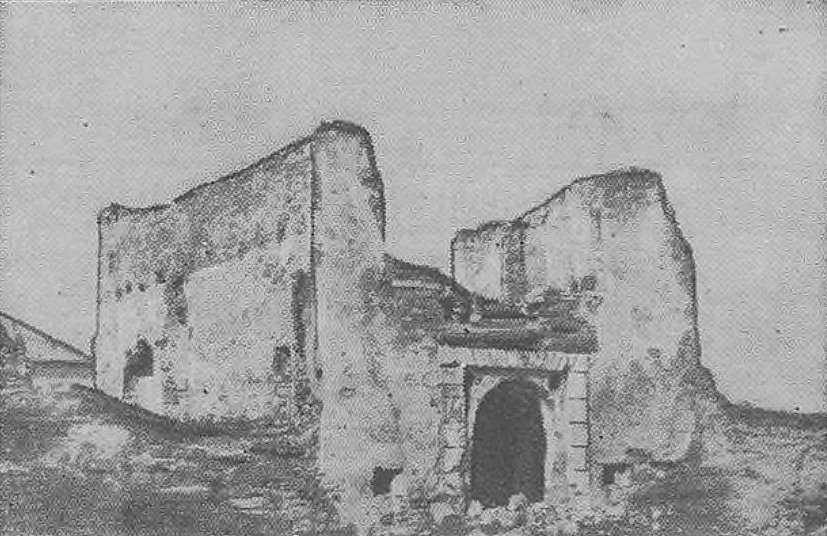
- Ruins of the castle
- Interactive map of the Husiatyn Castle area

General information
- Status: Architectural monument of local importance
- Location: Husiatyn, Ternopil Raion, Ternopil Oblast, Ukraine
- Coordinates: 49°04′19.2″N 26°12′18.7″E

The Husiatyn Castle (Ukrainian: Гусятинський замок, romanized: Husiatyns'kyi zamok) is located in Husiatyn, Ternopil Oblast, Ukraine. Castle built in 1630 on the steep bank of the Zbrucz River, north of the city center, and an architectural monument of local importance.

== History ==
The castle was built as a borderland fortalition on the initiative of Marcin Kalinowski, Crown Field Hetman. When the hetman was taken prisoner by the Tatars in 1648, the fortress was captured and destroyed by Cossacks. Quickly rebuilt, it still managed to defend itself against the Cossacks and Tatars in 1653 and against the Muscovite army in 1655. Despite the victory, the fortress was severely damaged. The castle was besieged and captured during the Polish-Turkish War in the 1670s-80s. In 1683, after the defeat of the Turks at Vienna, it was recaptured by Polish troops under the command of Andrzej Potocki, castellan of Kraków. However, the Turks, while retreating, destroyed the defensive walls of the city and partially also the castle. It survived in good condition until the end of the First Republic. The castle, which existed in a semi-ruined state, was sold by Agenor Romuald Goluchowski in the first half of the 19th century to a local rabbi, who dismantled the structure and built a new palace and synagogue for himself, which were completely destroyed in 1914–1918, during World War I. Before 1939, there was an entrance gate in the ruins of the castle in Husiatyn.

It has reached the present day as a complete ruin, of which little remains. Traces of the old walls lean with their ends against the course of the river.

== Owners and guests ==
Until 1729 the building belonged to the Kalinowski family, then to the Potocki family, and from 1819 the estate was purchased by the Zabielski family, whose ownership it remained until the mid-19th century, when it became the seat of a Jewish tzaddik. In its history, the castle hosted Polish kings Władysław IV Vasa and John II Casimir Vasa.
