= Great Synagogue (Husiatyn) =

Former synagogue in Husiatyn, Ukraine

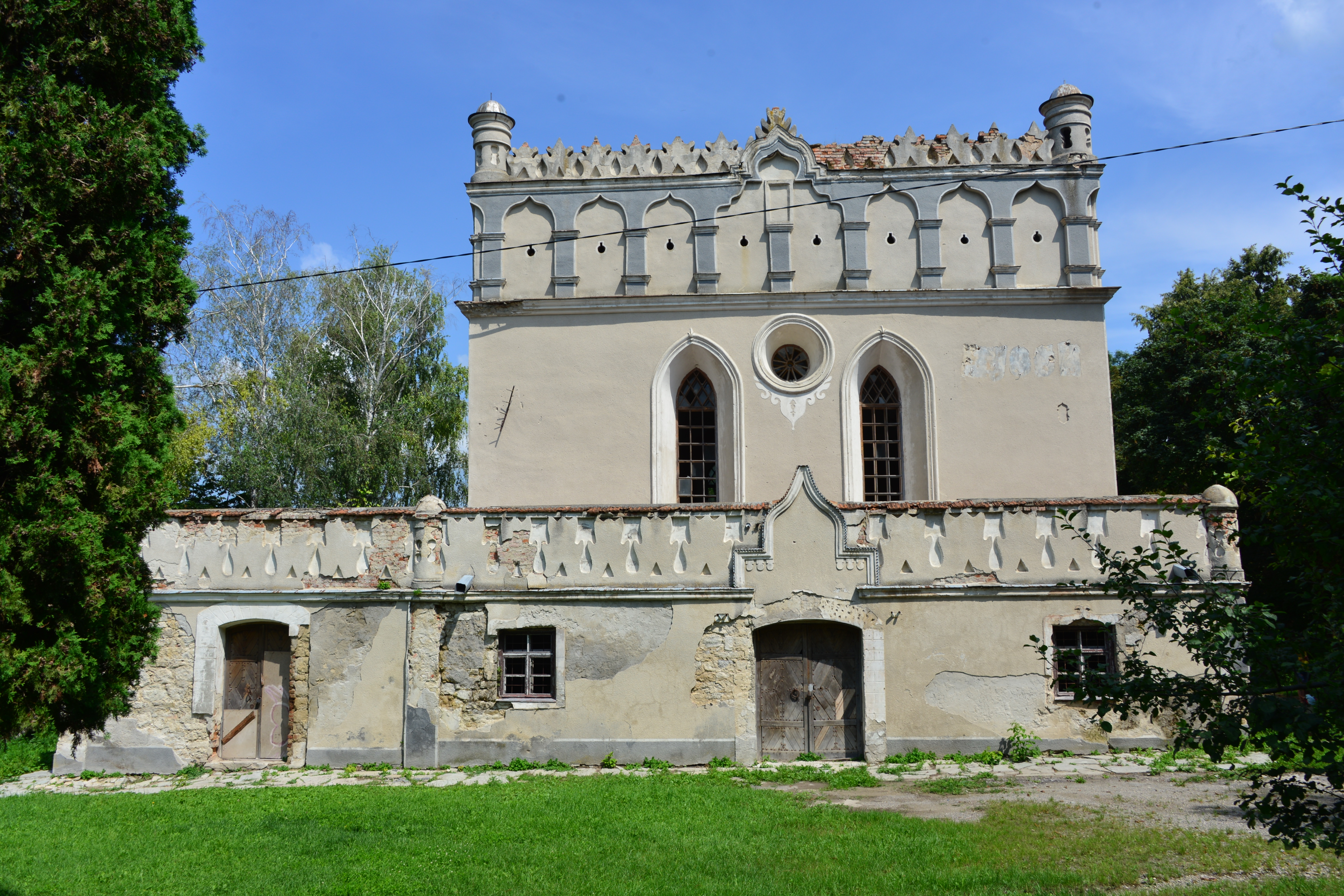
- The former synagogue, in 2018

- Location of the former synagogue in Ukraine

Religion
- Affiliation: Orthodox Judaism (former)
- Rite: Nusach Ashkenaz (from 1654); Hasidic Judaism (from late 19th-century)
- Ecclesiastical or organisational status: Synagogue (1654–1941); Jewish museum (1972–1990s)
- Status: Abandoned

Location
- Location: Heroiv Maidanu Street, Husiatyn, Ternopil Oblast 48200
- Country: Ukraine
- Coordinates: 49°04′24″N 26°12′31″E

Architecture
- Type: Synagogue architecture
- Style: Renaissance (1654); Moorish and Gothic revivals (1742)
- Completed: 1654; 1742 (rebuild)

Immovable Monument of National Significance of Ukraine
- Official name: Синагога (Synagogue)
- Type: Architecture
- Reference no.: 190100

The Great Synagogue (Festungs-Schule) is a former Orthodox Jewish synagogue, located on Heroiv Maidanu Street, in Husiatyn, Ternopil Oblast, Ukraine. The congregation worshipped initially in the Ashkenazi rite; however, by the late 19th-century, the congregation worshipped according to Hassidic practices.

Described as "one of the loveliest and most splendid in Galicia", and as "exquisite", the former synagogue building is listed as an architectural monument of national significance of Ukraine.

== History ==
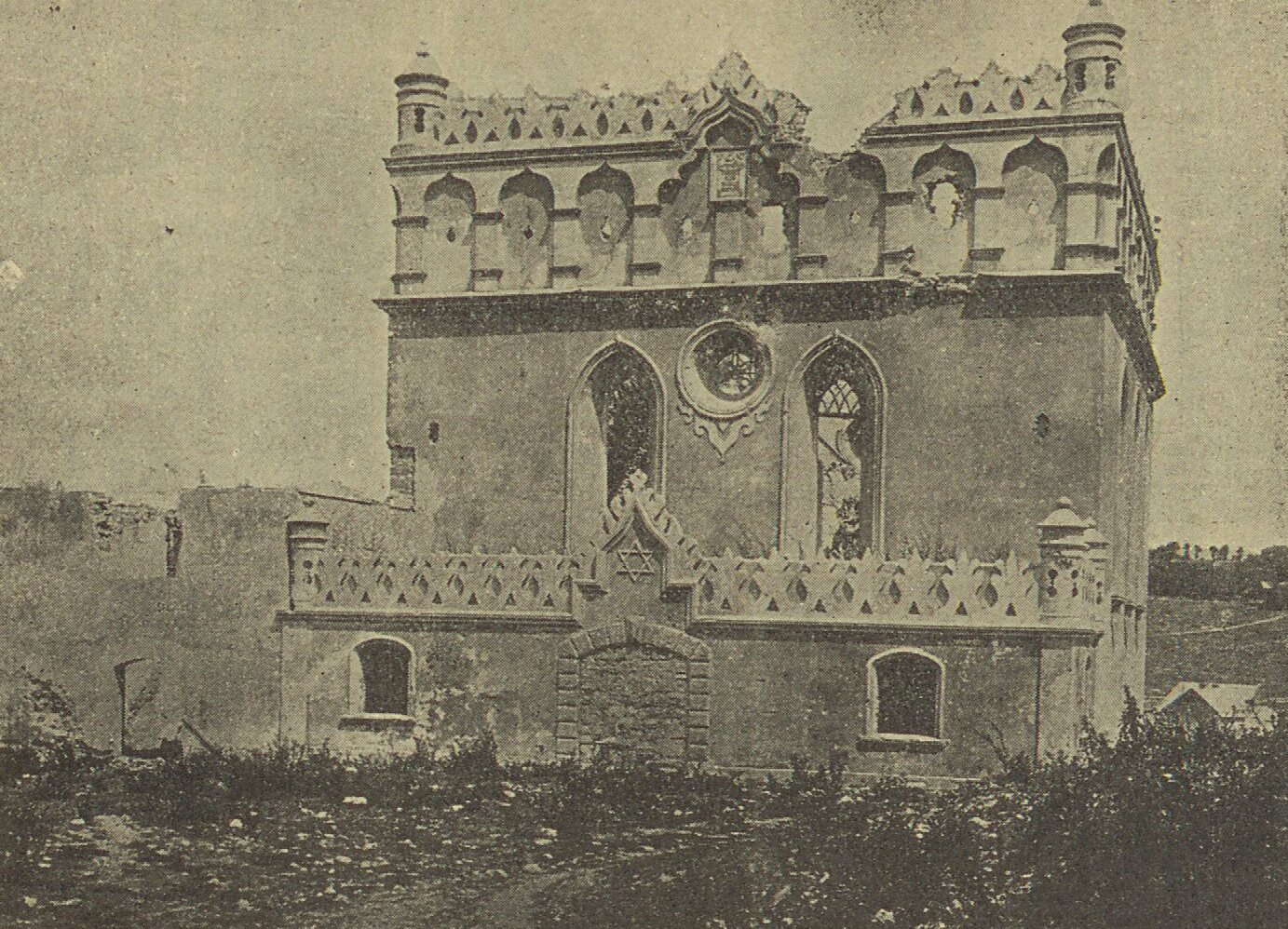
View of the synagogue before 1936

Built in the Polish–Lithuanian Commonwealth in 1654, (Note: The synagogue is often erroneously described as a 16th-century synagogue.) the synagogue is a rare example of Renaissance fortress architecture. After a fire in 1742, the synagogue was rebuilt and almost lost all its distinctive defensive features. The rebuild incorporated Moorish Revival and Gothic Revival decorative elements in the façade and interior.

Damaged during and after World War II the building ceased to operate as a synagogue following invasion by German Nazis in 1941. In 1972 the standing ruin was renovated and turned into a local history museum. In 2014, the building, no longer a museum, was listed by government authorities as available for lease. Today, the roof has collapsed and the building stands vacant.

== See also ==
- Center for Jewish History
- History of the Jews in Ukraine
- List of synagogues in Ukraine
