= Husiatyn =

Rural locality in Ternopil Oblast, Ukraine

Husiatyn Гусятин Husiatyn (in Polish) הוסיאַטין (in Yiddish) Gusiatyn
- Rural settlement
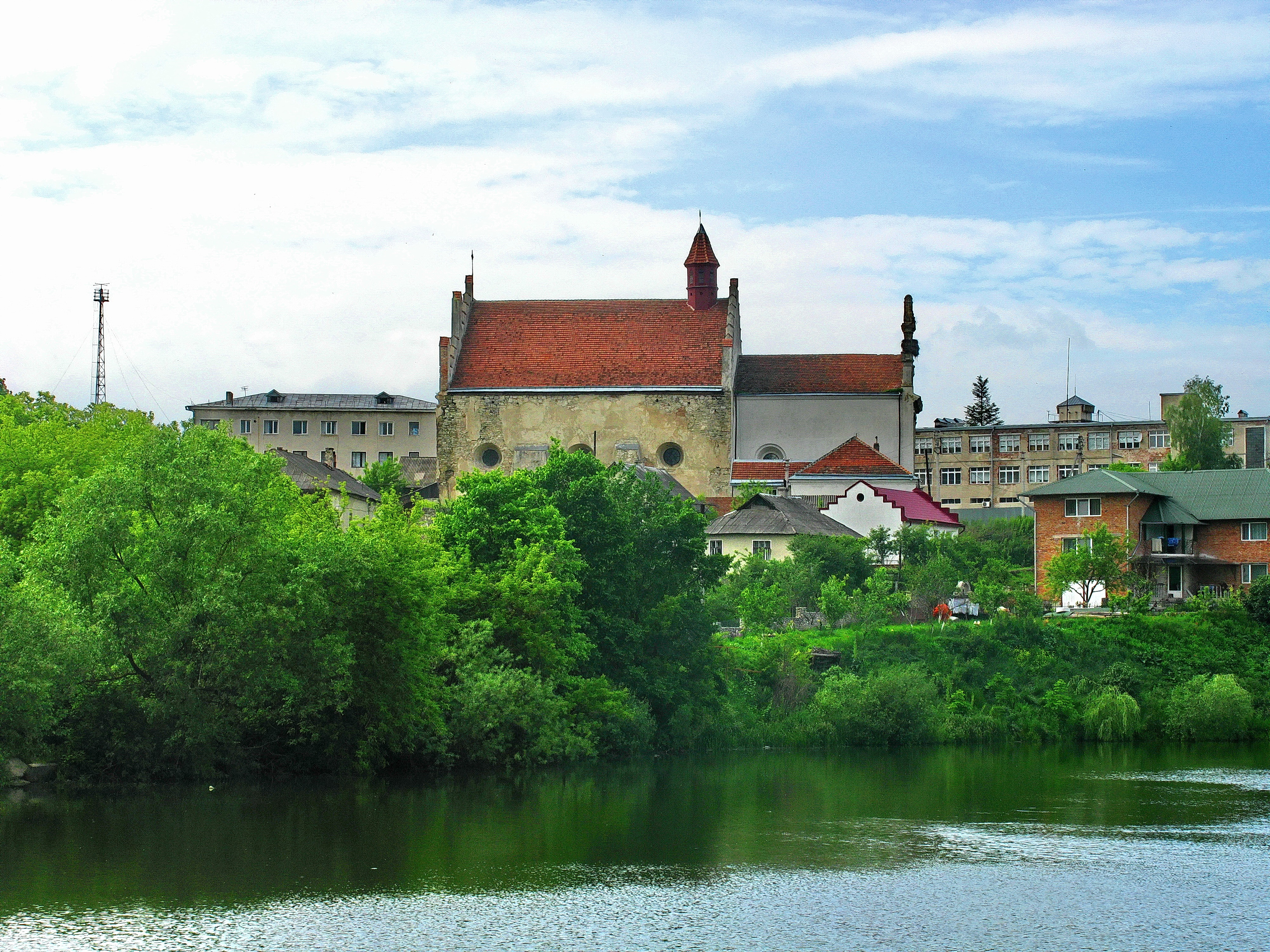
- View of the town

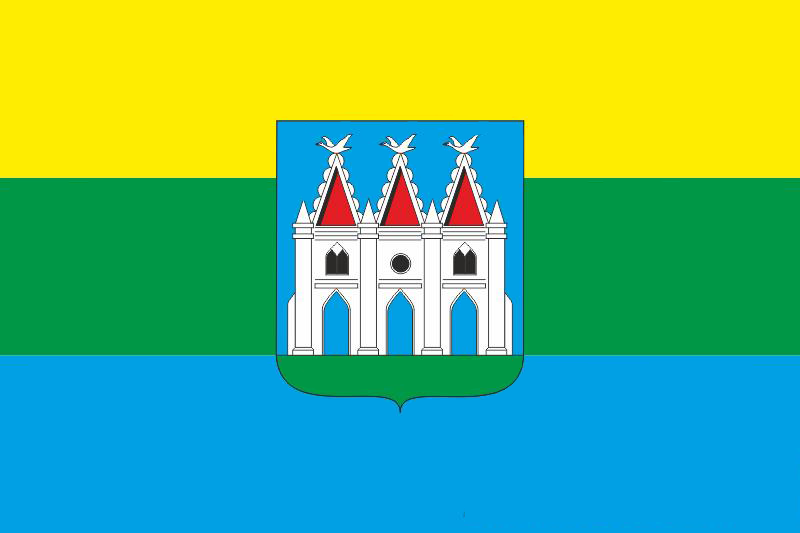
- Flag Coat of arms

- Location of Husiatyn in Ukraine Husiatyn (Ukraine)
- Coordinates: 49°04′14″N 26°11′37″E
- Country: Ukraine
- Oblast: Ternopil Oblast
- Raion: Chortkiv Raion
- Hromada: Husiatyn settlement hromada
- Foundation: 1431
- Magdeburg rights: 1559
- Urban-type settlement Status: 1961

Government
  - Mayor: Mykhailo Levytsky

Area
  - Total: 35 km^{2} (14 sq mi)
- Elevation: 272 m (892 ft)

Population (2022)
  - Total: 7,034
  - Density: 200/km^{2} (520/sq mi)
- Time zone: UTC+2 (EET)
  - Summer (DST): UTC+3 (EEST)
- Postal code: 48205
- Area code: +380 3557
- KOATUU Code: 6121655100

Husiatyn (Note: Alternate spellings include Gusyatin, Husyatin, and Hsiatyn) (Ukrainian: Гусятин, Ukrainian pronunciation: [ɦʊˈsʲɑtɪn]; Yiddish: הוסיאַטין, romanized: Husyatin) is a rural settlement in Chortkiv Raion, Ternopil Oblast, western Ukraine. It hosts the administration of Husiatyn settlement hromada, one of the hromadas of Ukraine. Husiatyn is located on the west bank of the Zbruch River, which once formed the old boundary between Austria-Hungary and the Russian Empire in the 19th century, and the boundary between Poland and the Soviet Union during the 1920s and 1930s. The population is 7,032 (2022 estimate).

== History ==
Historical population
| Year | Pop. | ±% |
|---|---|---|
| 1910 | 6,000 | — |
| 1931 | 3,000 | −50.0% |
| 2022 | 7,032 | +134.4% |

Husiatyn was first recorded in 1559, when it was part of the Polish–Lithuanian Commonwealth and the year it was granted self-government under the Magdeburg Law. At this time it was located in the province of Podolia. It came under Austrian rule in 1772 with other parts of Southern Podolia (the region between the Zbruch and the Seret rivers) and was attached to the Austrian crownland of Galicia and Lodomeria. Emperor Joseph II toured this area immediately after its annexation to Austria and was very impressed by the fertility of the soil and its future prospects.

The 19th century rural population of Husiatyn County was predominantly Ukrainian and the town predominantly Jewish. There was also a small Polish landowning stratum. In the late 19th century and the beginning of the 20th century, Southern Podolia, including Husiatyn County, witnessed large-scale out-migration of its peasant population to western Canada. Husiatyn remained a county centre under Austrian rule until the collapse of Austria-Hungary and the declaration of the Western Ukrainian People's Republic in 1918. Between April and July 1919 Husiatyn was the site of battles between Ukrainian, Soviet and Polish troops. In 1919, the Ukrainian Galician Army fought the Bolsheviks there but was driven out by the Poles, who absorbed the area into the Second Polish Republic.

On 17 September 1939 Husiatyn was occupied by invading Soviet troops, with a small Polish unit stationed in the town engaging in resistance and eliminating several Red Army soldiers from the 153rd Cavalry Regiment. In the aftermath, Husiatyn was annexed to the Ukrainian Soviet Socialist Republic. Husiatyn was occupied by Nazi troops on July 6, 1941. As soon as they arrived, approximately 200 Jews were sent to the labor camps or were killed immediately by the Germans and the Ukrainian police. In March 1942, the remaining Jews were transported to concentration camps in Kopychyntsi, Probizhna and Belzec.

Until 18 July 2020, Husiatyn served as the administrative center of Husiatyn Raion. The raion was abolished in July 2020 as part of the administrative reform of Ukraine, which reduced the number of raions of Ternopil Oblast to three. The area of Husiatyn Raion was merged into Chortkiv Raion.

Until 26 January 2024, Husiatyn was designated urban-type settlement. On this day, a new law entered into force which abolished this status, and Husiatyn became a rural settlement.

=== Husiatyn and Hasidism ===
Husiatyn, which was home to a large Jewish population prior to the Holocaust, was once the base for a significant Hasidic group of the Husiatyner dynasty and their Rebbes. Four generations of the dynasty lived in Husiatyn: Shraga Feivish Friedman, (1835–1894) 1st Rebbe of Husiatyn; Yisroel Friedman, (1858–1949) 2nd Rebbe of Husiatyn, Yaakov Friedman, (1878–1957) 3rd Rebbe of Husiatyn, and Yitzchok Friedman, (1900–1968) 4th and last Rebbe of Husiatyn. The Husiatyn Synagogue, a rare example of a Fortress synagogue, was restored as a museum.

== Monuments ==
Architectural monuments in the town of Husiatyn include the ruins of a 17th-century castle, a 16th-century church, a 17th-century town hall, a Renaissance-style synagogue, and a 16th-century Bernardine monastery and church.

A Neolithic grave, complete with a coffin, was discovered some time before 1928 in the village of Chornokintsi Velyki (Czarnokońce Wielkie in Polish).

== Social sphere ==
There are educational, cultural and social institutions: Secondary schools of 1-3 grades, Husiatyn College of TSTU, music school, House of Culture, Center for Children and Youth Creativity, Taras Shevchenko Cinema, library, preschool, printing house, editorial office of the district newspaper "Visnyk Nadzbruchchia", central district hospital, clinic, water resort, sanatoriums "Zbruch" and "Medobory", local history museum (opened in 1979).

== Public organizations ==
Branch of the "Prosvita" society: founded in 1898, liquidated by the Soviet authorities in 1939, resumed its work in 1990 (headed by Vasyl Horbovaty).

The branch of the "Union of Ukrainian Women" legally operated until 1939, resumed its work in 1994 (headed by L. Budniak).

== Gallery ==
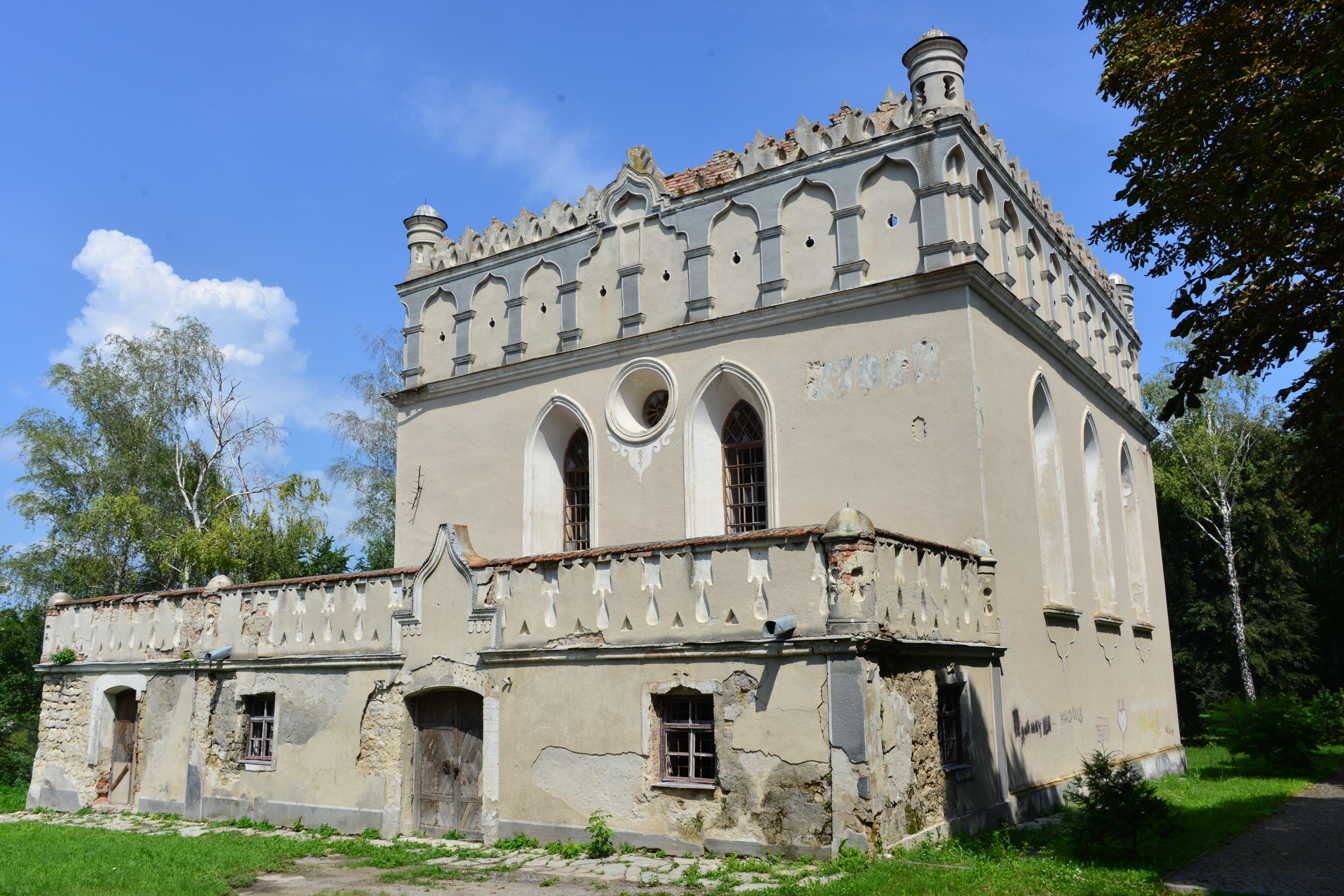
Synagogue in Husiatyn

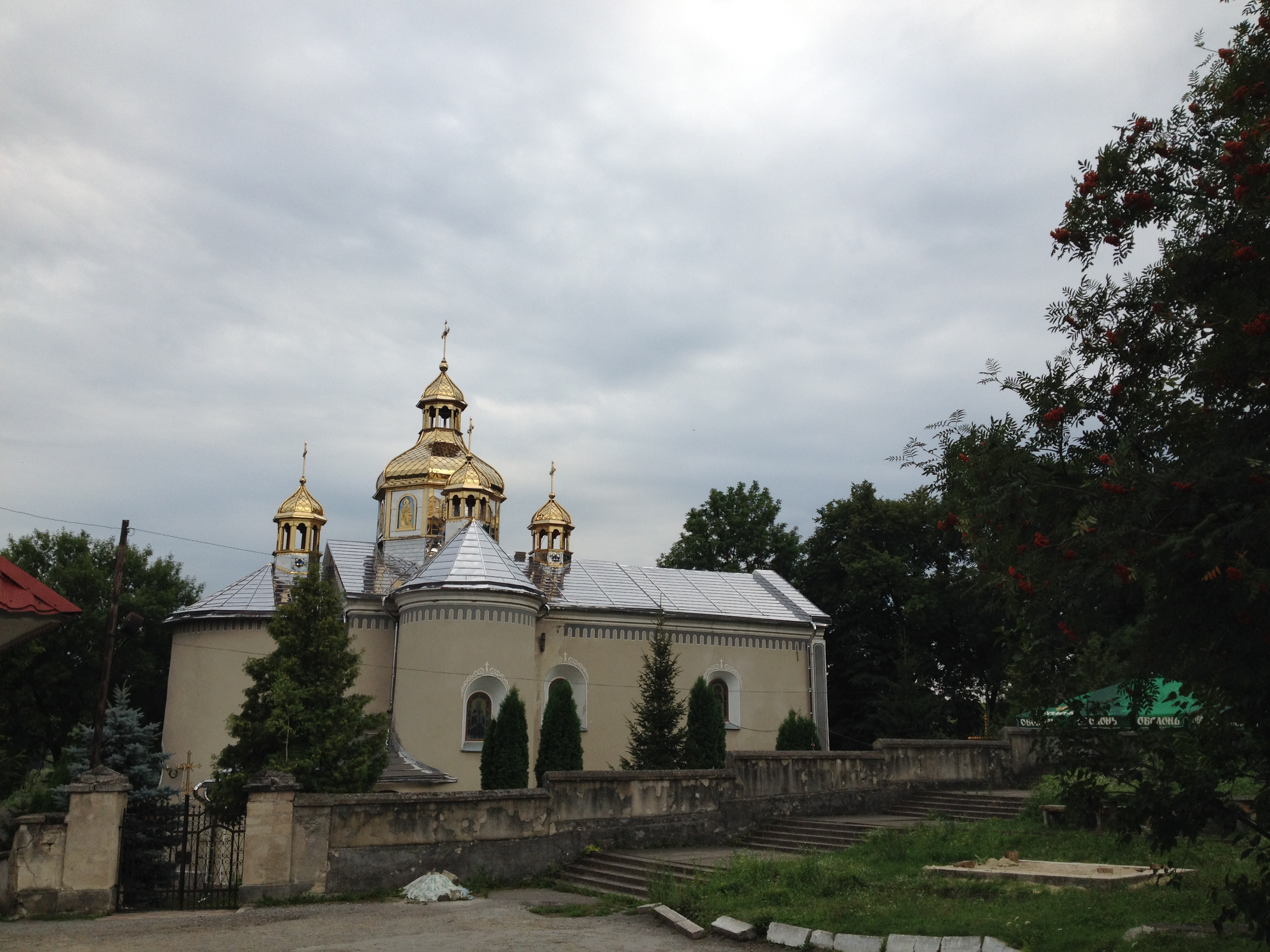
Saint Onuphrius Church

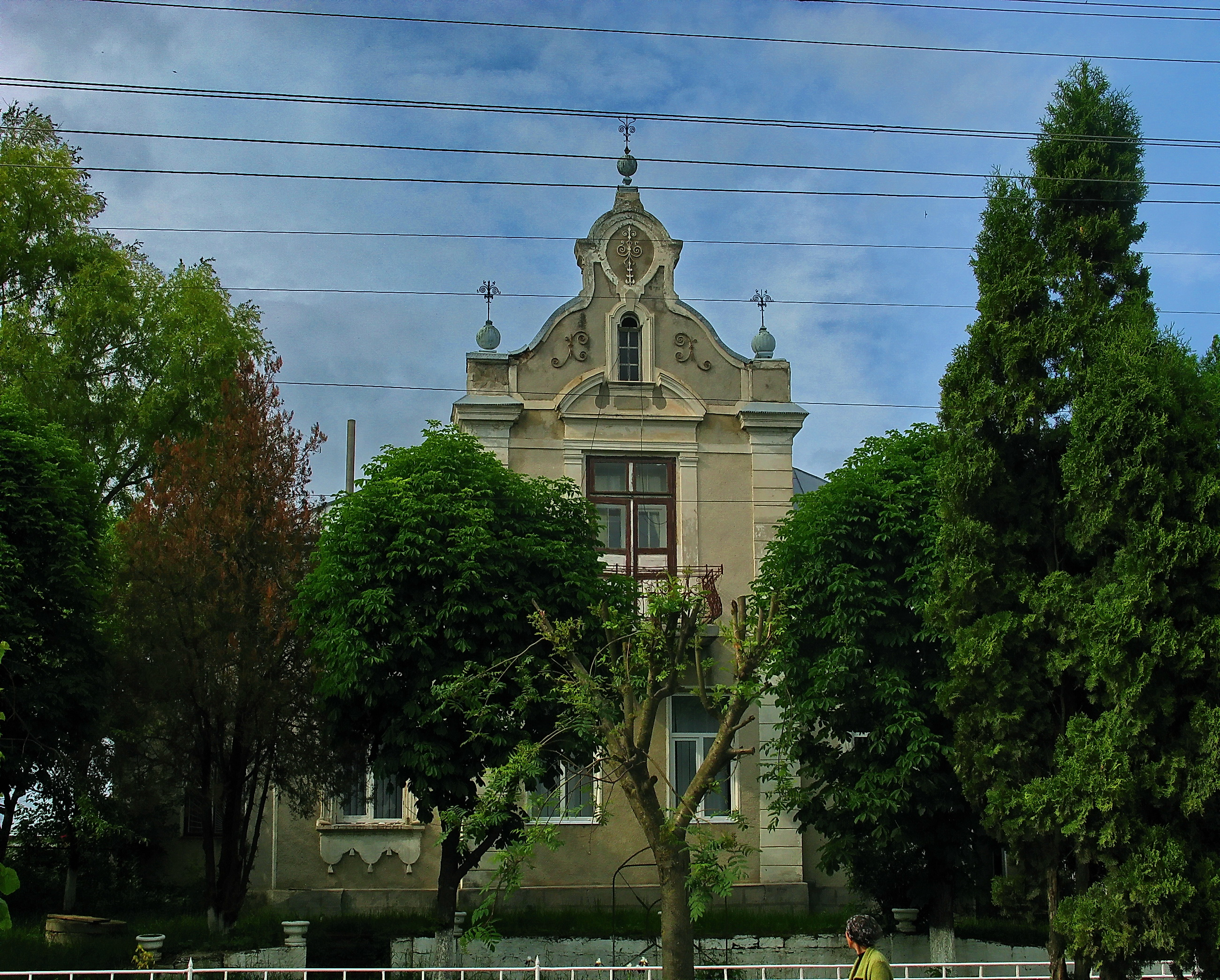
Residential building

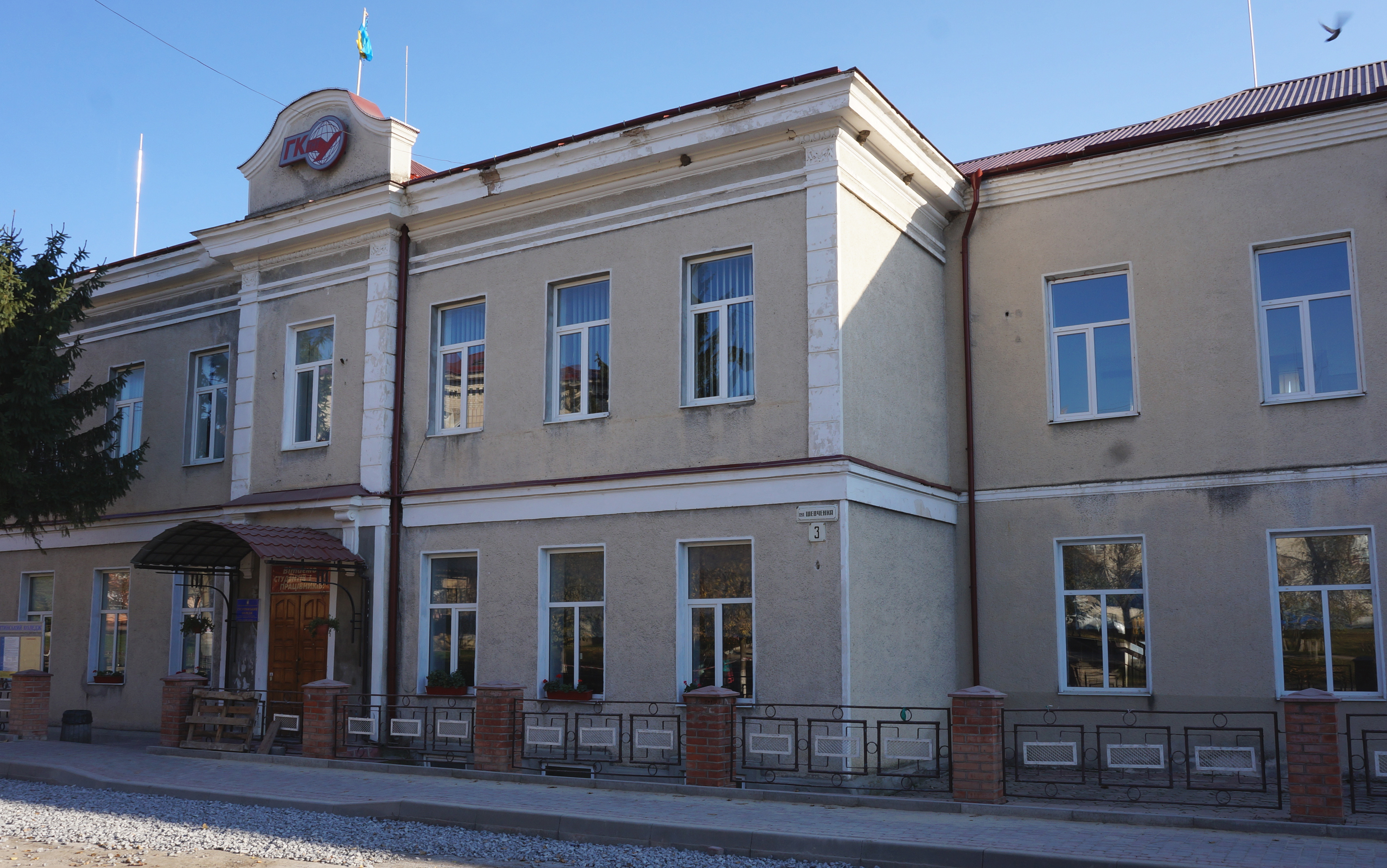
Ukrainian People's House

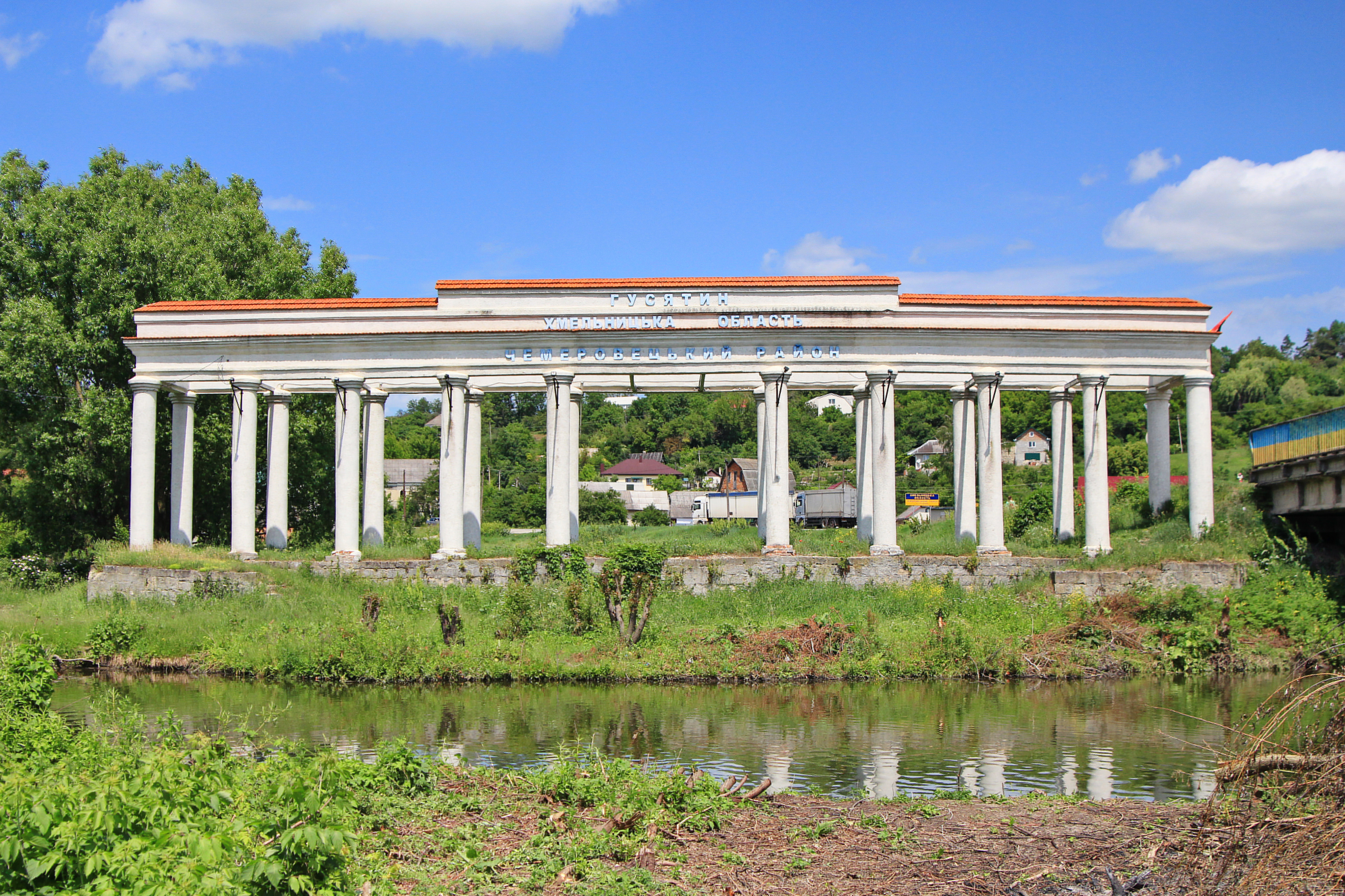
Colonnade in Husiatyn

== Notable people ==
- Severyn Nalyvaiko - 16th century Ukrainian Cossack leader
- Mordechai Shraga Feivish Friedman (1835-1894) - founder of Husiatyn (Hasidic dynasty)

== See also ==
- Saint Onuphrius Church, Husiatyn

== Sources ==
- Paulus Adelsgruber, L. Cohen, B. Kuzmany, Getrennt und Doch Verbunden: Grenzstädte Zwischen Osterreich und Russland 1772 - 1918 (Böhlau, Vienna/Cologne/Weimar 2011).
- Stella Hryniuk, Peasants With Promise: Ukrainians in Southeastern Galicia (Edmonton, 1991). On the endpapers of this book, there is a map showing all of the villages of the five counties of Southern Podolia, including Husiatyn County.
- Przewodnik po Województwie Tarnopolskiem z mapą [Guide to the Ternopil Region with a Map] (Ternopil, 1928; reprinted circa, 1990). Contains much historical material.
