= Saint Onuphrius Church, Husiatyn =

Church in Husiatyn, Ukraine

Saint Onuphrius Church
- Церква Святого Онуфрія
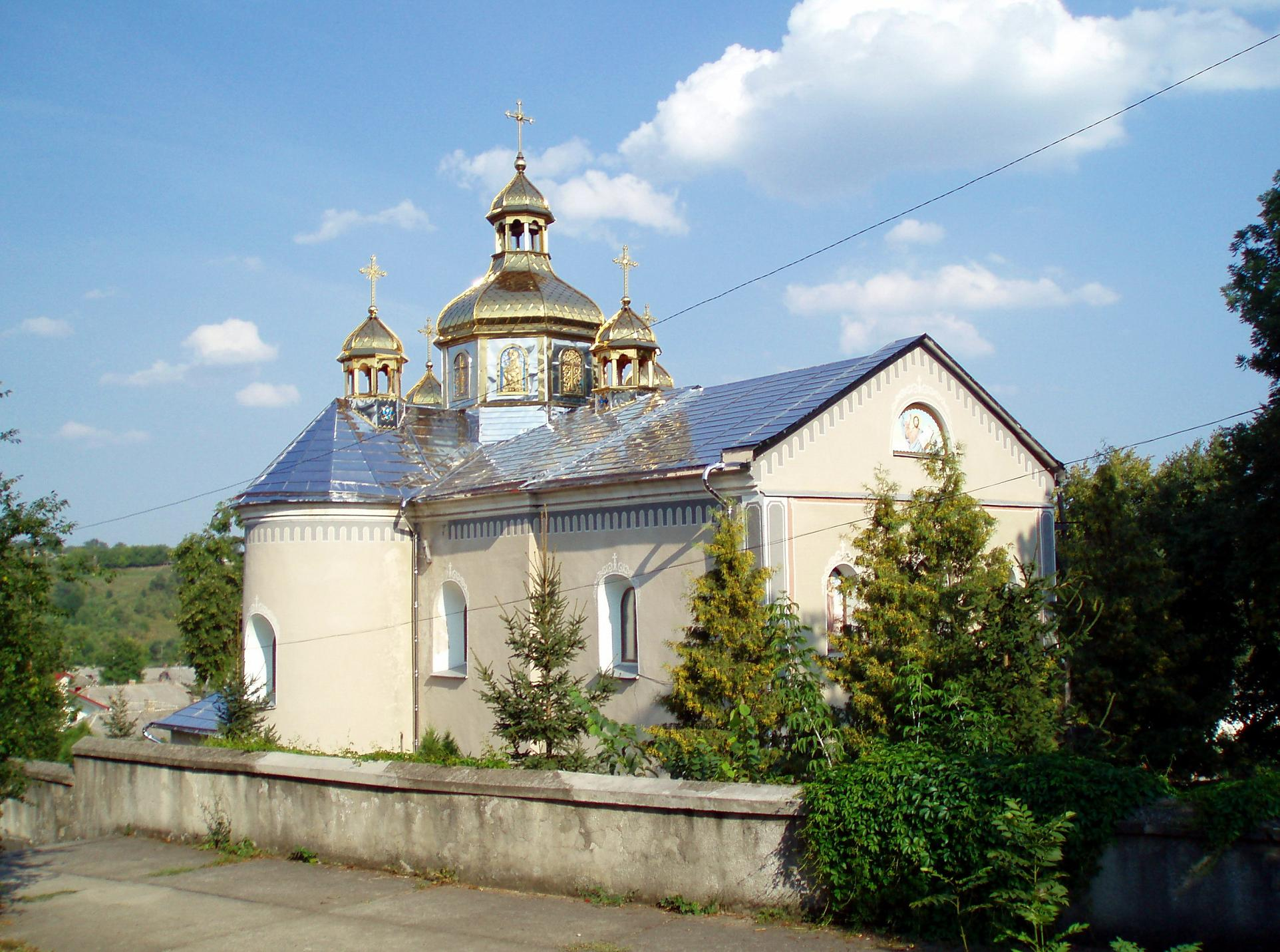

- Location within Ternopil Oblast

Location
- Location: Husiatyn
- Coordinates: 49°04′17.42″N 26°12′31.75″E

Immovable Monument of National Significance of Ukraine
- Official name: Онуфріївська церква (мур.) (St Onuphrius Church (stone))
- Type: Architecture
- Reference no.: 190099

Saint Onuphrius Church (Ukrainian: Церква Святого Онуфрія) is a historic Greek Catholic parish church in Husiatyn, Ternopil Oblast. It is an architectural monument of national significance.

== History ==
The temple was built as an Orthodox church in the last decade of the 16th century or at the beginning of the 17th century. Originally, it was a defensive church with a two-story tower, but the upper level of the tower, with its distinct defensive elements, has not been preserved. During the Turkish occupation in 1672–1699, it served as a mosque.

On 14 July 1893, the church burned down during a fire in Husiatyn.

The nave of the building is rectangular, with apses adjoining it, which in turn are adjoined by additional rooms. The church has almost no external decoration, its windows, without frames, are located halfway up the walls. The nave is covered with a barrel vault. All components of the building are connected inside by arcaded passages. Above the nave, there is a dome with a bell tower located on an octagonal drum. The architecture of the church bears clear features of Eastern Christian sacred architecture of Volhynia and Moldova.

In 2015, four domes were built on the church, as well as a portico with Ionic columns at the front.

== See also ==
- Saint Nicholas Church, Buchach
