= Bernardine Monastery, Husiatyn =

Church building in Husiatyn, Ukraine

Bernardine Monastery
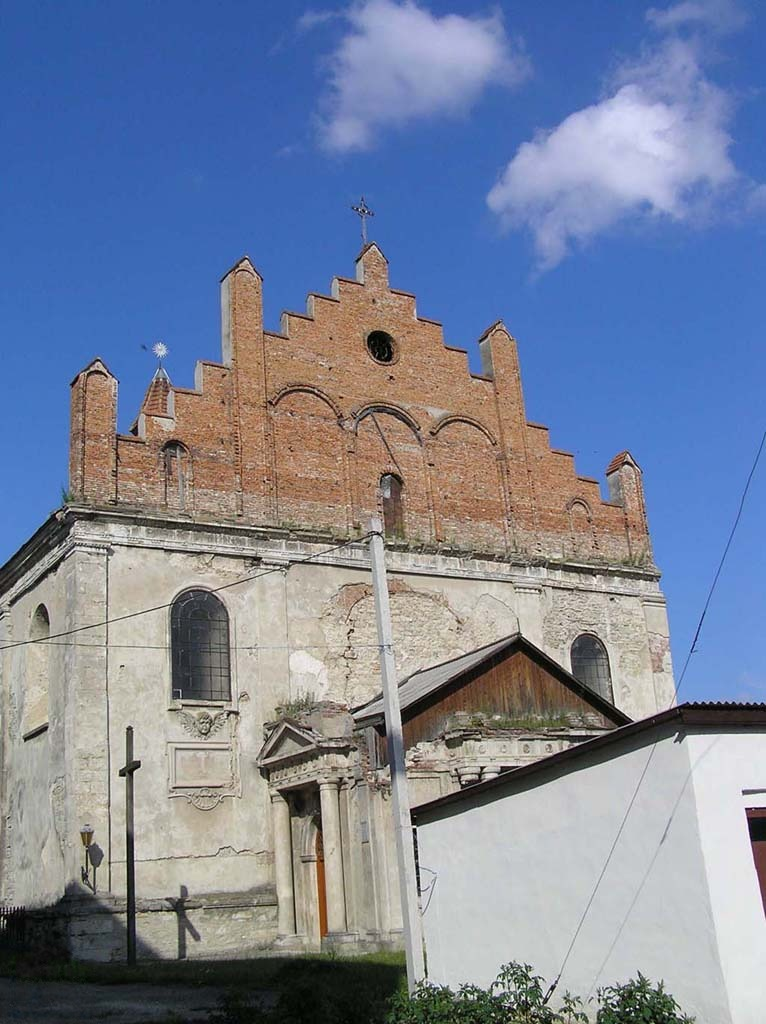
- Monastery church
- Interactive map of Bernardine Monastery

Immovable Monument of National Significance of Ukraine
- Official name: Костел бернардинів з келіями (Bernardine Church with cells)
- Type: Architecture
- Reference no.: 190101

The Bernardine Monastery (Ukrainian: Костел святого Антонія та монастир бернардинців) is a Roman Catholic monastery complex in Husiatyn, in the Ternopil Oblast in western Ukraine. It is an architectural monument of national significance.

== History ==
The monastery was founded by Walenty Aleksander Kalinowski, who donated funds for its construction in 1610. However, work on the monastery complex continued for another fifteen years and was only completed after the founder's death. In the 17th century, the monastery buildings were destroyed during Turkish and Tatar invasions and Cossack uprisings. As a result, in the second half of the century, the church and monastery were completely ruined and uninhabitable, so the Bernardines left Husiatyn in 1660. After the monks returned in 1690, Adam Mikołaj Sieniawski financed the reconstruction of the monastery complex, which lasted until 1723.

After the partitions of Poland, Husiatyn found itself under Austrian rule. In 1786, by decree of Emperor Joseph II, the monastery was dissolved. The church, which had belonged to the Bernardines, was converted into a parish church, while the monastery became a presbytery and the seat of the municipal office. Between 1913 and 1933, the parish priest was Władysław Matus, a social and political activist and member of the Sejm during its first term. In 1938, the Bernardines regained control of the monastery in Husiatyn, but after only six years they had to leave the town, together with all Polish residents. The church, which had been taken away from the Catholics, was used to house a factory and then a chemical warehouse. In 1975, the devastated buildings underwent partial renovation. However, it was not until 1990 that it was possible to restore the buildings to their original purpose, and in that year the Bernardine Order regained the destroyed buildings.

== Icon of St. Anthony of Padua ==
From the 18th century, the altar of the side aisle of the church featured a painting of St. Anthony of Padua, known as "Husiatyński". It was widely venerated, as evidenced by numerous votive offerings and a silver dress on the image of the saint. In 1945, the painting was taken by the Bernardine fathers to the monastery in Alwernia, and in 1983 to the church of St. Jude Thaddeus in Oborniki Śląskie, where many Poles expatriated from Husiatyn settled after World War II. Currently, there is a copy of the painting in the church in Husiatyn, funded by the residents of Oborniki Śląskie.

== Architecture ==
The monastery in Husiatyn was built in the Baroque style. The main monastery church, dedicated to the Nativity of the Blessed Virgin Mary, is a three-nave temple. Originally, the three naves were covered with cross vaults, which collapsed as a result of damage in the 20th century and were replaced with new ones in 1975. The main entrance to the church has the form of an Ionic portico, and the door is decorated with a pointed arch frame. All the furnishings of the temple were destroyed after 1945, with only a few decorative elements being saved by parishioners who were being deported.
