= Zolotyi Potik castle =

- Zolotyi Potik, Chortkiv Raion, Ternopil Oblast
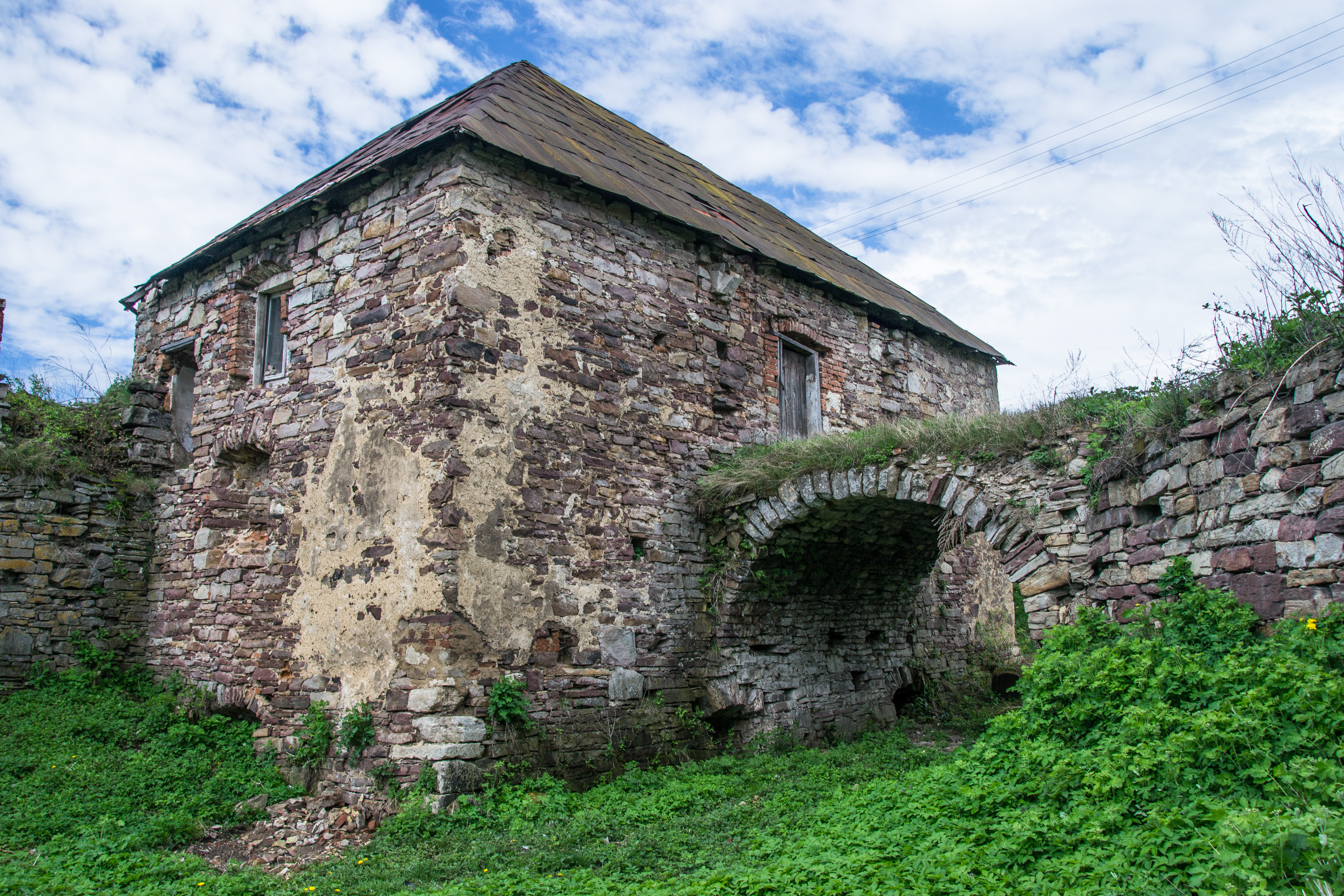

Site information
- Type: Late Renaissance
- Controlled by: Ukraine State
- Condition: partial ruination, western tower lost

Location
- Coordinates: 48°54′16″N 25°20′25″E

Site history
- Built: 1568-1631
- Materials: sandstone

Immovable Monument of National Significance of Ukraine
- Official name: Замок (Castle)
- Type: Architecture
- Reference no.: 190017

The Zolotyi Potik castle (Ukrainian: Золотопотіцький замок, romanized: Zolotopotits'kyi zamok, Polish: Zamek w Potoku Złotym) is an architectural landmark of Polish and Ukrainian national significance in Ternopil Oblast, Western Ukraine built under the Polish rule between the 16th and 17th centuries near the rural settlement of Zolotyi Potik (or Złoty Potok in Polish).

== History ==
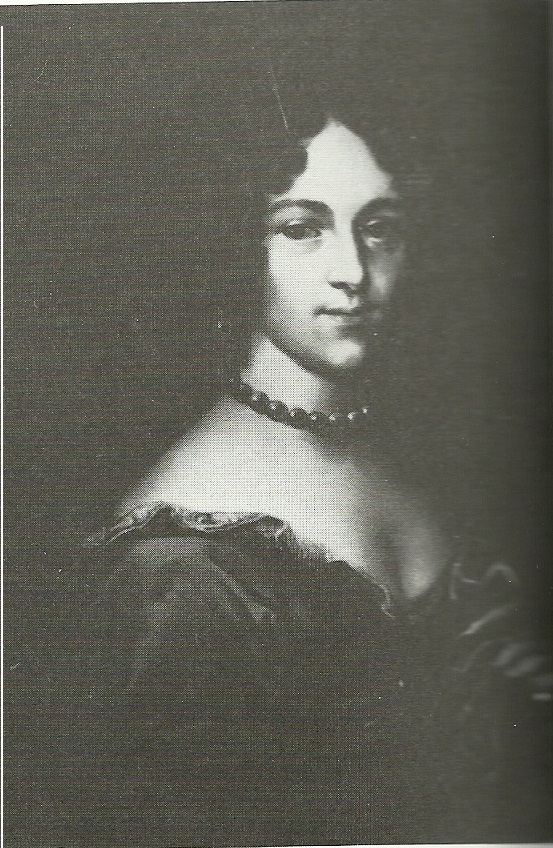
Maria Amalia Mohylanka, Zolotyi Potik Castle founder

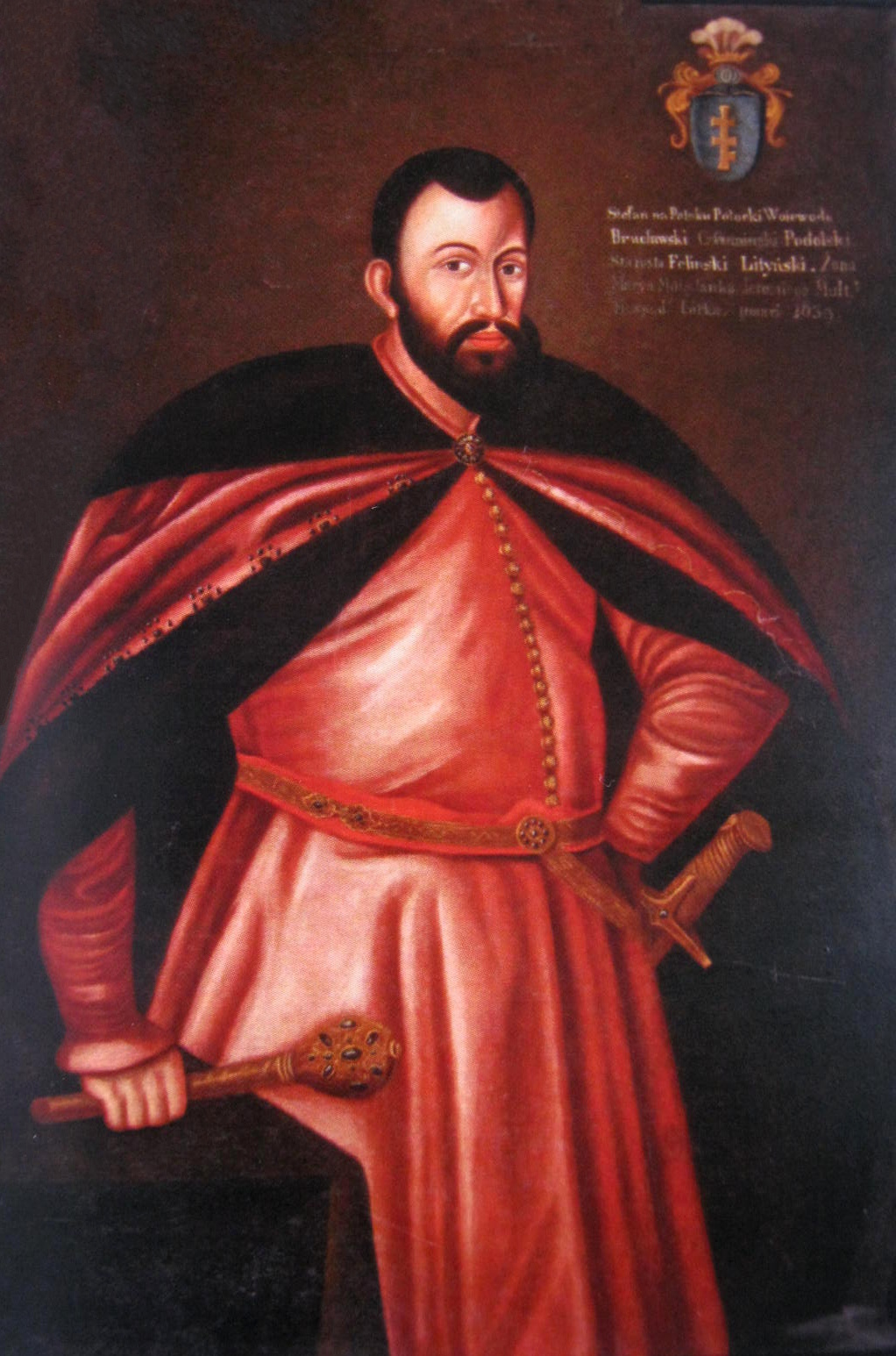
Castle founder, Potocki Stefan

The Voivode of Bracław and a wealthy Polish nobleman Stefan Potocki and his spouse, Maria Amalia Mohylanka, funded the castle construction at the turn of 16th to 17th centuries to the order of the Polish King Sigismund III Vasa. At the end of 18th century it was a residence of Jan Potocki’s family, who was the founders' son and its owner. The castle had been serving as his headquarter on the verge of Turk-Tatar inroad and following its destruction on September 1676.

In 1672 Turkish-Tatar armed forces under the command of sultan Mohamed IV captured the castle in the course of two days combat. Embattled troops gave up their positions.

On September 4 or 5th of 1676 Turkish-Tatar army commanded by Ibrahim Pasha seized the castle by exploding main bearing wall. Stronghold defenders all together with people sheltered inside fiercely resisted the assault and having been defeated in the aftermath were executed had their throats slashed. The Castle was burnt, fringe and entrance towers sustained most of the damage.

Guardians of then under aged Stefan Aleksander Potocki, castle’s owner, partially restored the enceinte on having Turks retreated. Rebuilding completed on the brink of the 18th century.

When the first subdivision of Poland occurs in 1772, Złoty Potok governing transitioned to Habsburg Austria. Around the year of 1840 therein castle owner, Olszewski, reconstructed the castle into the palace by design of Italian architect in the course of which part of the bulwark been destroyed and all the fine architectural details of masonry as baluster, baroque windows and doors trimming unscrupulously eradicated. On work having been completed, stone building appeared to be one story containing gin shop, Classic principal facade, and Victorian Gothic back yard and flank facades. Lime-trees were planted in the yard and some sculpture work installed. Walking into the enceinte one could find under the feet a bas-relief portrait of Polish poet and writer Adam Mickiewicz.

Currently, the castle is managed by the Castles of Ternopil Oblast National Reserve.

== Inheritance timeline ==
There is a long row of people that have left their impression on the castle existence.

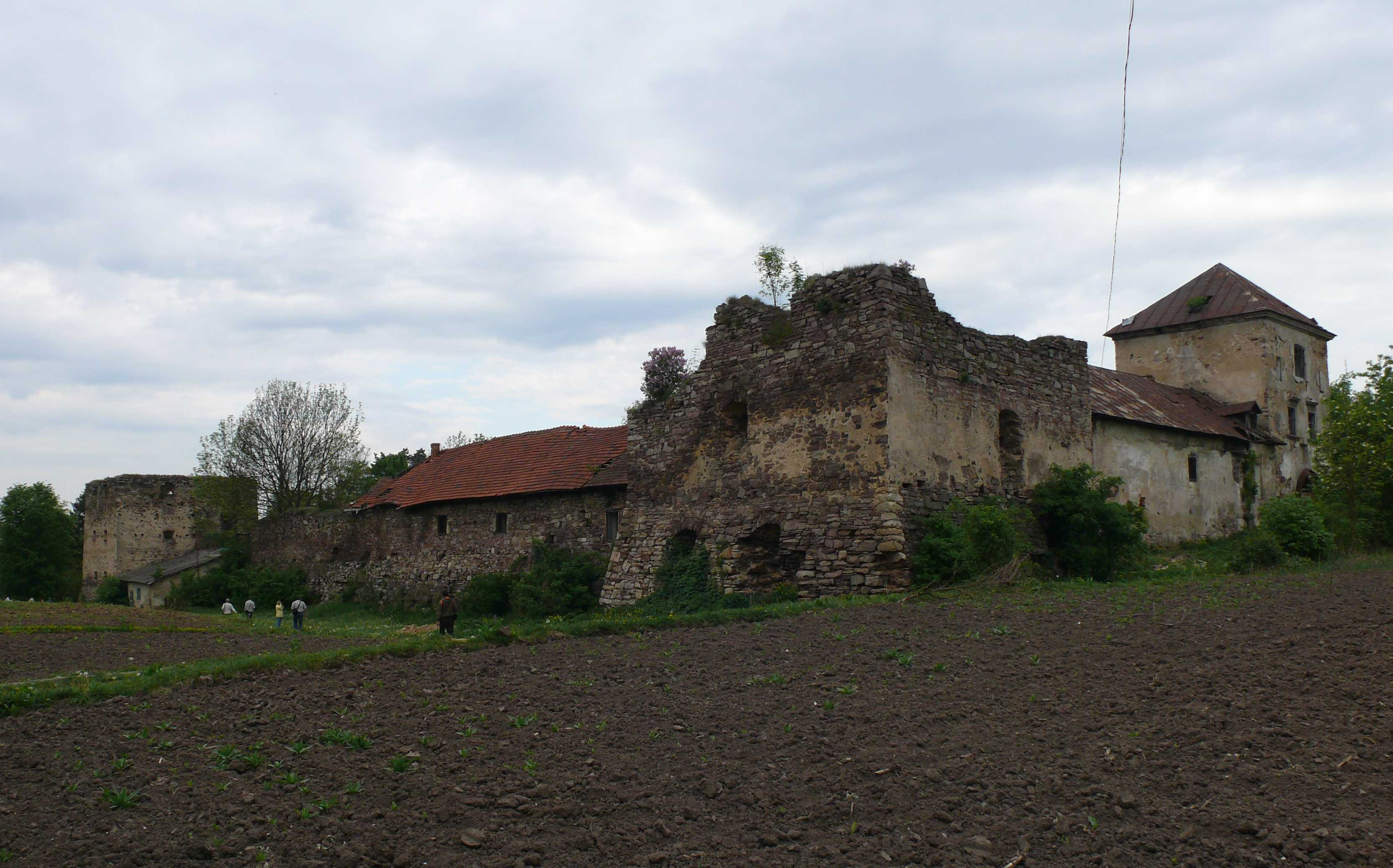
Castle, overcast weather

Castle owners' names
| Stefan Potocki and his spouse Maria Amalina Mohylanka | Jan Potocki, Ursula Potocki of Danylovich’s |
| Stefan Aleksander Potocki | Mykola Vasyl Potocki |
| Ignacy Potocki | Wincenty Potocki |
| Alexander Potocki | Ludwik Skvarchyński |
| Ignacy Skwarchyński | Tyburts'ush Skwarchyński |
| Jan Stojowski | Antony Maslowski |
| Israel Freedmen, Hasidic rabbi | Najid and other Freedmen family |
| Włodzimierz Hipolit Gniewosz and widow Maria Stephanie of Krzeczunowiczowie’s | Aleksander Gniewosz Junior and Antoni Gniewosz |
| Aleksander Gniewosz |

== Architectural snapshots ==
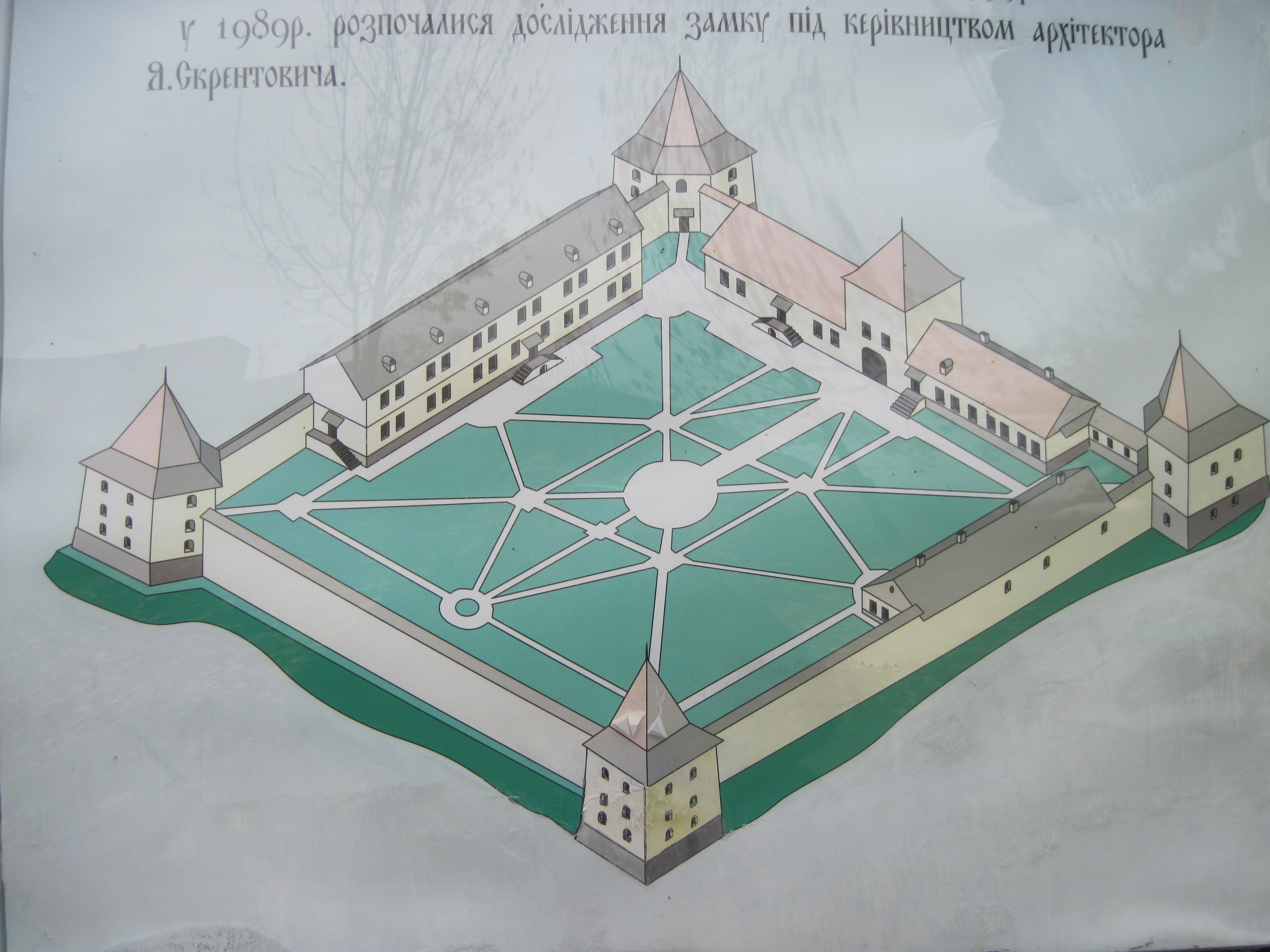
Castle schema

Złoty Potok (now Zolotyi Potik) Castle preserved well even though remained in desolation and partial ruination. This historic landmark positioned at the city's central headquarters nearby a rivulet falling into Złoty Potok pond. The villagers' residences located next to the stronghold bulwark. The castle has regular features and shaped in the form of rectangular. It was built out of local field stone of granite and auburn color. Bulwark thickness varied around 2 m (7 ft), and the corners of each wall has a tower with three levels of embrasures. The midsection of south north curtain wall contains a gate house being the style of Late Renaissance. Originally castle was of one story tall. The second story was added later. On the inside the gate ornamented with hereditary insignia of Potocki family, Piława.

Some sources inform that castle was inhabited at the end of 18th century. The western part of the castle yard housed a water well eliminated later in 19th century.

Castle views

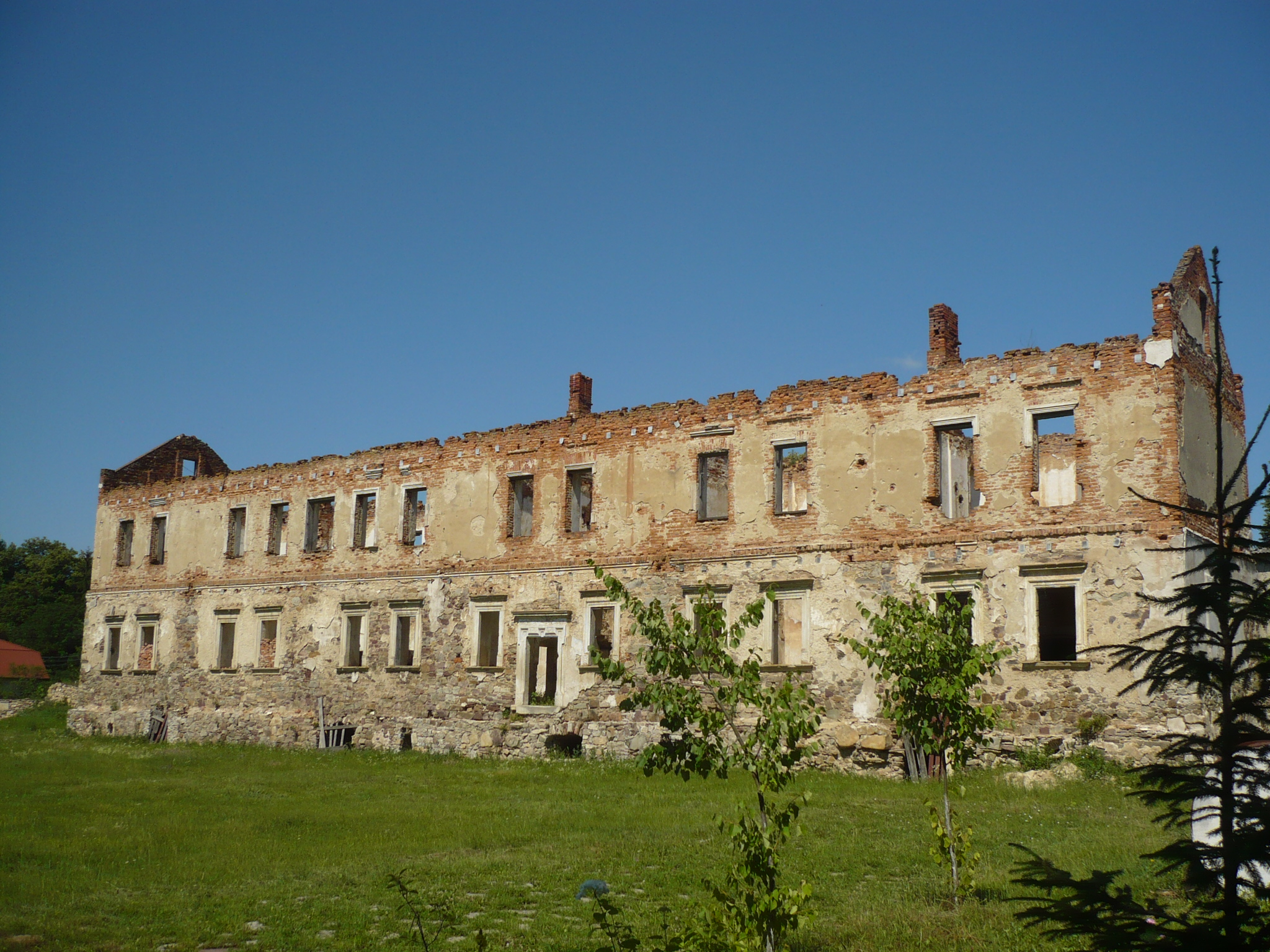

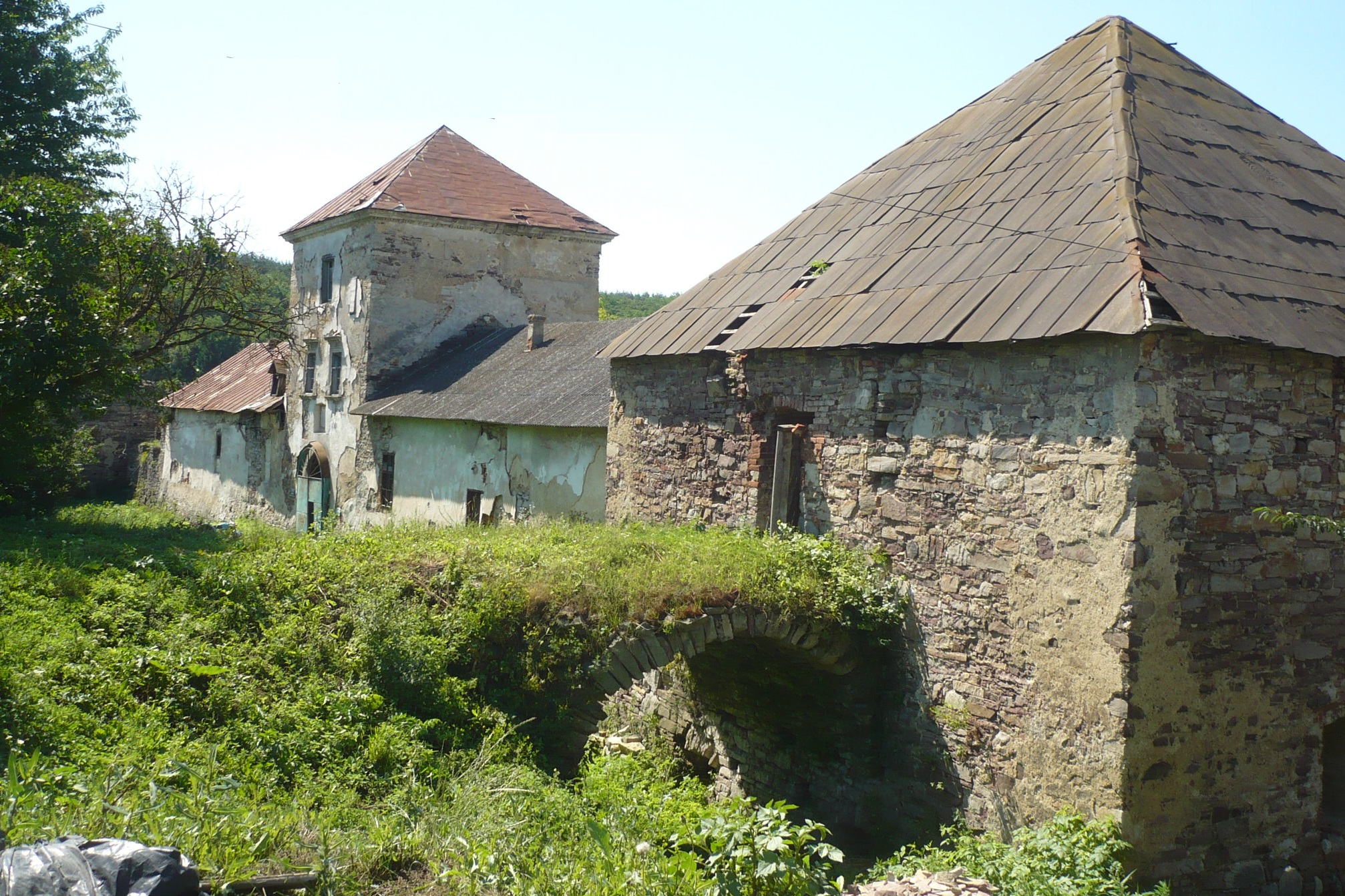

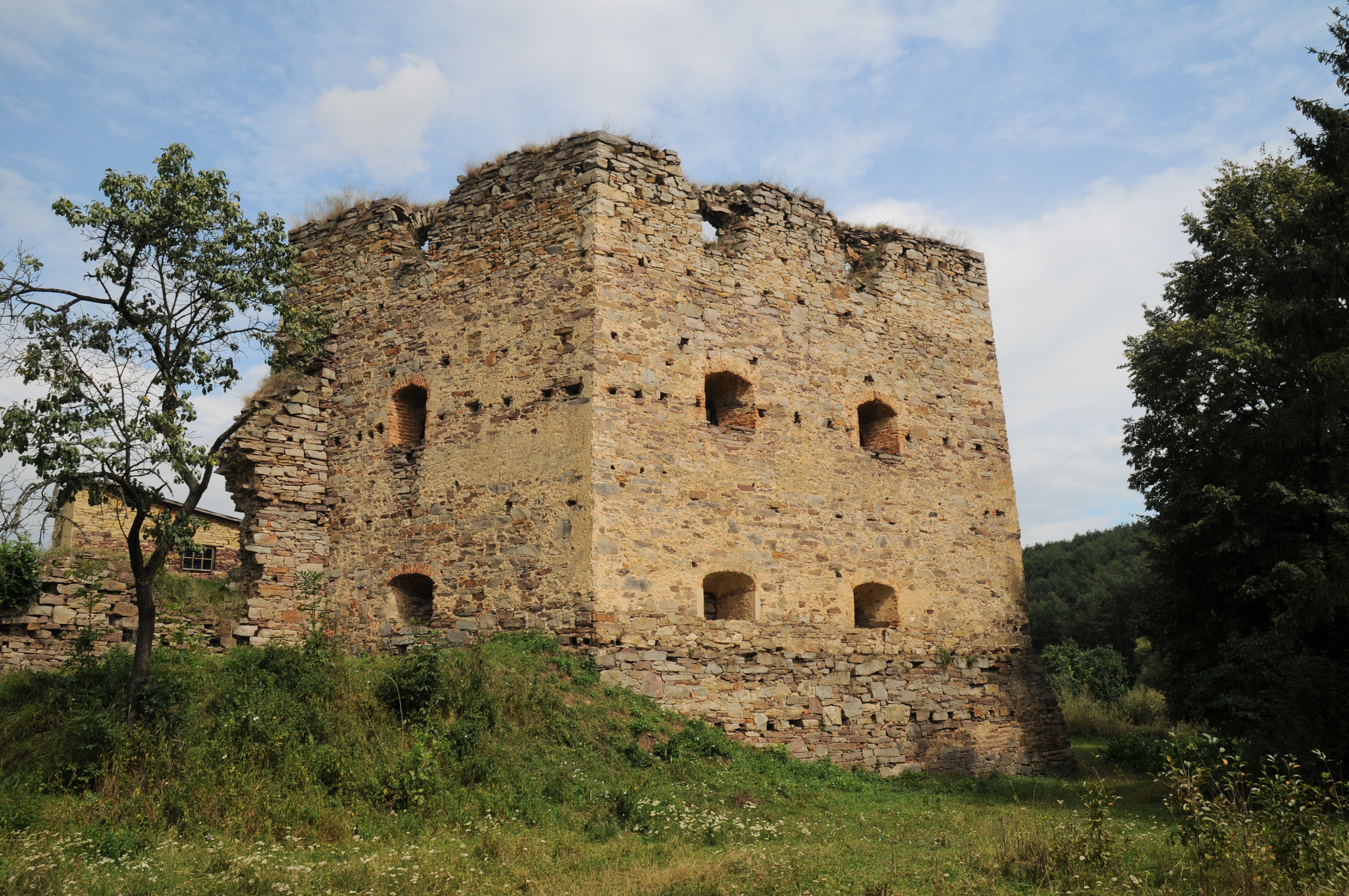

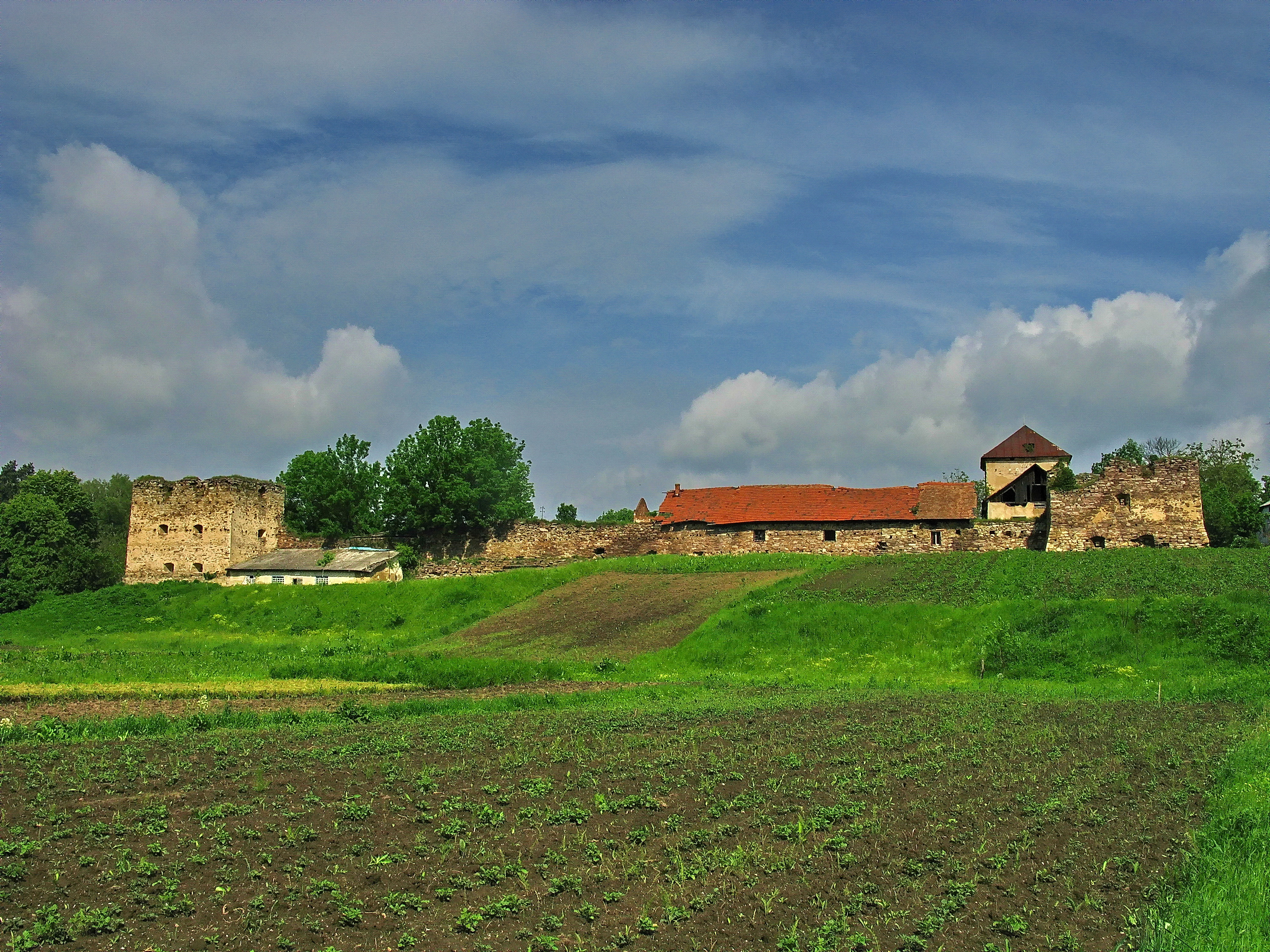

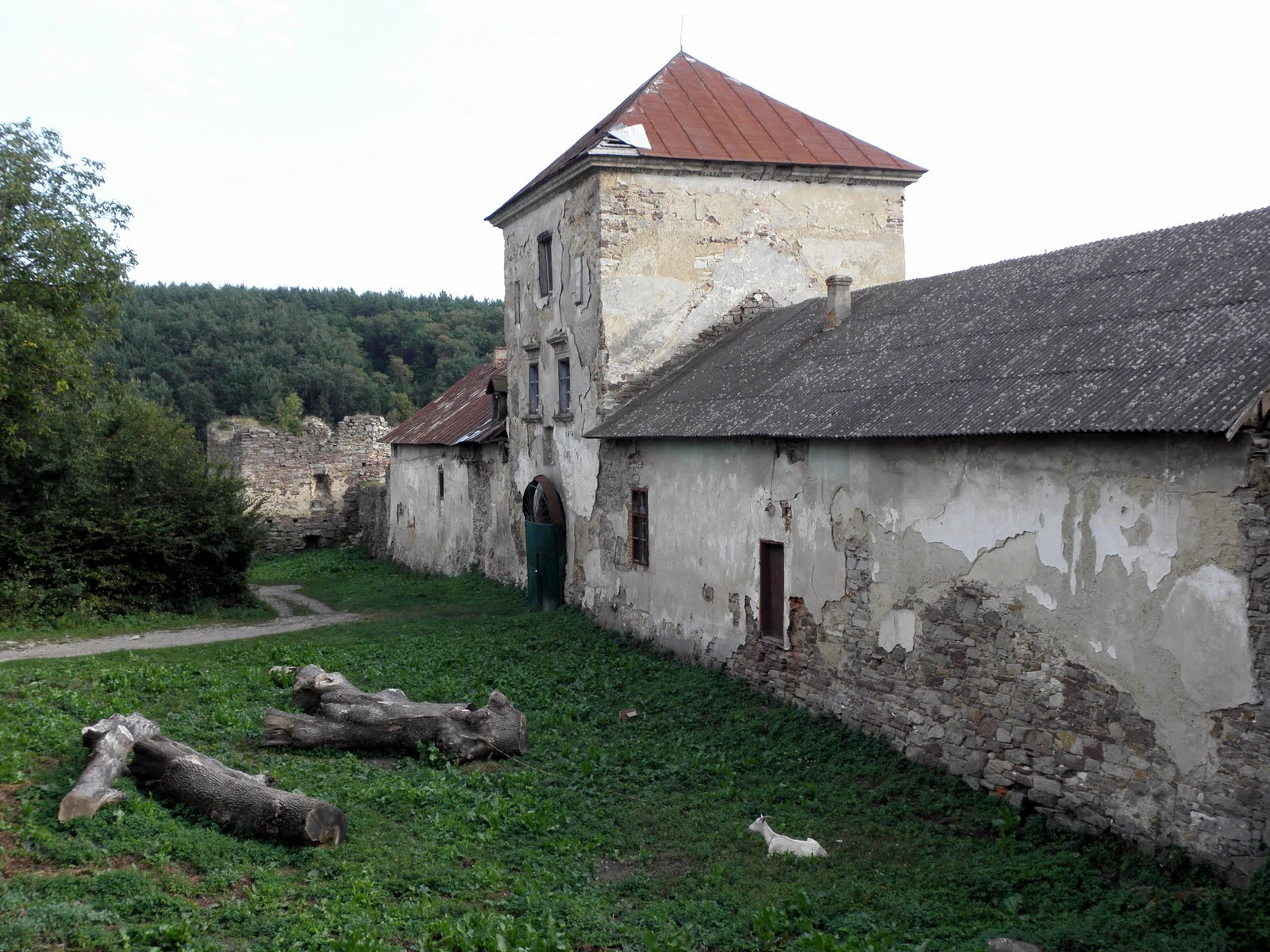

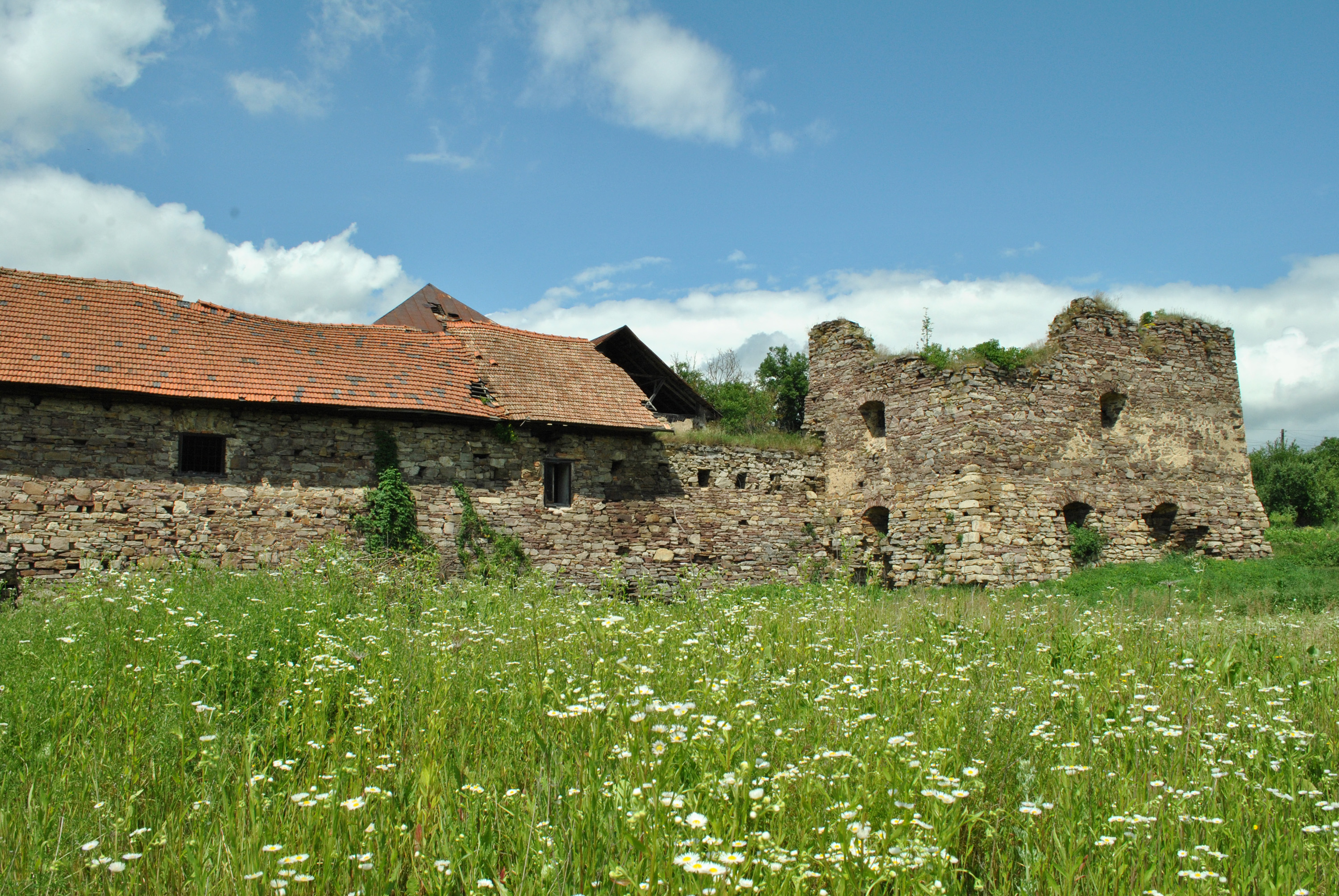

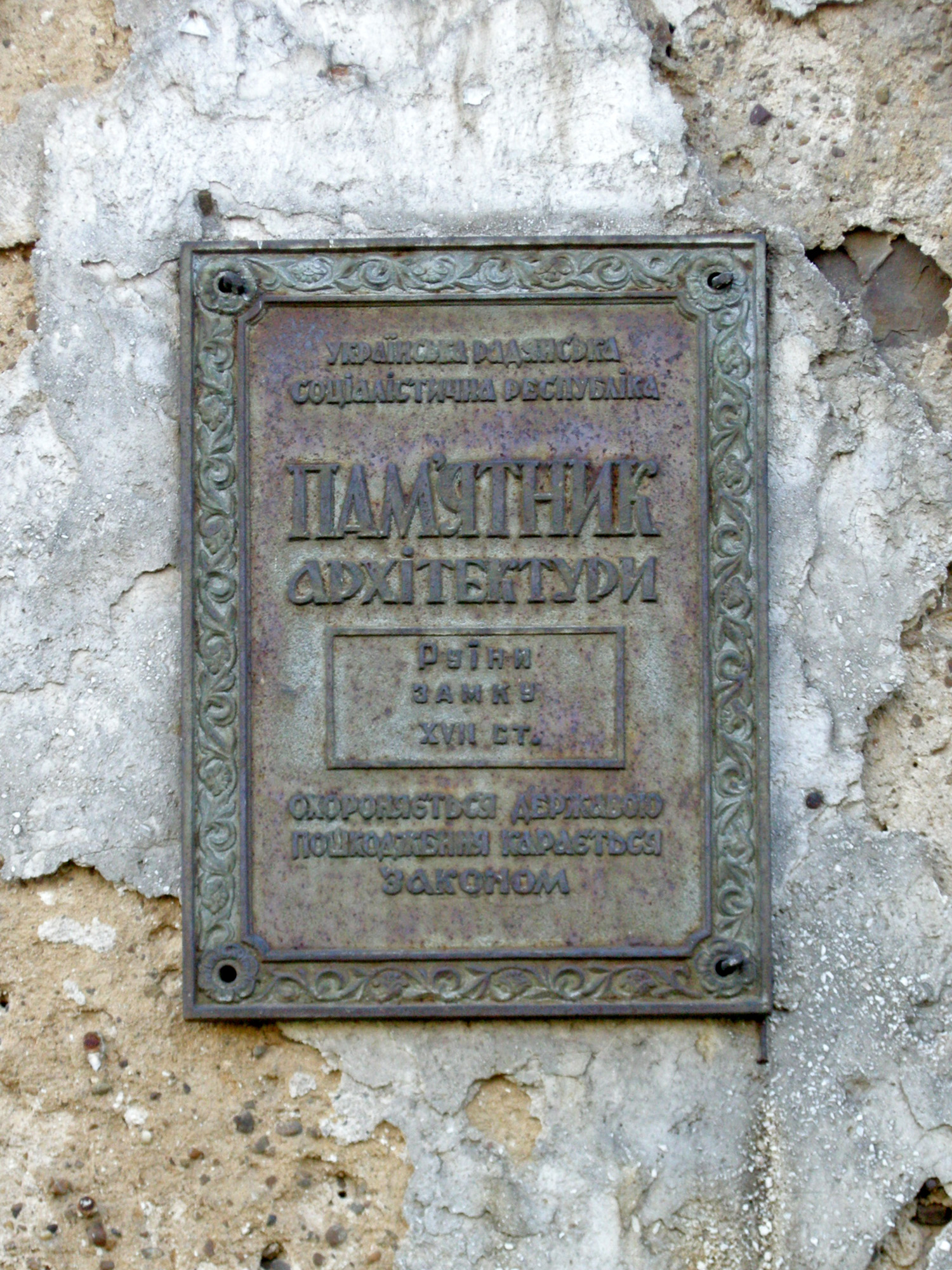

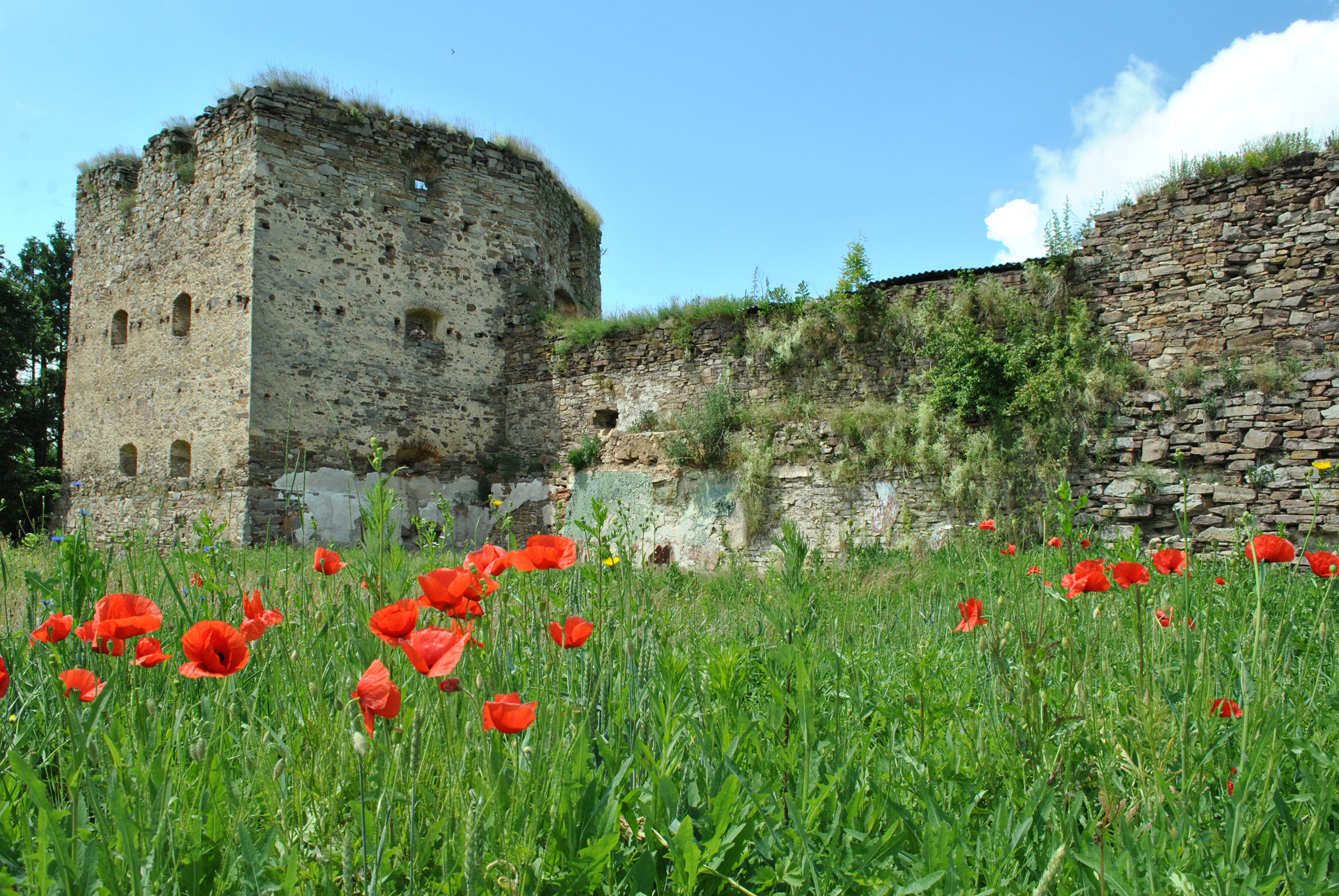

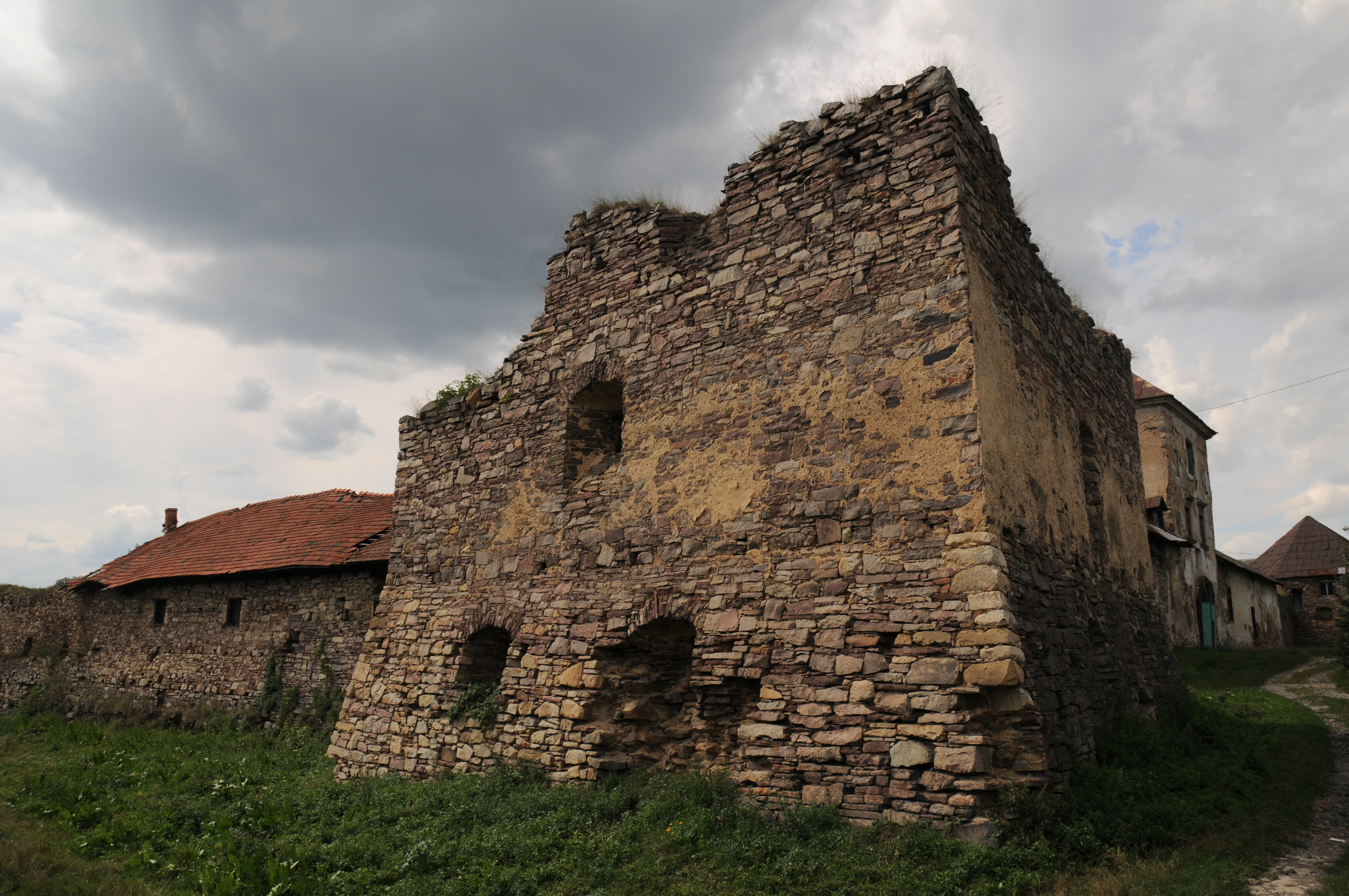

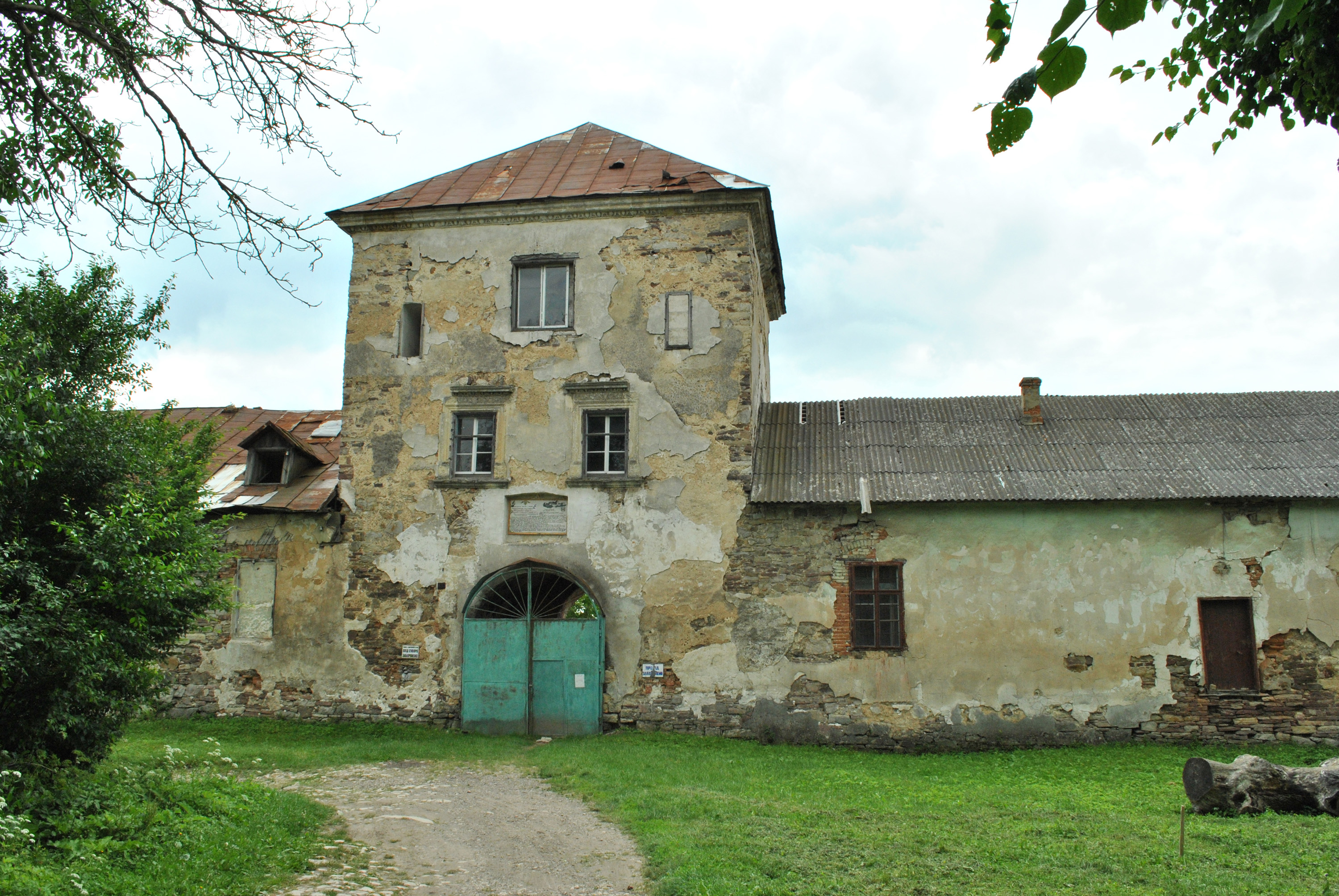

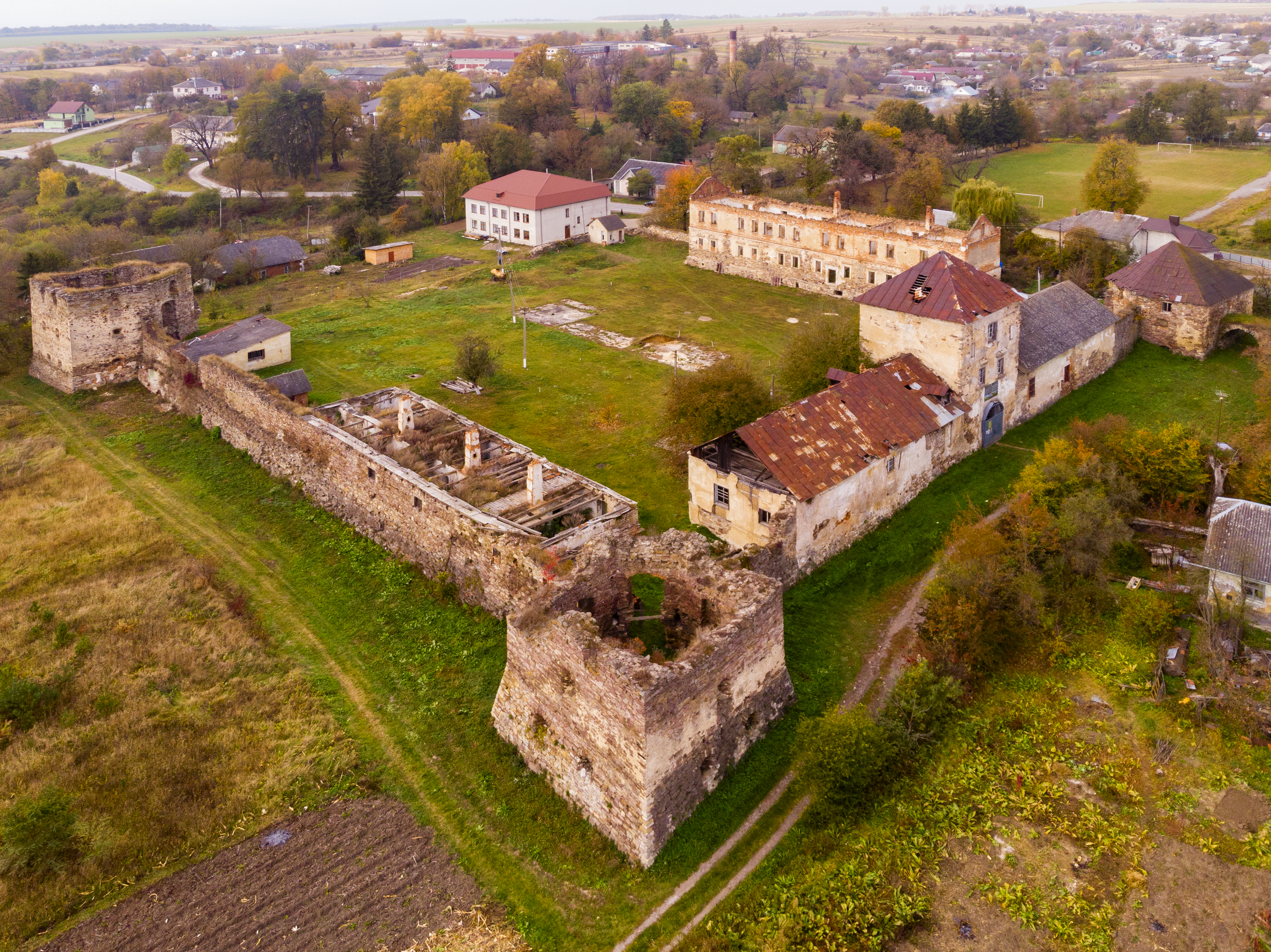

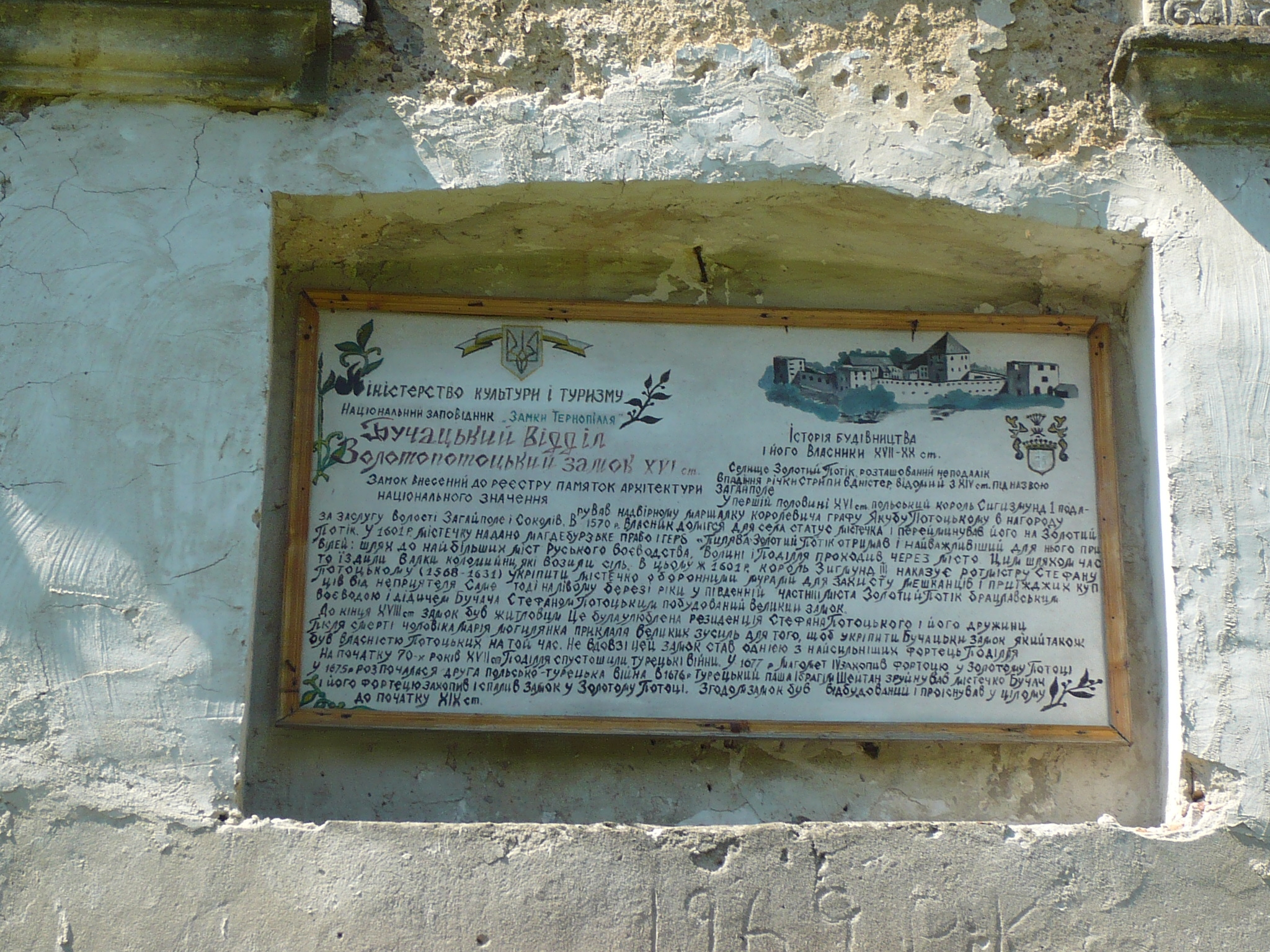
