= Horodnytsia =

Horodnytsia (Ukrainian: Городниця) is an inhabited locality in Ukraine and it may stand for:

== Rural settlement ==
- Horodnytsia in Zhytomyr Oblast, Zviahel Raion

== Villages ==
- Horodnytsia in Uman Raion, Cherkasy Oblast;
- Horodnytsia in Kolomyia Raion, Ivano-Frankivsk Oblast;
- Horodnytsia in Chortkiv Raion, Ternopil Oblast;
- Horodnytsia in Ternopil Raion, Ternopil Oblast;
- Horodnytsia in Nemyriv Raion, Vinnytsia Oblast.
