= Saints Cosmas and Damian Church, Staryi Skalat =

Ukrainian Orthodox church in Staryi Skalat, Ukraine

Saints Cosmas and Damian Church
- Церква святих великомучеників і безсрібників Косми і Даміана
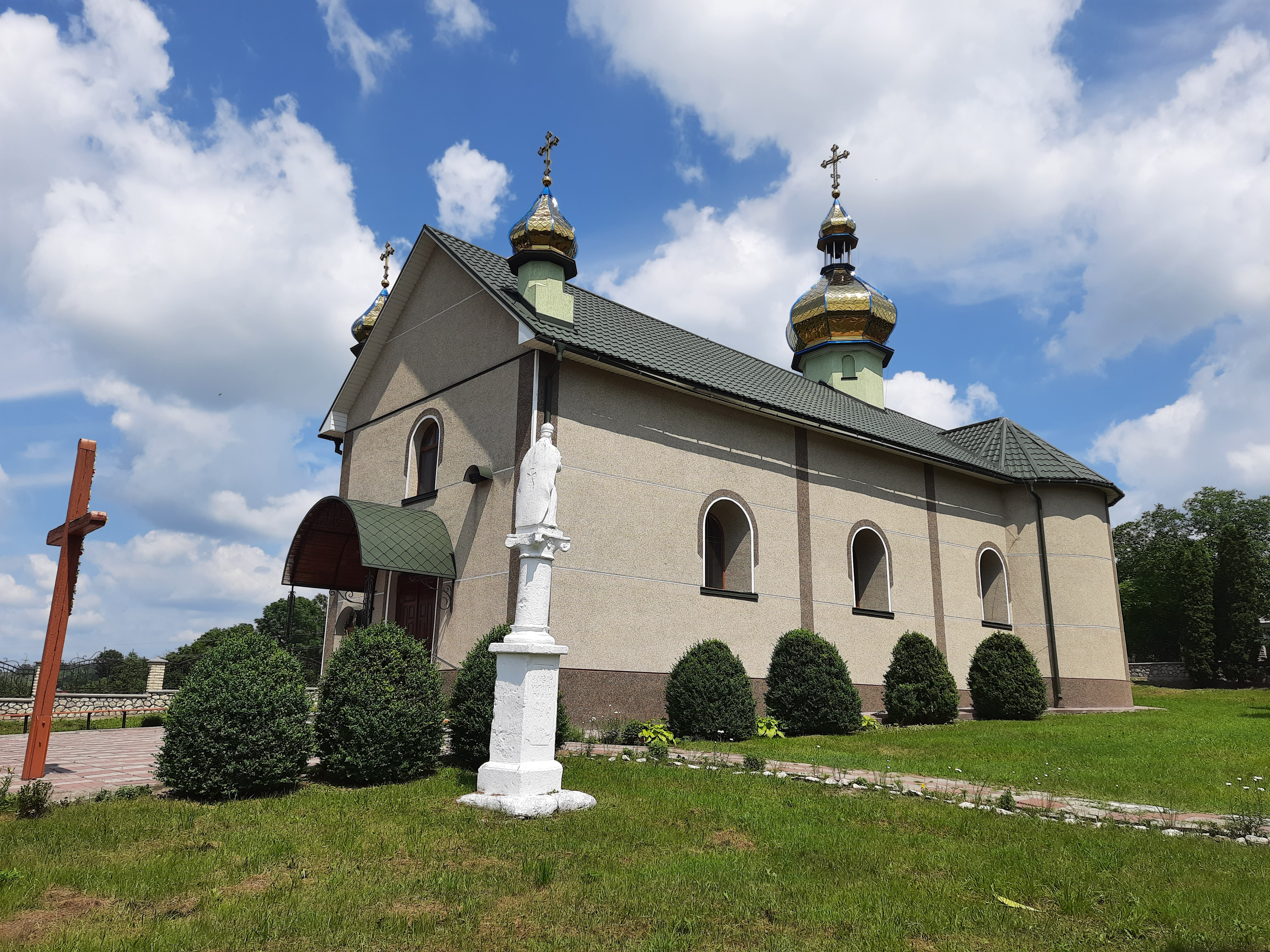

Religion
- Affiliation: Orthodox Church of Ukraine

Location
- Location: Staryi Skalat, Skalat urban hromada, Ternopil Raion, Ternopil Oblast, Ukraine

Architecture
- Completed: 1673

Saints Cosmas and Damian Church (Ukrainian: Церква святих великомучеників і безсрібників Косми і Даміана) is an Orthodox parish church (OCU) in Staryi Skalat, part of the Skalat urban hromada in Ternopil Raion,Ternopil Oblast, and is an architectural monument of local importance.

== History ==
The old church of the holy martyrs Cosmas and Damian, dating back to the fourth century, stands in the center of the village. It was built in 1673.

The parish house, where the family of at. Pylyp Kurbas lived, has been home to the Les Kurbas Memorial Museum-Estate for over twenty years.

During the ministry of at. Hryhorii Plykyda, an iconostasis was installed and the church was rebuilt.

Under the skillful pastoral care of at. Serhii Soroka, the church was repaired and painted inside.

With the assistance of the community, images of the patron saints were painted on the front side of the church, side domes were completed, and a small bell and Gospel were purchased.

One of the most important achievements of at. Petro Budzyla is the installation and consecration of a new iconostasis made in the ancient style.

== Priests ==
- at. Yosyp Mykulskyi (until 1864),
- at. Pylyp Kurbas (1864–1914),
- at. Hryhorii Plakyda (1914–1936),
- at. Yurii Karpinskyi (1936–1939),
- at. Yaroslav Roketskyi,
- at. Serhii Vorobkevych,
- at. Simeon Lisnychuk,
- at. Serhii Soroka,
- at. Hryhorii Halaiko (1985),
- at. Yosyp Kostetskyi (1988),
- at. Vasyl Blavatnyi (1995–1997),
- at. Petro Budzylo (since 1997).
