= Trybukhivtsi =

Trybukhivtsi may refer to the following places:

- Trybukhivtsi, Trybukhivtsi rural hromada, Chortkiv Raion, Ternopil Oblast, Ukraine
- Trybukhivtsi, Husiatyn settlement hromada, Chortkiv Raion, Ternopil Oblast, Ukraine
- Gmina Trybuchowce, Second Polish Republic

== See also ==
- Trybokivtsi, Lviv Oblast, Ukraine
