= Sydoriv Castle =

Ruin of castle in Ukraine, built in 1640s

Coordinates: 49°00′27″N 26°10′12″E

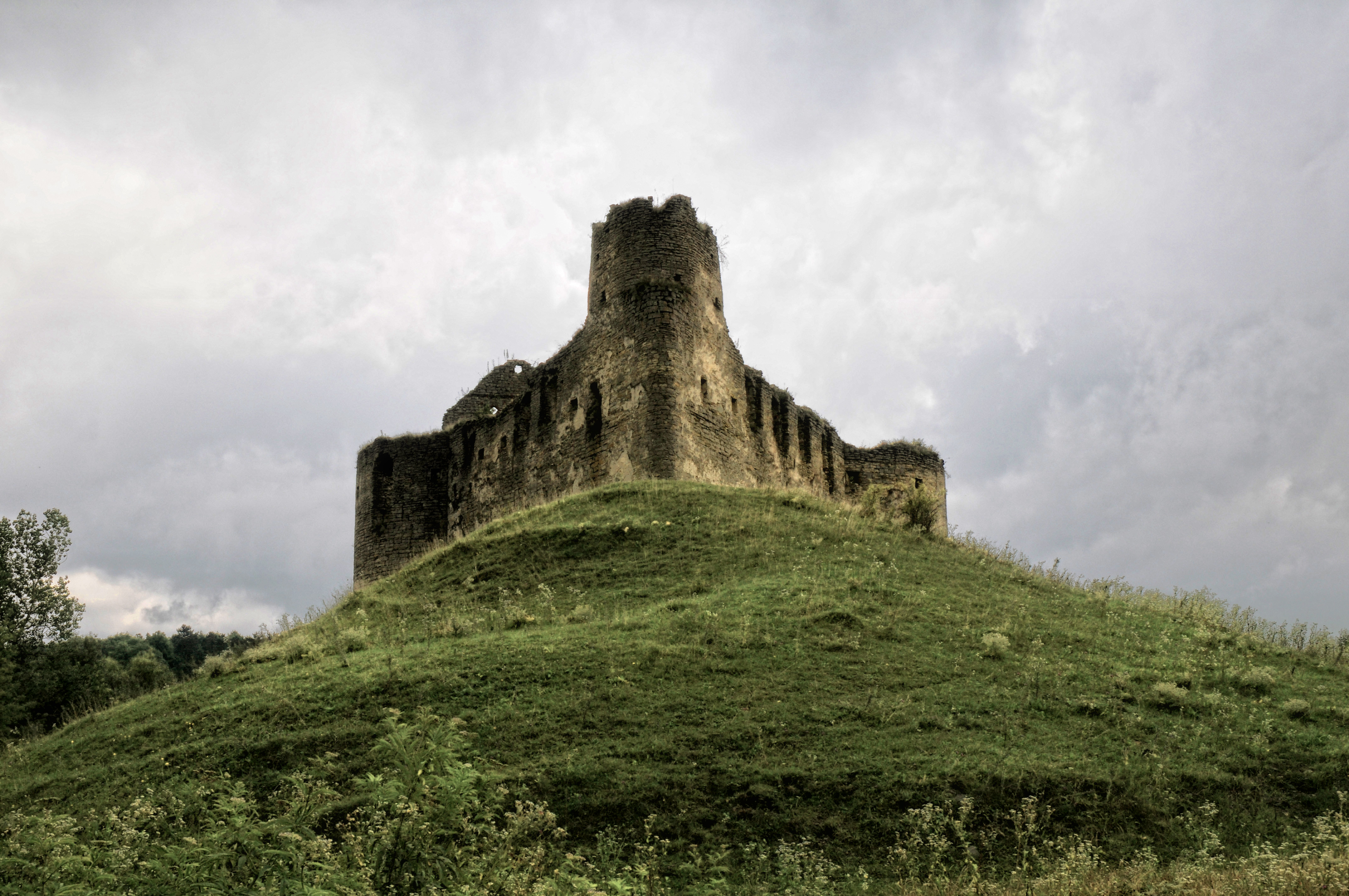
The castle's watchtower.

The Sydoriv Castle (Ukrainian: Сидорівський замок; Polish: Zamek w Sidorowie) is a ruin of a stronghold built by Marcin Kalinowski in Sydoriv, a village located 7 km south of Husiatyn. The castle is perched on a hilltop which is enclosed on three sides by a river. When built in the 1640s, the structure had seven towers that extended for 178 metres from north to south. It was heavily damaged by the invading Turks in 1672 and was abandoned by its owners in the 18th century.
