= Teklivka, Ternopil Raion, Ternopil Oblast =

Rural locality in Ternopil Oblast, Ukraine

Teklivka Теклівка
- Location in Ternopil Oblast
- Coordinates: 49°25′39″N 25°51′51″E
- Country: Ukraine
- Oblast: Ternopil Oblast
- Raion: Ternopil Raion
- Hromada: Skalat urban hromada
- Time zone: UTC+2 (EET)
  - Summer (DST): UTC+3 (EEST)
- Postal code: 47850

Teklivka (Ukrainian: Теклівка) is a village in Skalat urban hromada, Ternopil Raion, Ternopil Oblast, Ukraine.

== History ==
The first written mention of the village was in 1578.

After the liquidation of the Pidvolochysk Raion on 19 July 2020, the village became part of the Ternopil Raion.

== Religion ==
- Saints Peter and Paul church (2011, brick).

== Sources ==
- (in Ukrainian) В. Уніят В., Теклівка // Ternopil Encyclopedic Dictionary: in 4 v. / editorial board: H. Yavorskyi and other, Ternopil: "Zbruch", 2008, V. 3: П—Я, S. 389. — ISBN 978-966-528-279-2.
- "Teklówka". Geographical Dictionary of the Kingdom of Poland (in Polish). 12. Warszawa: Kasa im. Józefa Mianowskiego. 1892. p. 280.
