= Mytnytsia, Ternopil Oblast =

Rural locality in Ternopil Oblast, Ukraine

Mytnytsia Митниця
- Location in Ternopil Oblast
- Coordinates: 49°24′48″N 25°51′55″E
- Country: Ukraine
- Oblast: Ternopil Oblast
- Raion: Ternopil Raion
- Hromada: Skalat urban hromada
- Time zone: UTC+2 (EET)
  - Summer (DST): UTC+3 (EEST)
- Postal code: 47850

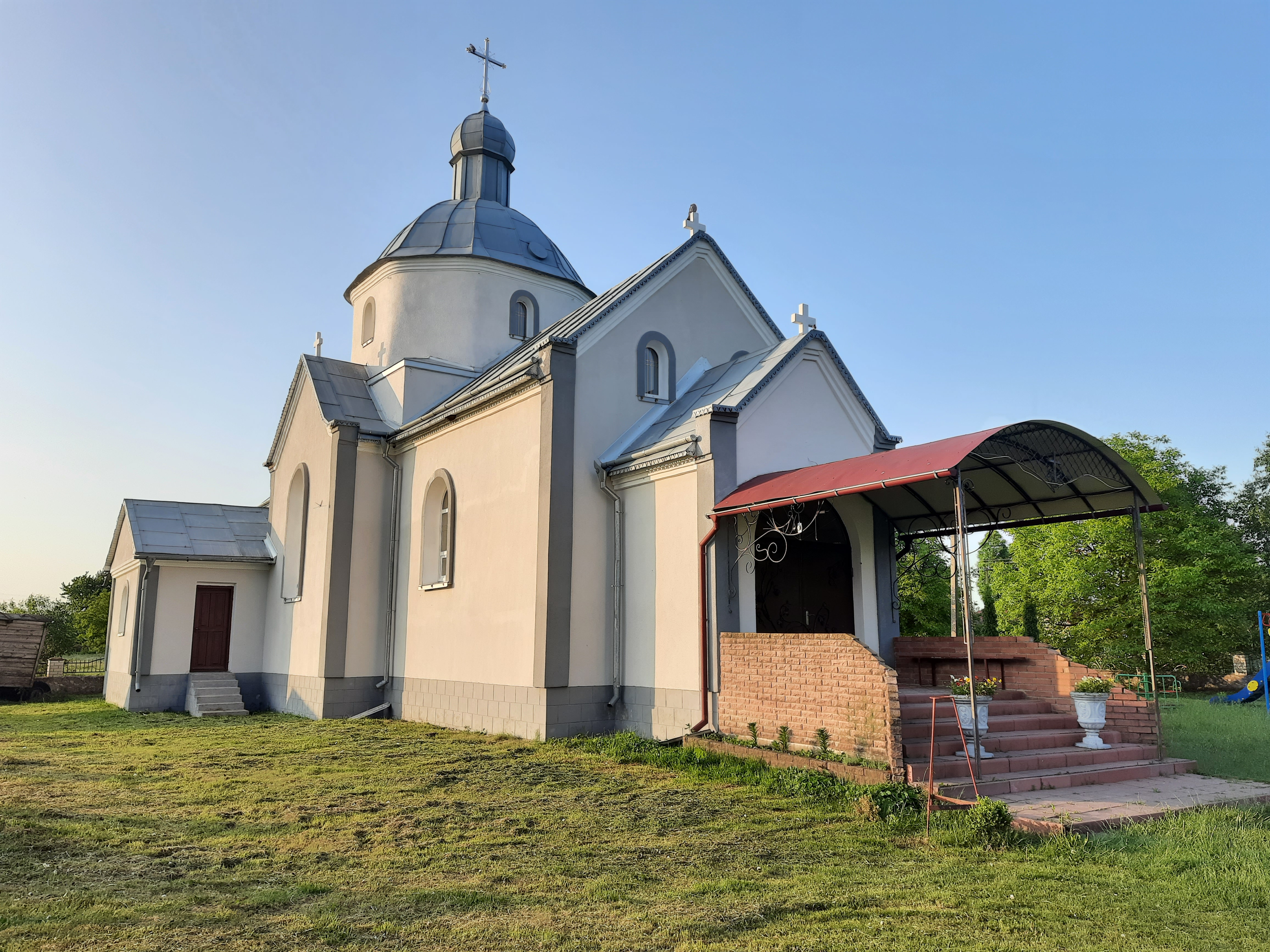
Church of the Nativity of John the Baptist, Mytnytsia village, Ternopil

Mytnytsia (Ukrainian: Митниця) is a village in Skalat urban hromada, Ternopil Raion, Ternopil Oblast, Ukraine.

== History ==
The first written mention of the village was in 1678.

After the liquidation of the Pidvolochysk Raion on 19 July 2020, the village became part of the Ternopil Raion.

== Religion ==
- Church of the Nativity of John the Baptist (1995, brick, UGCC).

== Sources ==
- (in Ukrainian) Года Р., Митниця // Ternopil Encyclopedic Dictionary: in 4 v. / editorial board: H. Yavorskyi and other, Ternopil: "Zbruch", 2005, V. 2: К—О, S. 519. — ISBN 966-528-199-2.
