= Ostapie, Ternopil Oblast =

Rural locality in Ternopil Oblast, Ukraine

Ostapie Остап'є
- Location in Ternopil Oblast
- Coordinates: 49°22′43″N 26°2′9″E
- Country: Ukraine
- Oblast: Ternopil Oblast
- Raion: Ternopil Raion
- Hromada: Skalat urban hromada
- Time zone: UTC+2 (EET)
  - Summer (DST): UTC+3 (EEST)
- Postal code: 47861

Ostapie (Ukrainian: Остап'є) is a village in Skalat urban hromada, Ternopil Raion, Ternopil Oblast, Ukraine.

== History ==
The first written mention of the village was in 1560.

After the liquidation of the Pidvolochysk Raion on 19 July 2020, the village became part of the Ternopil Raion.

== Religion ==
- St. Michael church (1905, brick; consecrated by Metropolitan Andrei Sheptytskyi, UGCC),
- Church of Our Lady of Perpetual Help and St. Wenceslas (1901, restored in 1992).

== Sources ==
- Савончак П. В. Остап'є // Encyclopedia of Modern Ukraine [Електронний ресурс] / Редкол. : І. М. Дзюба, А. І. Жуковський, М. Г. Железняк [та ін.]; НАН України, НТШ. — К. : Інститут енциклопедичних досліджень НАН України, 2022.
- (in Ukrainian) Бігус М., Дем'янчук З., Уніят Г., Остап'є // Ternopil Encyclopedic Dictionary: in 4 v. / editorial board: H. Yavorskyi and other, Ternopil: "Zbruch", 2005, V. 2: К—О, S. 693. — ISBN 966-528-199-2.
- "Ostapie, pow. skałacki". Geographical Dictionary of the Kingdom of Poland (in Polish). 7. Warszawa: Kasa im. Józefa Mianowskiego. 1886. p. 661.
