= Polupanivka =

Rural locality in Ternopil Oblast, Ukraine

Polupanivka Полупанівка
- Location in Ternopil Oblast
- Coordinates: 49°28′42″N 25°58′14″E
- Country: Ukraine
- Oblast: Ternopil Oblast
- Raion: Ternopil Raion
- Hromada: Skalat urban hromada
- Time zone: UTC+2 (EET)
  - Summer (DST): UTC+3 (EEST)
- Postal code: 47875

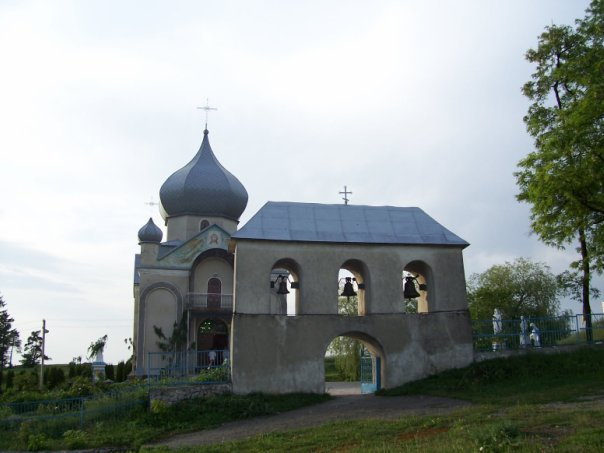
Church in Polupanivka

Polupanivka (Ukrainian: Полупанівка) is a village in Skalat urban hromada, Ternopil Raion, Ternopil Oblast, Ukraine.

== History ==
The first written mention of the village was in 1580.

After the liquidation of the Pidvolochysk Raion on 19 July 2020, the village became part of the Ternopil Raion.

== Religion ==
On the Sviata Mount, which is a place of pilgrimage, there is the Holy Trinity church (1878, brick, rebuilt from a chapel in 1989, OCU), the Saint Joseph church (1894, rebuilt in 1991, RCC), a healing spring, and the Way of the Cross (2010).

== Notable residents ==
- Eugenie Schwarzwald (1872–1940), Austrian philanthropist, writer and pedagogue, she developed education for girls in Austria and was one of the most learned women of her time

== Sources ==
- (in Ukrainian) Мельничук Б., Уніят В., Полупанівка // Ternopil Encyclopedic Dictionary: in 4 v. / editorial board: H. Yavorskyi and other, Ternopil: "Zbruch", 2008, V. 3: П—Я, S. 112. — ISBN 978-966-528-279-2.
