= Podillia, Ternopil Raion, Ternopil Oblast =

Rural locality in Ternopil Oblast, Ukraine

Podillia Поділля
- Location in Ternopil Oblast
- Coordinates: 49°23′22″N 25°56′12″E
- Country: Ukraine
- Oblast: Ternopil Oblast
- Raion: Ternopil Raion
- Hromada: Skalat urban hromada
- Time zone: UTC+2 (EET)
  - Summer (DST): UTC+3 (EEST)
- Postal code: 47860

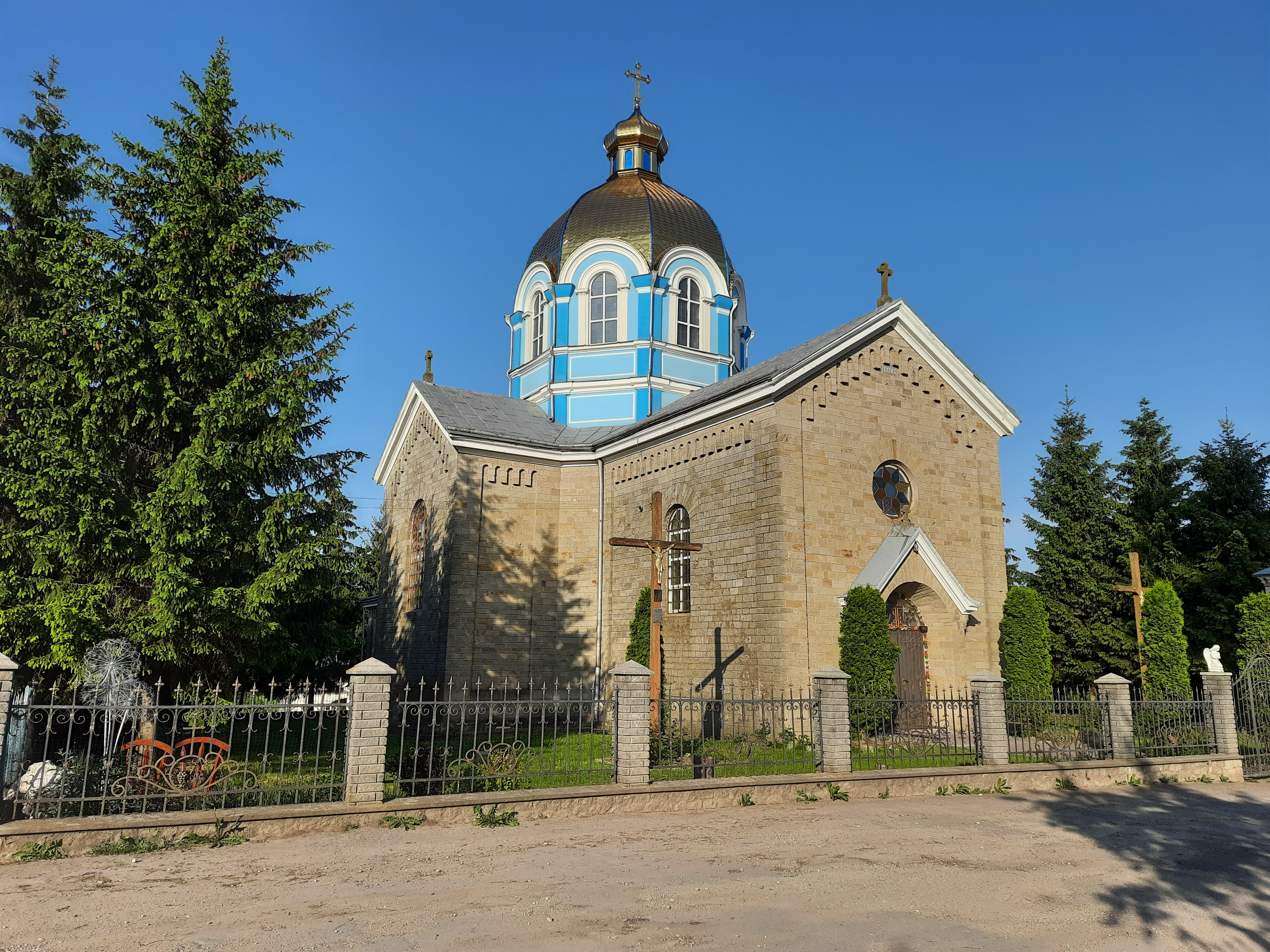
Church of the Assumption of the Virgin Mary (1907), Podillia village (Skalatska urban community), Ternopil district, Ternopil.

Podillia (Ukrainian: Поділля; until 1960, Piznanka) is a village in Skalat urban hromada, Ternopil Raion, Ternopil Oblast, Ukraine.

== History ==
The first written mention of the village was in 1574.

After the liquidation of the Pidvolochysk Raion on 19 July 2020, the village became part of the Ternopil Raion.

== Religion ==
- Church and Chapel of the Assumption (1907, brick, OCU; 2014, UGCC).

== Sources ==
- (in Ukrainian) Уніят В., Яськів П., Поділля // Ternopil Encyclopedic Dictionary: in 4 v. / editorial board: H. Yavorskyi and other, Ternopil: "Zbruch", 2008, V. 3: П—Я, S. 102. — ISBN 978-966-528-279-2.
- "o wsi w h. Skałat". Geographical Dictionary of the Kingdom of Poland (in Polish). 10. Warszawa: Kasa im. Józefa Mianowskiego. 1889. p. 644.
- "Poznanka 2.) P. Gniła". Geographical Dictionary of the Kingdom of Poland (in Polish). 8. Warszawa: Kasa im. Józefa Mianowskiego. 1887. p. 959.
