= Sydoriv =

Sydoriv Сидорів
- Village
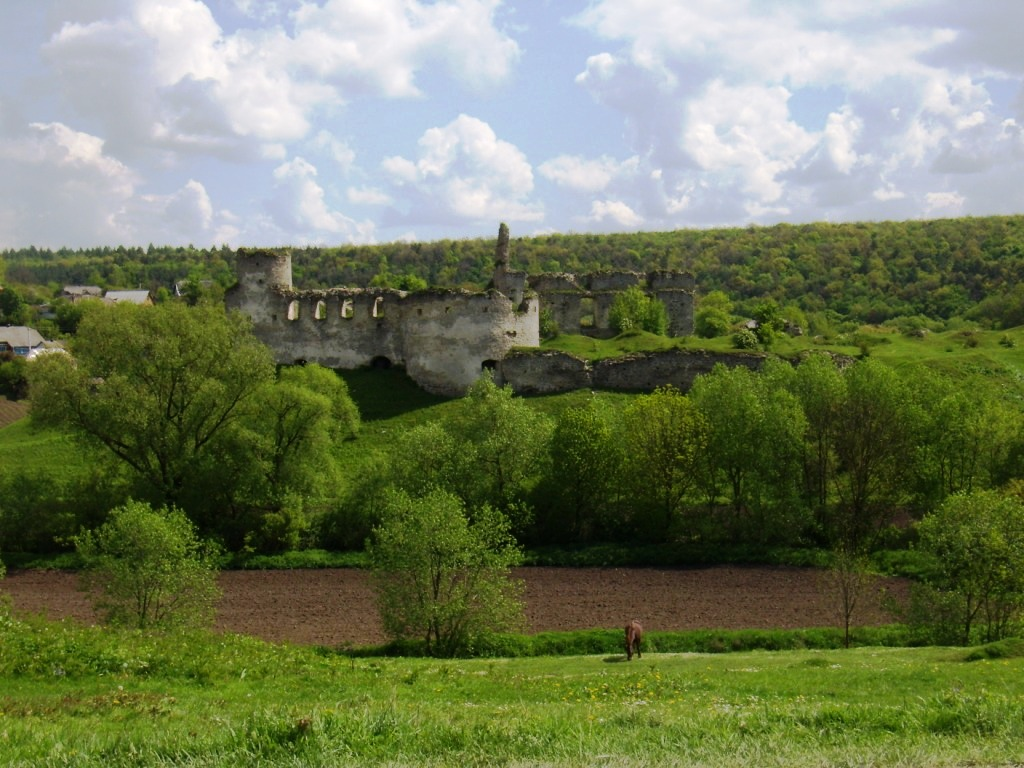

- Location within Ternopil Oblast
- Coordinates: 49°00′46″N 26°10′01″E
- Country: Ukraine
- Oblast: Ternopil Oblast
- District: Chortkiv Raion
- Established: 1380

Population
  - Total: 1,125
- Time zone: UTC+2 (EET)
  - Summer (DST): UTC+3 (EEST)
- Postal code: 48208
- Area code: +380 3557

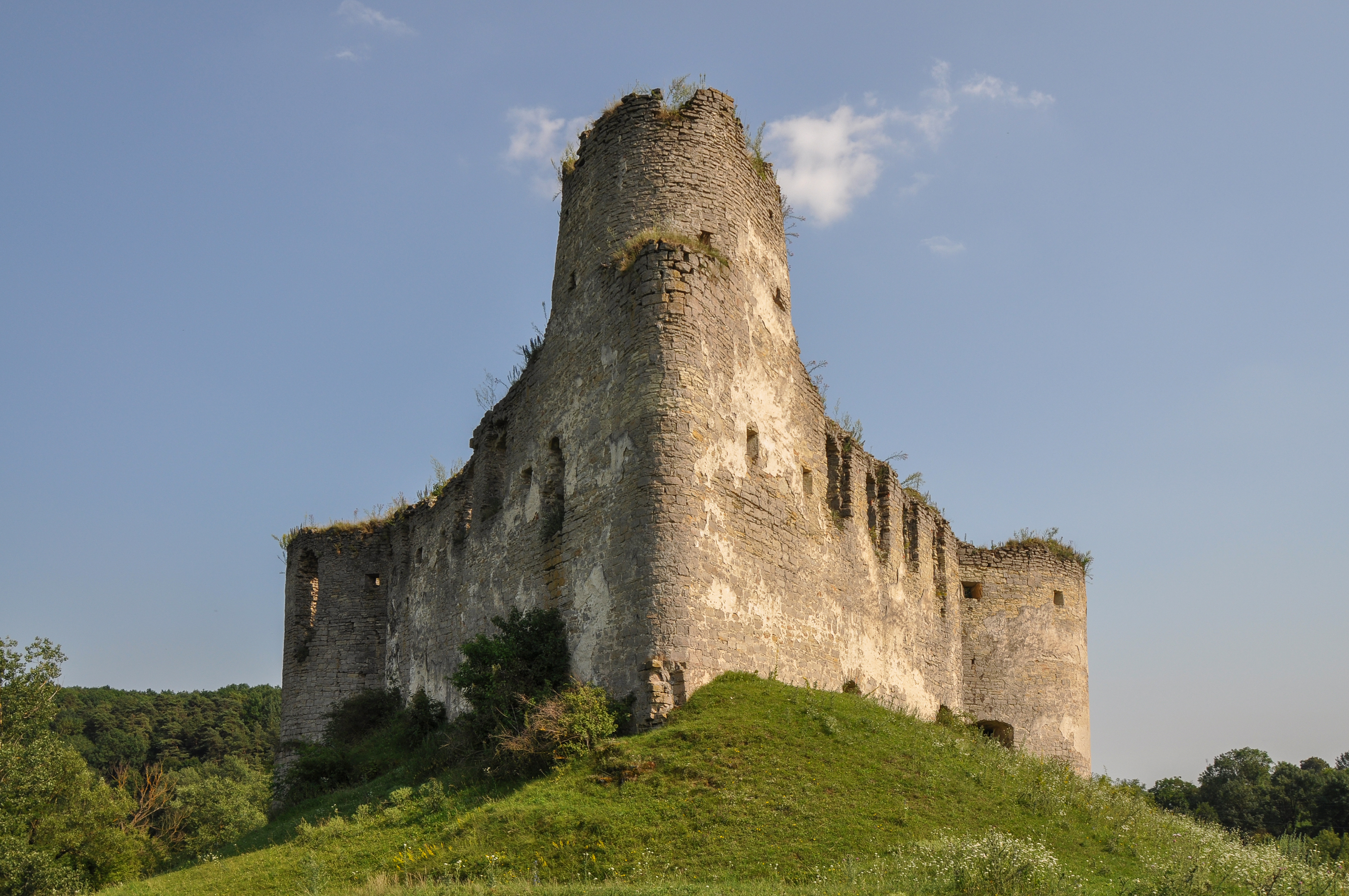
Sydoriv Castle

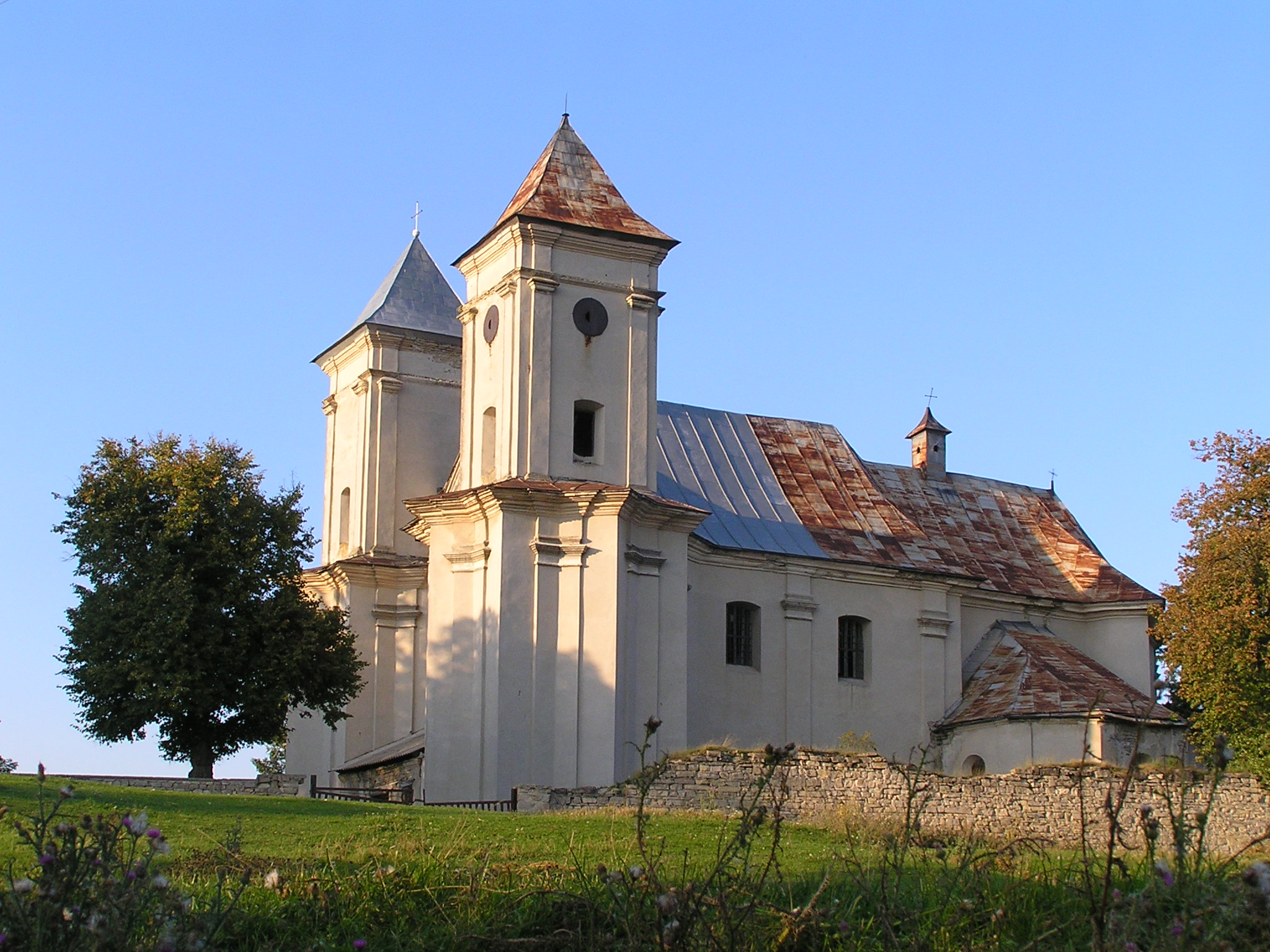
Saint Mary church

Sydoriv (Ukrainian: Сидорів; Polish: Sidorów) is a village located on the right bank of the Zbruch River in Chortkiv Raion (district) of Ternopil Oblast (province in western Ukraine). It belongs to Husiatyn settlement hromada, one of the hromadas of Ukraine. Sydoriv is known primarily as the location of the Sydoriv Castle.

Until 18 July 2020, Sydoriv belonged to Husiatyn Raion. The raion was abolished in July 2020 as part of the administrative reform of Ukraine, which reduced the number of raions of Ternopil Oblast to three. The area of Husiatyn Raion was merged into Chortkiv Raion.

== History ==
The first written mention is on October 7, 1398.

On April 5, 1547, Polish King Sigismund I the Old granted a privilege to Jakub Potocki to found the town of Sydoriv. At the same time, he introduced weekly markets in the town on Saturday and annual markets on the feast of Jadwiga.

The history of Sydoriv is primarily associated with the Kalynovskyi family of the Kalyniv coat of arms.

The representative of the family was the general of the Podillia lands Valentyn-Alexander Kalynovskyi (his wife Elżbieta Strus. They had three sons, the youngest of whom, Marcin, became a Polish crown hetman and inherited many lands in Podillia after his brothers' deaths: Vinnytsia, Uman, and the family castle in Sydoriv. Here, in 1640, the hetman ordered a stone castle to be built on the top of an island formed by the rivers Sukhodil and Slobidka (now only ruins remain).

In 1672, the castle was taken by the Turks, and in 1673 it was recaptured by the troops of the Polish-Lithuanian Commonwealth. For three years, Jan Samuel Chrzanowski and his wife Anna, who later distinguished herself in the defense of Terebovlia Castle in 1676, were the commandant here. Jan Chrzanowski left the castle, which was again occupied by the Turks, who significantly destroyed it. Later the castle was rebuilt with the assistance of another representative of the Kalynowski family, the Kamianets castellan Marcin Kalynowski, who allocated funds for the construction of an unusual church, where both of them were later buried. After the death of the owner, Ludwik Kalynowski, Sidoriv was passed to his daughter Tekla, who was married to Belski, and later to her daughter Aniela Myachynska.

Later, in the early nineteenth century, the castle was bought by Ignacy Paigert, and thus Sydoriv passed to the Paigert family, to whom it belonged until 1941. The poet and artist Josef Peigert had a huge library here. The last members of the Peigert family did not care about the castle, and it began to decay.

In 1840, Peigert built a new palace in the west of Sydoriv, with a park and a fountain near the palace. In the nineteenth century, the settlement had its own symbolism: a seal depicting a tree with a plowman standing under it (several copies of this seal, dated 1870, have been preserved in the collection of documents of local historian Antonii Schneider).

On July 25, 1920, in the battle near Sydoriv, a separate cavalry division of the UPR army completely defeated the enemy Bolshevik cavalry and two regiments of Bolshevik infantry of the 123rd Infantry Brigade, along with their commanders. Branches of the Ukrainian societies Prosvita, Sich, Sokil, Luh, and others were operating.
