= Staryi Skalat =

Rural locality in Ternopil Oblast, Ukraine

Staryi Skalat Старий Скалат
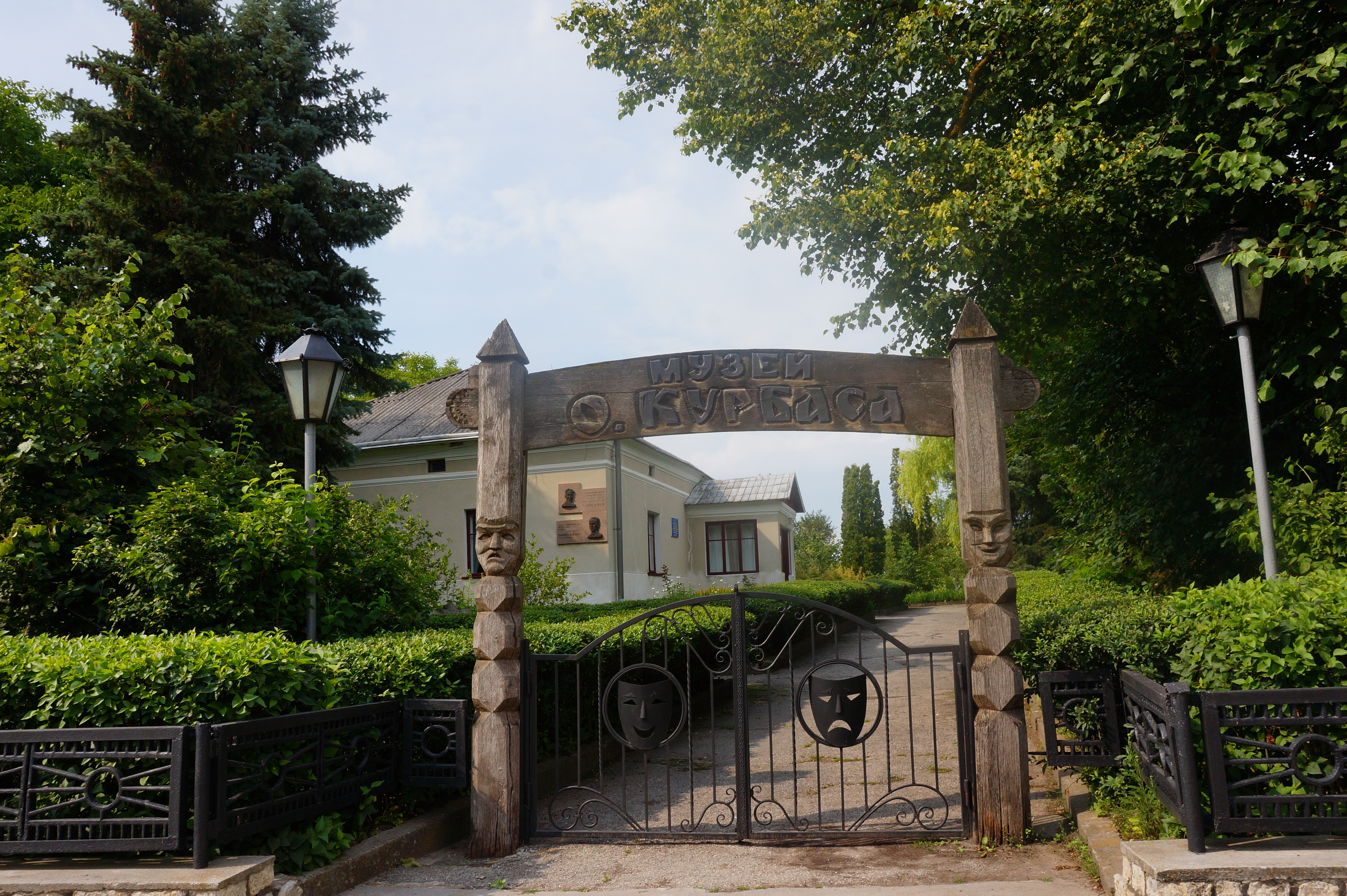
- Les Kurbas Memorial Museum-Estate

- Location in Ternopil Oblast
- Coordinates: 49°27′50″N 25°58′56″E
- Country: Ukraine
- Oblast: Ternopil Oblast
- Raion: Ternopil Raion
- Hromada: Skalat Hromada
- Time zone: UTC+2 (EET)
  - Summer (DST): UTC+3 (EEST)
- Postal code: 47845

Staryi Skalat (Ukrainian: Старий Скалат) is a village in Ukraine, Ternopil Oblast, Ternopil Raion, Skalat urban hromada.

== History ==
According to legend, the village, which was the predecessor of Skalat, was destroyed by the Tatars in the second half of the 15th century. Around 1545 a new village appeared on the site of the destroyed settlement, which was later called eventually became known as Staryi Skalat, unlike Skalat.

In the middle of the 17th century, during the National Liberation Revolution led by Bohdan Khmelnytsky, Maksym Kryvonis' Cossack detachments were stationed in Staryi Skalat.

== Religion ==
- Saints Cosmas and Damian church (1634, brick)
- Roman Catholic Church of Blessed Jakub Strepa (1912)

== People ==
=== Lived ===
- Les Kurbas (1887–1937), Ukrainian movie and theater director

== Sources ==
- (in Ukrainian) П. Гуцал, М. Ханас., Шляхтинці // Ternopil Encyclopedic Dictionary: in 4 v. / editorial board: H. Yavorskyi and other, Ternopil: "Zbruch", 2008, V. 3: П—Я, S. 645. — ISBN 978-966-528-279-2.
- (in Ukrainian) , Шляхтинці // Ternopil Oblast. History of cities and villages: in 3 v. / Ternopil: "Terno-graph", 2014, V. 3: М—Ш, 608 s. — ISBN 978-966-457-246-7.
