= Saint Mary Church, Sydoriv =

Church in Sydoriv, Ukraine

Saint Mary Church
- Костел Непорочного Зачаття Пречистої Діви Марії
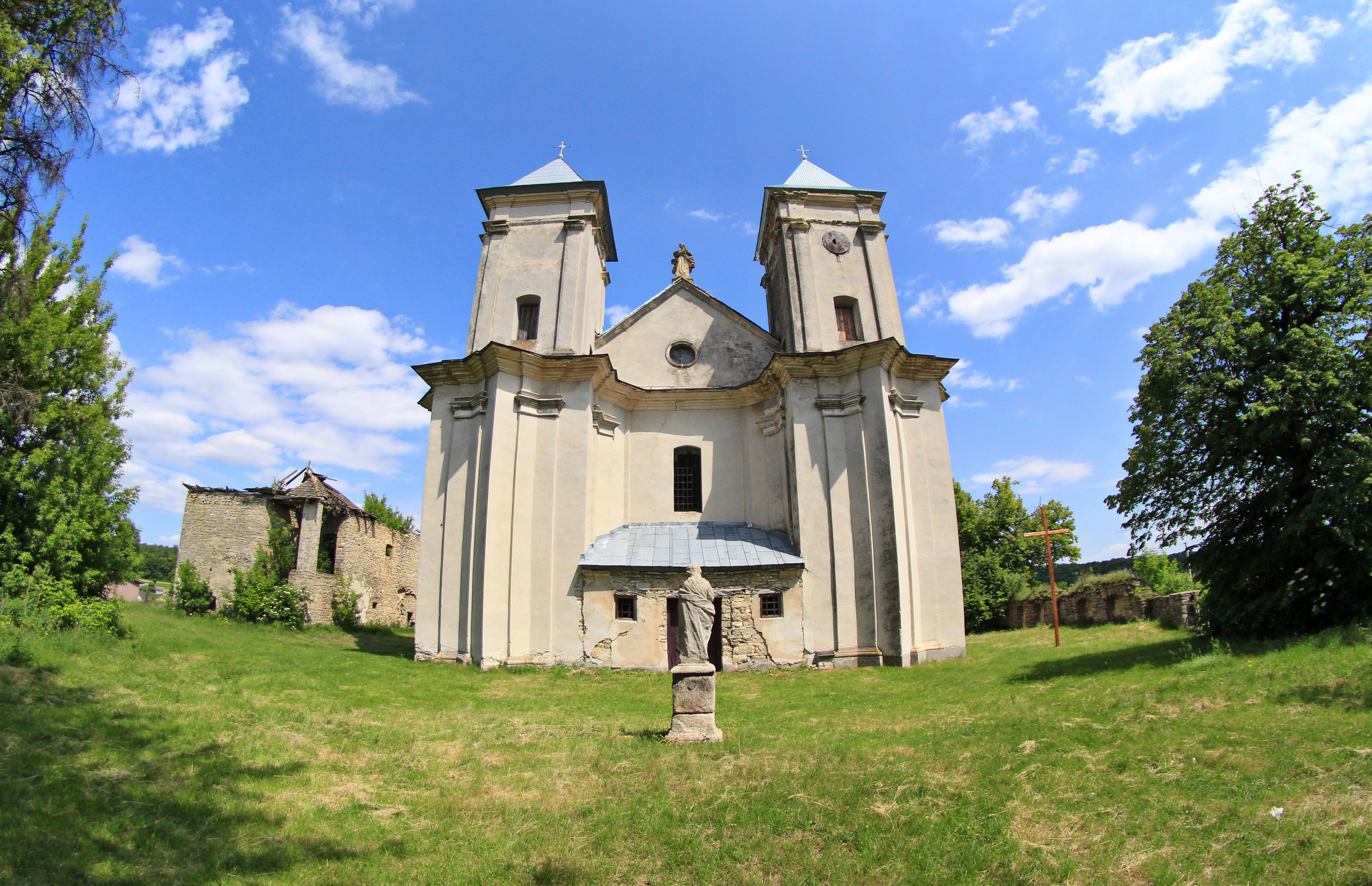

- Location within Ternopil Oblast

Location
- Location: Sydoriv
- Coordinates: 49°00′38″N 26°10′17″E

Architecture
- Completed: 1731

Immovable Monument of National Significance of Ukraine
- Official name: Костел (мур.) (Church (stone))
- Type: Architecture
- Reference no.: 190103

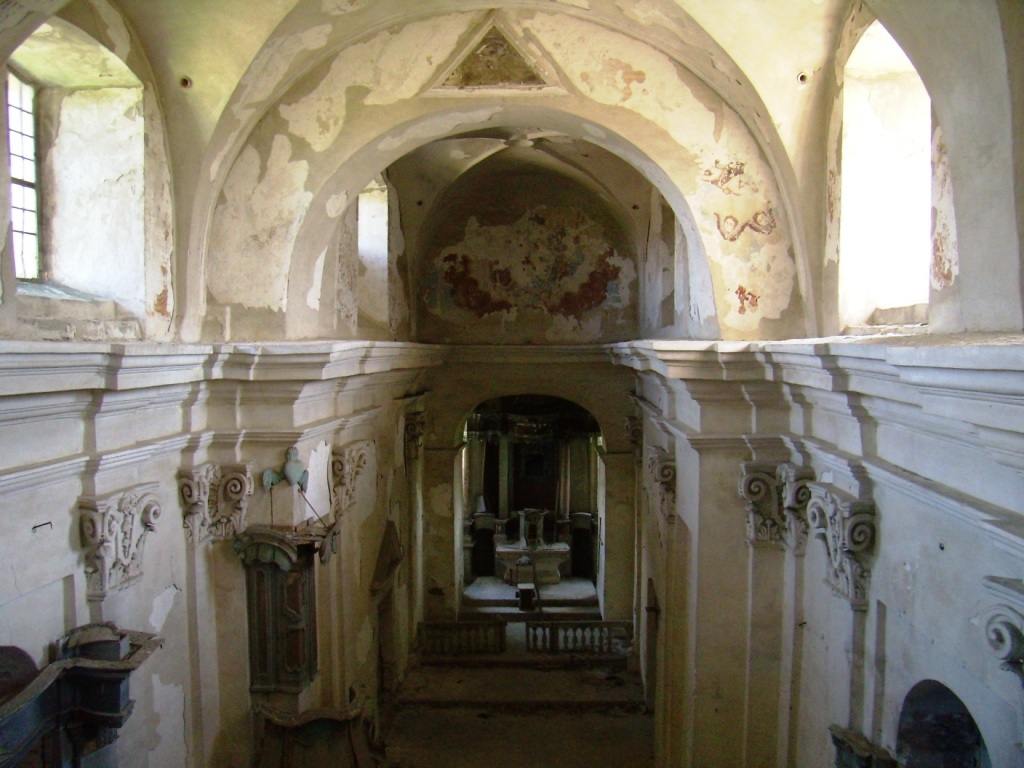
Interior

Saint Mary Church (Ukrainian: Костел Непорочного Зачаття Пречистої Діви Марії) is a Roman Catholic church in Sydoriv, Ternopil Oblast. It is an architectural monument of national significance.

== History ==
It was built in 1730–1741 with funding from Marcin Kalinowski. The design is credited to architect Jan de Witte, who was the commander of the fortress in Kamianets-Podilskyi. After World War II, the church was closed. In the early 1990s, it was returned to the faithful and underwent preliminary repairs. Under the church, there is a spacious vaulted crypt where members of the Kalinowski family were buried.

Next to the church stands a fragment of an ancient monastery building. The part that was connected to the church was dismantled in the 19th and early 20th centuries. It is a one-story structure on a high foundation, covered with a hipped roof with an eave on the side of the church. Part of the church wall has also been preserved, and there is a low four-sided chapel nearby.

== Architecture ==
The uniqueness of the building lies in its architectural plan, which has the shape of an arrow — a direct reference to the Kalinowa coat of arms. The presbytery (altar area) corresponds to the tip of the arrow with a pointed apse and two sacristies that were added later. The nave is the shaft of the arrow, while the facade corresponds to the forked tip, crowned in the coat of arms with two stars symbolizing two towers. The facade is strongly protruding and has a characteristic semicircular-concave shape, with lower tiers on a star plan and quadrangular upper tiers. The exterior decor is represented by flat and wide beams.

== Interior and relics ==
The interior has preserved its Rococo architectural decoration. The vault is box-shaped with lunettes. The main altar, pulpit, and several wooden sculptures have been preserved from the original furnishings.

The famous 18th-century image of Our Lady of the Rosary, which was located in the Sidoriv shrine, was taken to Poland in 1945. There it was placed in the church in Warta Bolesławiecka. A copy of this image was transferred to Sydoriv by former parishioners in 1994.

== Priests ==
- Paweł Fieszkowski
- Antoni Pestendorfer
- Wincenty Mikiska
- Feliks Dorożewski
- Romuald Winkler
- Ferdynand Basarabowicz
- Bronisław Wałowski
- Leon Ornatowski
- Antoni Lemparty
- Kazimierz Orkusz
- Wiktor Malawski

== Bibliography ==
- "Sidorów". Geographical Dictionary of the Kingdom of Poland (in Polish). 10. Warszawa: Kasa im. Józefa Mianowskiego. 1889. p. 480.
