= Zarubyntsi, Skalat urban hromada, Ternopil Raion, Ternopil Oblast =

Rural locality in Ternopil Oblast, Ukraine

Zarubyntsi Зарубинці
- Location in Ternopil Oblast
- Coordinates: 49°23′18″N 25°58′53″E
- Country: Ukraine
- Oblast: Ternopil Oblast
- Raion: Ternopil Raion
- Hromada: Skalat urban hromada
- Time zone: UTC+2 (EET)
  - Summer (DST): UTC+3 (EEST)
- Postal code: 47851

Zarubyntsi (Ukrainian: Зарубинці) is a village in Skalat urban hromada, Ternopil Raion, Ternopil Oblast, Ukraine.

== History ==
The first written mention of the village was in 1649.

After the liquidation of the Pidvolochysk Raion on 19 July 2020, the village became part of the Ternopil Raion.

== Religion ==
- Exaltation of the Holy Cross Church (1932, brick, UGCC).

== Sources ==
- (in Ukrainian) Бойчук О., Вич О., Зарубинці // Ternopil Encyclopedic Dictionary: in 4 v. / editorial board: H. Yavorskyi and other, Ternopil: "Zbruch", 2004, V. 1: А—Й, S. 624. — ISBN 966-528-197-6.
- "Zarubińce 1.) wś, pow. skałacki". Geographical Dictionary of the Kingdom of Poland (in Polish). 14. Warszawa: Kasa im. Józefa Mianowskiego. 1895. p. 424.
