= Husiatyn settlement hromada =

Hromada in Ternopil Oblast, Ukraine

Husiatyn settlement hromada Гусятин селищна громада
- hromada
- Seal

- Location within Ternopil Oblast Location within Ukraine
- Coordinates: 49°04′14″N 26°11′37″E
- Country: Ukraine
- Oblast: Ternopil Oblast
- Raion: Chortkiv Raion
- Administrative center: Husiatyn

Government
  - Hromada head: Stepan Karpo

Area
  - Total: 248.2 km^{2} (95.8 sq mi)

Population (2022)
  - Total: 15,413
- Urban-type settlement: 1
- Villages: 16
- Website: www.hsr.gov.ua

Husiatyn settlement hromada (Ukrainian: Гусятинська селищна територіальна громада, romanized: Husiatynska selyshchna terytorialna hromada is a hromada in Ukraine, in Chortkiv Raion of Ternopil Oblast. The administrative center is the urban-type settlement of Husiatyn. Its population is 15,413 (2022 estimate)

== History ==
It was formed on 15 July 2015 by merging the Husiatyn settlement council and Vilkhivchyk and Sukhodil rural councils of Husiatyn Raion.

== Settlements ==
The hromada consists of 1 urban-type settlement (Husiatyn) and 16 villages:

- Bodnarivka
- Bosyry
- Vasylkiv
- Vilkhivchyk
- Horodnytsia
- Zelena
- Kotsiubynchyky
- Kryvenke
- Lychkivtsi
- Postolivka
- Samoluskivtsi
- Sydoriv
- Sokyryntsi
- Sukhodil
- Trybukhivtsi
- Shydlivtsi
