= Kotsiubynchyky =

Village in Ternopil Oblast, Ukraine

Kotsiubynchyky Коцюбинчики
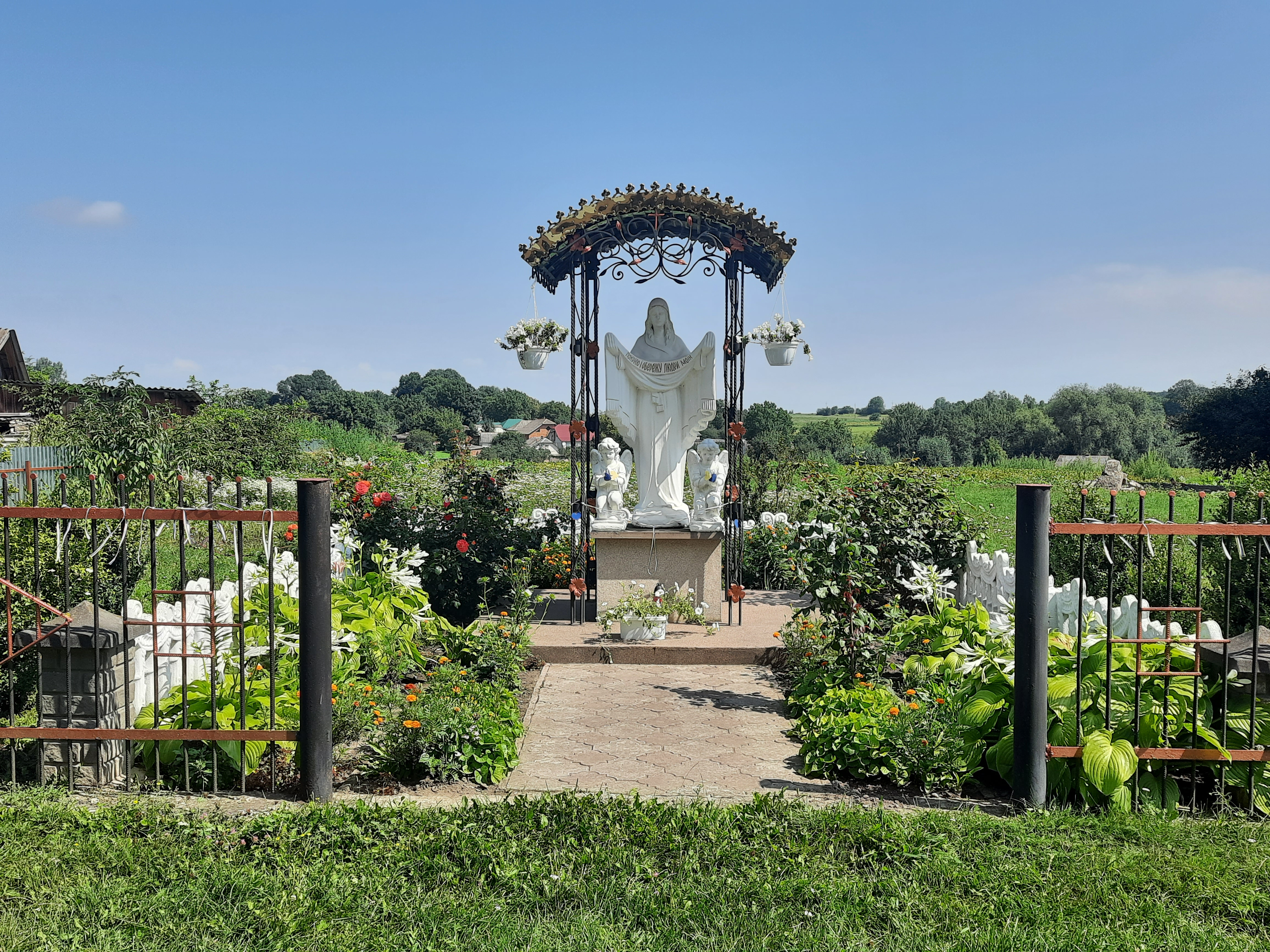

- Location in Ternopil Oblast
- Coordinates: 48°57′29″N 26°9′33″E
- Country: Ukraine
- Oblast: Ternopil Oblast
- Raion: Chortkiv Raion
- Hromada: Husiatyn Hromada
- Postal code: 48526

Kotsiubynchyky (Ukrainian: Коцюбинчики) is a village in Husiatyn settlement hromada, Chortkiv Raion, Ternopil Oblast, Ukraine.

== History ==
Known since the XVI century.

== Religion ==
- Saint Nicholas Church (UGCC, 1992–1995, stone; the old wooden church burned down in 1994)

== Sources ==
- "Kociubińczyki". Geographical Dictionary of the Kingdom of Poland (in Polish). 4. Warszawa: Kasa im. Józefa Mianowskiego. 1883. p. 232.
