= Sukhodil, Ternopil Oblast =

Village in Ternopil Oblast, Ukraine

Sukhodil Суходіл
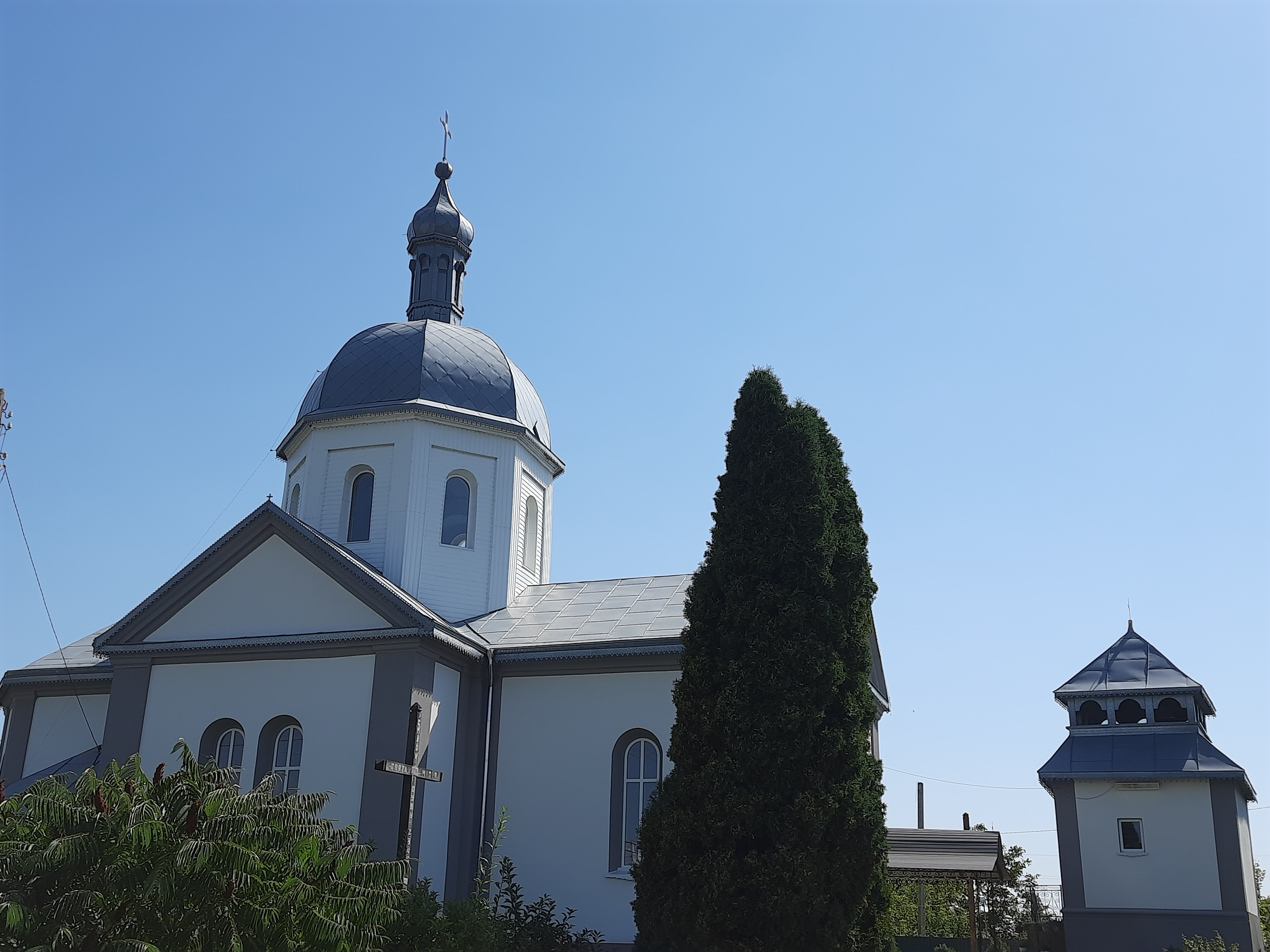
- Church of St. Dmitry in Sukhodil

- Location in Ternopil Oblast
- Coordinates: 49°2′35″N 26°10′23″E
- Country: Ukraine
- Oblast: Ternopil Oblast
- Raion: Chortkiv Raion
- Hromada: Husiatyn Hromada
- Postal code: 48205

Sukhodil (Ukrainian: Суходіл) is a village in Husiatyn settlement hromada, Chortkiv Raion, Ternopil Oblast, Ukraine.

== History ==
The first written mention is from 1532.

== Religion ==
- Saint Demetrius Church (1909, brick)

== Sources ==
- "Suchodół 5.) wś, powiat husiatyński". Geographical Dictionary of the Kingdom of Poland (in Polish). 11. Warszawa: Kasa im. Józefa Mianowskiego. 1890. p. 536.
