= Mahdalivka =

Rural locality in Ternopil Oblast, Ukraine

Mahdalivka Магдалівка
- Location in Ternopil Oblast
- Coordinates: 49°25′59″N 25°49′35″E
- Country: Ukraine
- Oblast: Ternopil Oblast
- Raion: Ternopil Raion
- Hromada: Skalat urban hromada
- Time zone: UTC+2 (EET)
  - Summer (DST): UTC+3 (EEST)
- Postal code: 47850

Mahdalivka (Ukrainian: Магдалівка) is a village in Skalat urban hromada, Ternopil Raion, Ternopil Oblast, Ukraine.

== History ==
The first written mention of the village was in 1785.

After the liquidation of the Pidvolochysk Raion on 19 July 2020, the village became part of the Ternopil Raion.

== Religion ==
- St. Luke church (1937, rebuilt in 1946),
- Church of the Ascension (1903, rebuilt in 1925; rebuilt from a Roman Catholic church in the late 1990s, consecrated in 2005).

== Sources ==
- (in Ukrainian) Уніят В., Магдалівка // Ternopil Encyclopedic Dictionary: in 4 v. / editorial board: H. Yavorskyi and other, Ternopil: "Zbruch", 2005, V. 2: К—О, S. 423. — ISBN 966-528-199-2.
- "Magdalówka". Geographical Dictionary of the Kingdom of Poland (in Polish). 5. Warszawa: Kasa im. Józefa Mianowskiego. 1884. p. 894.
