= Osyp Shpytko =

Ukrainian writer (1869 - 1942)

Osyp Stepanovych Shpytkó
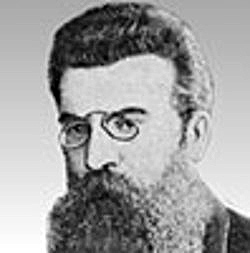
- Osyp Shpytko
- Born: April 7, 1869; Horodnytsia, Austria-Hungary
- Died: March 25, 1942 (aged 72); Curitiba, Brazil
- Occupations: Writer, Publicist

Osyp Stepanovych Shpytkó (April 7, 1869 – 1942) was a Ukrainian and Brazilian writer and publicist. He was born in the village of Horodnytsia, now in Chortkiv Raion, Ternopil Oblast, Ukraine and died in Rio de Janeiro, Brazil.

== Biography ==
He was born on April 7, 1869, in the village of Horodnytsia (now in Husyatynsky district; according to other information, in the town of Hovylovi, Kopychynetsky district, now a village in Terebovlyansky district, both settlements are now within Ternopil, Ukraine).

He graduated from a normal school in Hovylov Veliky, Husiatyn district. He studied at the teachers' seminary in Ternopil. He changed professions many times, sometimes earning a living by playing billiards or cards. For three years he worked as an actor in provincial theaters in Galicia, first in small towns, and later in Lviv. He began to write poems in Polish for "Monitor" magazine. He also wrote music for his own Polish and Ukrainian texts & conducted choirs. In 1899, he became an employee of the newspaper "Dilo" and edited "Bukovyna" in Chernivtsi.

Under the pseudonym Hryts Shchypavka, he published several satirical and humorous books, including Infernal letters (Antichrist to Lucifer), New-fashioned psalmist, and Chruniad. In 1901, he published the autobiographical novel "The Specter" in the Literary and Scientific Bulletin, which was republished in 2000.

Shpytko belonged to the "Young Muse" literary group in 1906 & 1907. Among his other works are lyrical poems, the novella "Through Her", and the short story "Ivan Pidkova".

In 1912 or 1913, Shpytko immigrated to Brazil, where he also wrote in Portuguese: "Otherworldly Poems", "The Story of a Freak", "The Macabre Dance of Death" and his most famous book of this period - the collection of short stories "No túmulo da vida" ("On the grave of life", 1930).

Who among those who remember the "good" pre-war times, does not remember Hryts Shchypavka (Osyp Shpytka) - this... famous friend of fun, whose wit - burlesque and vulgar, but brilliant - made people laugh their heads off? Who did not tremble before his tongue, and even more before his fists? Who, reading his autobiographical novel "Freak", which was a precursor to the stories of Jack London or Locke, as a young person, does not recall even now this trembling of the soul, which this idealized anarchist of life in the novel awakened in him, giving birth to envy, and at the same time surprise for the hero that exposed himself so unapologetically to the reader? Who still today does not laugh to himself when he accidentally remembers one of the classic carols parodied by Hryts Shchypavka, or a parody of Shevchenko that began with the words: "The lousy rascal around the house..."? Or those immortal vulgar "Letters from Hell" ...

— Petro Karmanskyi

He died in 1942 in Rio de Janeiro, Brazil.

== Bibliography ==
=== Author ===
- autobiographical work "Freak" (1930)

=== Satirical and humorous collections ===
- "Infernal Letters of the Antichrist to Lucifer"
- "New-fashioned songstress"
- "Khruniada"

=== Collections of stories ===
- "No tumulo da vida" ("In the grave of life", 1930).
