= Bodnarivka, Ternopil Oblast =

Rural locality in Ternopil Oblast, Ukraine

Bodnarivka Боднарівка
- Location in Ternopil Oblast
- Coordinates: 49°1′53″N 26°11′30″E
- Country: Ukraine
- Oblast: Ternopil Oblast
- Raion: Chortkiv Raion
- Hromada: Husiatyn settlement hromada
- Time zone: UTC+2 (EET)
  - Summer (DST): UTC+3 (EEST)
- Postal code: 48205

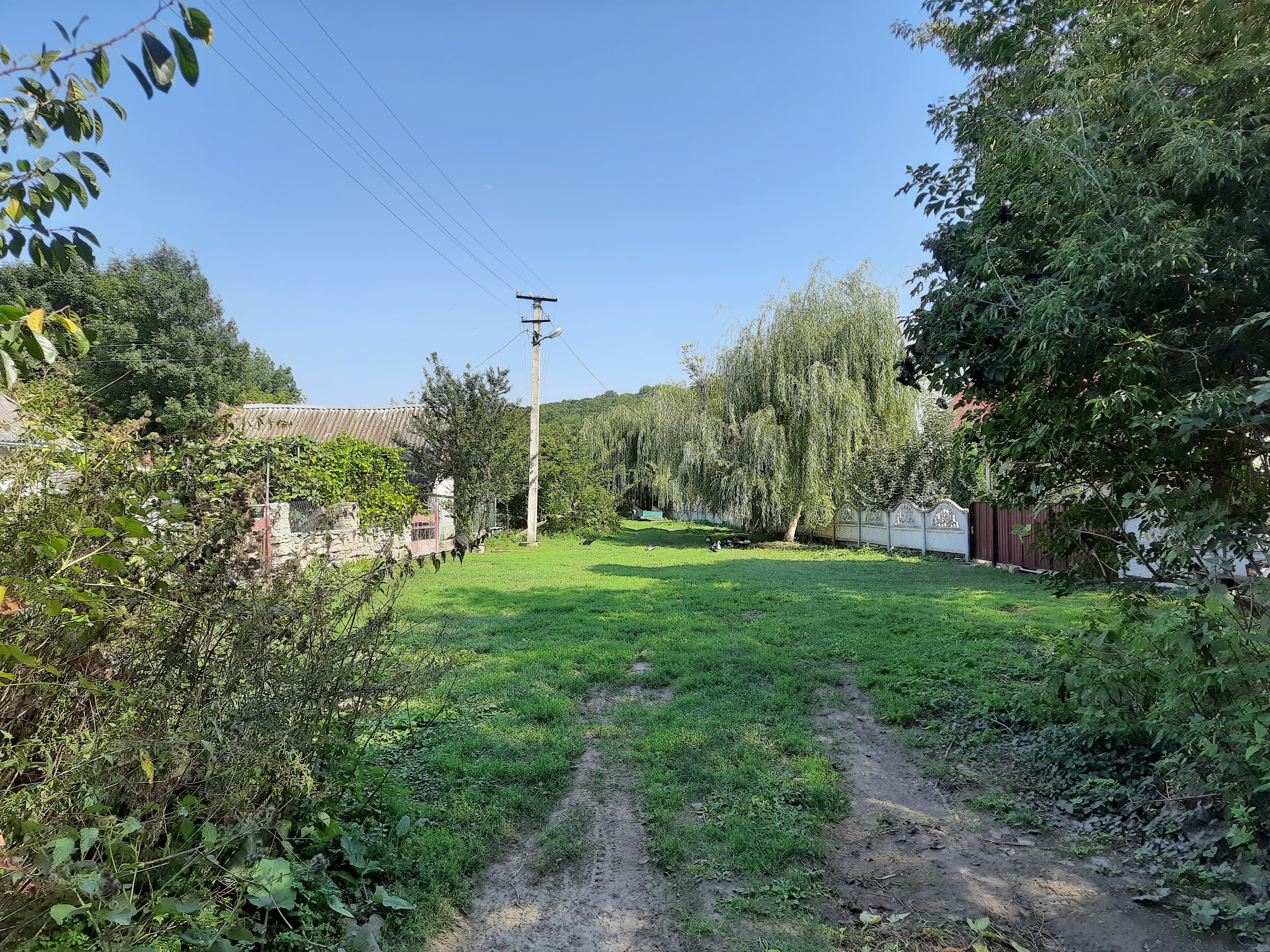
Street in Bodnarivka

Bodnarivka (Ukrainian: Боднарівка) is a village in Husiatyn settlement hromada, Chortkiv Raion, Ternopil Oblast, Ukraine.

== History ==
The first written mention is from 1532.

After the liquidation of the Husiatyn Raion on 19 July 2020, the village became part of the Chortkiv Raion.

== Religion ==
The village has a brick chapel.

== Sources ==
- "Bednarówka z Suchodołem i Trojanówką, pow. husiatyński". Geographical Dictionary of the Kingdom of Poland (in Polish). 1. Warszawa: Kasa im. Józefa Mianowskiego. 1880. p. 124.
- "Bednarówka 2.), gm. Olchowiec". Geographical Dictionary of the Kingdom of Poland (in Polish). 1. Warszawa: Kasa im. Józefa Mianowskiego. 1880. p. 124.
