= Vasylkiv, Ternopil Oblast =

Village in Ternopil Oblast, Ukraine

Vasylkiv Васильків
- Location in Ternopil Oblast
- Coordinates: 48°59′36″N 26°7′48″E
- Country: Ukraine
- Oblast: Ternopil Oblast
- Raion: Chortkiv Raion
- Hromada: Husiatyn Hromada
- Postal code: 48522

Vasylkiv (Ukrainian: Васильків) is a village in Husiatyn settlement hromada, Chortkiv Raion, Ternopil Oblast, Ukraine.

== History ==
It was founded in 1710.

== Religion ==
- Church of the Assumption (1995, UGCC)

== Sources ==
- "Wasylków (pow. husiatyński)". Geographical Dictionary of the Kingdom of Poland (in Polish). 13. Warszawa: Kasa im. Józefa Mianowskiego. 1893. p. 141.
