= Eugenie Schwarzwald =

Austrian philanthropist, writer and pedagogue

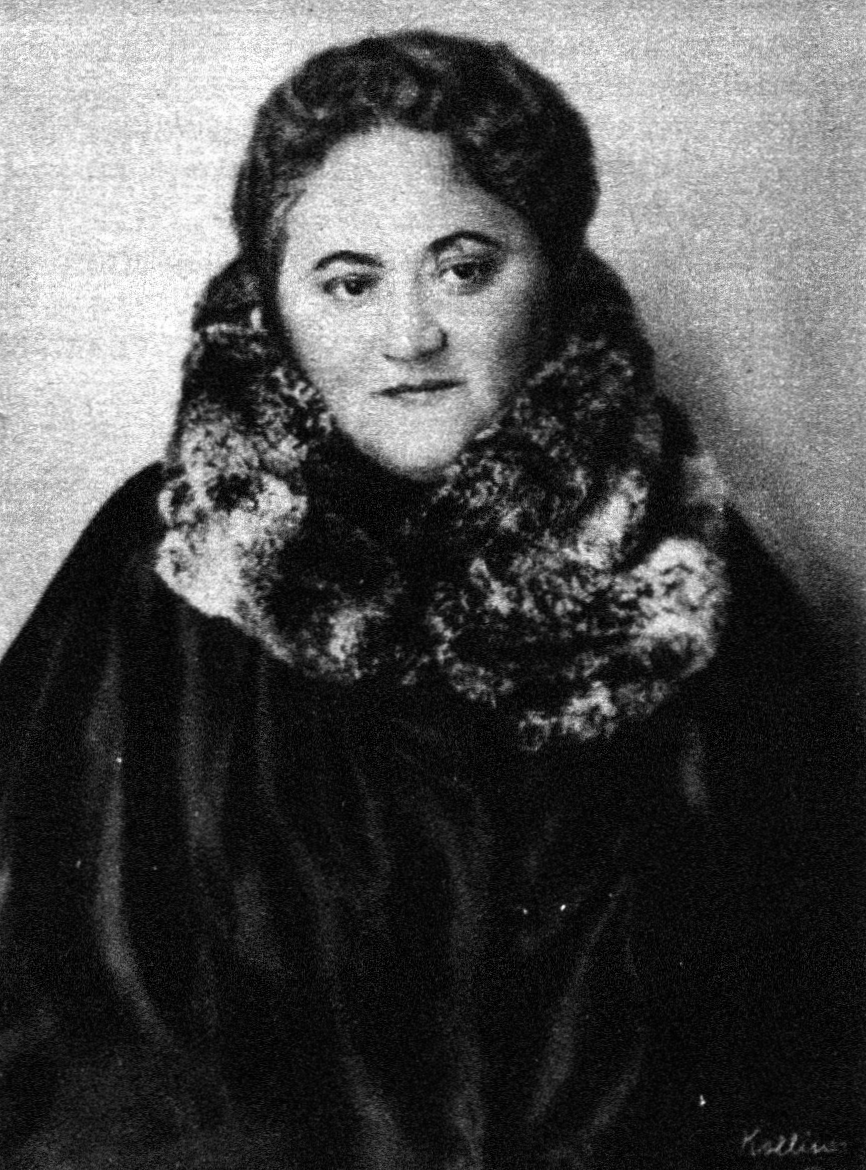
- Eugenie Schwarzwald circa 1920
- Born: Eugenie Nußbaum; July 4, 1872; Polupanivka, Austria-Hungary
- Died: August 7, 1940 (aged 68); Zurich, Switzerland
- Education: University of Zurich

Eugenie Schwarzwald (née Nußbaum; 4 July 1872 – 7 August 1940) was a progressive Polish philanthropist, writer and pedagogue, who founded the innovative Schwarzwald school and developed education for girls in Austria and was one of the most learned women of her time.

== Early life ==
Eugenie Nußbaum was born in Polupanivka, a village near the Zbruch River in Austria-Hungary (now Ternopil Raion, Ukraine). She left home in 1895 and studied German and English literature, philosophy and pedagogy at the University of Zurich. She received her doctoral degree in 1900. At that time, women were not allowed to study at Austrian high schools and universities and Eugenie was one of the first academically educated women in Austria-Hungary. In 1900 she married Dr. Hermann Schwarzwald (1871–1939).

== Innovative educator ==
Schwarzwald felt Polish and was known as an innovative educator. In Austria, in 1901 she became head of the Girls' Secondary School and in 1911 of the Girls' College. Her aim was to offer an adequate and motivating secondary education to girls, comparable to that which was accessible to boys. To reach that goal, she engaged many contemporary, prominent artists and scientists to teach the girls. For example, Oskar Kokoschka gave lessons in drawing, Arnold Schoenberg taught music and composition and Adolf Loos lectured on architecture. This school became a prototype of so-called Schwarzwald schools (Schwarzwaldschulen), modern schools for girls. She often spoke on gender equality to men at the Wiener Frauen Club. Among the famous students of the Schwarzwald schools were the art historian Emmy Wellesz and the ethnologist Marianne Schmidl, who would become the first woman to receive a doctorate in ethnology from the University of Vienna. During World War I, she devoted herself to caring for ill and elderly people as well as deprived children. She wrote newspaper articles, feuilletons and short essays.

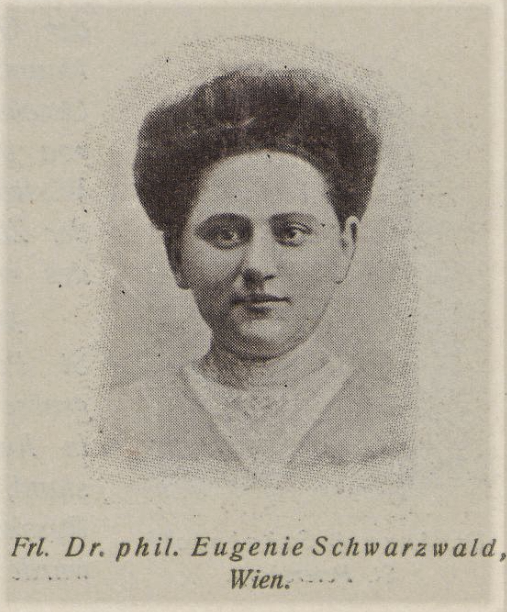
Eugenie Schwarzwald (around 1904)

"Genia" Schwarzwald played an important part in Viennese cultural life and social events. Like many of her contemporaries, she organised a literary salon where she invited Kokoschka, Loos or Schoenberg as well as the novelists Elias Canetti and Robert Musil. She and Isadora Duncan inspired the character Ermelinda Tuzzi, "Diotima", in Musil's novel The Man Without Qualities.

== Anschluss and Holocaust ==
In 1938, Schwarzwald was forced to leave Austria due to her Jewish ancestry and emigrated to Switzerland. Her assets were seized by Nazis, the Schwarzwald schools were closed, and many of her students, who were Jewish women, were murdered in the Holocaust. She died in Zurich on 7 August 1940.

== See also ==
- Female education
- Aryanization
- Anschluss
- The Holocaust in Austria
