= Bosyry =

Village in Ternopil Oblast, Ukraine

Bosyry Босири
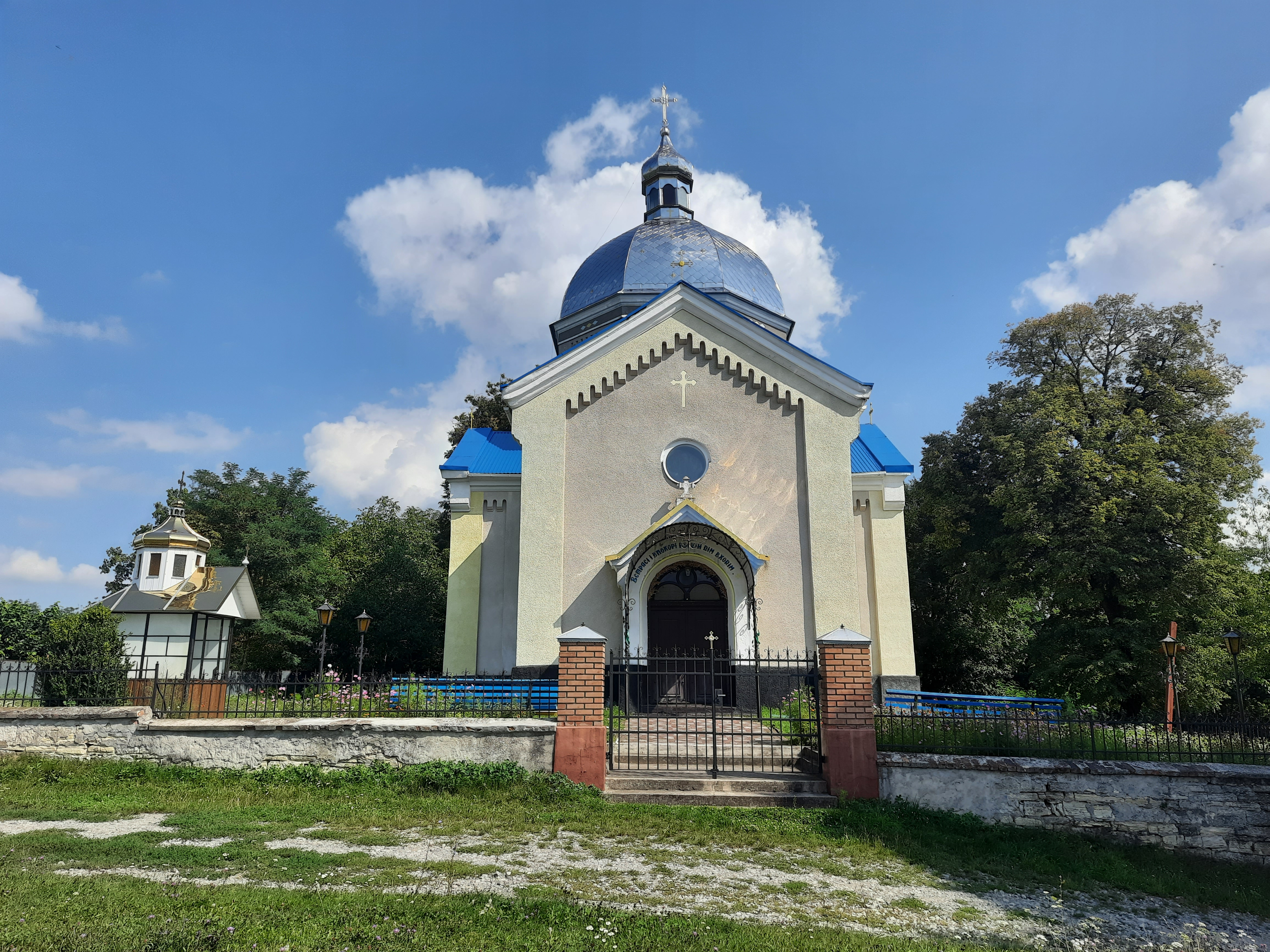
- Church of the Intercession

- Location in Ternopil Oblast
- Coordinates: 48°55′52″N 26°10′15″E
- Country: Ukraine
- Oblast: Ternopil Oblast
- Raion: Chortkiv Raion
- Hromada: Husiatyn Hromada
- Postal code: 48526

Bosyry (Ukrainian: Босири) is a village in Husiatyn settlement hromada, Chortkiv Raion, Ternopil Oblast, Ukraine.

== History ==
The first written mention dates from 1785.

== Religion ==
- Church of the Intercession (UGCC, 1906, brick, damaged during the war, restored in 1922)
