= Zelena, Husiatyn settlement hromada, Chortkiv Raion, Ternopil Oblast =

Village in Ternopil Oblast, Ukraine

Zelena Зелена
- Location in Ternopil Oblast
- Coordinates: 49°10′55″N 26°6′36″E
- Country: Ukraine
- Oblast: Ternopil Oblast
- Raion: Chortkiv Raion
- Hromada: Husiatyn Hromada
- Postal code: 48237

Zelena (Ukrainian: Зелена) is a village in Husiatyn settlement hromada, Chortkiv Raion, Ternopil Oblast, Ukraine.

== History ==
The first written mention dates from 1648.

== Religion ==
- Saint John the Baptist Church (UGCC, 1725, wooden, purchased by the community from the town of Skala-Podilska)
