= Novosilka, Skalat urban hromada, Ternopil Raion, Ternopil Oblast =

Rural locality in Ternopil Oblast, Ukraine

Novosilka Новосілка
- Location in Ternopil Oblast Novosilka (Ukraine)
- Coordinates: 49°26′43″N 26°0′1″E
- Country: Ukraine
- Oblast: Ternopil Oblast
- Raion: Ternopil Raion
- Hromada: Skalat urban hromada
- Time zone: UTC+2 (EET)
  - Summer (DST): UTC+3 (EEST)
- Postal code: 47851

Novosilka (Ukrainian: Новосілка) is a village in Skalat urban hromada, Ternopil Raion, Ternopil Oblast, Ukraine.

== History ==
The first written mention of the village was in 1471.

After the liquidation of the Pidvolochysk Raion on 19 July 2020, the village became part of the Ternopil Raion.

== Religion ==
- Saint Josaphat's church (1935, brick, rebuilt in 1993),
- Roman Catholic Church of Our Lady of Ostrobramska (1936).

== Sources ==
- Хрущ А. С. Новосілка село Тернопільського району Тернопільської області2 // Encyclopedia of Modern Ukraine [Електронний ресурс] / Редкол. : І. М. Дзюба, А. І. Жуковський, М. Г. Железняк [та ін.]; НАН України, НТШ. — К. : Інститут енциклопедичних досліджень НАН України, 2021.
- (in Ukrainian) Мельничук Б., Уніят В., Новосілка // Ternopil Encyclopedic Dictionary: in 4 v. / editorial board: H. Yavorskyi and other, Ternopil: "Zbruch", 2005, V. 2: К—О, 706 s. — ISBN 966-528-199-2.
