= Samoluskivtsi =

Rural locality in Ternopil Oblast, Ukraine

Samoluskivtsi Самолусківці
- Location in Ternopil Oblast
- Coordinates: 49°9′14″N 26°6′47″E
- Country: Ukraine
- Oblast: Ternopil Oblast
- Raion: Chortkiv Raion
- Hromada: Husiatyn settlement hromada
- Time zone: UTC+2 (EET)
  - Summer (DST): UTC+3 (EEST)
- Postal code: 48251

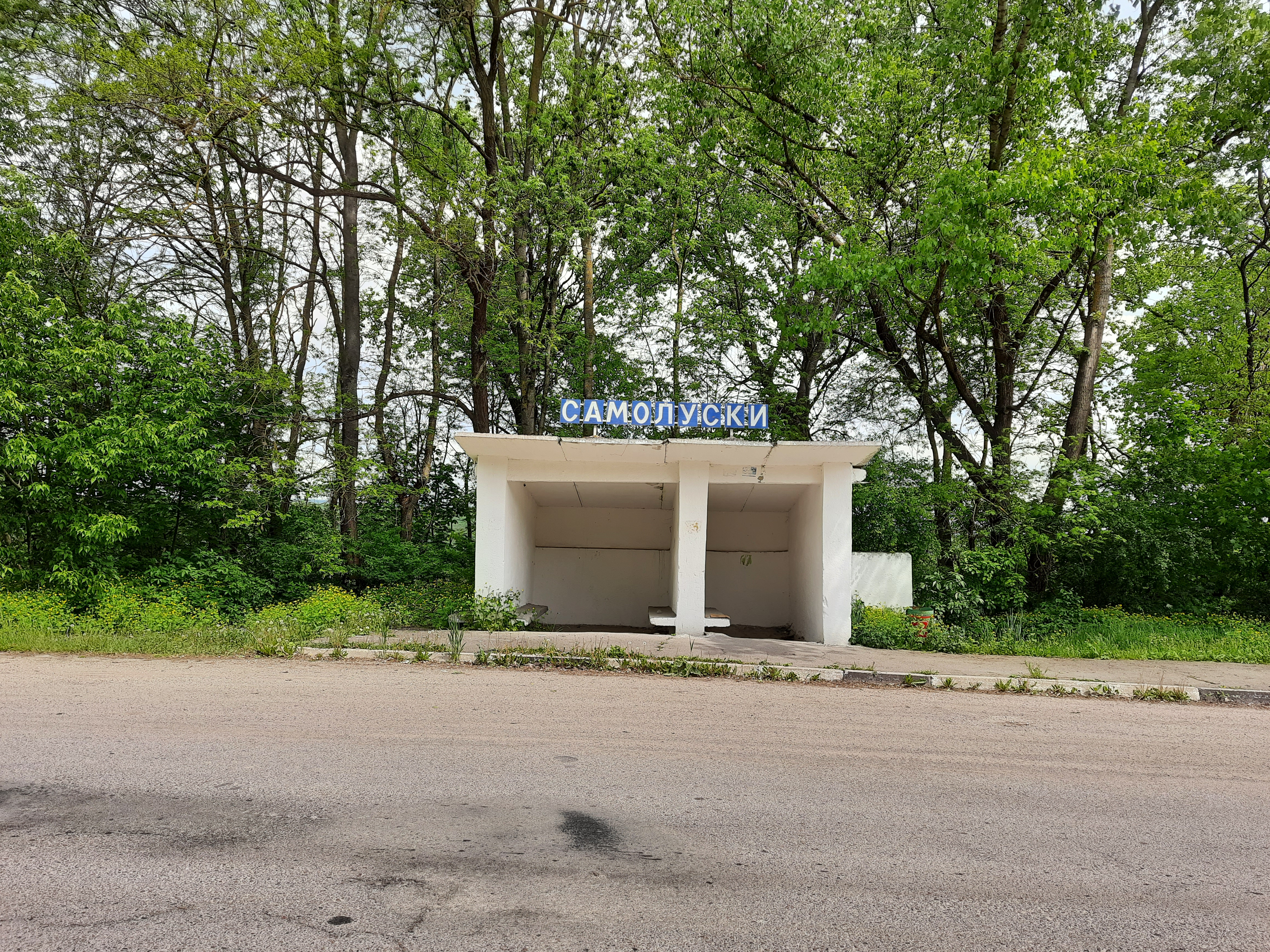
Bus stop near the village of Samoluskivtsi Chortkiv district, Ternopil region

Samoluskivtsi (Ukrainian: Самолусківці) is a village in Husiatyn settlement hromada, Chortkiv Raion, Ternopil Oblast, Ukraine.

== History ==
The first written mention is from 1547.

After the liquidation of the Husiatyn Raion on 19 July 2020, the village became part of the Chortkiv Raion.

== Religion ==
- Saint Demetrius Church (1889),
- Roman Catholic church (19th century).

== Sources ==
- (in Ukrainian) Гуцал П., Уніят В., Самолусківці // Ternopil Encyclopedic Dictionary: in 4 v. / editorial board: H. Yavorskyi and other, Ternopil: "Zbruch", 2008, V. 3: П—Я, S. 225. — ISBN 978-966-528-279-2.
- "Samołuskowce". Geographical Dictionary of the Kingdom of Poland (in Polish). 10. Warszawa: Kasa im. Józefa Mianowskiego. 1889. p. 255.
