= Poplavy, Skalat urban hromada, Ternopil Raion, Ternopil Oblast =

Rural locality in Ternopil Oblast, Ukraine

Poplavy Поплави
- Location in Ternopil Oblast
- Coordinates: 49°26′25″N 25°54′53″E
- Country: Ukraine
- Oblast: Ternopil Oblast
- Raion: Ternopil Raion
- Hromada: Skalat urban hromada
- Time zone: UTC+2 (EET)
  - Summer (DST): UTC+3 (EEST)
- Postal code: 47851

Poplavy (Ukrainian: Поплави) is a village in Skalat urban hromada, Ternopil Raion, Ternopil Oblast, Ukraine.

== History ==
The first written mention of the village was in 1642.

After the liquidation of the Pidvolochysk Raion on 19 July 2020, the village became part of the Ternopil Raion.

== Religion ==
- Chapel (2004).

== Sources ==
- (in Ukrainian) Года Р., Поплави // Ternopil Encyclopedic Dictionary: in 4 v. / editorial board: H. Yavorskyi and other, Ternopil: "Zbruch", 2008, V. 3: П—Я, S. 119. — ISBN 978-966-528-279-2.
- Поплави // Шляхами Золотого Поділля / Наукове товариство імені Шевченка; редкол.: Р. Миколаєвич, П. Гайда, М. Кінасевич та ін. — Філядельфія, 1983. — Т. 3 : Тернопільщина і Скалатщина : Регіональний Історично-Мемуарний Збірник. — S. 528.
