= Kryve, Skalat urban hromada, Ternopil Raion, Ternopil Oblast =

Rural locality in Ternopil Oblast, Ukraine

Kryve Криве
- Location in Ternopil Oblast
- Coordinates: 49°24′50″N 25°58′0″E
- Country: Ukraine
- Oblast: Ternopil Oblast
- Raion: Ternopil Raion
- Hromada: Skalat urban hromada
- Time zone: UTC+2 (EET)
  - Summer (DST): UTC+3 (EEST)
- Postal code: 47872

Kryve (Ukrainian: Криве) is a village in Skalat urban hromada, Ternopil Raion, Ternopil Oblast, Ukraine.

== History ==
The first written mention of the village was in 1754.

After the liquidation of the Pidvolochysk Raion on 19 July 2020, the village became part of the Ternopil Raion.

== Religion ==
- Church of the Nativity of the Blessed Virgin Mary (1863, brick, restored in 1989).

== Sources ==
- (in Ukrainian) Мельничук Б., Шанайда П., Криве // Ternopil Encyclopedic Dictionary: in 4 v. / editorial board: H. Yavorskyi and other, Ternopil: "Zbruch", 2005, V. 2: К—О, S. 233—234. — ISBN 966-528-199-2.
