= Vilkhivchyk, Ternopil Oblast =

Rural locality in Ternopil Oblast, Ukraine

Vilkhivchyk Вільхівчик
- Location in Ternopil Oblast
- Coordinates: 49°5′46″N 26°11′43″E
- Country: Ukraine
- Oblast: Ternopil Oblast
- Raion: Chortkiv Raion
- Hromada: Husiatyn settlement hromada
- Time zone: UTC+2 (EET)
  - Summer (DST): UTC+3 (EEST)
- Postal code: 48254

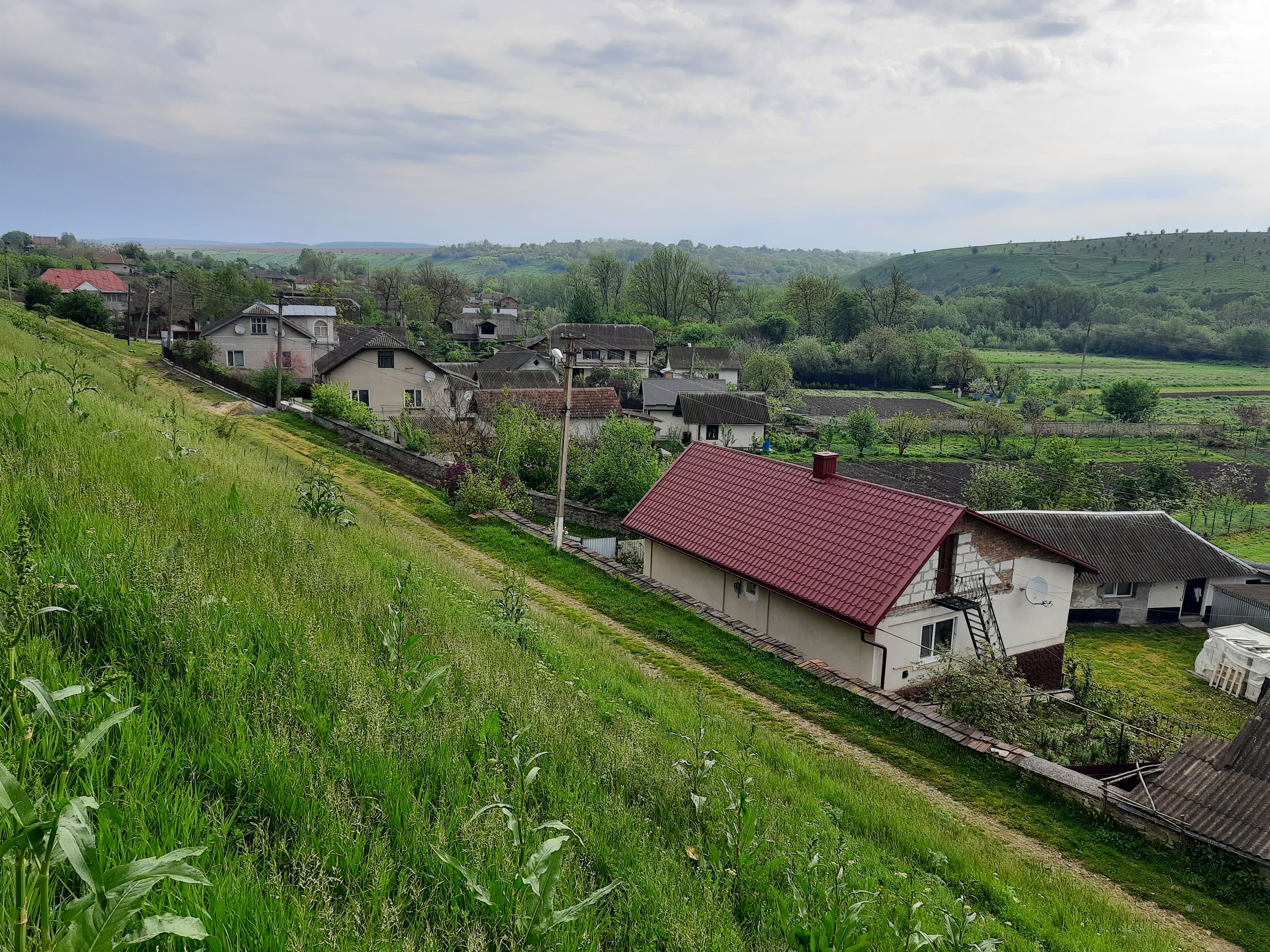
Landscape of the village of Vilkhivchyk Chortkiv district, Ternopil region

Vilkhivchyk (Ukrainian: Вільхівчик) is a village in Husiatyn settlement hromada, Chortkiv Raion, Ternopil Oblast, Ukraine.

== History ==
The first written mention is from 1410.

After the liquidation of the Husiatyn Raion on 19 July 2020, the village became part of the Chortkiv Raion.

== Religion ==
- Church of St. Paraskeva (1929; brick),
- Church of the Sacred Heart of the Lord Jesus (1926; brick).

== Sources ==
- (in Ukrainian) Уніят, В., Вільхівчик // Ternopil Encyclopedic Dictionary: in 4 v. / editorial board: H. Yavorskyi and other, Ternopil: "Zbruch", 2004, V. 1: А—Й, S. 281. — ISBN 966-528-197-6.
- "Olchowczyk, pow. husiatyński". Geographical Dictionary of the Kingdom of Poland (in Polish). 7. Warszawa: Kasa im. Józefa Mianowskiego. 1886. p. 449.
