= Horodnytsia, Chortkiv Raion, Ternopil Oblast =

Village in Ternopil Oblast, Ukraine

Horodnytsia Городниця
- Village
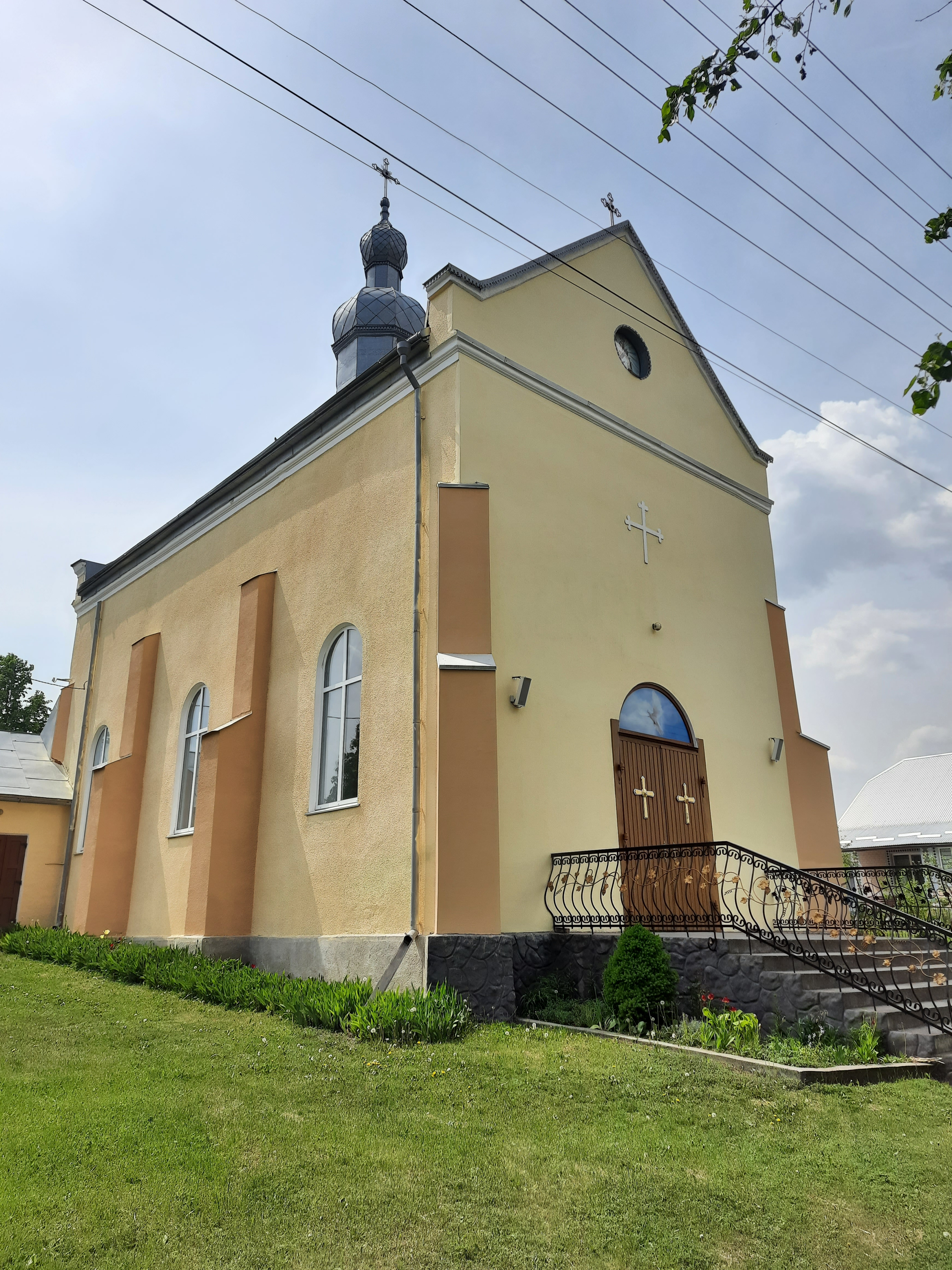
- Church of All Saints

- Location in Ternopil Oblast
- Coordinates: 49°10′55″N 26°6′36″E
- Country: Ukraine
- Oblast: Ternopil Oblast
- Raion: Chortkiv Raion
- Hromada: Husiatyn settlement hromada
- Postal code: 48237

Horodnytsia (Ukrainian: Городниця) is a village in Husiatyn settlement hromada, Chortkiv Raion, Ternopil Oblast, Ukraine.

== History ==
The first written mention of Horodnytsia comes from 1485. In 1848 a stone sculpture, believed to depict Svetovit was discovered in the Zbruch river near a hill in the vicinity of Horodnytsia. Remains of a castle are located on the site of a former fortification on another hill, as well as a burial site of Kyivan Rus period are also located in the vicinity.

During the Soviet period Horodnytsia belonged to Kopychyntsi Raion.

== Religion ==
Churches:

- Holy Trinity (1772, brick)
- All Saints (built as a Roman Catholic church in 1895, restored in 1994 as a Greek Catholic church)
- Transfiguration (1912, restored in 1991)

== Notable residents ==
- Viktor Hurniak (1987–2014), Ukrainian journalist, public figure, participant of the Revolution of Dignity and the Russian-Ukrainian war
- Osyp Shpytko (1869–1942), Ukrainian writer

== See also ==
- Zbruch Idol

== Gallery ==
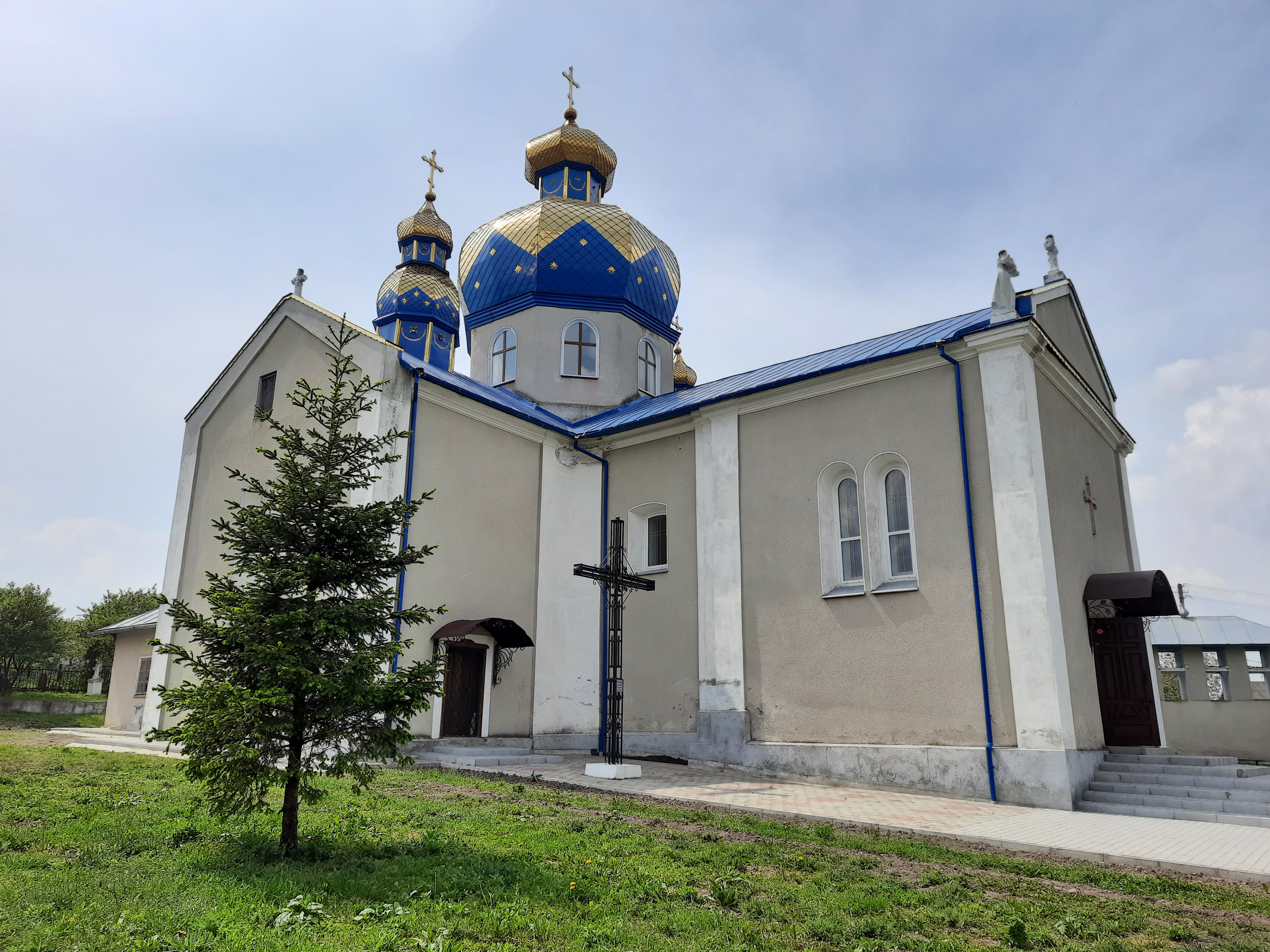
Holy Trinity Church

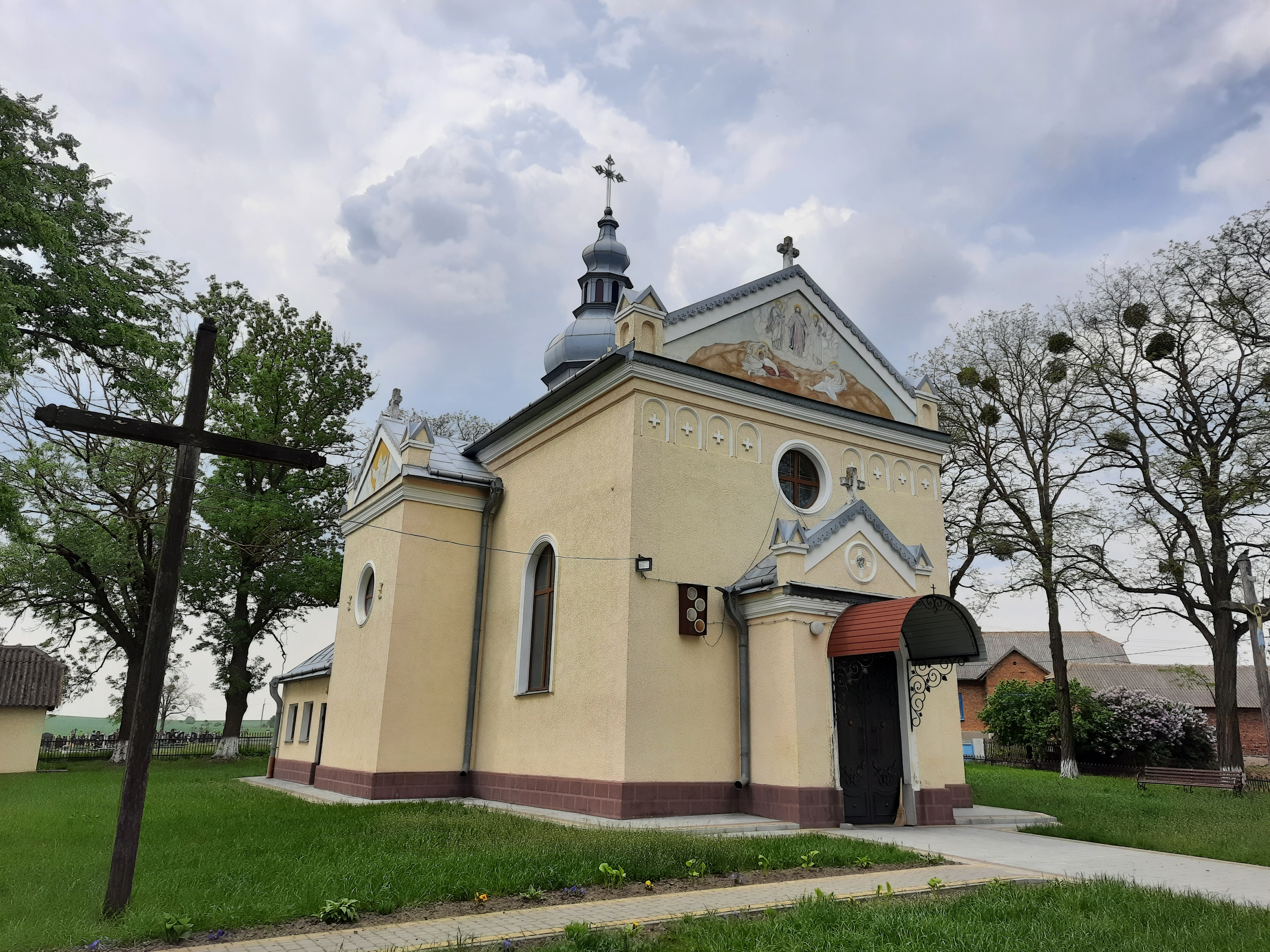
Transfiguration Church

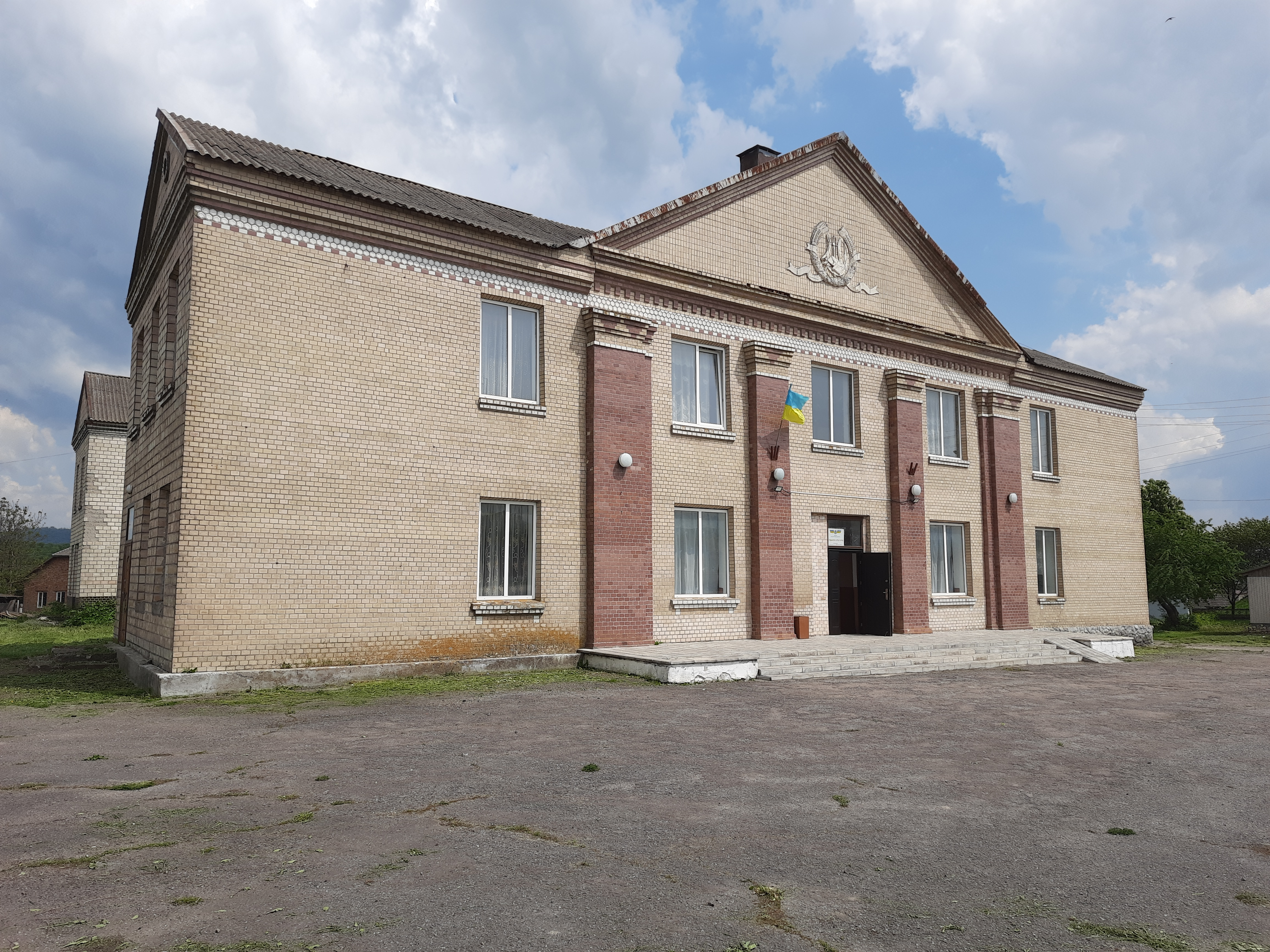
House of Culture

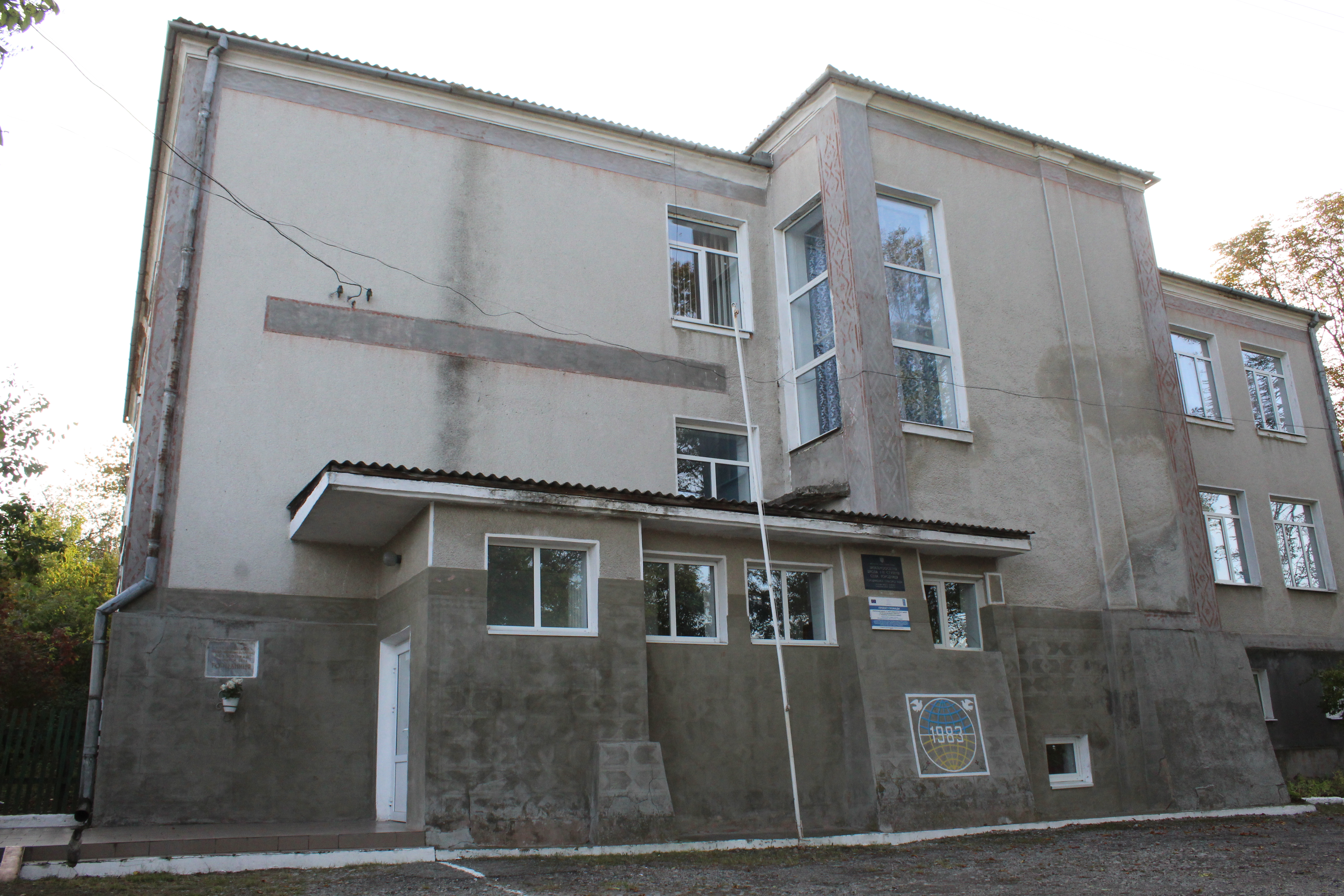
School

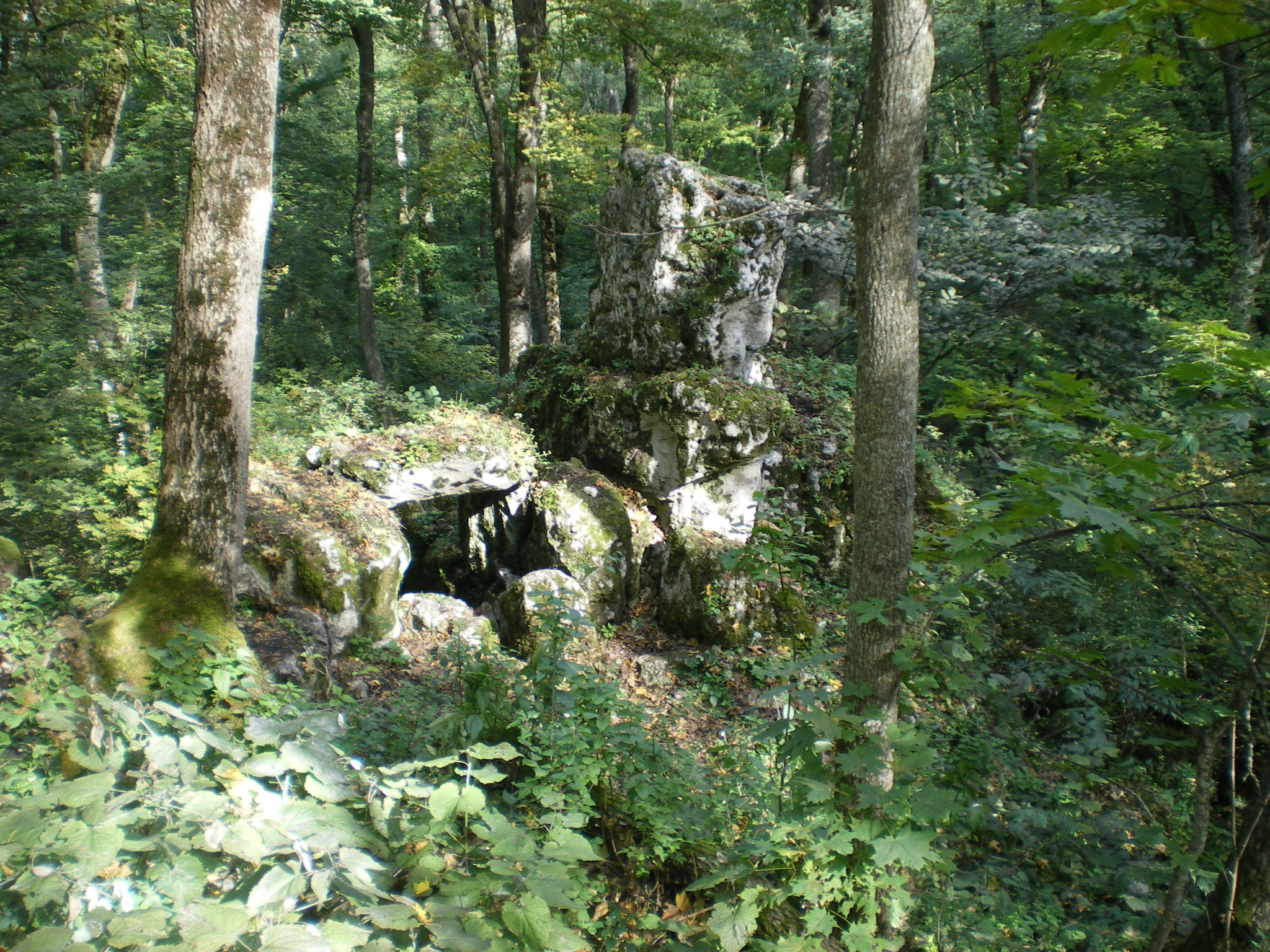
Dolmen

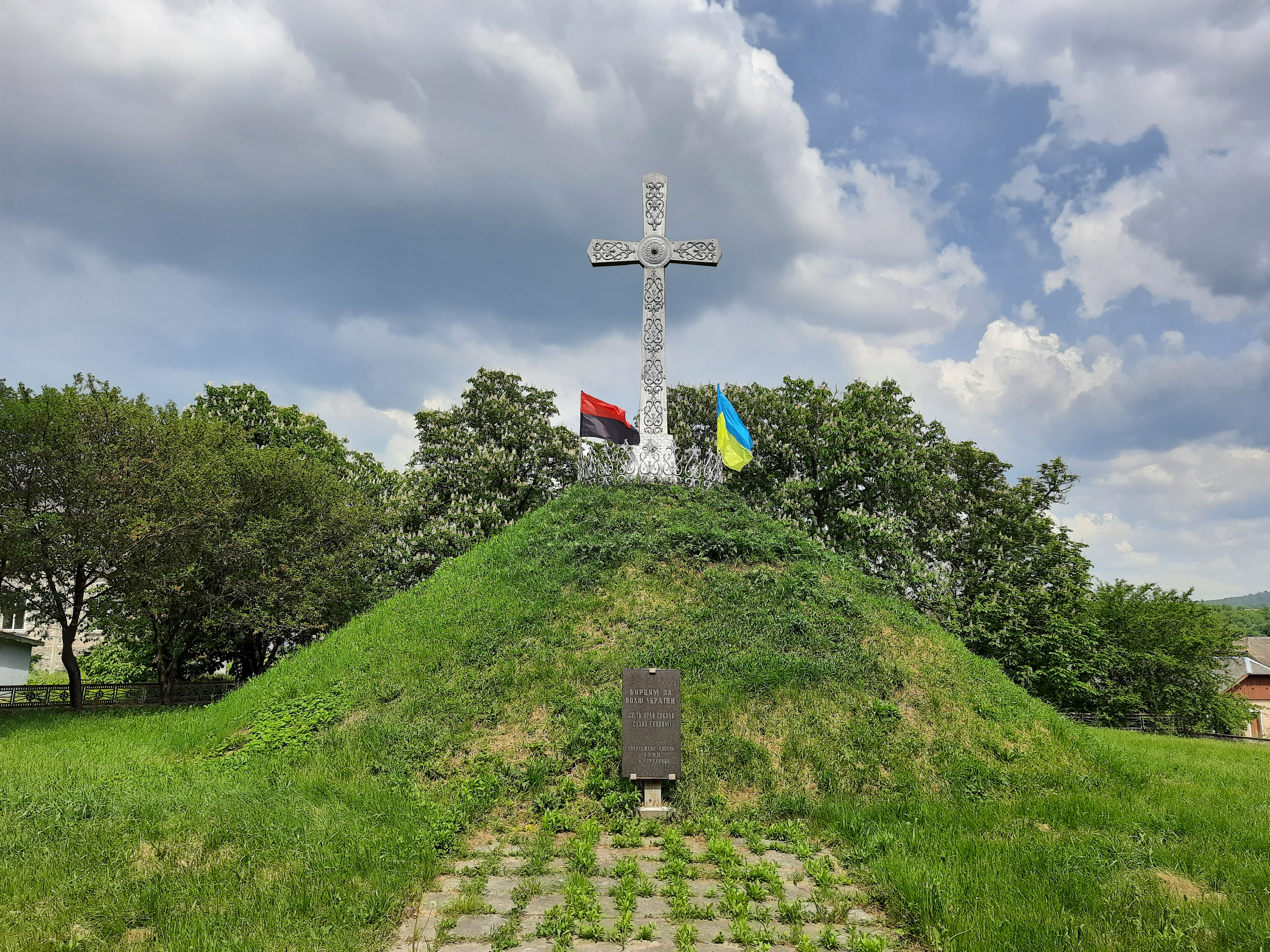
Monument to the Fighters for Freedom of Ukraine
