= Skalat urban hromada =

Urban hromada in Ternopil Oblast, Ukraine

Skalat urban hromada Скалатська міська громада
- hromada
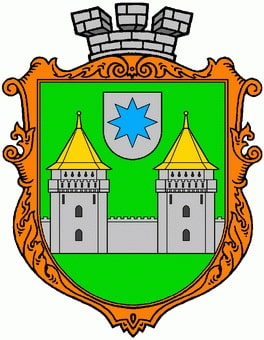
- Seal

- Location within Ternopil Oblast Location within Ukraine
- Coordinates: 49°25′44″N 25°58′28″E
- Country: Ukraine
- Oblast: Ternopil Oblast
- Raion: Ternopil Raion
- Administrative center: Skalat

Government
  - Hromada head: Petro Savonchak

Area
  - Total: 224.2 km^{2} (86.6 sq mi)

Population (2022)
  - Total: 13,143
- City: 1
- Villages: 15
- Website: skalatmr.gov.ua

Skalat urban territorial hromada (Ukrainian: Скалатська територіальна громада, romanized: Skalatska miska terytorialna hromada) is a hromada in Ukraine, in Ternopil Raion of Ternopil Oblast. The administrative center is the city of Skalat. Its population is 13,143 (2022 estimate) . It was established on 14 July 2015.

== Settlements ==
The hromada consists of 1 city (Skalat) and 15 villages:

- Horodnytsia
- Zarubyntsi
- Kolodiivka
- Kryve
- Mahdalivka
- Mytnytsia
- Novosilka
- Ostapie
- Panasivka
- Podillia
- Polupanivka
- Poplavy
- Staryi Skalat
- Teklivka
- Khoptianka
