= Horodnytsia, Ternopil Raion, Ternopil Oblast =

Rural locality in Ternopil Oblast, Ukraine

Horodnytsia Городниця
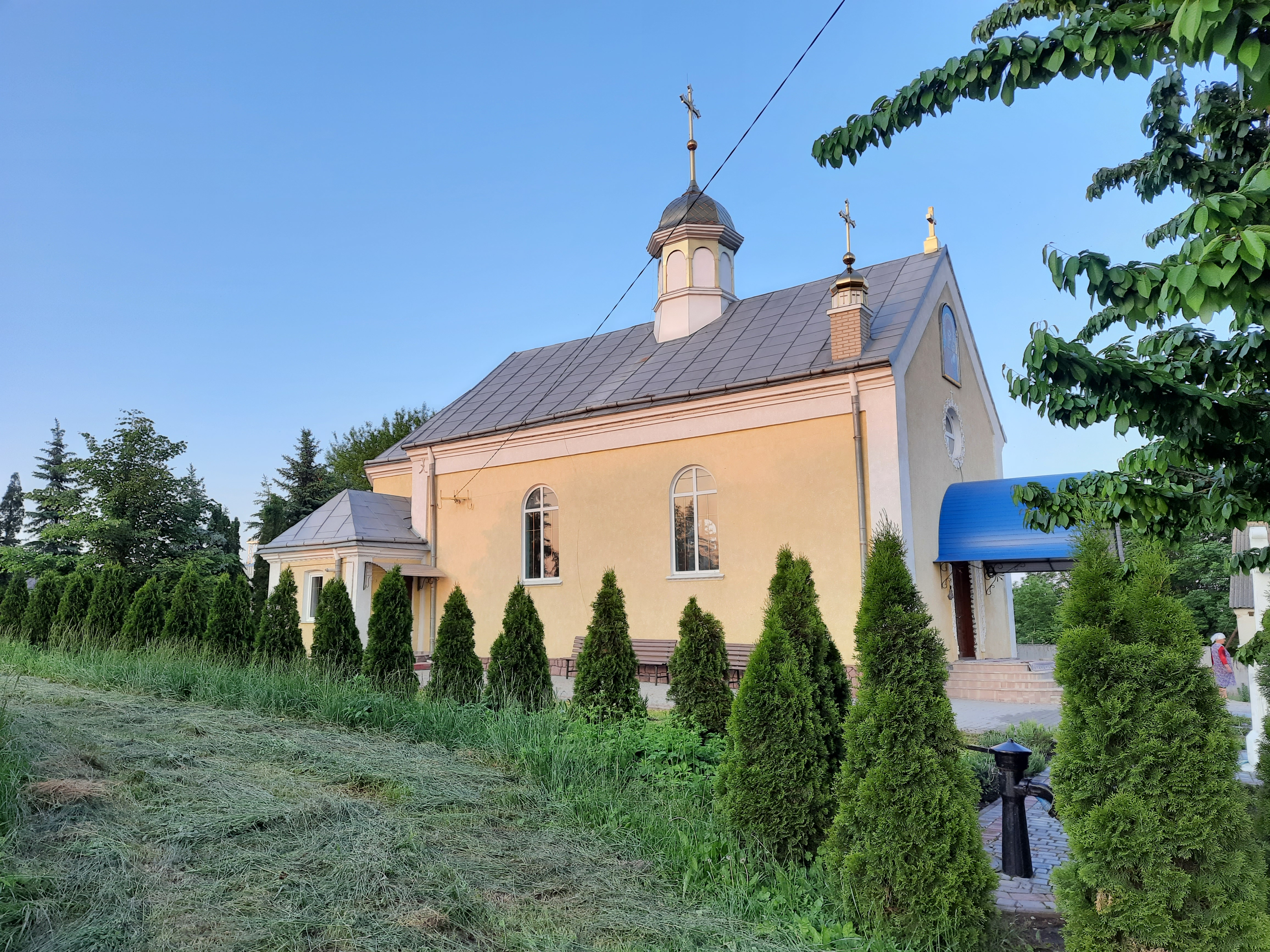
- Church of the Dormition

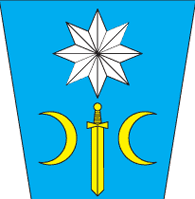
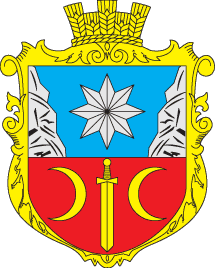
- Flag Coat of arms

- Location in Ternopil Oblast
- Coordinates: 49°24′40″N 26°1′28″E
- Country: Ukraine
- Oblast: Ternopil Oblast
- Raion: Ternopil Raion
- Hromada: Skalat urban hromada
- Time zone: UTC+2 (EET)
  - Summer (DST): UTC+3 (EEST)
- Postal code: 47851

Horodnytsia (Ukrainian: Городниця) is a village in Skalat urban hromada, Ternopil Raion, Ternopil Oblast, Ukraine.

== History ==
The first written mention of the village was in 1559.

After the liquidation of the Pidvolochysk Raion on 19 July 2020, the village became part of the Ternopil Raion.

== Religion ==
- Church of the Dormition (1935).

== Sources ==
- (in Ukrainian) Тихоліз Н., Лашта В., Городниця // Ternopil Encyclopedic Dictionary: in 4 v. / editorial board: H. Yavorskyi and other, Ternopil: "Zbruch", 2004, V. 1: А—Й, S. 402. — ISBN 966-528-197-6.
- "Horodnica (2)". Geographical Dictionary of the Kingdom of Poland (in Polish). 3. Warszawa: Kasa im. Józefa Mianowskiego. 1882. p. 140.
