= Trybukhivtsi, Husiatyn settlement hromada, Chortkiv Raion, Ternopil Oblast =

Trybukhivtsi Трибухівці
- Village
- Location within Ternopil Oblast
- Coordinates: 49°05′07″N 26°10′34″E
- Country: Ukraine
- Oblast: Ternopil Oblast
- District: Chortkiv Raion
- Established: 1562
- Elevation: 238 m (781 ft)

Population
  - Total: 833
- Time zone: UTC+2 (EET)
  - Summer (DST): UTC+3 (EEST)
- Postal code: 48253
- Area code: +380 3557
- Website: село Личківці (in Ukrainian)

Trybukhivtsi (Ukrainian: Трибухі́вці; Hebrew: טריבוחובצה, romanized: Tribukhovtse) is a village located on the right bank of the Zbruch River in Chortkiv Raion (district) of Chortkiv Oblast (province in western Ukraine). It belongs to Husiatyn settlement hromada, one of the hromadas of Ukraine.

The population of the village is just about 833 people and local government is administered by Lychkovetska village council.

== Geography ==
The village is situated on a gentle left bank Zbruch River and closely adjacent to the village of Lychkivtsi. It is located at a distance of 9 kilometres (5.6 mi) from the district center of Husiatyn along the road Highway T2002 (Ukraine) from Husiatyn to Skalat. A distance to the regional center Ternopil is 71 kilometres (44 mi) and 39 kilometres (24 mi) to Skalat.

== History and Attractions ==
The first written record about the villages Lychkivtsi and Trybukhivtsi dates from the 1562. Tripoli culture and Kievan Rus archaeological sites found near village.

Until 18 July 2020, Trybukhivtsi belonged to Husiatyn Raion. The raion was abolished in July 2020 as part of the administrative reform of Ukraine, which reduced the number of raions of Ternopil Oblast to three. The area of Husiatyn Raion was merged into Chortkiv Raion.

The village has an architectural monument of local importance of Husiatyn Raion – Church of the Protection 1888 (N 1879).
