= Holy Trinity Church, Mykulyntsi =

Church in Mykulyntsi, Ukraine

Holy Trinity Church
- Костел Пресвятої Трійці
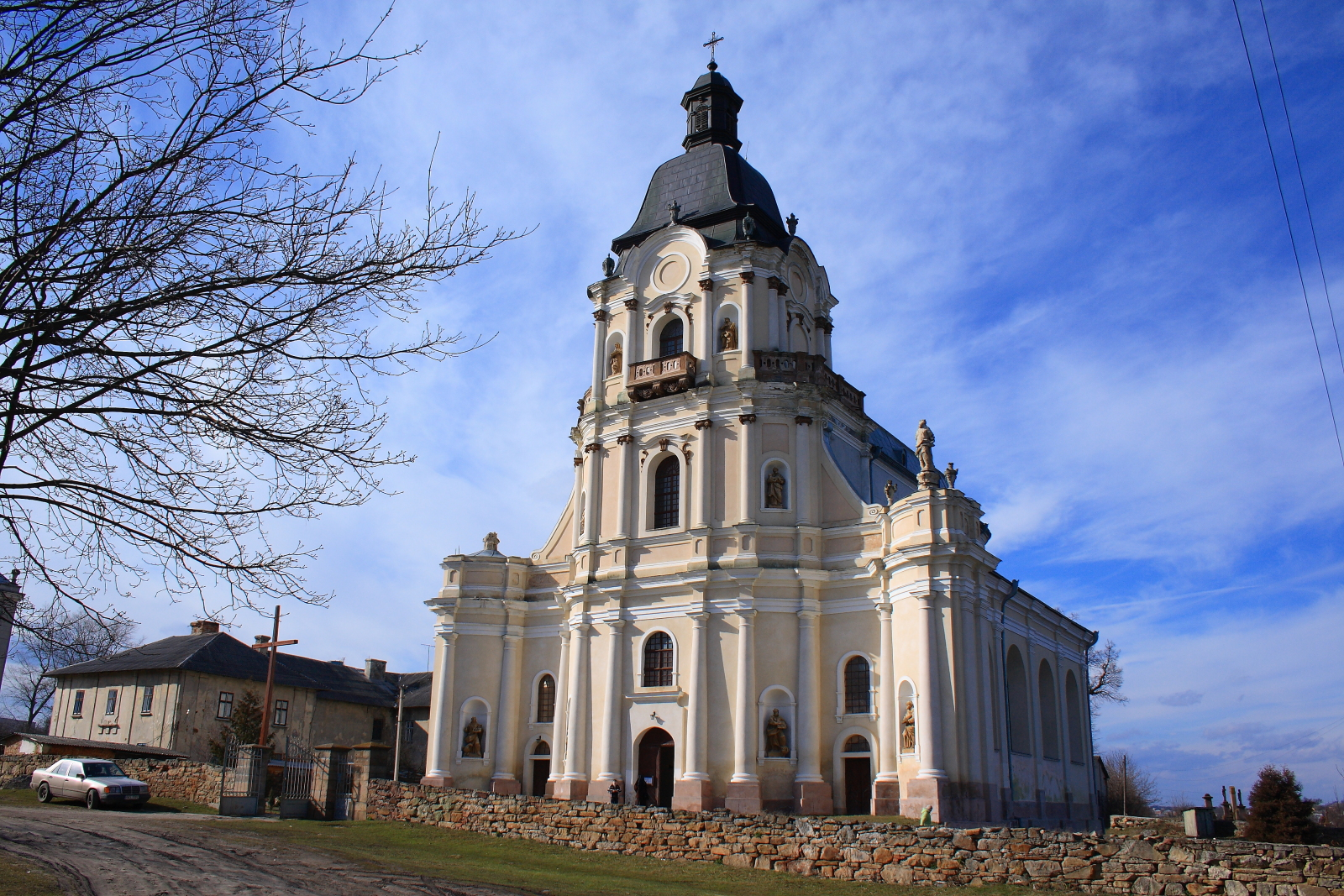

- Location within Ternopil Oblast

Location
- Location: Mykulyntsi
- Coordinates: 49°23′59.6″N 25°36′22.2″E

Immovable Monument of National Significance of Ukraine
- Official name: Костел (Church)
- Type: Architecture
- Reference no.: 190057

Holy Trinity Church (Ukrainian: Костел Пресвятої Трійці) is a Roman Catholic church, historic Baroque complex in Mykulyntsi, Ternopil Oblast. It is an architectural monument of national significance.

== History ==
In 1718, there was a wooden (oak) church dedicated to St. John the Baptist in Mykulyntsi.

Ludwika Potocka, née Mniszech, widow of Grand Crown Hetman Józef Potocki, funded a new brick church in Mykulyntsi. In 1761, Archbishop Wacław Hieronim Sierakowski of Lviv laid the cornerstone. The church was built on a new site and consecrated to the Holy Trinity by Wacław Hieronim Sierakowski in 1779. The stone sculptures decorating the facade of the church and the uniform style of woodcarving in the interior were probably made in the 1770s.

In 1780, Ludwika Potocka, née Mniszech, founded a monastery of the Vincentians (Missionaries) next to the church, who were also entrusted with running the parish and caring for the old church of St. John the Baptist. In 1785, Emperor Joseph II abolished the monastery by decree. The monastery building was then used as a home for the poor.

On 16 June 1799, the church was damaged by a storm. In 1859, the temple was damaged by fire.

The 22 chasubles belonging to Ludwika Potocka's foundation were probably made in the workshop in Krasiczyn.

According to Zbigniew Hornung, Marcin Twardowski, known as the "Mykulyntsi woodcarver", created the altar sculptures in the church. Hornung also called the sculptures "clumsy". Jan K. Ostrowski believes that the lack of comparative material does not allow for verification of Hornung's attribution, although this hypothesis is very likely. Jan K. Ostrowski also claims that the altar sculptures in the church are of average quality.

After World War II, the abandoned church gradually fell into disrepair. Some of the altar sculptures were taken over by the Lviv Picture Gallery and placed in museum warehouses in Olesko.

In 1989, the church was returned to Roman Catholics.

The church was restored according to a design by architect Zenoviy Lagush after the collapse of the USSR, when it was returned to the Roman Catholic Archdiocese of Lviv.

== An outline of artistic issues ==
Franciszek Klein was the first to draw attention to the church, pointing to the Dresden Cathedral as a model. Tadeusz Mańkowski, based on the preserved designs, attributed the authorship to August Fryderyk Moszyński (who in 1755 married Teofila Potocka, daughter of Stanisław, son of Józef Potocki). Mańkowski also noted the simplifications introduced by Moszyński and stated that the church was similar to St. George's Cathedral in Lviv. Tadeusz Jaroszewski pointed out the similarity of the temple to the church of S. Giorgio in Modica near Ragusa in Sicily. In his opinion, the towerless, classicizing version of the design of the facade of the church in Mikulińce resembles the design of the facade of the church of St. Roch in Paris, designed by Robert de Cotte.

== Bibliography ==
- Jan K. Ostrowski: Kościół p.w. Św. Trójcy i klasztor Misjonarzy w Mikulińcach. [W:] Materiały do dziejów sztuki sakralnej na ziemiach wschodnich dawnej Rzeczypospolitej. Cz. I : Kościoły i klasztory rzymskokatolickie dawnego województwa ruskiego. T. 4. Kraków : Międzynarodowe Centrum Kultury, Drukarnia narodowa, 1996, s. 53–64. ISBN 83-85739-34-3.
