= Ternopil Oblast =

Region of Ukraine

Ternopil Oblast Тернопільська область
- Oblast
- Ternopilska oblast
- Flag Coat of arms
- Nicknames: Тернопілля (Ternopillia), Тернопільщина (Ternopilshchyna)
- Coordinates: 49°33′21″N 25°35′33″E
- Country: Ukraine
- Administrative center: Ternopil

Government
  - Governor: Taras Pastukh
  - Oblast council: 64 seats
  - Chairperson: Volodymyr Bolyeshchuk

Area
  - Total: 13,823 km^{2} (5,337 sq mi)
  - Rank: Ranked 22nd

Population (2022)
  - Total: 1,021,713 ▼
  - Rank: Ranked 21st
  - Density: 73.914/km^{2} (191.44/sq mi)

GDP
  - Total: ₴ 82 billion (€2.1 billion)
  - Per capita: ₴ 79,412 (€2,100)
- Time zone: UTC+2 (EET)
- Postal code: 46-49
- Area code: +380-35
- ISO 3166 code: UA-61
- Raions: 3
- Cities: 14
- Settlements: 17
- Villages: 1019
- HDI (2022): 0.722 high
- FIPS 10-4: UP22
- NUTS statistical regions of Ukraine: UA52
- Website: www.adm.gov.te.ua

Ternopil Oblast (Ukrainian: Тернопільська область, romanized: Ternópilʹsʹka óblastʹ), also referred to as Ternopilshchyna (Ukrainian: Тернопільщина, romanized: Ternópilʹščyna) or Ternopillia (Ukrainian: Тернопілля, romanized: Ternopíllja), is an oblast (province) of Ukraine. Its administrative center is Ternopil, through which flows the Seret, a tributary of the Dniester. Population: 1,021,713 (2022 estimate).

One of the natural wonders of the region are its cave complexes. Although Ternopil Oblast is among the smallest regions in Ukraine, over 100 caves have been discovered there. Scientists believe these are only 20% of all possible caves in the region. The biggest cave is Optymistychna Cave. Measuring 267 km (166 mi) in total length, it is the longest cave in Eurasia and the fifth-longest in the world. Twenty percent of the land in the region is chernozem soil.

Among its attractions, Ternopil Oblast has 34 castles. By at least one account, the most prominent is the Zbarazh Castle with fortifications that expand over 16 ha (40 acres) and was the center of a 17th-century standoff between troops of Bohdan Khmelnytsky and the army of the Polish–Lithuanian Commonwealth. The Dniester Canyon passes through the oblast; it is considered one of the wonders of Ukraine, stretching for 250 km (160 mi).

== Geography ==
The oblast is located in western Ukraine and has an area of 13,800 km^{2} (5,300 sq mi). It is situated at the western part of the Podilian Upland, which is known for its rocky terrain. Among noticeable mountains there are the Kremenets Mountains. The oblast is also famous for its caves.

One of the major rivers in the country, the Dniester, forms the southern and southwestern borders of Ternopil Oblast with the adjacent Chernivtsi Oblast and Ivano-Frankivsk Oblast. Its tributaries that flow through the oblast include Zbruch, Seret, and Strypa. The Seret River is a left tributary of the Dniester flowing through the city of Ternopil.

Ternopil Oblast is surrounded by five other oblasts of Ukraine: Chernivtsi Oblast – to the south, Ivano-Frankivsk Oblast – to the southwest, Lviv Oblast – to the northwest, Rivne Oblast – to the north, and Khmelnytskyi Oblast – to the east.

== History ==
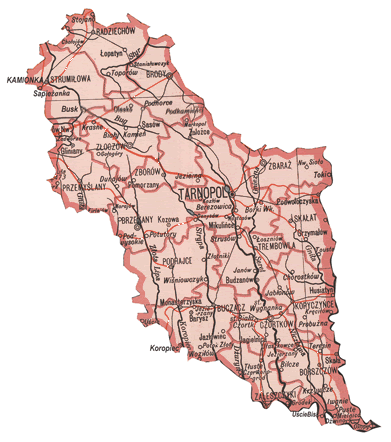
Ternopil region until 1939

Historic administrative affiliation of the area:

- 1199–1253: Principality of Galicia-Volhynia
- 1253–1434: Kingdom of Galicia-Volhynia
- 1434–1569: Kingdom of Poland: Ruthenian Voivodeship, Podolian Voivodeship / Grand Duchy of Lithuania: Ziemia wołyńska
- 1566–1569: Kingdom of Poland: Ruthenian Voivodship, Podolskie Voivodship / Grand Duchy of Lithuania: Volyn Voivodship
- 1569–1672: Polish-Lithuanian Commonwealth, Crown of the Kingdom of Poland, Lesser Poland Province of the Polish Crown (Małopolska): Ruthenian Voivodeship, Volyn Voivodeship, Podolskie Voivodeship
- 1672–1699: Poland-Lithuania, Crown of the Kingdom of Poland, Małopolska province: Ruthenian Voivodeship, Volyn Voivodeship / Ottoman Empire: Podolia Eyalet
- 1699–1772: Poland-Lithuania, Crown of the Kingdom of Poland, Małopolska province: Ruthenian Voivodeship, Volyn Voivodeship, Podolskie Voivodeship
- 1772–1795: Habsburg monarchy: Kingdom of Galicia and Lodomeria (Austrian Partition) / Poland-Lithuania, Crown of the Kingdom of Poland, Lesser Poland Province: Volhynia Voivodship
- 1795–1804: Habsburg Monarchy: Galicia and Lodomeria, East Galicia (Austrian Partition) / Russian Empire: Volhynia Governorate (Russian Partition)
- 1804–1809: Austrian Empire: Galicia and Lodomeria, East Galicia (Austrian Partition) / Russian Empire: Volyn Governorate (Russian Partition)
- 1809–1815: Austrian Empire: Galicia and Lodomeria (Austrian Partition) / Russian Empire: Volyn Governorate (Russian Partition), Tarnopolsky Krai (formerly of the Austrian Partition)
- 1815–1867: Austrian Empire: Galicia and Lodomeria (Austrian Partition) / Russian Empire: Volyn Governorate (Russian Partition)
- 1867–November 1918: Austria-Hungary: Galicia and Lodomeria (Austrian Partition) / Russian Empire: Volhynia Governorate (Russian Partition)
- November 1918–July 1919 - West Ukrainian People's Republic (de facto)
- 1919 (de facto; 1923 de jure)–1945: Rzeczpospolita Polska: Tarnopol Voivodeship, Volyn Voivodeship
- 1944 (de facto; 1945 de jure)–1991: USSR, Ukrainian SSR: Ternopil region
- since 1991: Ukraine: Ternopil region

From the 12th century the area belonged to Galicia–Volhynia until Galicia–Volhynia was incorporated into the Kingdom of Poland and Grand Duchy of Lithuania in the 14th century.

In 1569 Poland and Lithuania united into the Polish-Lithuanian Commonwealth.

From the First Partition of Poland in 1772 until the end of World War I the area which would become Ternopil Oblast was mostly part of the Kingdom of Galicia and Lodomeria, a possession of the Habsburg Monarchy, Austrian Empire and finally Austria-Hungary. In Ukraine today, there are three oblasts (provinces) that largely formed the eastern part of Galicia and Lodomeria until 1918. Ivano-Frankivsk Oblast was entirely contained in the kingdom, as was the vast majority of Lviv Oblast (only a few small areas and villages near Sokal were not). The southern and central parts of Ternopil Oblast were within the kingdom while the northern parts (pre-2020 raions: Kremenets, Shumsk, Lanivtsi and the northern half of Zbarazh; post-2020: Kremenets Raion and small parts of Ternopil Raion) remained with Poland Lithuania; from 1795 (Third Partition) they belonged to the Russian Volhynian Governorate (specifically the Kremenetsky Uyezd). During the Napoleonic Wars the area around Ternopil was annexed by Russia in the 1809 Treaty of Schönbrunn becoming the Tarnopolsky Krai; it was ceded back to Austria in 1815 (Congress of Vienna). The Tarnopolsky Krai roughly covered the eastern two-thirds of the post-2022 Ternopil Raion and the Chortkiv Raion up to the Strypa; in pre-2020 terms it corresponded with the cities of Ternopil and Chortkiv and the Borshchiv, Chortkiv, Husiatyn, Pidvolochysk, Terebovlia, Ternopil and Zalishchyky raions, the southern half of Zbarazh raion, the eastern and northern parts of Buchach raion and some eastern parts of Zboriv and Kozova raions.

From 1917 the formerly Russian part came under the Ukrainian People's Republic (Ukrainian State April–December 1918; also claimed by the Ukrainian People's Republic of Soviets/Ukrainian Soviet Republic December 1917–April 1918 and the Ukrainian SSR from March 1919); from 1918 the formerly Austrian part was controlled by the West Ukrainian People's Republic (nominally part of the Ukrainian People's Republic from 22 January 1919) but ultimately the whole area fell to the Second Polish Republic in 1921 following the Ukrainian War of Independence, Polish–Ukrainian War and Polish–Soviet War. The formerly Austrian parts became part of the Tarnopol Voivodeship, while the formerly Russian parts became part of the Volhynian Voivodeship, specifically the Krzemieniec county. The southern pre-2020 raions of Ternopil Oblast were partially coterminous with Galicia and Lodomeria's districts/counties and Interwar Poland's counties.

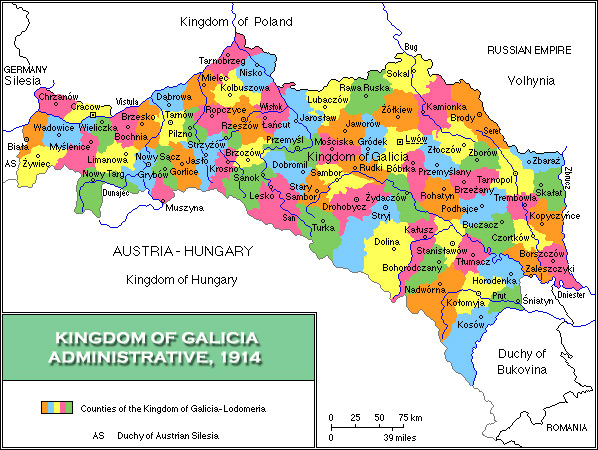
Kingdom of Galicia, administrative, 1914

Raions of Ternopil Oblast (until 2020)	Equivalent districts/counties of Galicia and Lodomeria
Berezhany Raion	Western part of Brzeżany county.
Borshchiv Raion	Borszczów
Buchach Raion	Buczacz county
Chortkiv Raion	Czortków and the southern part of Kopychyntsi county
Husiatyn Raion	Kopychyntsi
Kozova Raion	Eastern part of Brzeżany county except for the city of Brzeżany itself.
Monastyryska Raion	Western part of Buczacz county.
Pidhaitsi Raion	Western part of Podhajce county.
Pidvolochysk Raion	Skalat county and the eastern part of Zbaraż county
Terebovlia Raion	Trembowla county in the east and Podhajce county in the west.
Ternopil Raion	Tarnopol county
Zalishchyky Raion	Zalishchyky
Zbarazh Raion	The western part of Zbaraż county and the southern part of Brody county.
Zboriv Raion	Zborów county

The oblast was created during the Second World War when both Nazi Germany and later the Soviet Union invaded Poland. Due to the Polish national policy in the area (Pacification action), many people favored the Soviet invasion of Eastern Galicia at first. However, soon thereafter, the Soviet security agencies started a witch hunt among nationally oriented members of Ukrainian resistance who emigrated to Poland after the Soviet-Ukrainian War as well as other reasons. Many of local population were exiled to Siberia regardless of their ethnic background. On December 4, 1939, the voivodeship division in the West Ukraine was abolished and replaced with the existing Soviet administrative division oblast. Ternopil Oblast (originally Tarnopol Oblast) was established based mostly on the Tarnopol Voivodeship and southern portions of the Volhynian Voivodeship.

During the invasion of the Soviet Union by Nazi Germany, Ternopil became an object of fierce fighting between Soviet and German forces because of its importance as a rail transportation hub. During German occupation, the region (except for its Volhynian portion) became part of the District of Galicia and transferred to administration by the General Government. After the war, a destroyed residential section of Ternopil, near the river, was turned into an artificial lake rather than being rebuilt. Additionally, upon annexation to the Soviet Union's Ukrainian SSR, most ethnic Poles in the region were forcibly relocated to Poland, whose national borders had shifted far to the west. The area of the former Polish voivodeship was expanded by adding territory in the north, though the westernmost parts were transferred to the Lviv oblast. After 1945 Soviet authorities also encouraged ethnic Russians to settle in territories newly annexed to the Soviet Union, including the Ternopil oblast, though western Ukraine remained considerably less Russian than eastern Ukraine.

As Ukraine achieved independence in the 1990s, western Ukraine remained the heartland of Ukrainian political and cultural nationalism, and the political affiliations of Ternopil voters reflected that viewpoint. In the first elections after independence, the People's Movement of Ukraine was the leading party in the oblast. A majority of oblast voters supported the Ukrainian nationalist-oriented Electoral Bloc Yuliya Tymoshenko in the 2002 Ukrainian parliamentary election. Over 88% of voters supported Yulia Tymoshenko of the All-Ukrainian Union "Fatherland" in the 2010 Ukrainian presidential election.

By 2005, the population of the oblast had grown to roughly 225,000, consisting primarily of ethnic Ukrainians with a large Russian or Russian-speaking minority. The city of Ternopil has important institutions of higher education, including two teacher's colleges, an international medical school with instruction in English, and one of three economics institutes in Ukraine.

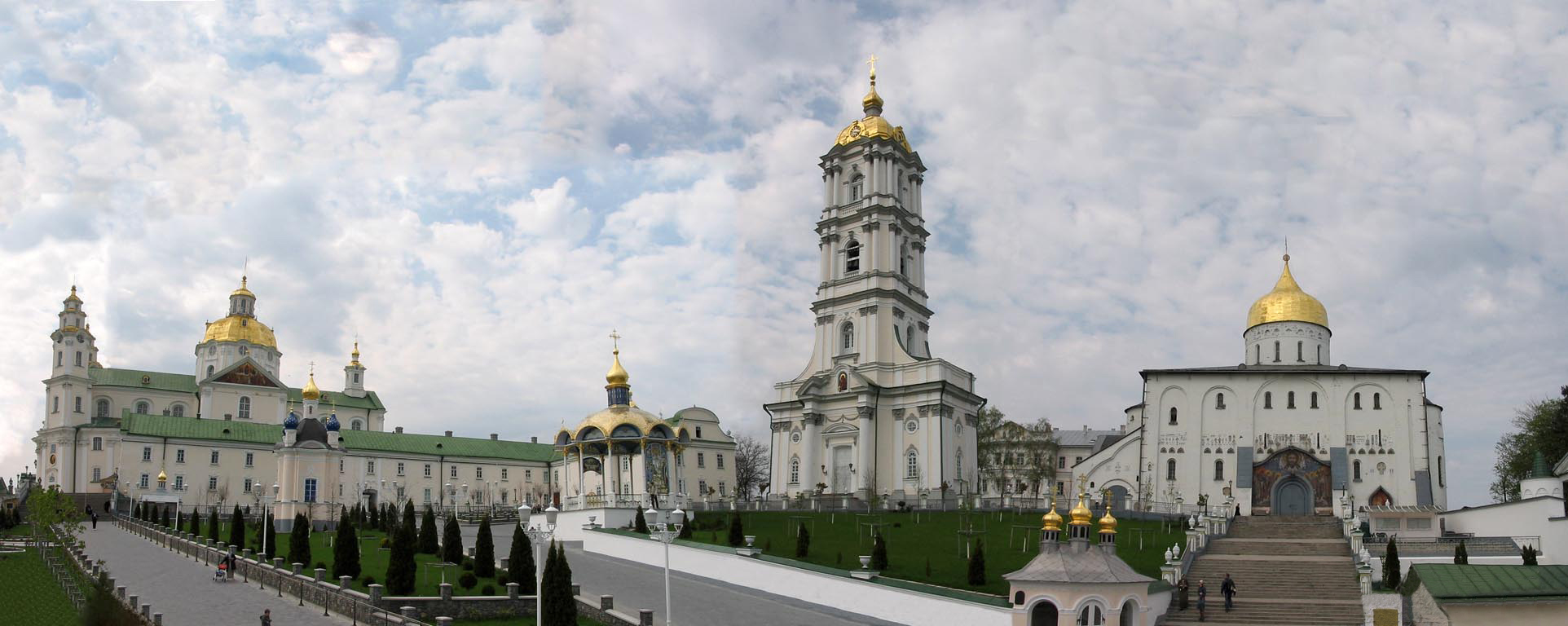
Pochaiv Monastery

The religion of the majority is Ukrainian Greek Catholic, though there is a notable Orthodox presence and a small Protestant minority. Holy Trinity Church, Mykulyntsi is an 18th-century Roman Catholic church considered to be an architectural monument of national importance. Many churches which were closed or destroyed under Soviet rule have rebuilt since independence. The local Jewish community, which was very large before 1939, disappeared in the Holocaust and was not reestablished after 1945. There are no active synagogues in the oblast and only a few isolated individuals affiliating with the Jewish faith.

== Points of interest ==
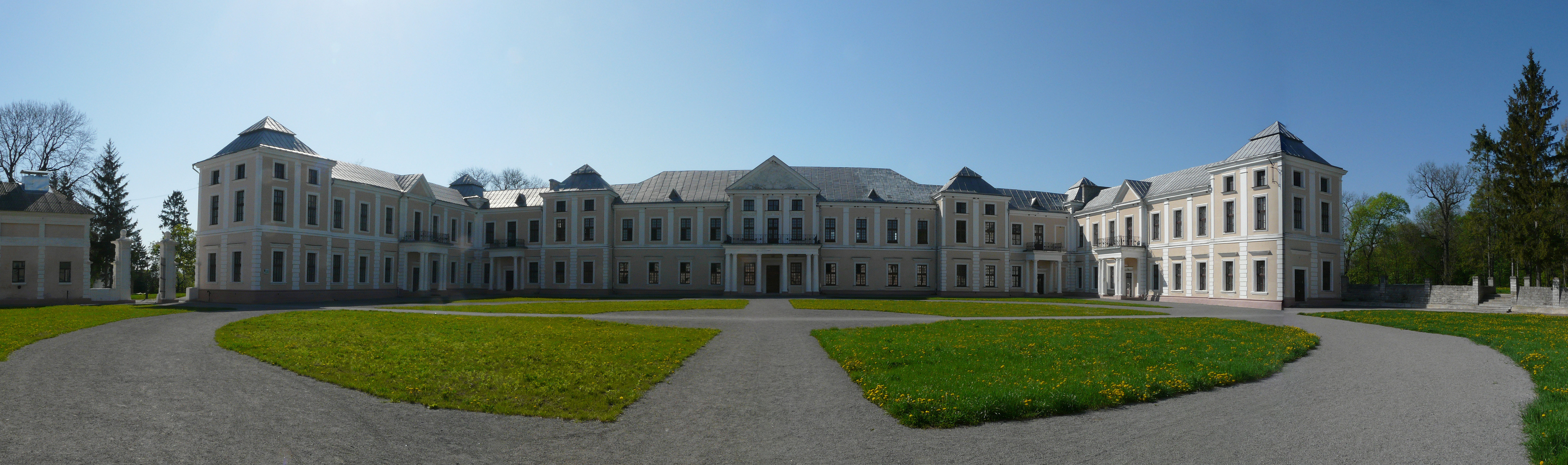
Vyshnivets Palace

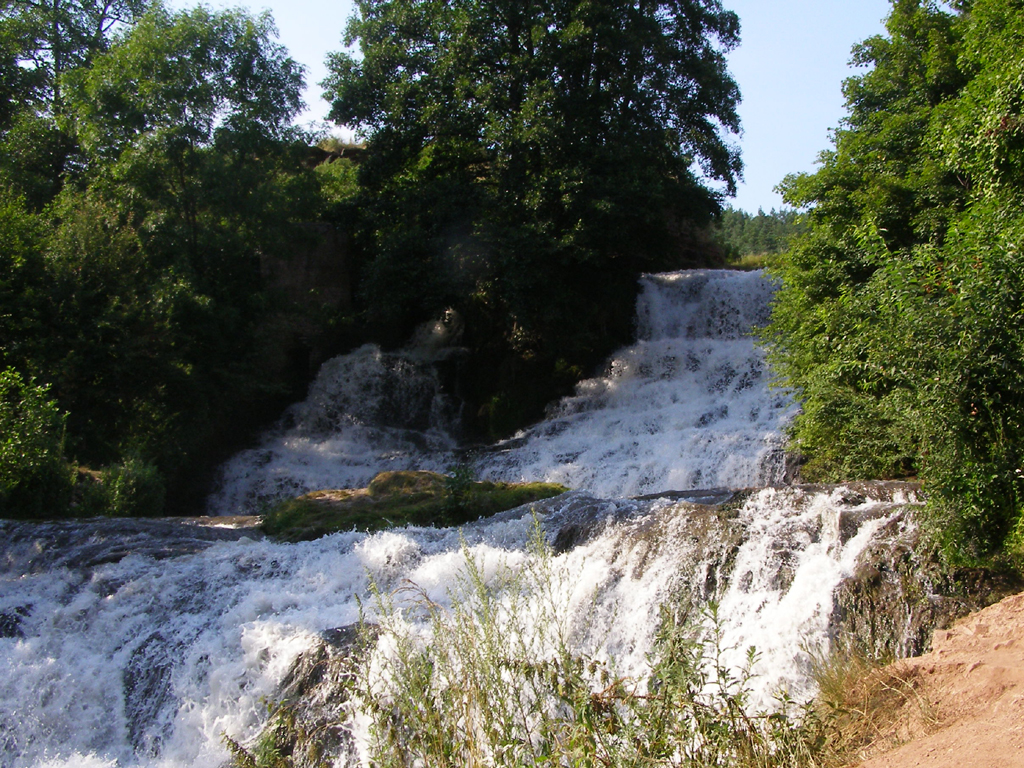
Dzhuryn Waterfall, one of the highest in Ukraine

The oblast is known for its castles and fortresses. Due to the underfunding of the state program for the preservation of cultural heritage, many of objects of historical significance are in poor condition. The following historic-cultural sites were nominated for the Seven Wonders of Ukraine.

- Verteba Cave, a cave in Borshchiv Raion
- Bohyt, a hill near Zbruch River where was found the Zbruch idol (Husiatyn Raion)
- Buchach Ratusha, a former town hall in Buchach
- Pochaiv Lavra, located in the city of Pochaiv, one of the biggest holy places of Christian Orthodox in Ukraine
- Zarvanytsia Spiritual Center, a big holy place of Greek Catholics of Podillia (Terebovlia Raion)
- Vyshnivets Palace, a princely palace in Vyshnivets (Zbarazh Raion)
- Camp UPA, a museum of Ukrainian resistance movement in Shumsk Raion
- Dzhuryn Waterfall
- Castles of Ternopil Region (Ternopil Castle, Berezhany Castle, Zbarazh Castle, and others)

== Population ==
The estimated population is 1,038,694 (2020 est.)

=== Ethnic composition ===
According to the 2001 Ukrainian census, ethnic Ukrainians accounted for 97.8% of the population of Ternopil Oblast, and ethnic Russians for 1.2%.

=== Language ===
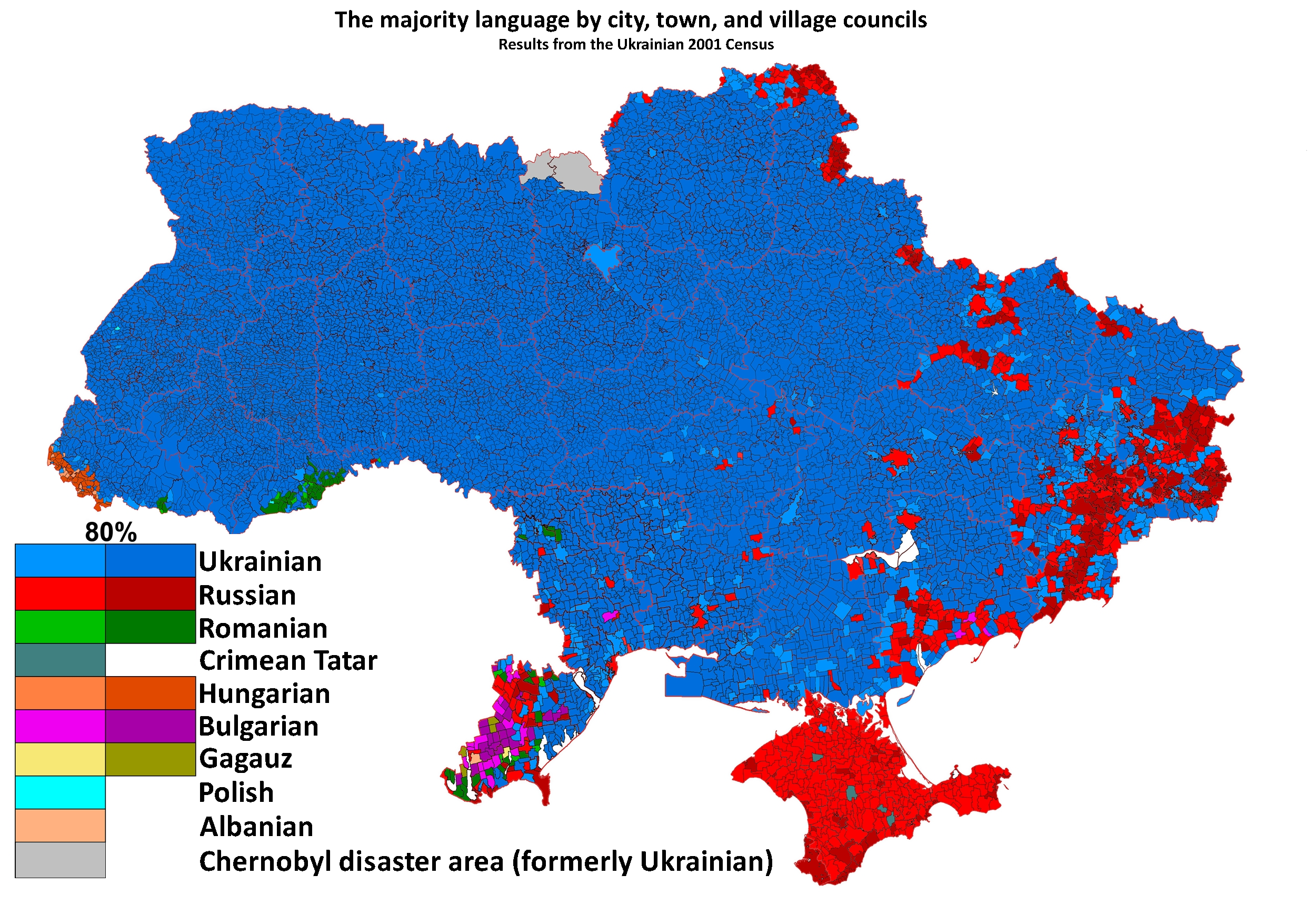
According to the 2001 Ukrainian census, Ukrainian was the native language for over 98% of Ternopil Oblast's population: it was the dominant language in all of the city, town, and village councils of the oblast.

Ternopil Oblast was one of the few oblasts of the Ukrainian SSR where the share of Ukrainian speakers was increasing despite the Russification of Ukraine carried out in the USSR. Native language of the population of Ternopil Oblast according to the results of population censuses:

	1959	1970	1989	2001
Ukrainian	94.6%	97.1%	97.3%	98.3%
Russian	2.9%	2.6%	2.5%	1.2%
Other	2.5%	0.3%	0.2%	0.2%

Native language of the population of the raions and cities of Ternopil Oblast according to the 2001 Ukrainian census:

	Ukrainian	Russian
Ternopil Oblast	98.3%	1.2%
City of Ternopil	94.8%	3.4%
Berezhany Raion	99.3%	0.6%
Borshchiv Raion	99.2%	0.7%
Buchach Raion	99.6%	0.3%
Husiatyn Raion	99.4%	0.4%
Zalishchyky Raion	99.5%	0.5%
Zbarazh Raion	98.3%	1.6%
Zboriv Raion	99.7%	0.2%
Kozova Raion	99.6%	0.3%
Kremenets Raion (in pre-2020 borders)	98.7%	1.1%
Lanivtsi Raion	99.2%	0.7%
Monastyryska Raion	99.6%	0.3%
Pidvolochysk Raion	99.5%	0.4%
Pidhaitsi Raion	99.8%	0.1%
Terebovlia Raion	99.4%	0.5%
Ternopil Raion (in pre-2020 borders)	99.5%	0.4%
Chortkiv Raion (in pre-2020 borders)	98.3%	1.5%
Shumsk Raion	99.4%	0.5%

Ukrainian is the only official language on the whole territory of Ternopil Oblast.

On 6 November 2018, a moratorium on the public use of Russian-language cultural products was imposed in Ternopil Oblast by a decision of the Ternopil Oblast Council.

According to a poll conducted by Rating from 16 November to 10 December 2018 as part of the project «Portraits of Regions», 95% of the residents of Ternopil Oblast believed that the Ukrainian language should be the only state language on the entire territory of Ukraine. 2% believed that Ukrainian should be the only state language, while Russian should be the second official language in some regions of the country. 3% found it difficult to answer.

In 2022, Ternopil Oblast Council approved the «Regional Programme for the Development and Functioning of the Ukrainian Language in the Ternopil Oblast for 2023—2027», the main objectives of which are to strengthen the positions of the Ukrainian language in various spheres of public life in the oblast and to Ukrainianize the refugees from other regions of Ukraine.

According to the research of the Content Analysis Centre, conducted from 15 August to 15 September 2024, the topic of which was the ratio of Ukrainian and Russian languages in the Ukrainian segment of social media, 94.6% of posts from Ternopil Oblast were written in Ukrainian (92.0% in 2023, 85.8% in 2022, 49.5% in 2020), while 5.4% were written in Russian (8.0% in 2023, 14.2% in 2022, 50.5% in 2020).

After Ukraine declared independence in 1991, Ternopil Oblast, as well as Ukraine as a whole, experienced a gradual Ukrainization of the education system, which had been Russified during the Soviet era. Dynamics of the ratio of the languages of instruction in general secondary education institutions in Ternopil Oblast:

Language of instruction, % of pupils	1991— 1992	1992— 1993	1993— 1994	1994— 1995	1995— 1996	2000— 2001	2005— 2006	2007— 2008	2010— 2011	2012— 2013	2015— 2016	2018— 2019	2021— 2022	2022— 2023
Ukrainian	97.6%	98.0%	98.4%	98.7%	99.0%	99.7%	99.8%	99.9%	99.9%	99.9%	99.9%	99.9%	100.0%	100.0%
Russian	2.4%	2.0%	1.6%	1.3%	1.0%	0.3%	0.2%	0.1%	0.1%	0.1%	0.1%	0.1%	—	—

According to the State Statistics Service of Ukraine, in the 2023—2024 school year, all 105,619 pupils in general secondary education institutions in Ternopil Oblast were studying in classes where Ukrainian was the language of instruction.

=== Age structure ===
0-14 years: 15.7% ▲ (male 86,309/female 81,940)
15-64 years: 69.0% (male 360,305/female 381,271)
65 years and over: 15.3% ▼ (male 53,364/female 110,887) (2013 official)

=== Median age ===
total: 38.6 years ▲
male: 35.8 years ▲
female: 41.4 years ▲ (2013 official)

== Economy and transportation ==
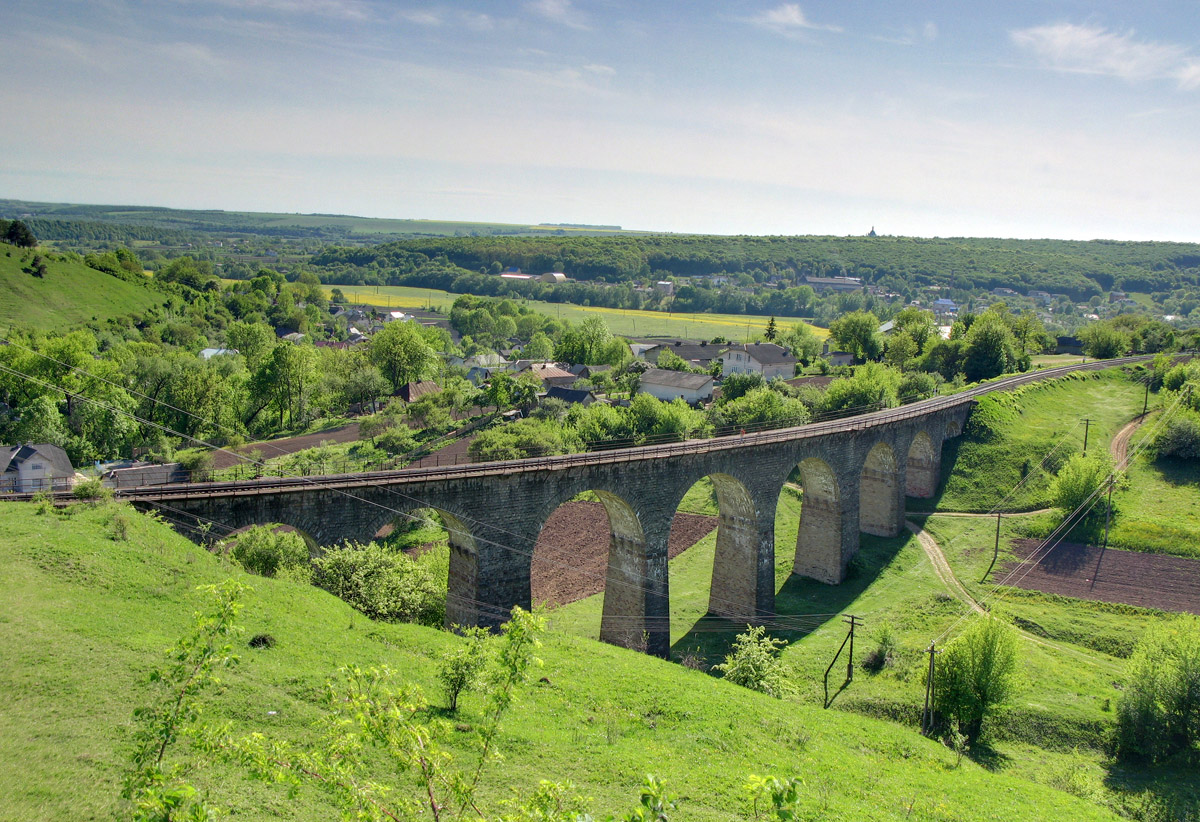
Bridge near Terebovlia

The economy is predominantly agriculturally oriented. Among industries, there is a well developed food industry particularly sugar production, alcohol, and dairy (such as butter). There is also number of factories such as "Vatra" (lighting equipment), Ternopil Harvester Plant, "Orion" (radio communication) among a few.

Ternopil Oblast has an adequate network of highways, while the city of Ternopil is located at the intersection of main European corridors along the E50 and E85 highways. There is a small airport in Ternopil (Ternopil Airport) which however mostly is used for charter flights. There is a well developed railroad network which is a part of the Lviv Railways. Water transportation is very limited and mostly along the Dniester River.

== Subdivisions ==
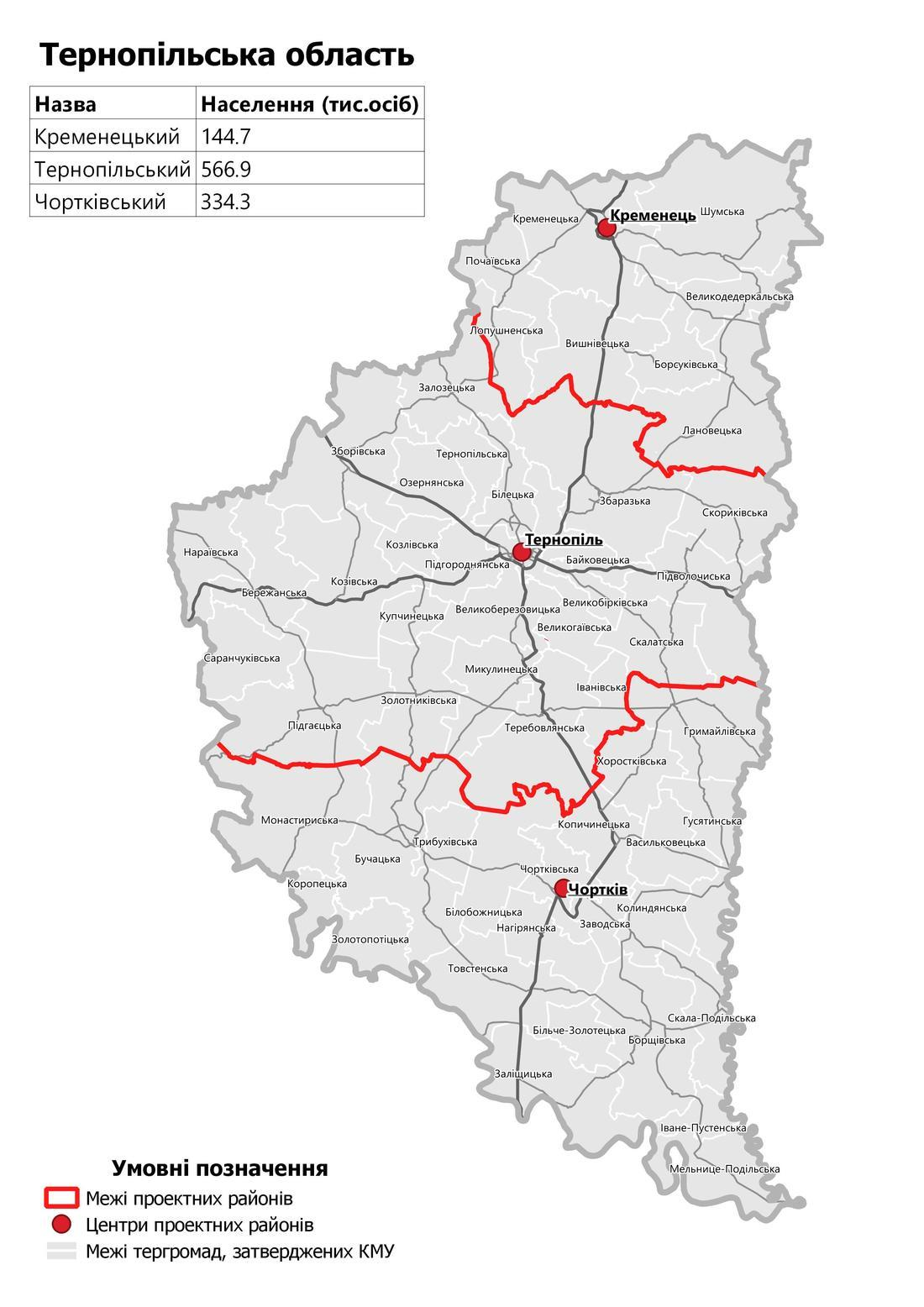
Map of Ternopil Oblast after July 2020

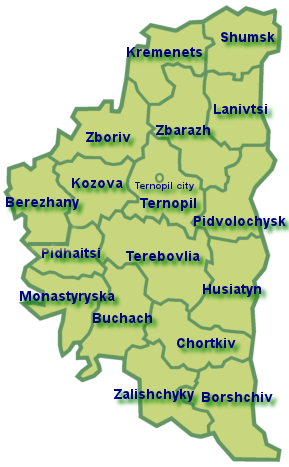
Map of Ternopil Oblast before July 2020

After 18 July 2020

#	Name	Center	Year	Area (km^{2})	Population	Hromadas	Populated place		
#	Name	Center	Year	Area (km^{2})	Population	Hromadas	City	Town	Village
1	Kremenets	Kremenets			144,7	8	4	1	
2	Ternopil	Ternopil			566,9	25	7	6	
3	Chortkiv	Chortkiv			334,3	22	7	9	

Before 18 July 2020 Before the 2020 administrative reform, Ternopil Oblast was administratively subdivided into 17 raions (districts), as well as 1 city (municipality) which is directly subordinate to the oblast government: Ternopil, the administrative center of the oblast. The average area of a raion was around 808 km^{2} (312 sq mi), the biggest one was Terebovlia Raion covering 1,130 km^{2} (440 sq mi) and the smallest one - Pidhaitsi Raion with 496 km^{2} (192 sq mi). The average population number was around 50.6 thousands which is just below the national average.

Raions of the Ternopil Oblast
In English	In Ukrainian	Administrative Center
Berezhany Raion	Бережанський район Berezhanskyi raion	Berezhany (City)
Borshchiv Raion	Борщівський район Borshchivskyi raion	Borshchiv (City)
Buchach Raion	Бучацький район Buchatskyi raion	Buchach (City)
Chortkiv Raion	Чортківський район Chortkivskyi raion	Chortkiv (City)
Husiatyn Raion	Гусятинський район Husiatynskyi raion	Husiatyn (Urban-type settlement)
Kozova Raion	Козівський район Kozivskyi raion	Kozova (Urban-type settlement)
Kremenets Raion	Кременецький район Kremenetskyi raion	Kremenets (City)
Lanivtsi Raion	Лановецький район Lanovetskyi raion	Lanivtsi (City)
Monastyryska Raion	Монастириський район Monastyryskyi raion	Monastyryska (City)
Pidhaitsi Raion	Підгаєцький район Pidhayetskyi raion	Pidhaitsi (City)
Pidvolochysk Raion	Підволочиський район Pidvolochyskyi raion	Pidvolochysk (Urban-type settlement)
Shumsk Raion	Шумський район Shumskyi raion	Shumsk (City)
Terebovlia Raion	Теребовлянський район Terebovlanskyi raion	Terebovlia (City)
Ternopil Raion	Тернопільський район Ternopilskyi raion	Ternopil (City)
Zalishchyky Raion	Заліщицький район Zalishchytskyi raion	Zalishchyky (City)
Zbarazh Raion	Збаразький район Zbarazkyi raion	Zbarazh (City)
Zboriv Raion	Зборівський район Zborivskyi raion	Zboriv (City)

== Notable people ==
In town of Buchach was born a Nobel Prize recipient, writer Shmuel Yosef Agnon. The prize was given for works about fate of Galician Jews. Agnon worked for a Lviv newspaper, but after refusal to serve in the army he moved to Mandatory Palestine. In Ukraine he published over 70 of his early works.

- Solomiya Krushelnytska, one of the brightest soprano opera stars of the first half of the 20th century, was born in Biliavyntsi., Chortkiv Raion.
- Petro Gadz, entrepreneur and politician
- Mike Mazurki, American professional athlete and actor 196 cm (6 ft 5 in) in height
- Lee Strasberg, American theatre director and actor
- Mykola Bychok, Cardinal who participated in the 2025 papal conclave which elected Leo XIV was born here in 1980

== Gallery ==
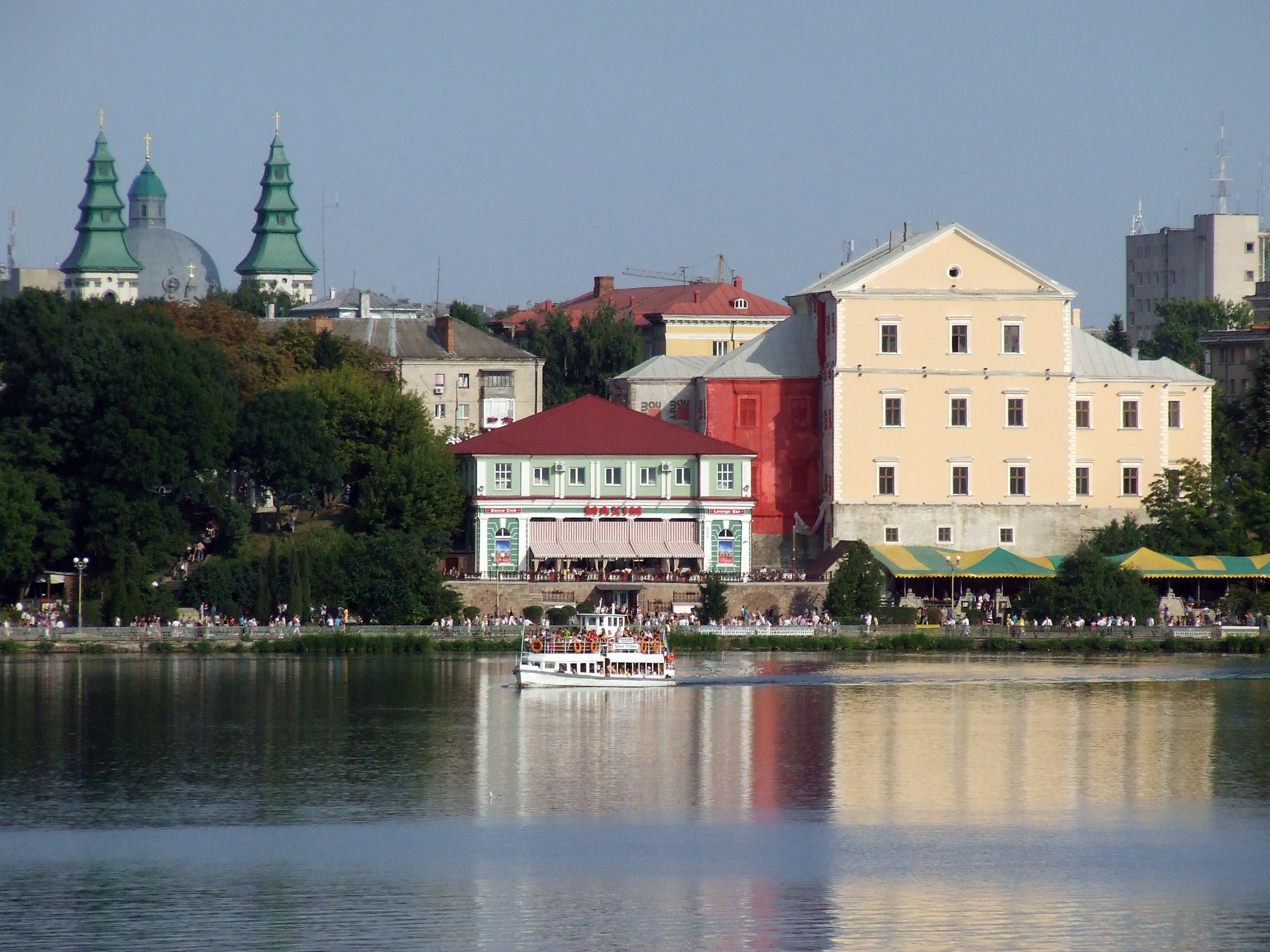
Ternopil Buran

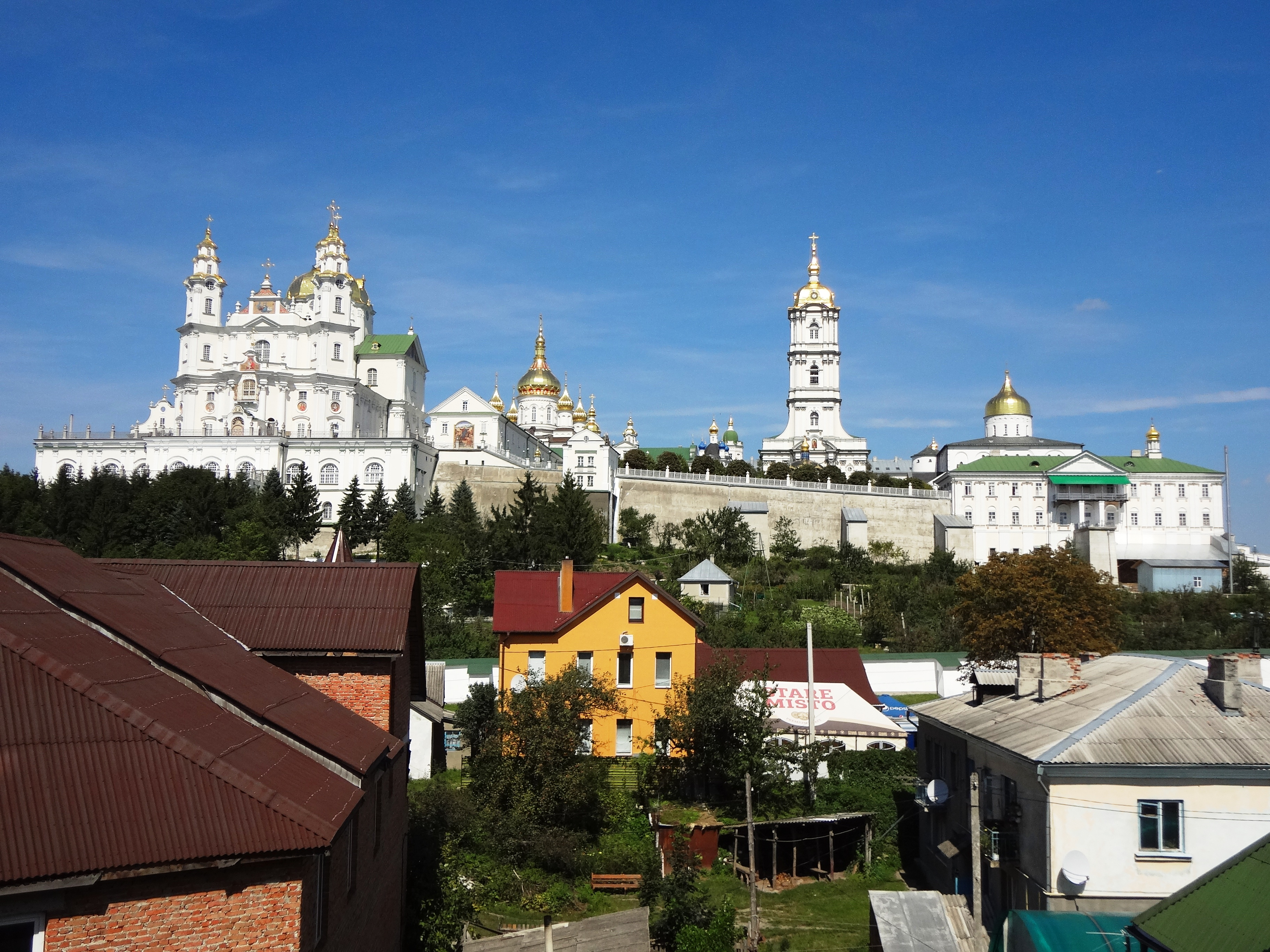
Pochaiv Lavra

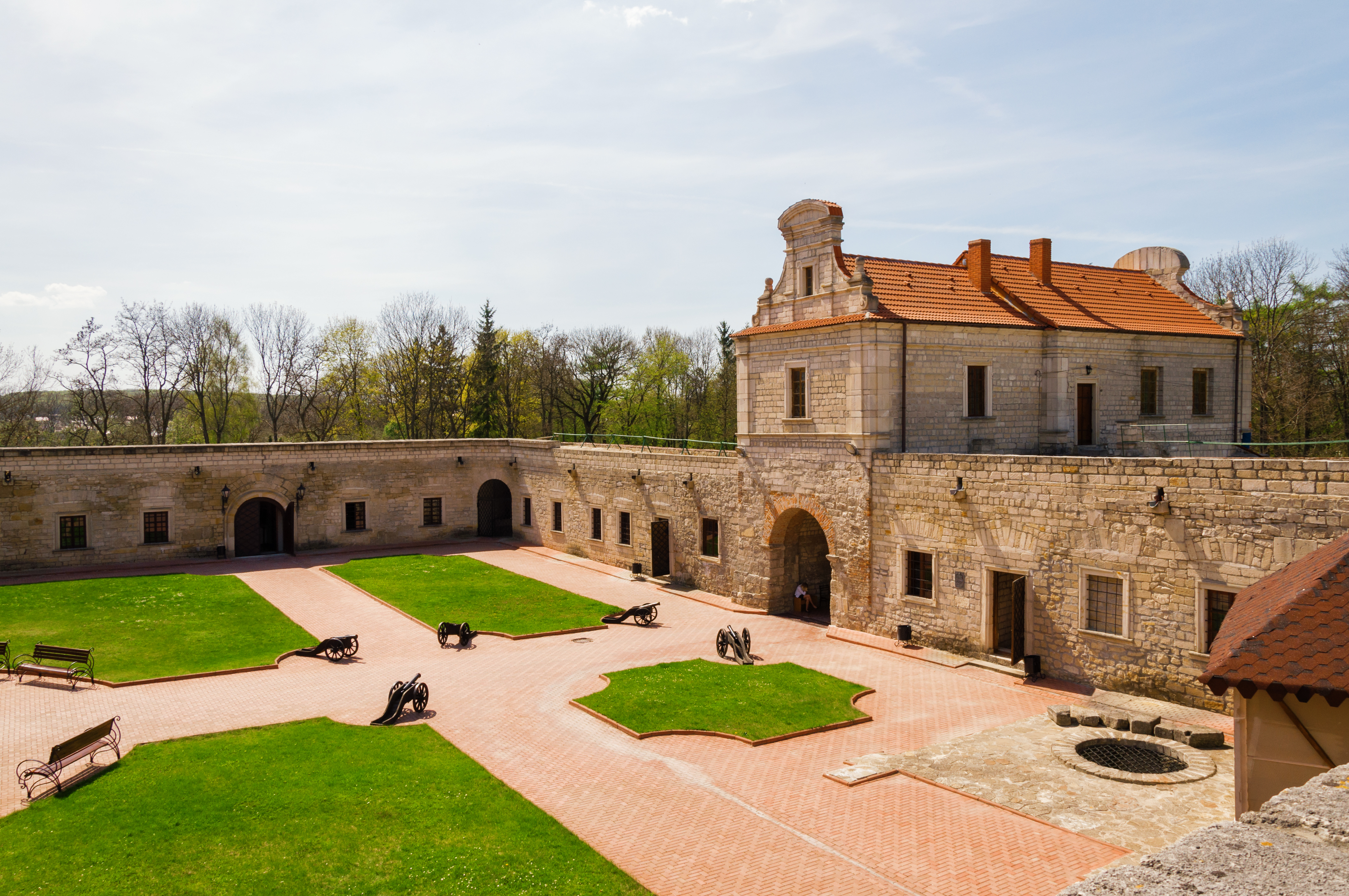
Zbarazh Castle

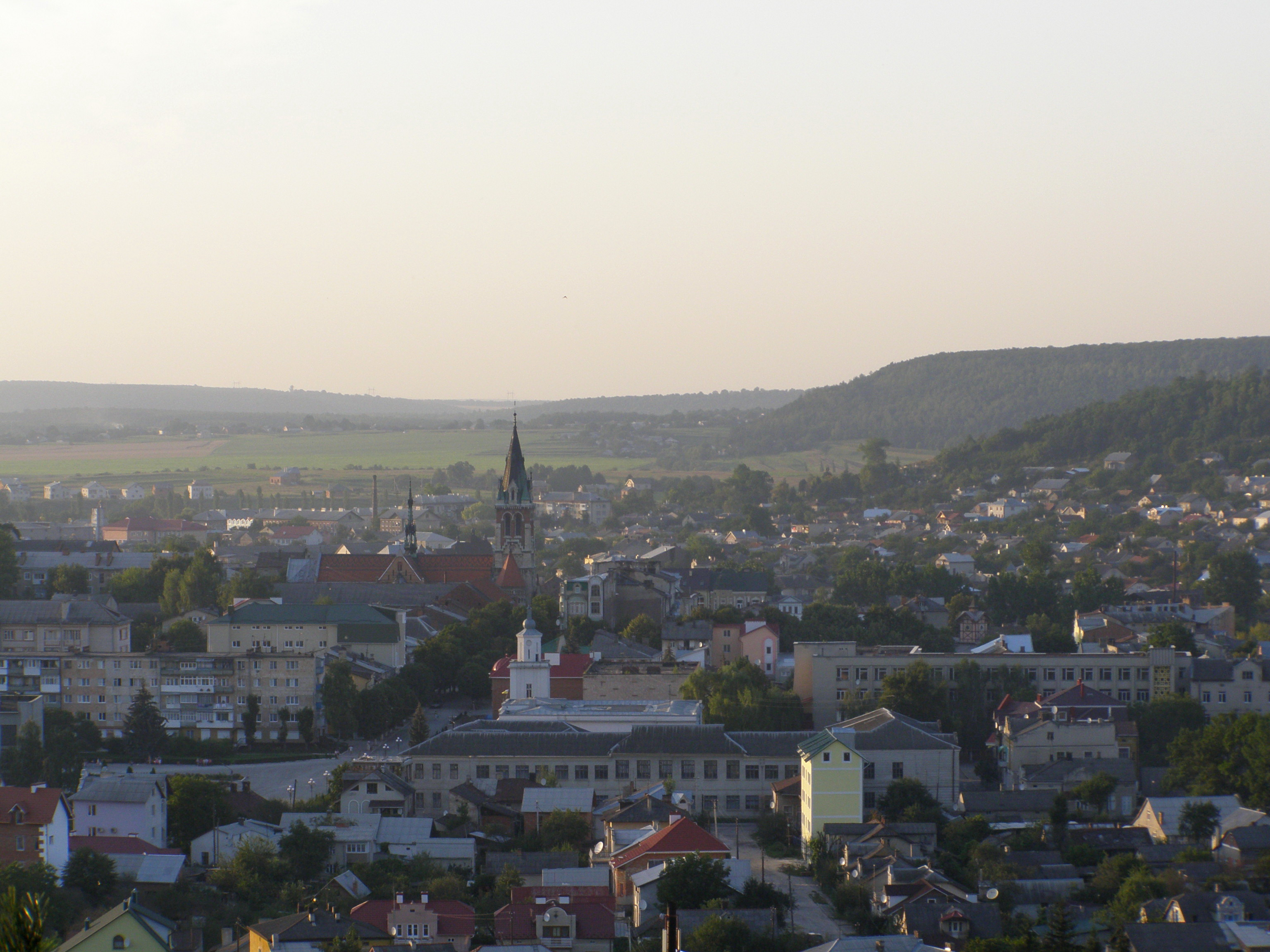
Chortkiv

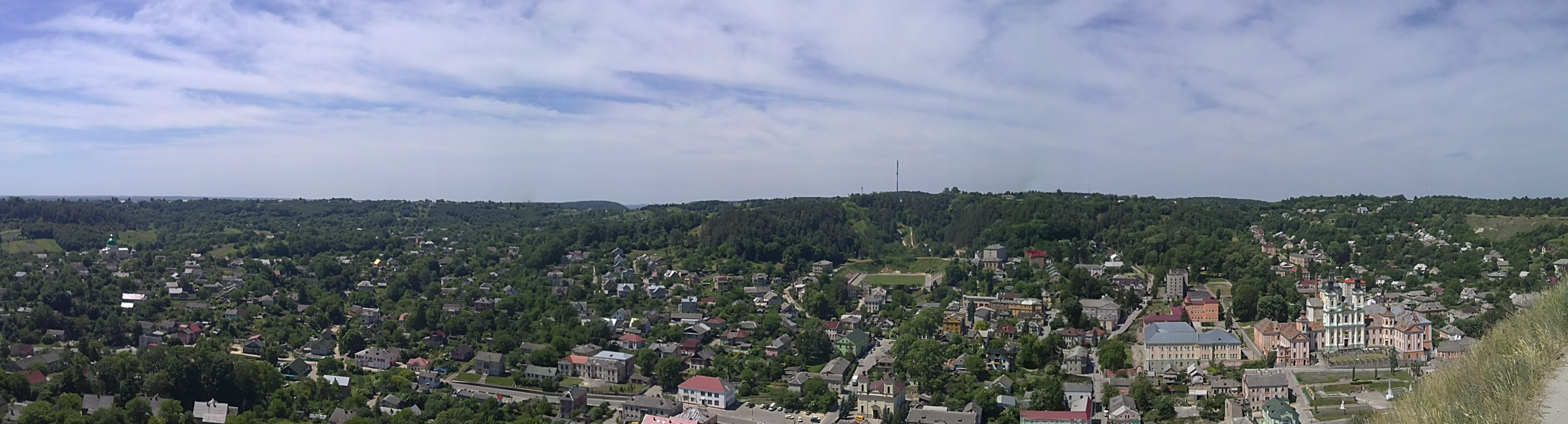
Kremenets from Zamkova Hill

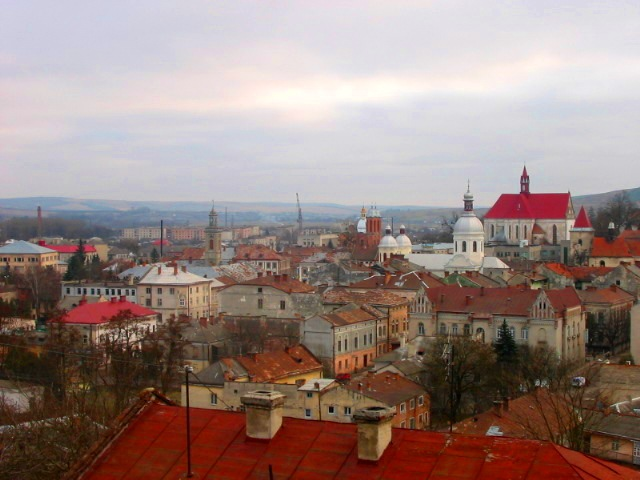
Berezhany

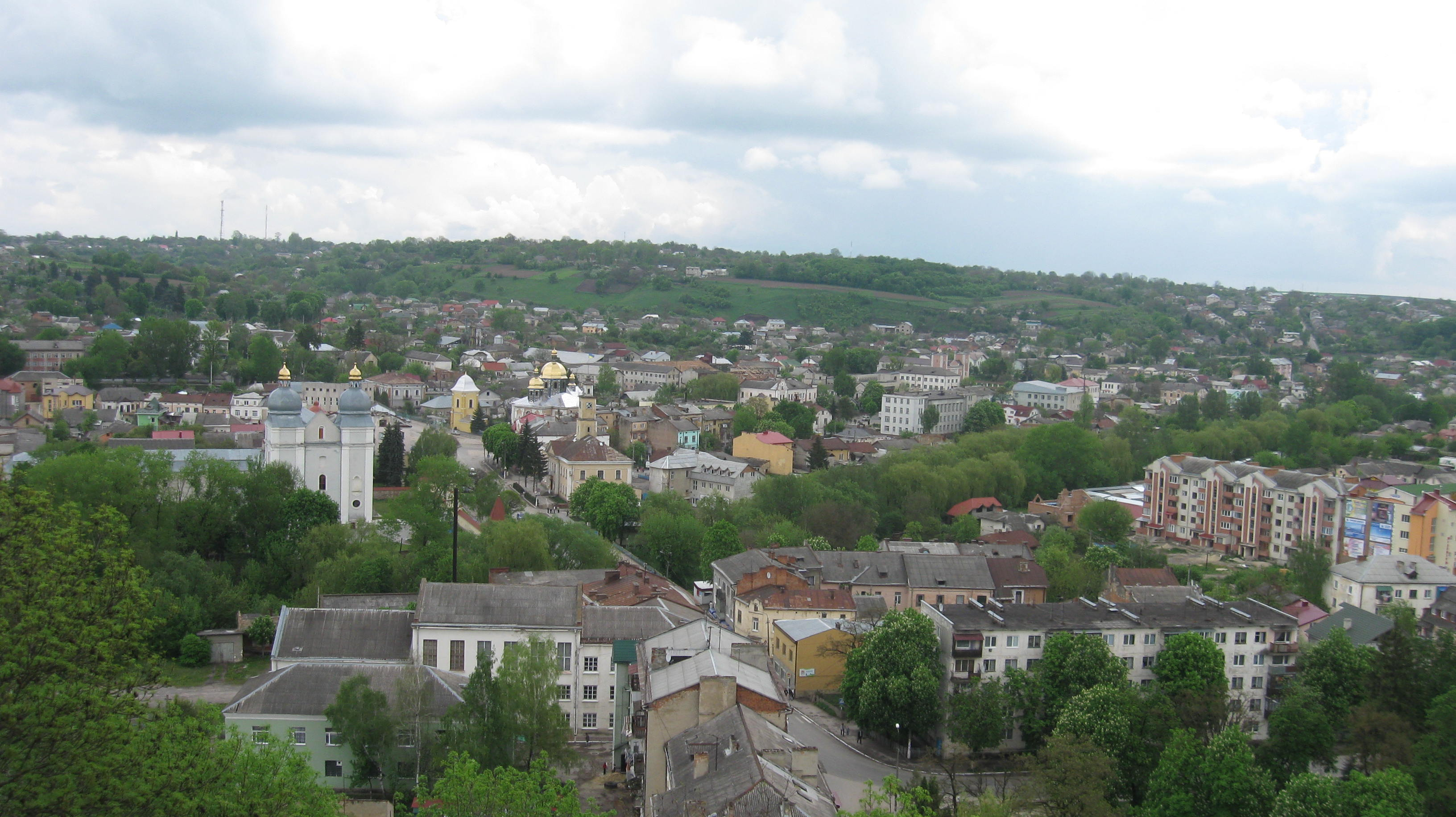
Terebovlia

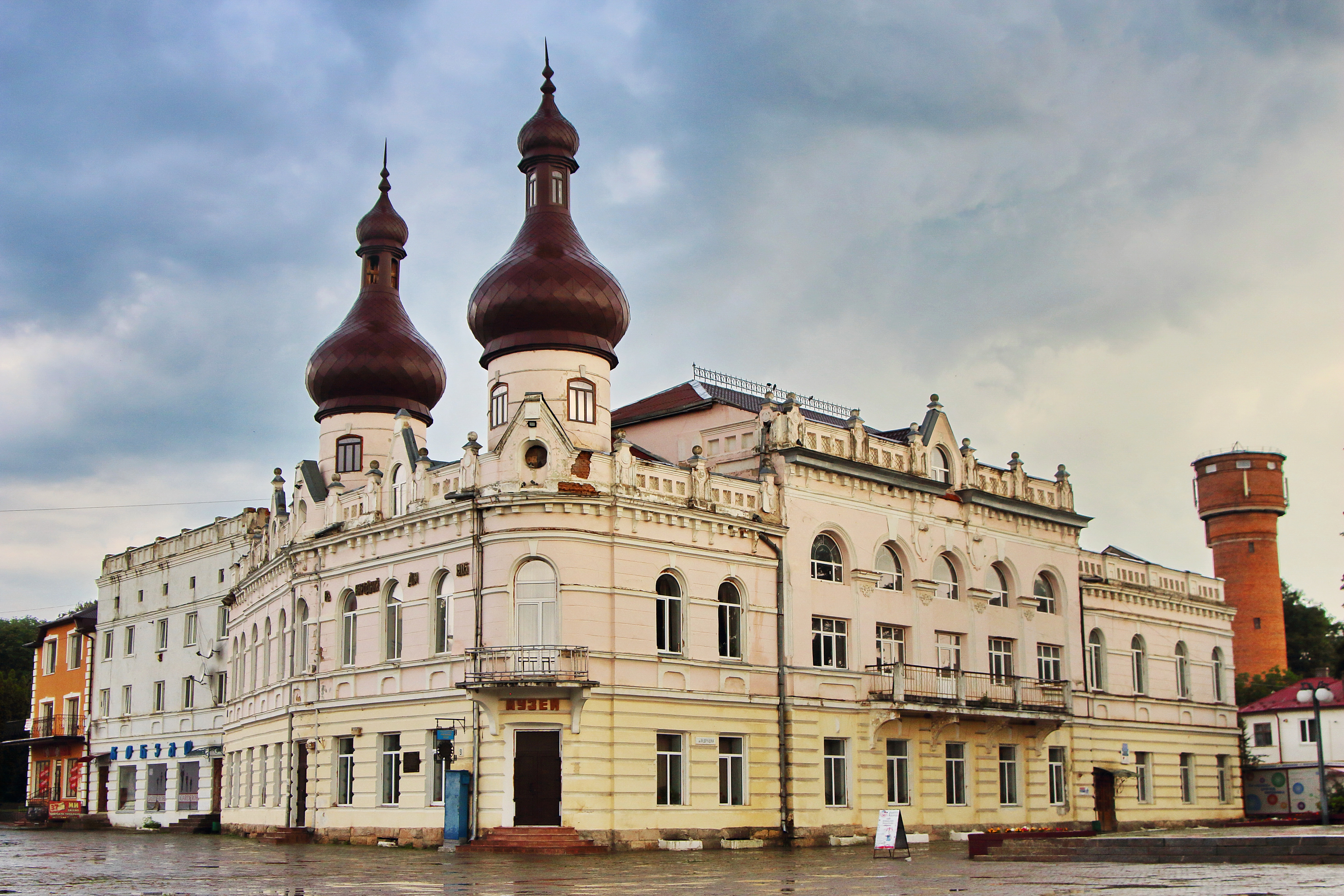
Borshchiv

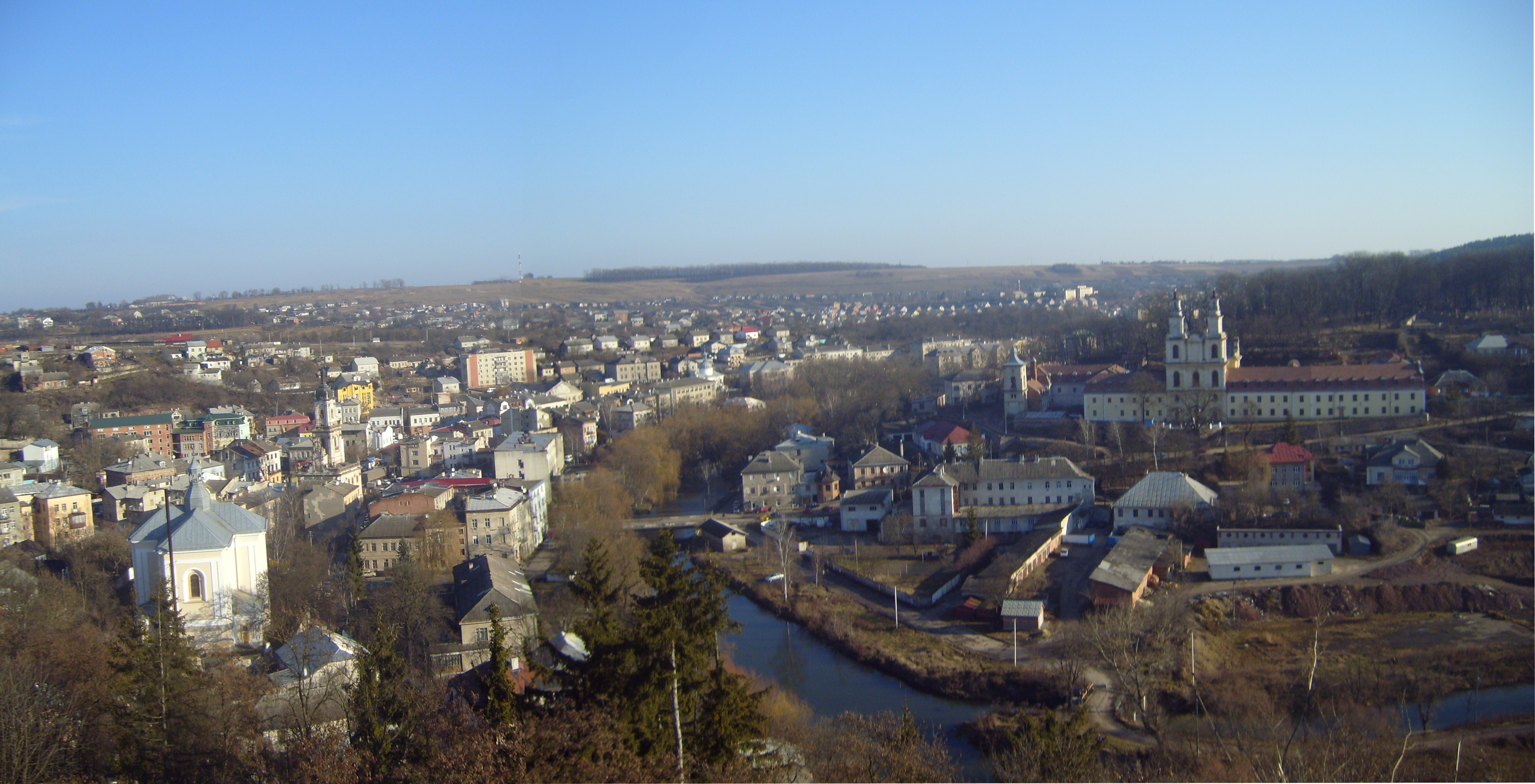
Buchach

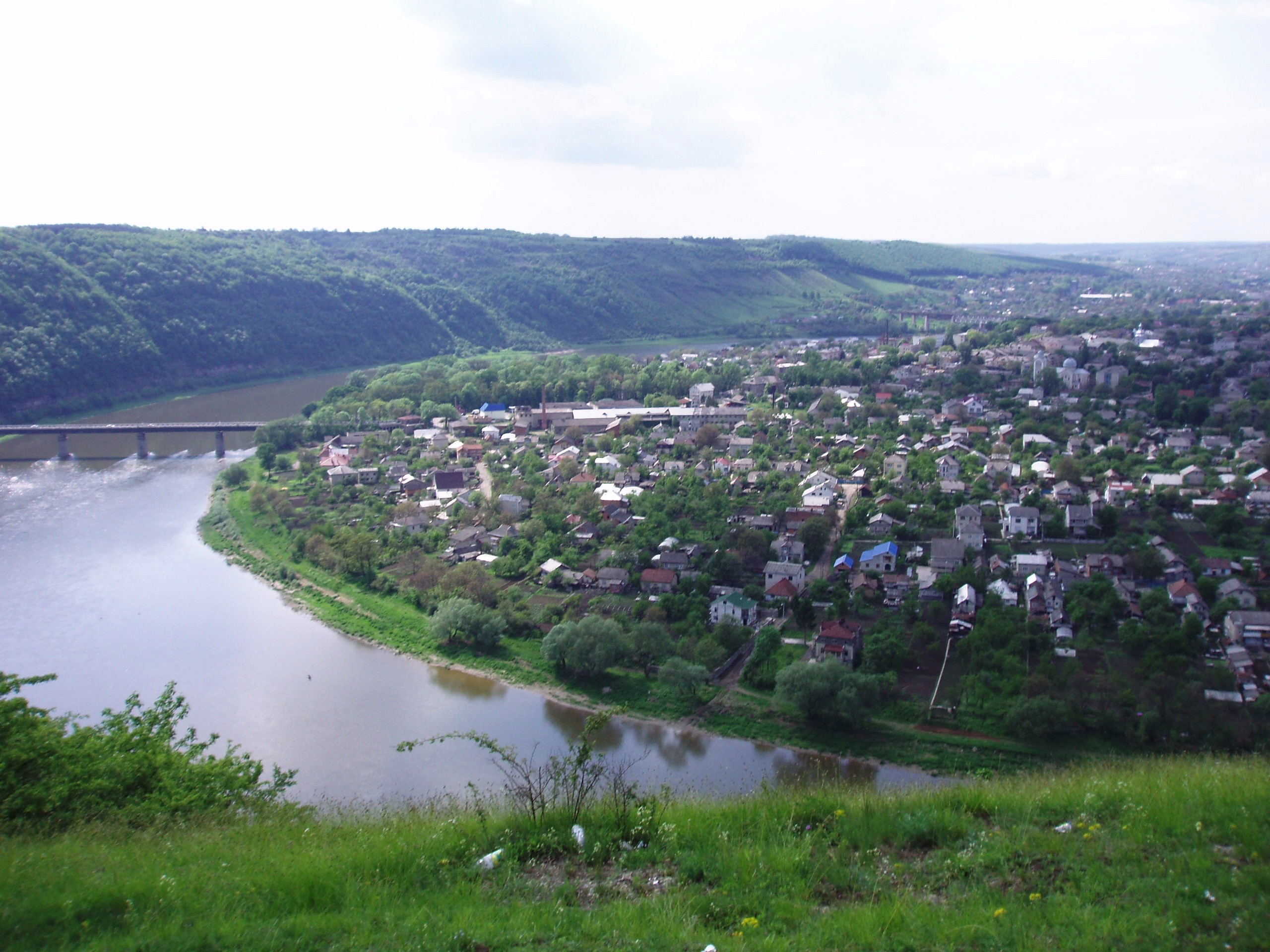
Zalishchyky

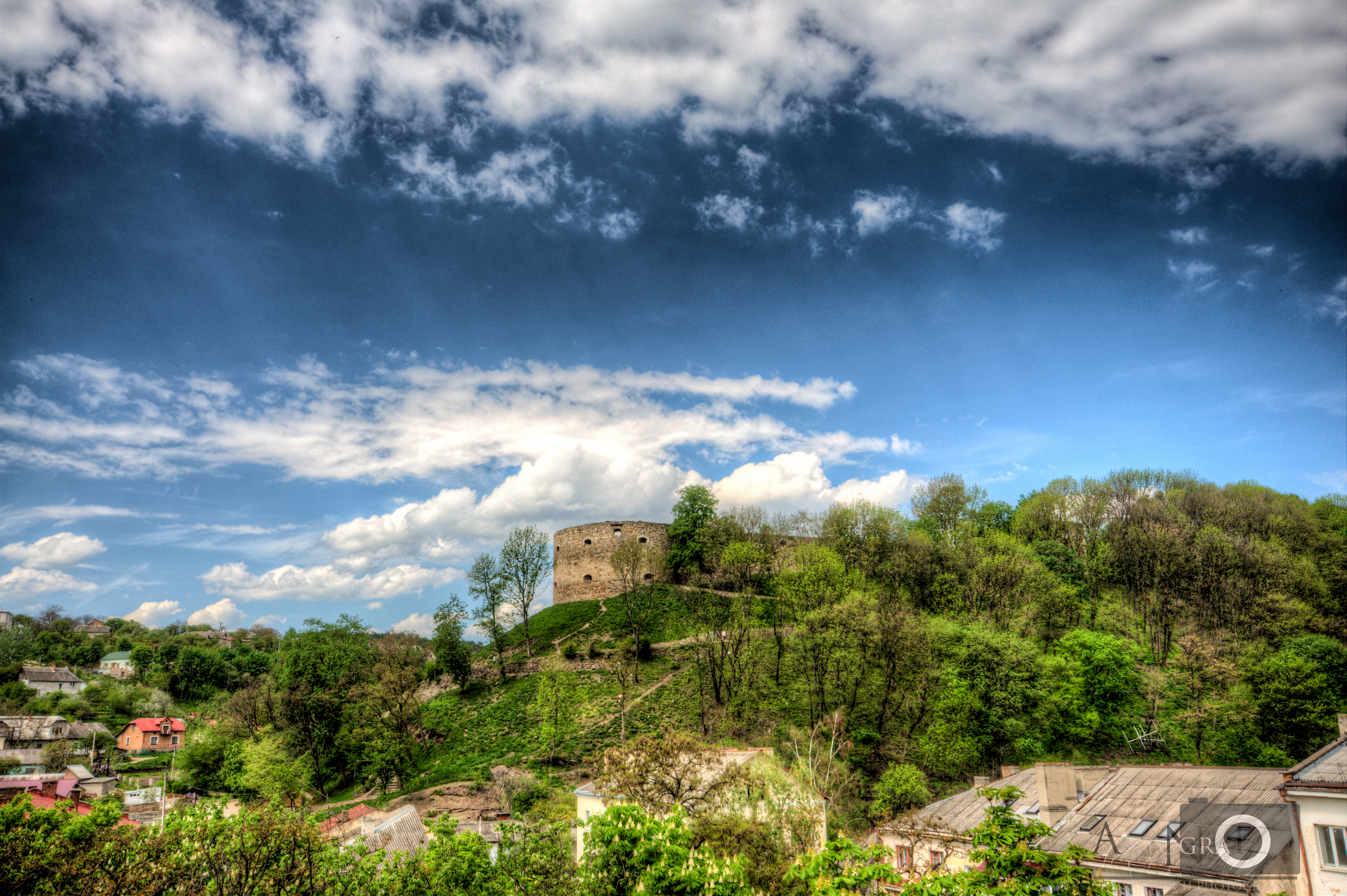
Terebovlia Castle

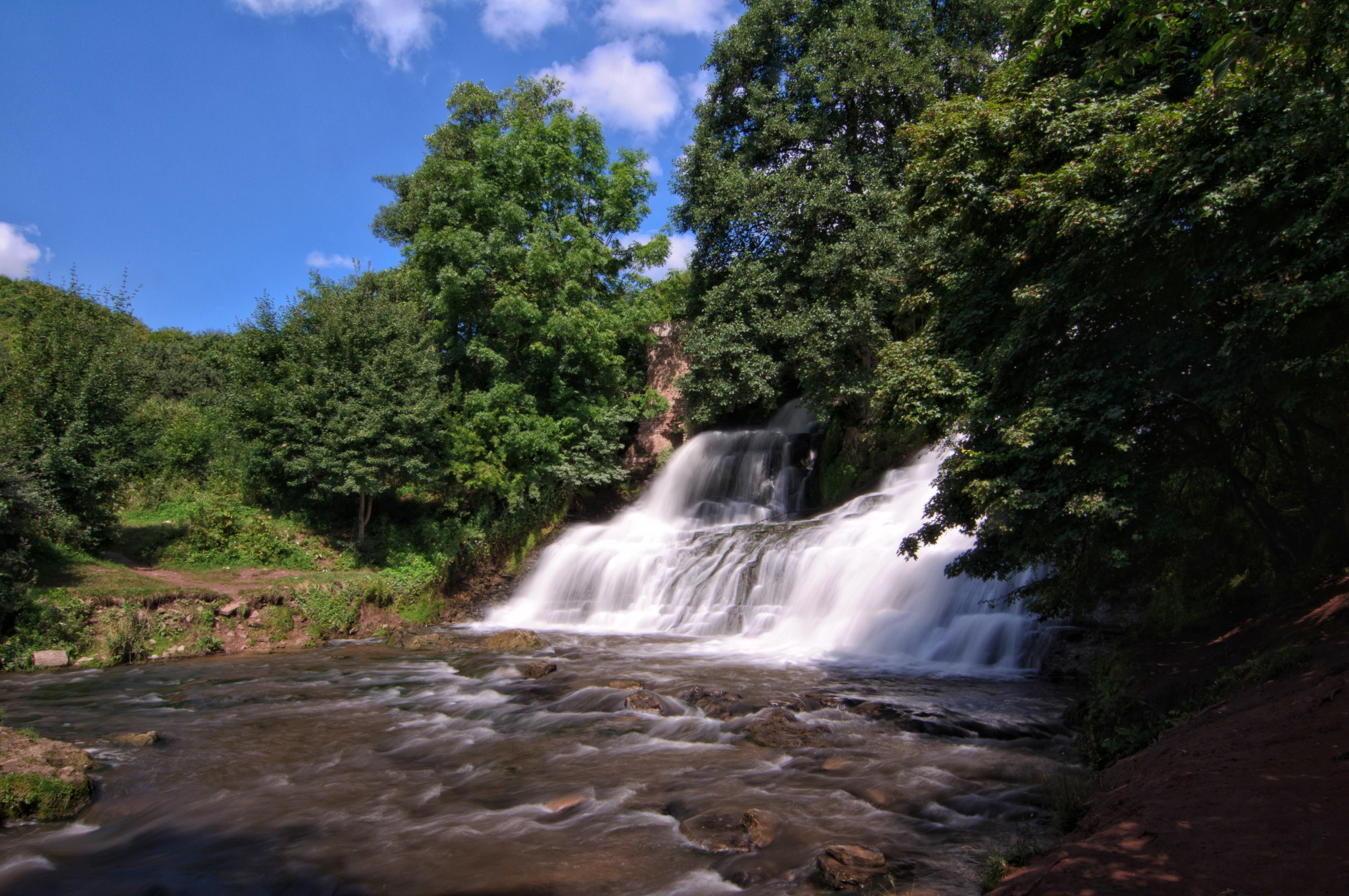
Dzhuryn Waterfall

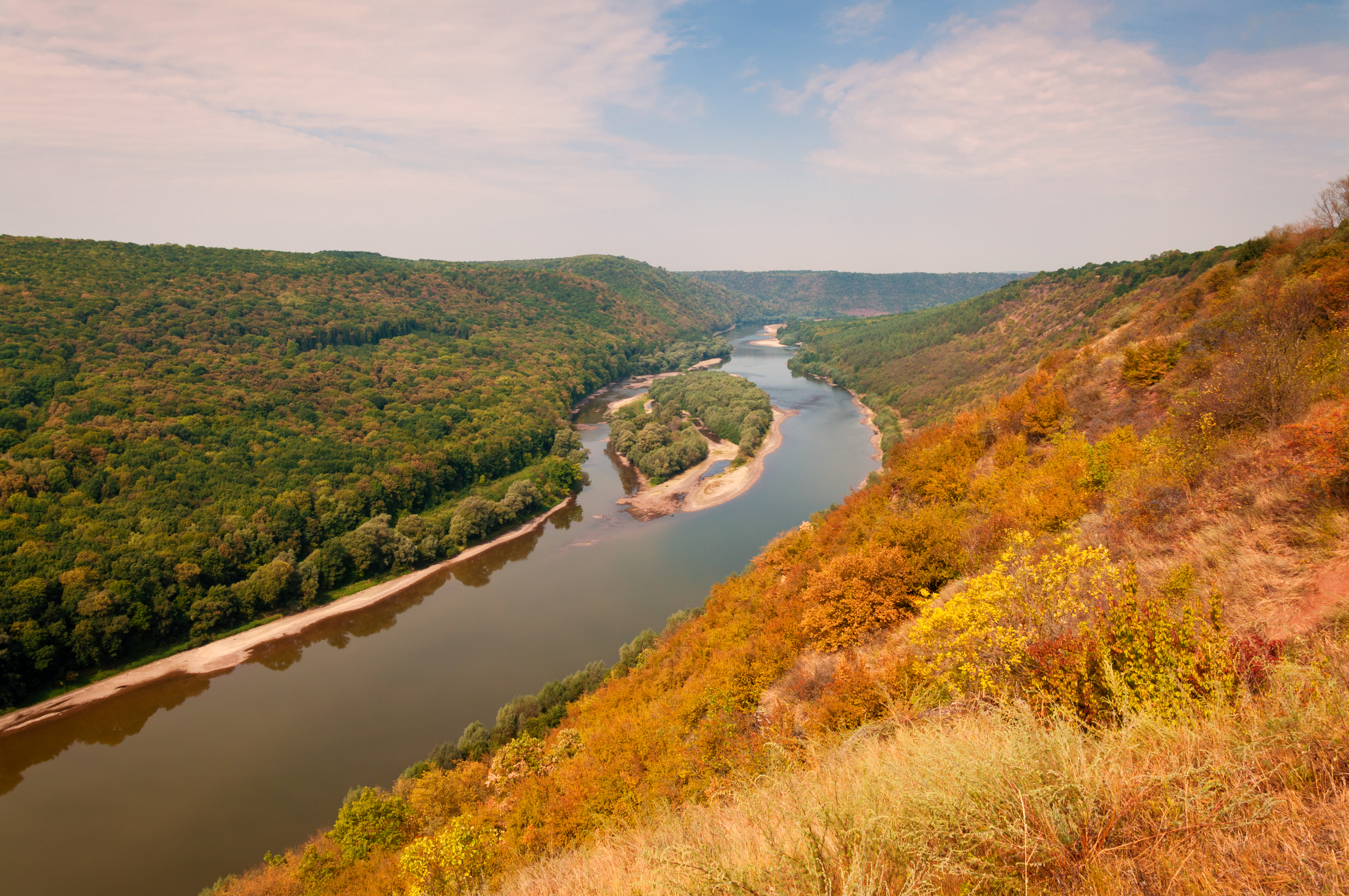
Dniester Canyon National Nature Park

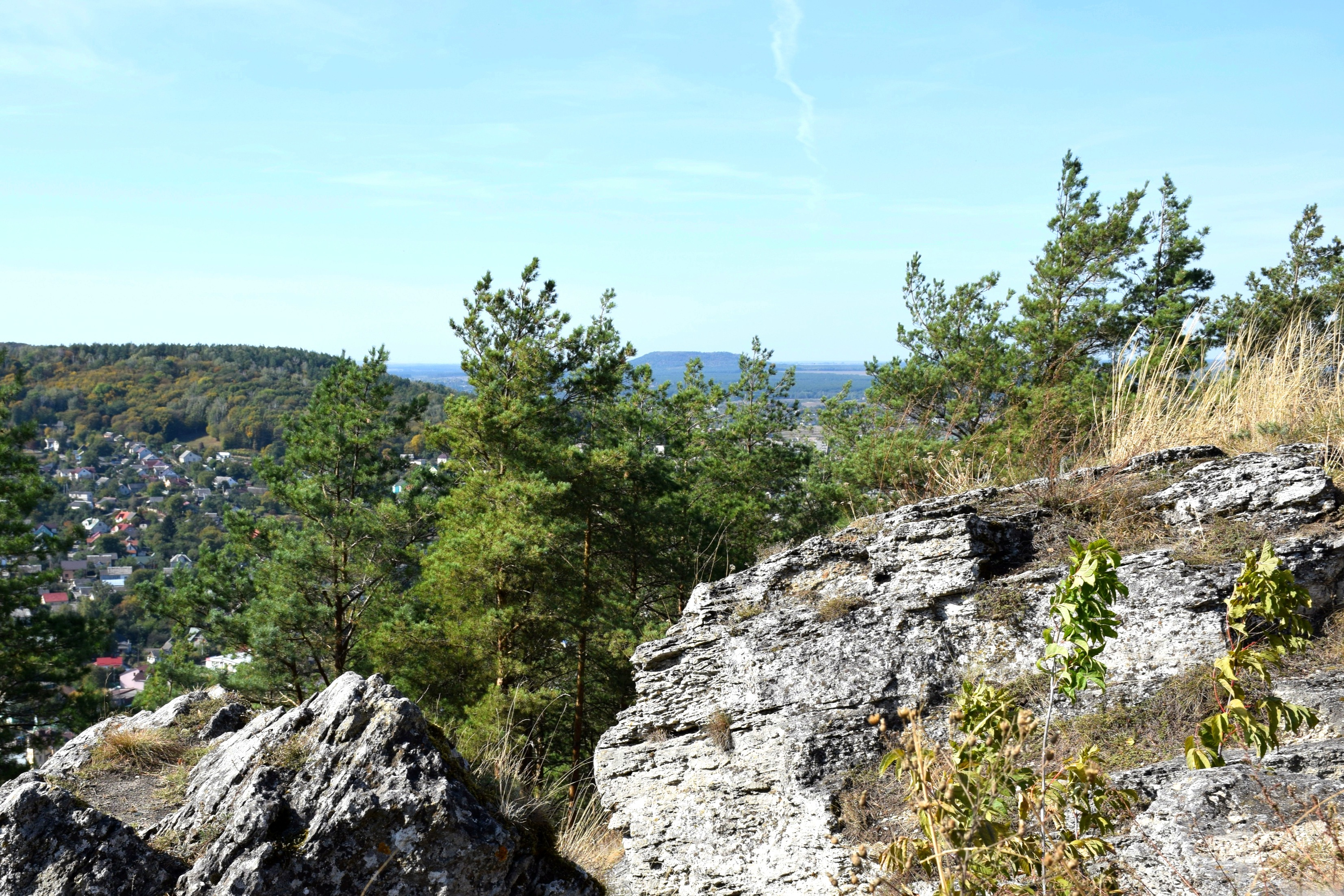
Kremenets Mountains National Nature Park

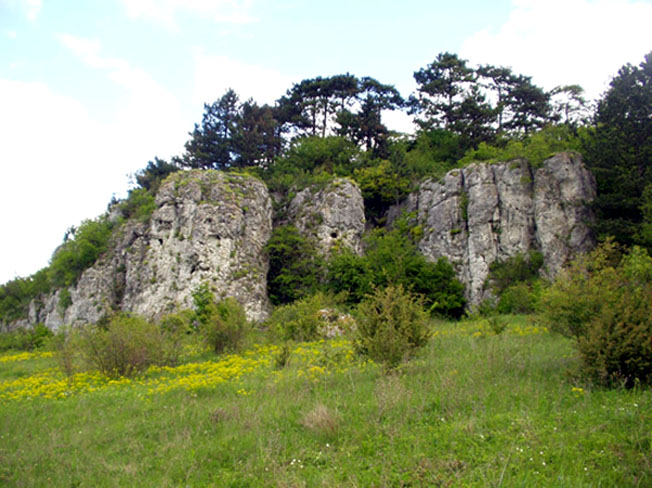
Medobory Nature Reserve

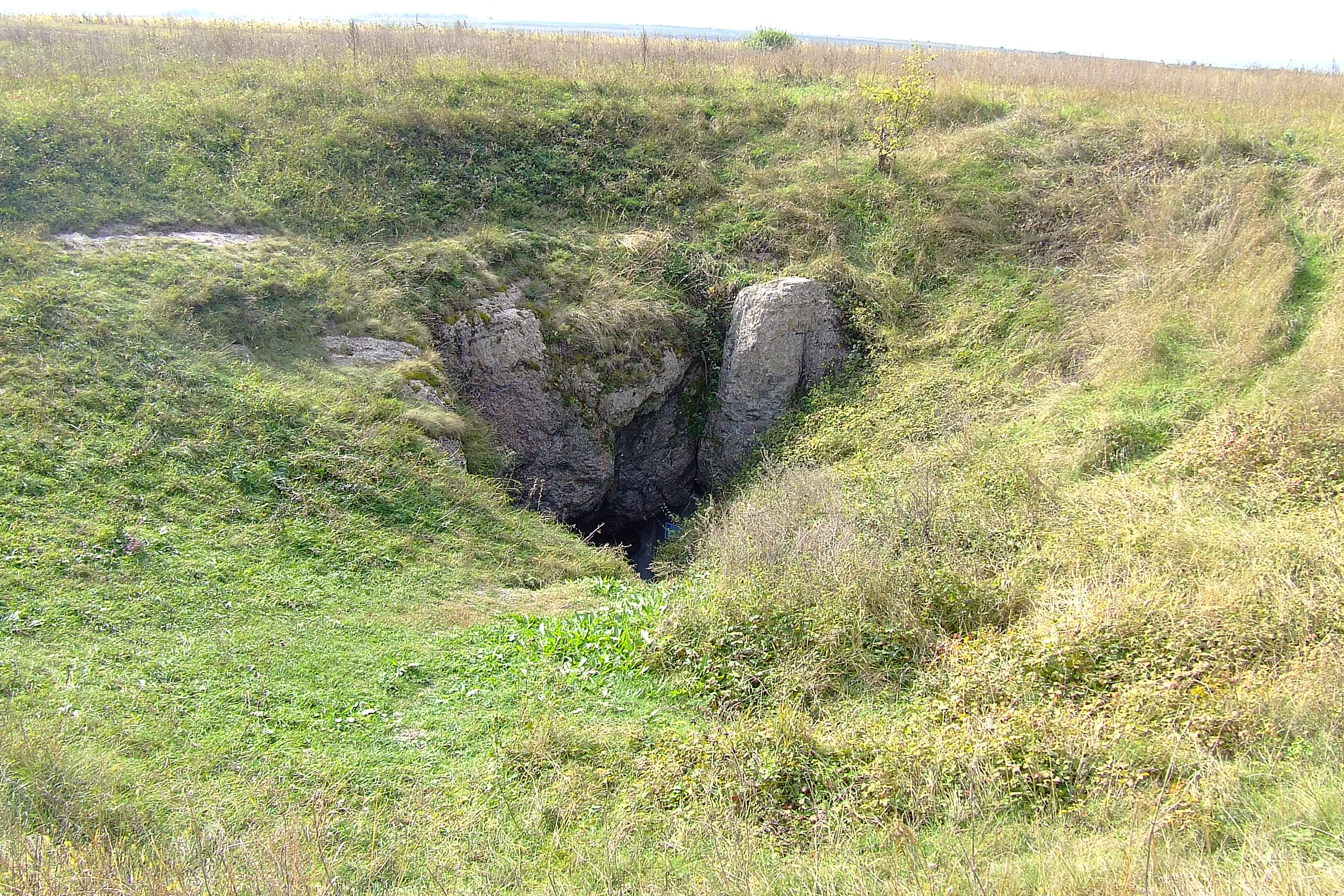
Entrance to Verteba Cave

== See also ==
- Subdivisions of Ukraine
- List of Canadian place names of Ukrainian origin
