= Yazlovets Castle =

Ruined castle in Ukraine

Coordinates: 48°57′27.2″N 25°26′20″E

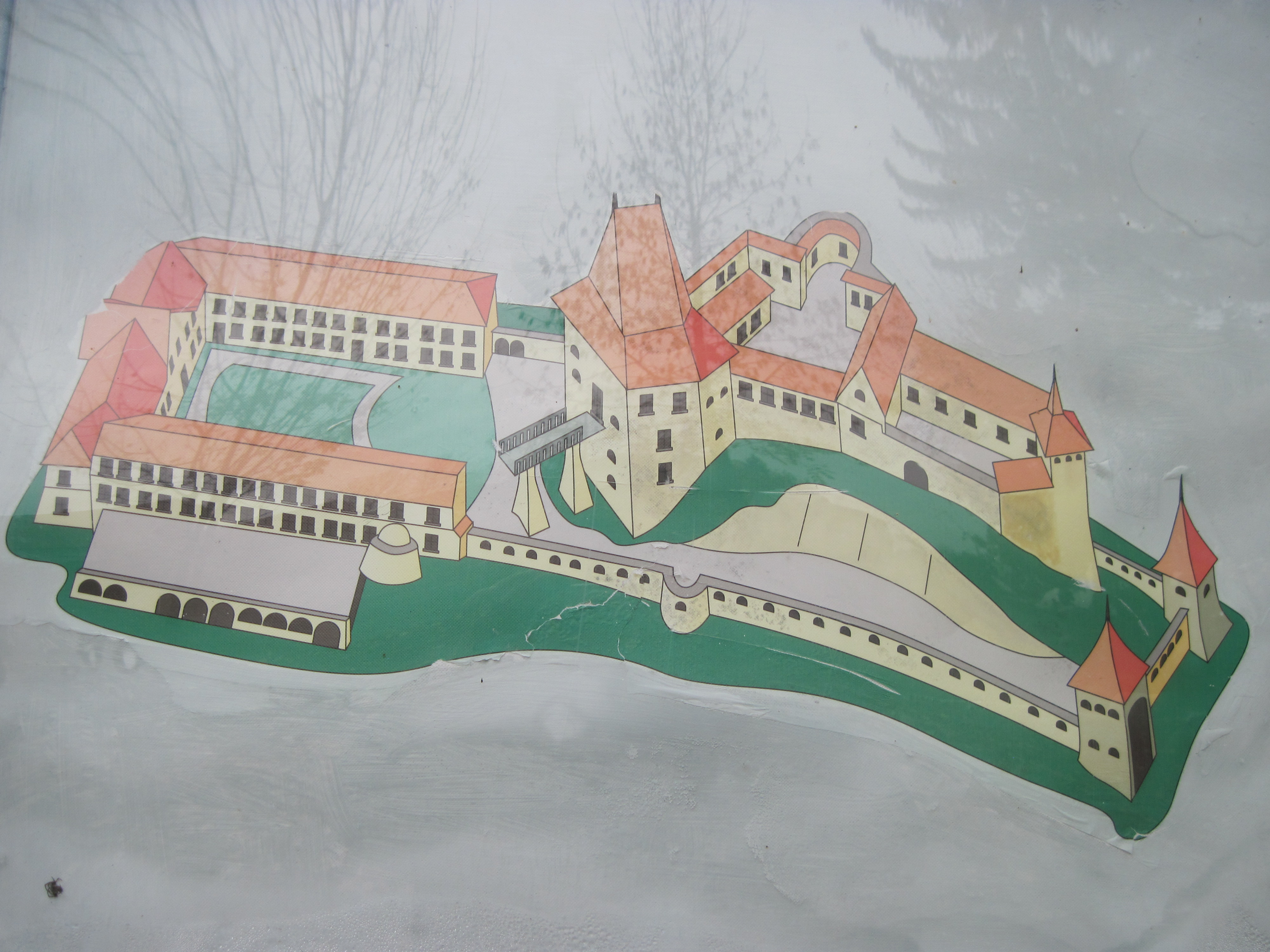
- Drawing of the castle

Site information
- Type: Castle

Site history
- Built: 14th century

Immovable Monument of National Significance of Ukraine
- Official name: Замок (Castle)
- Type: Architecture
- Reference no.: 190014

The Yazlovets Castle (Ukrainian: Язловецький замок, romanized: Yazlovets'kyi zamok) is the remnants of a ruined castle in the former privately owned town, now village, of Yazlovets, Chortkiv Raion, Ternopil Oblast, Ukraine.

== History ==
It originated in the 14th century province of Podolia in Red Ruthenia, as a fortress of the Buczacki noble family. In the 15th century, the town came under the Polish crown. In the 1500s the castle was rebuilt by Jerzy Jazłowiecki who was buried there. Between 1649 and 1658, Aleksander Koniecpolski had a new line of fortifications, the so-called "lower castle", erected around Jazłowiecki's keep. In 1684 it was involved in the Battle of Yazlovets, when king John III Sobieski used it as a prison for his Turkish and Moldovan captives. The town became part of the Ottoman Empire until the Treaty of Karlowitz in 1699, when it reverted to the Polish–Lithuanian Commonwealth for the next 73 years. After the first partition of Poland in 1772, Yazlovets became part of Galicia, soon to be the most neglected part of Austria-Hungary.

=== Classical palace ===
Ownership of the estate passed from Stanisław Koniecpolski to two generations of the Lubomirski family, who neglected it as their interests lay elsewhere, and after the death of Teodor Lubomirski in 1745, sold it on. In 1747, Stanisław Poniatowski converted the lower castle into a horseshoe shaped classical palace. After the Poniatowski family relinquished their ownership, at the end of the 18th century, it came into the possession of the Błażowski family. In 1863 Krzysztof Błażowski donated the crumbling palace and gardens to the Sisters of the Immaculate Conception order, for the establishment of a girls catholic secondary boarding school, Jazłowiec College, which continued, with interruptions for wars, until the Invasion of Poland in September 1939. From November 1918, the estate was briefly under the administration of the Ukrainian People's Republic until the summer of 1919 when it came under the aegis of newly independent Poland. The Sisters hung on in the property during World War II, despite two of them becoming the victims of murder by Ukrainian nationalists. In 1945 the entire estate came under the Soviet Union and the order of nuns was finally expelled from the region in 1946.

After the war, the classical palace was variously a prison, a garrison and a sanatorium. In the 1990s the Immaculate Conception Sisters were allowed to return to one wing of their former property, to run a retreat centre and a sanctuary for their foundress, Blessed Marcelina Darowska, who is buried in the palace. Currently, the castle is managed by the Castles of Ternopil Oblast National Reserve.

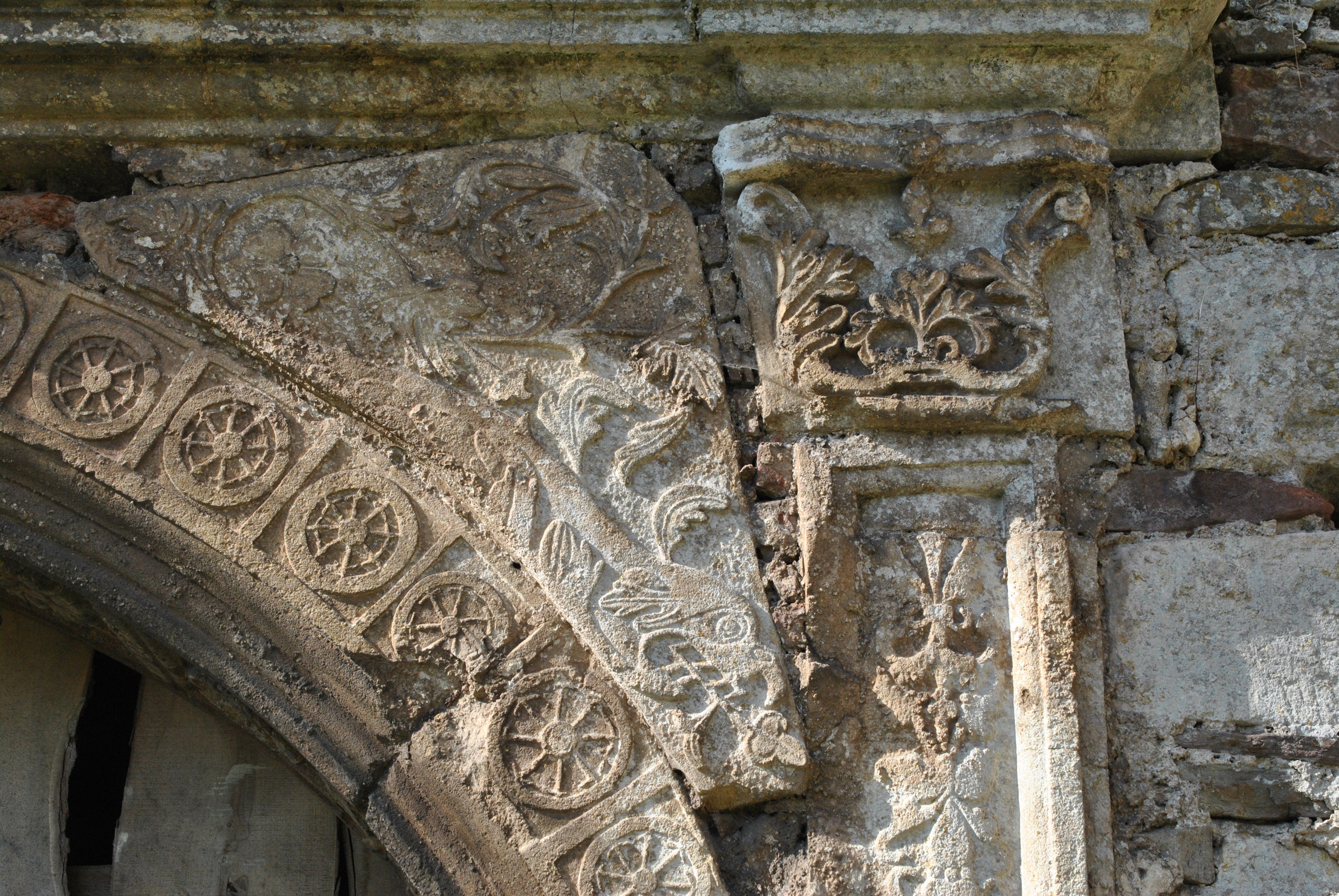

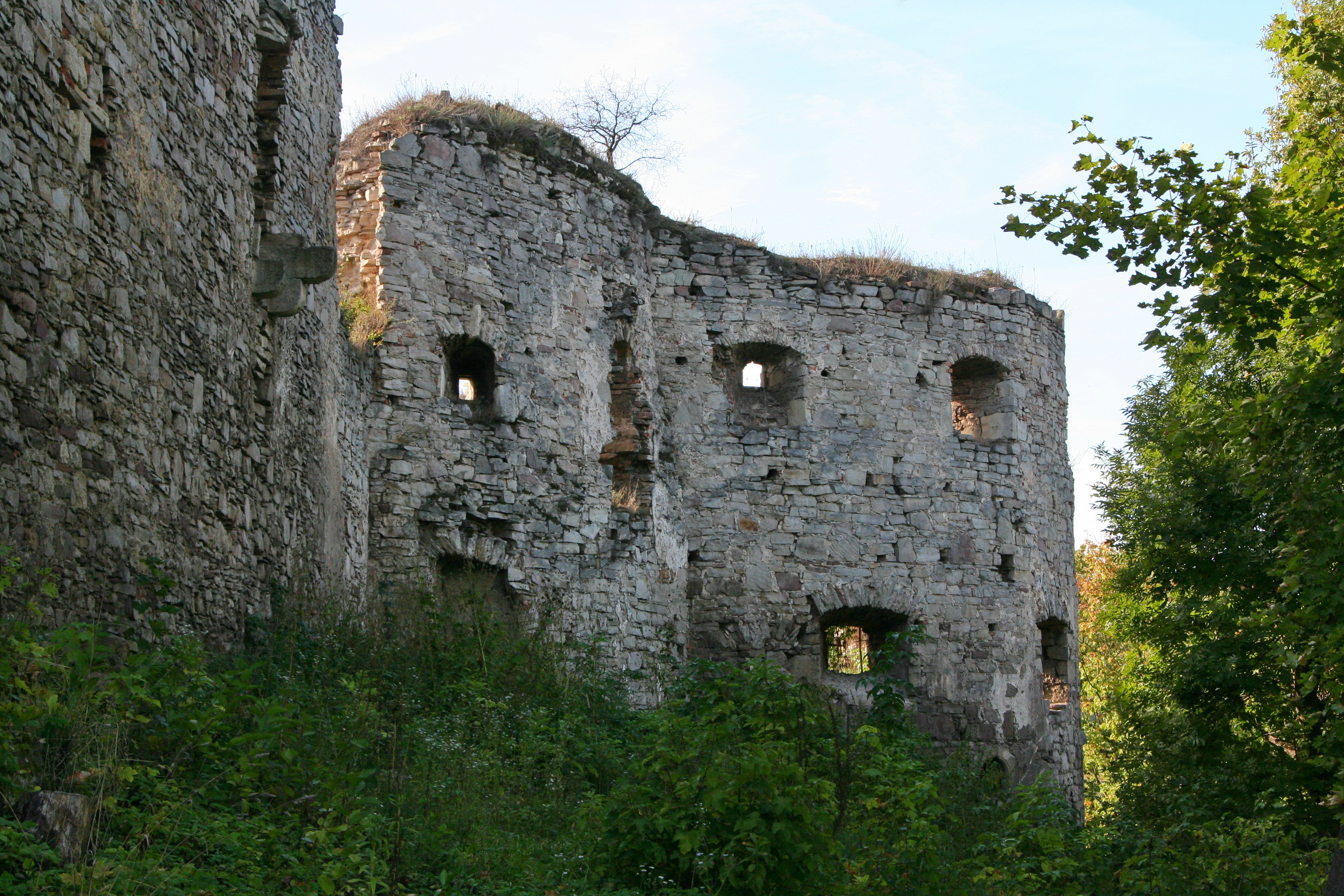
A tower

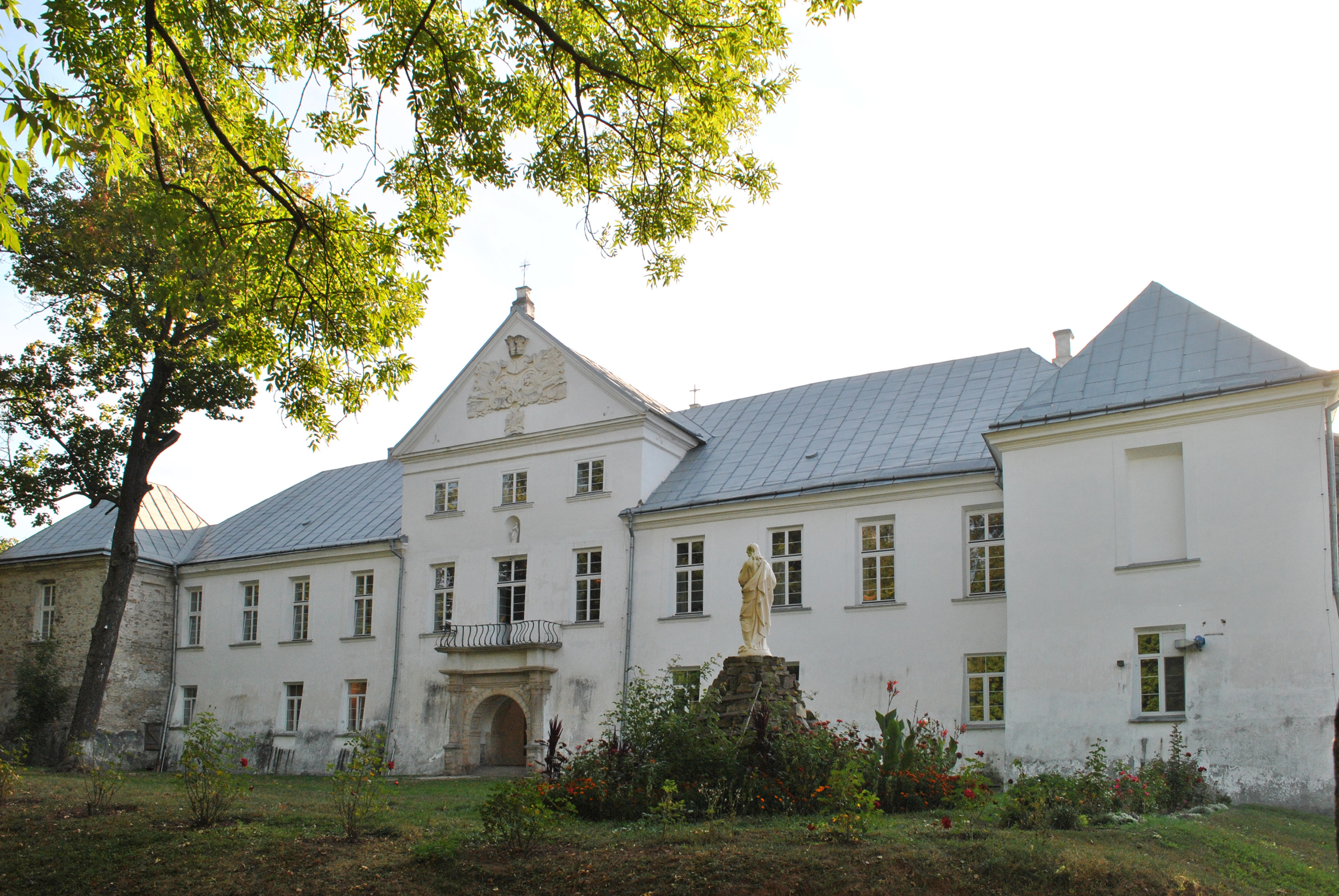
The palace

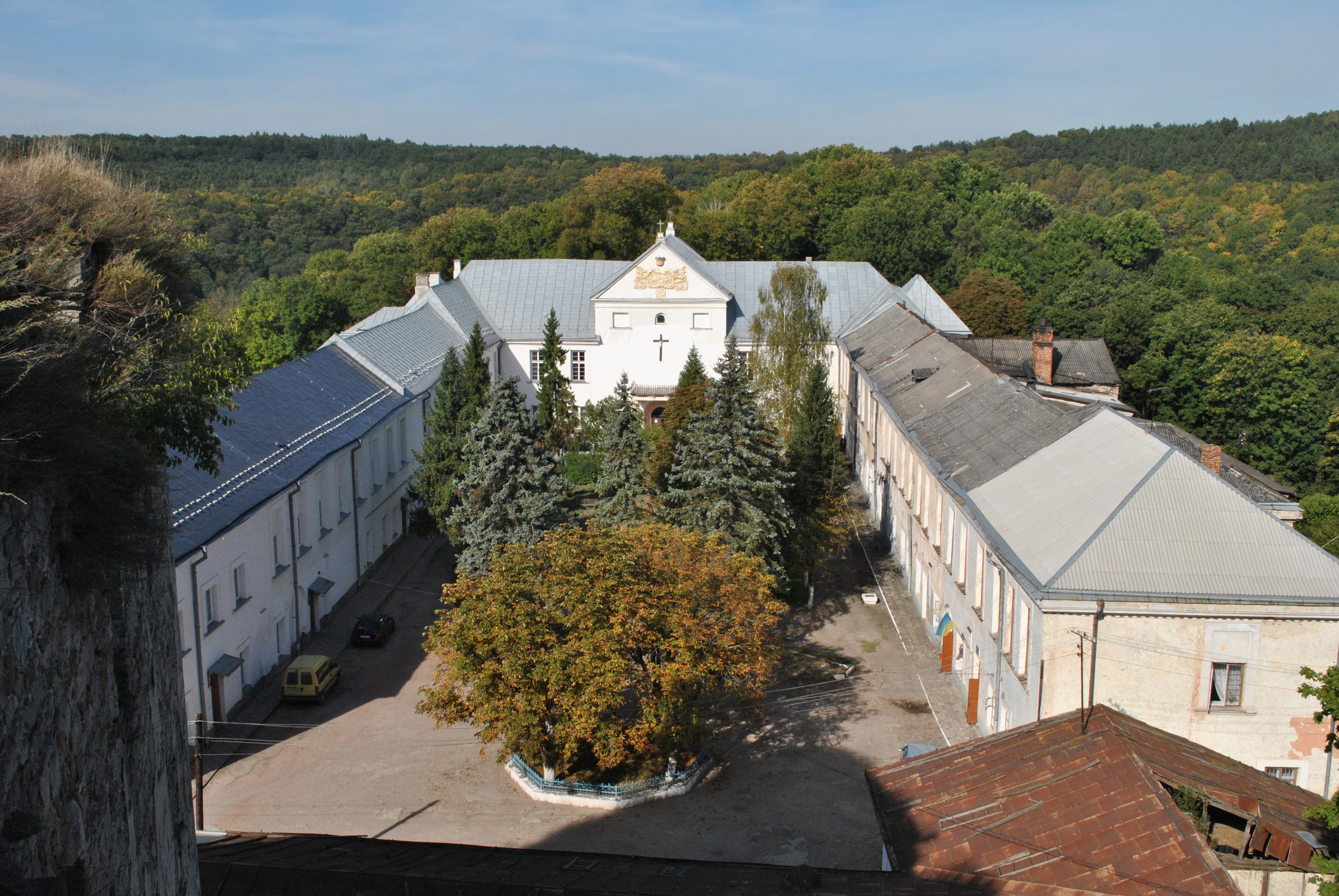

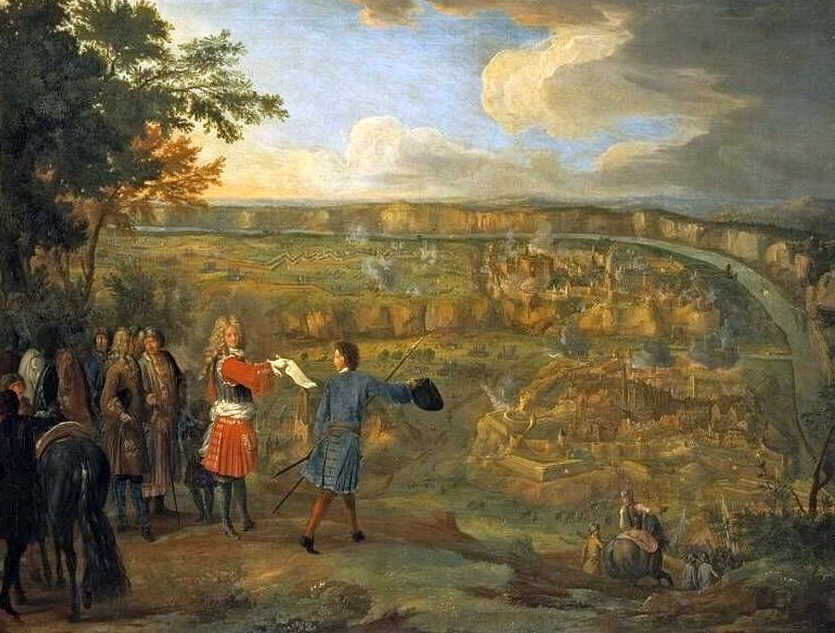
Battle of Yazlovets, 1684. Martin
