= Yazlovets =

Historic village in Ukraine

Yazlovets Язловець
- Village
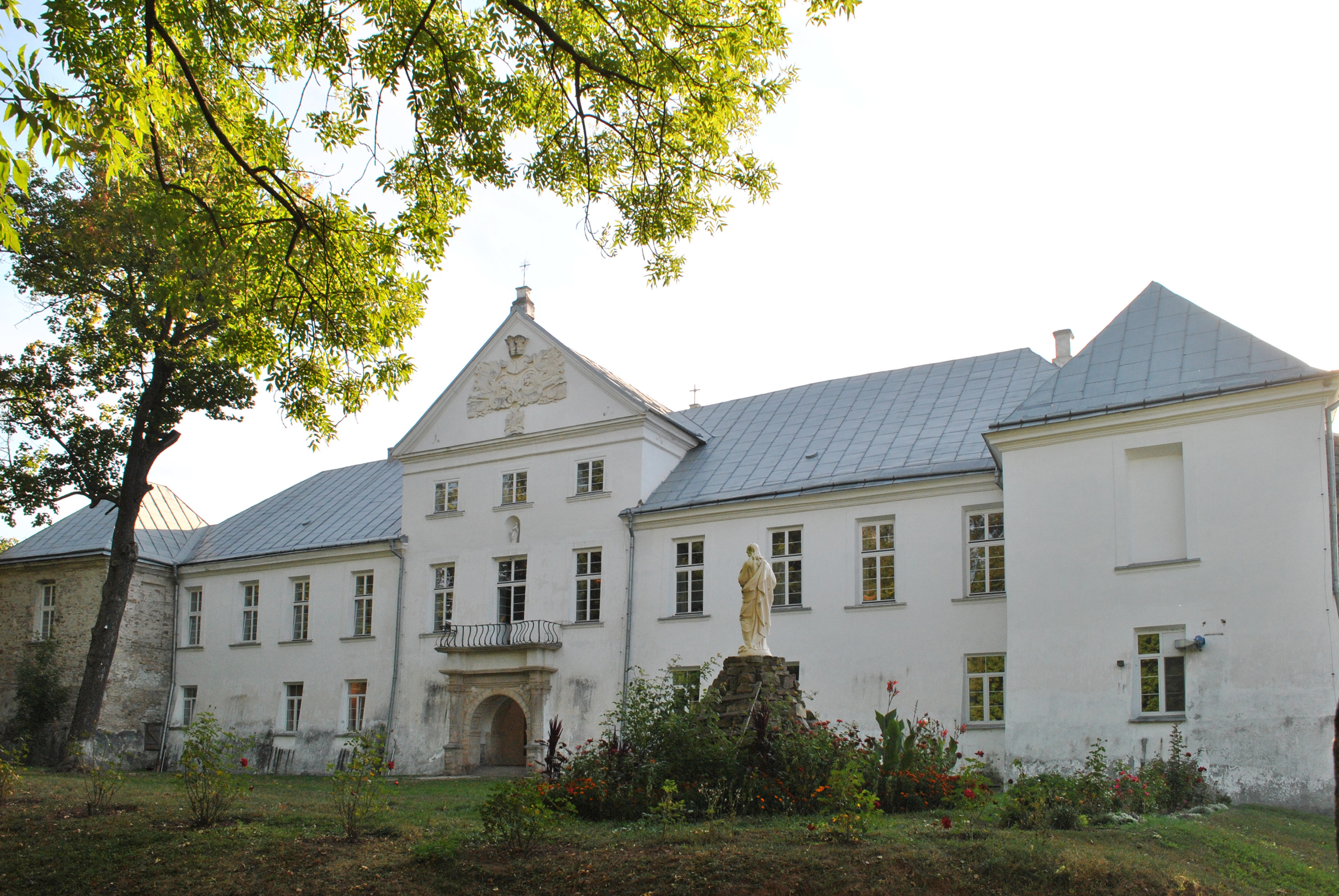
- The palace

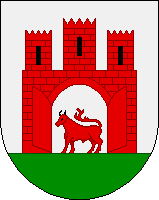
- Coat of arms

- Location of Yazlovets in Ternopil Oblast Yazlovets (Ukraine)
- Coordinates: 48°57′41″N 25°26′42″E
- Country: Ukraine
- Oblast: Ternopil Oblast
- District: Chortkiv Raion
- First mentioned: 15th century

Population
  - Total: 450
- Time zone: UTC+2 (EET)
  - Summer (DST): UTC+3 (EEST)

Yazlovets (Ukrainian: Язловець, romanized: Yazlovets; Polish: Jazłowiec) is a village in Chortkiv Raion, Ternopil Oblast, Ukraine. It is a Catholic pilgrimage centre of local significance. The village belongs to the Buchach urban hromada. It lies on the Vilchivchik river, a tributary of the Strypa and is located 16 km south of Buchach and presently has around 600 inhabitants. From 1947-91, it was known as Yablunivka. Apart from the ruined fortifications, there is little sign now that in the 15th and 16th centuries this was a thriving trading centre, on major international mercantile routes between the Black Sea and Northern Europe, and host to multiple merchant families of diverse ethnicities and religions. It was an instance of a privately owned settlement, such as was Zamość in Poland. The city's square has been entirely obliterated.

== History ==
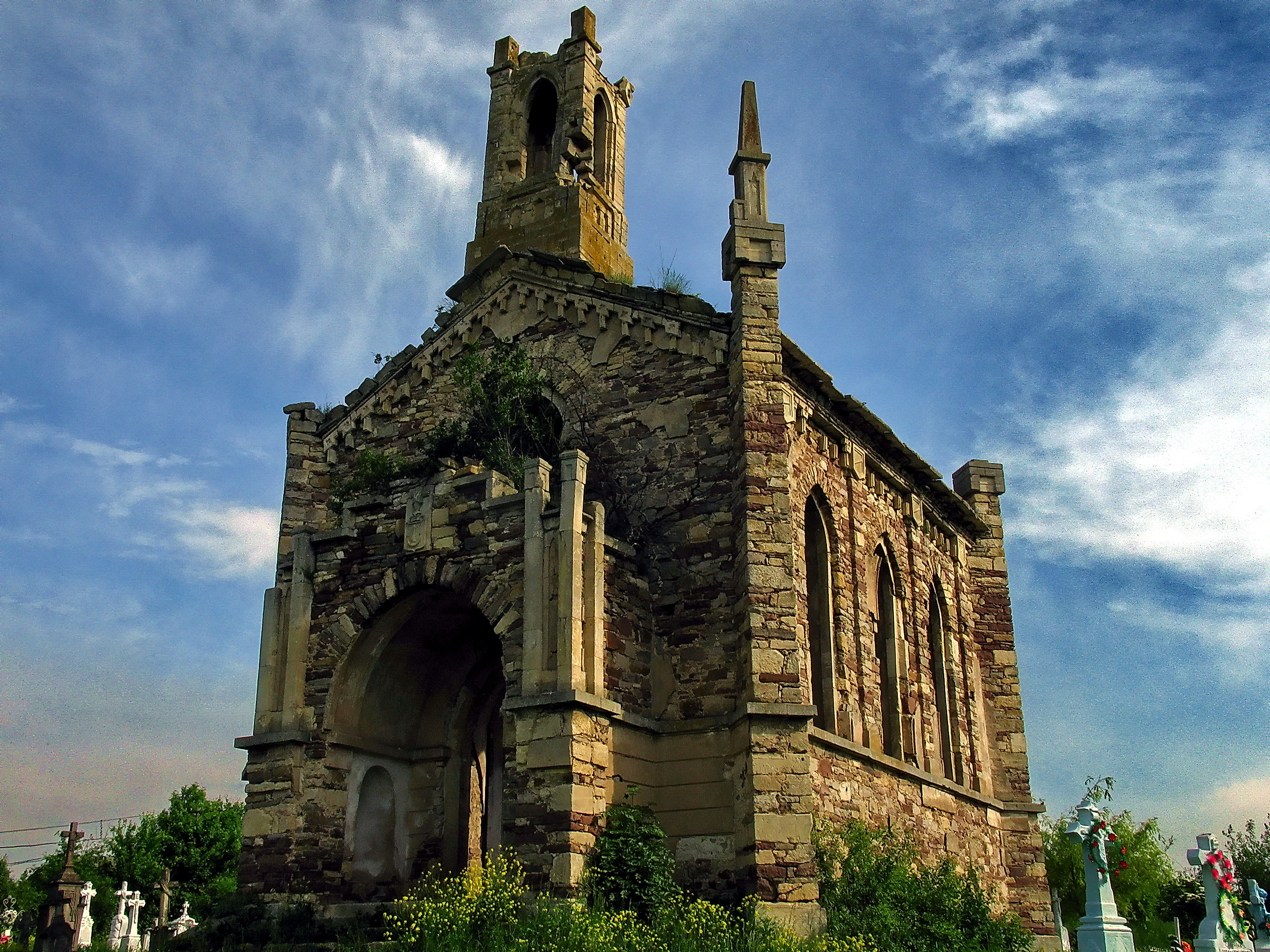
Catholic chapel of the Assumption of the Blessed Virgin Mary

From 1340 until the first partition of Poland (1772), Jazłowiec belonged to the Kingdom of Poland, as part of Red Ruthenia and was later absorbed within the Polish–Lithuanian Commonwealth, before it was annexed by the Austrian Empire and returning to Poland in 1918 until the 1939 simultaneous invasion and partition of Poland by Soviet and Nazi German rule. In 1946 it was part of the Soviet Union and since 1991 it has been in Ukraine.

The earliest written record of Jazłowiec, or Yazlovets, dates from the 15th century, as the property of the Jazłowiecki szlachta family, a branch of the Buczacki family from the neighbouring town of Buczacz. In 1406 king Władysław II Jagiełło presented Jazłowiec to starosta Dziersław Konopka, who under pressure from the Grand Duchy of Lithuania, in the person of Grand Duke Vytautas the Great, ceded the domain to Teodoric Buczacki Jazłowiecki. According to other sources, Jazłowiec passed in 1417 into the possession of the Buczacki family. The owners of Yazlovets are noted in history for their contribution to the defence of Christendom against Turkish invasions. The fortress whose extensive remnants dominate the village, was erected in the 16th century by the Protestant Jerzy Jazłowiecki, later extended by his Catholic son, Mikołaj Jazłowiecki. From at least the 17th century, Jazłowiec had its own Jewish community which lasted until The Holocaust.

=== Armenian centre ===
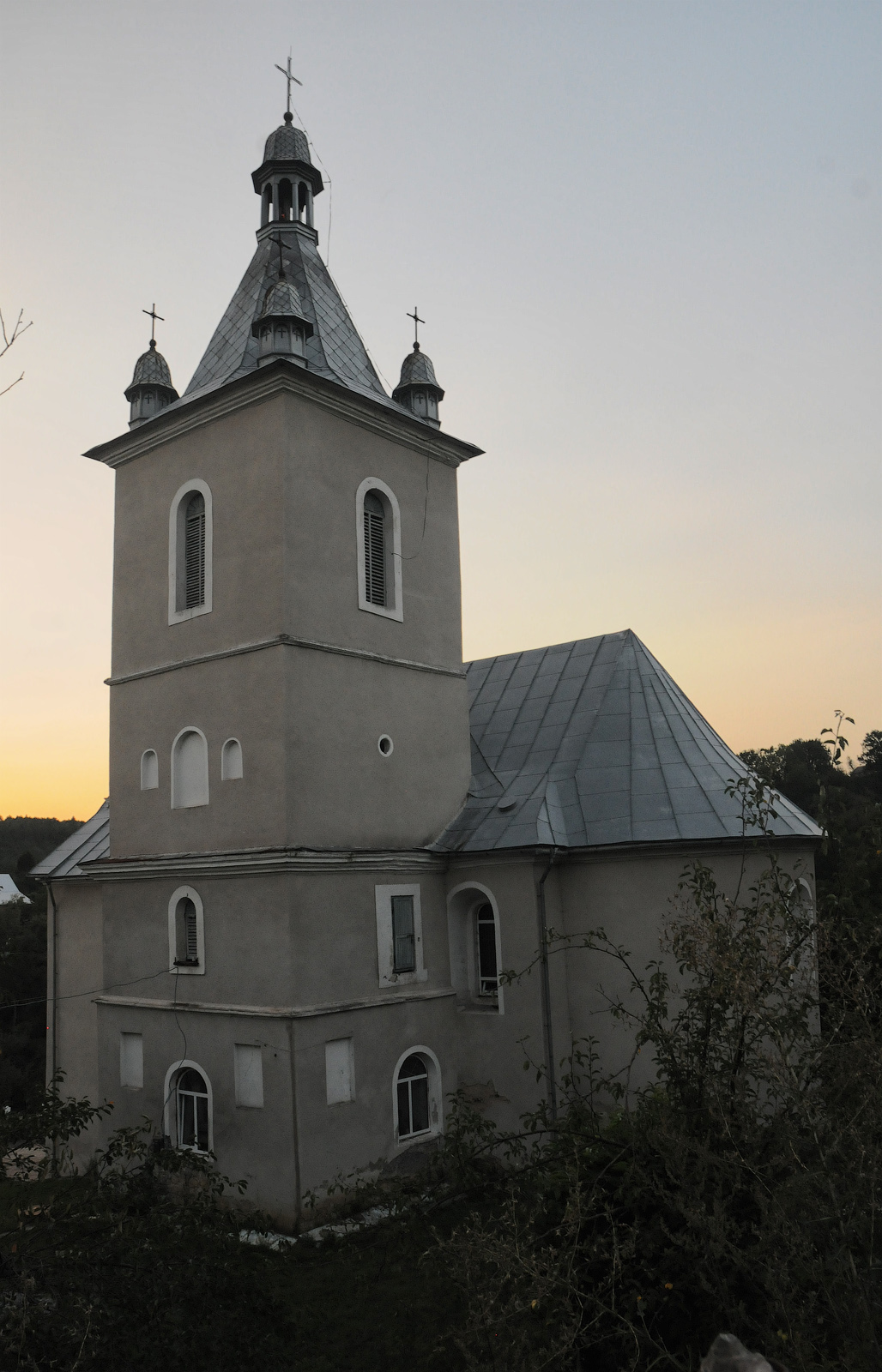
Orthodox (originally Armenian cathedral) Church of Saint Nicholas

During the 16th century, a stone church dedicated to the Assumption of the Blessed Virgin Mary and a monastery of the Dominican Order were built. In 1615 the Jazlowiecki family issued privileges encouraging Armenian refugees from Crimea to settle in the town, as happened in Kamieniec Podolski (now Kamianets-Podilskyi), since the community brought in increased trade and hence income to the locality. Next to the city of Lwów, Jazłowiec became temporarily the second bishopric of the Armenian community in Poland. By 1708 Jazłowiec was the centre of several different religious vicariates. There were: the Catholic church of the Nativity, the Armenian church of Saint Nicholas and the Orthodox church of Saint Elias.

1644-1659 saw the extension of the fortress by Hetman Stanisław Koniecpolski and his son, Aleksander, to whom the Sejm of 1658 granted the right of collecting customs charges for maintaining an armed garrison.

=== Ottoman rule ===
The town's prosperity lasted until 1672, when it was captured and occupied by the Ottomans for ten years, (see Polish–Ottoman War (1672–76)). It was nominally ruled by Ottomans between 1684-1699 and contested by Poles and Turks during this period. Administratively, it became a Sanjak known as "Yazlofça" in the Podolia Eyalet of the Ottoman Empire, under the nahiyahs of Yazlofça, Çortkuv and Kaşperofça. Jazłowiec returned to Poland after the Treaty of Karlowitz in 1699.

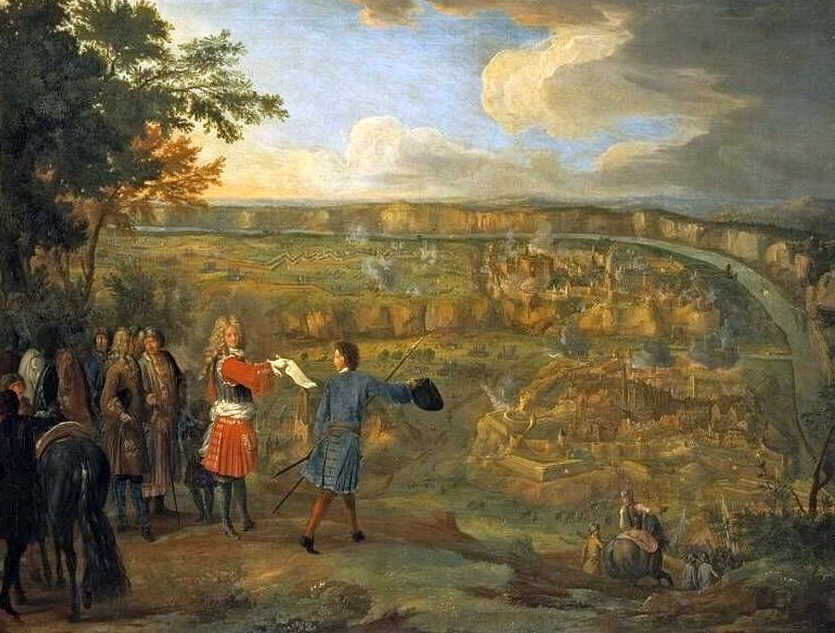
Pierre Martin Battle of Yazlovets, 1684

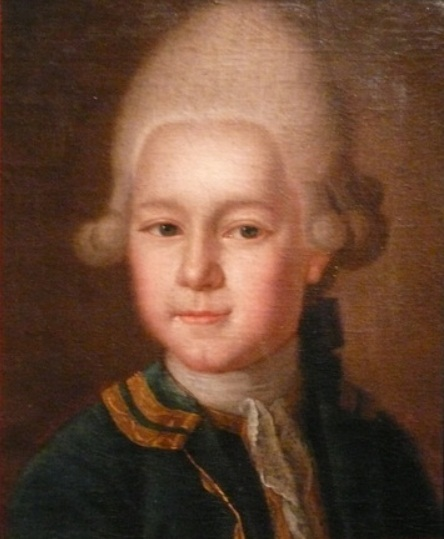
Stanisław Poniatowski, aged 14

In 1718, the Pauline Fathers were invited to the town. In 1746 the town was acquired by Stanisław Poniatowski who built the extant palace on the lower ramparts of the fortress and probably used them as building material for his elegant project. For the next thirty years it was the seat of the Poniatowski family and was the place where the future and last elected monarch of the Republic of Two Nations, Stanisław August Poniatowski, spent part of his childhood. In 1766, as the then king and owner of the town, Stanisław August Poniatowski confirmed the town's rights as had been conferred earlier by his father and older brother. In 1772, the town was politically "detached" from Poland, and occupied under Austrian rule, the policies of Emperor Joseph II led to the closure of both monasteries. In 1810, the ruined Armenian church was restored and given to the town's Ukrainian community and consecrated to Saint Nicholas. The palace and its estate changed hands several times in the early part of the 19th century.

=== Jewish community ===
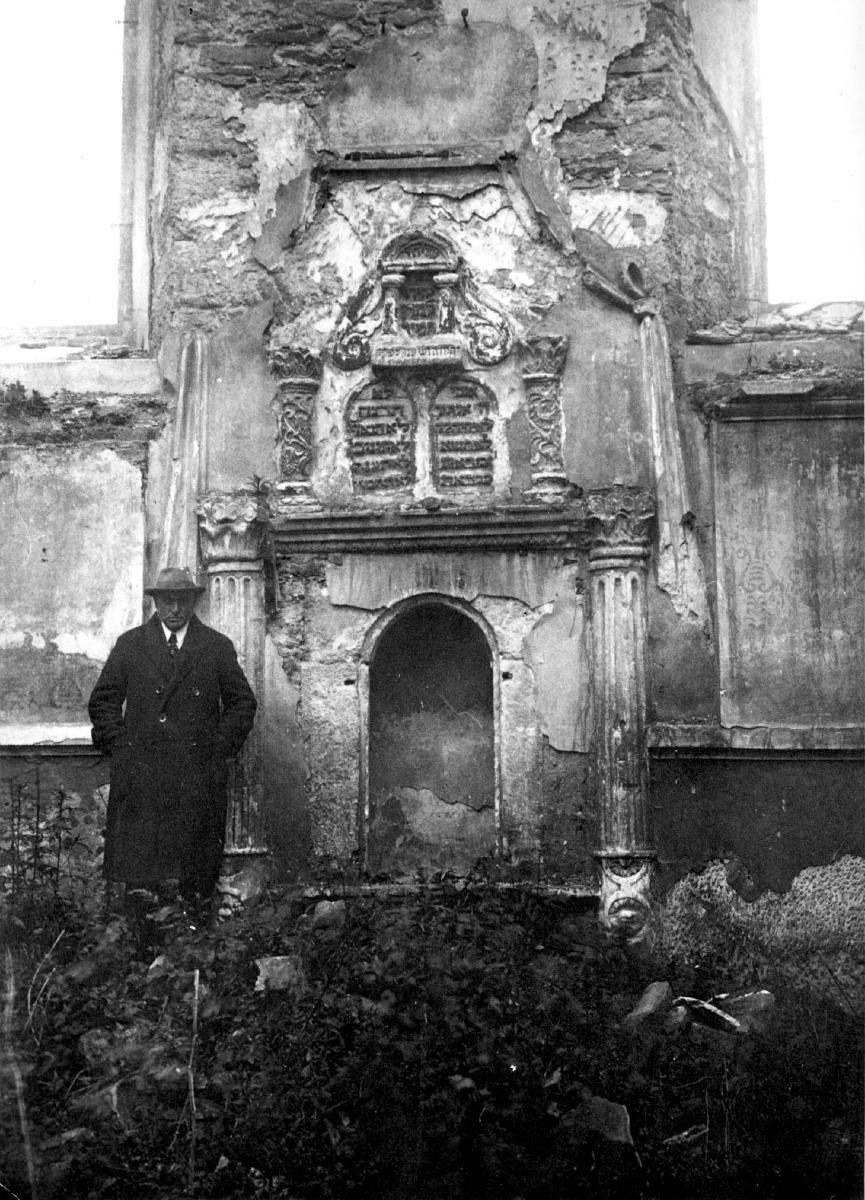
Jazłowiec (Yazlovets), ruins of the Synagogue

The nearby fortified town of Buczacz, 13 kilometres to the north of Jazłowiec, was an important centre of Jewish life and scholarship for four centuries or more, since 1572. Jazłowiec's own community dates its Jewish cemetery to the 18th century. Under Galicia, in 1880, the population of the town's Jews had risen to 1,642. After the conflicts and border changes of the early 20th century, it had fallen in 1921 to 474. In 1941 the Germans invaded the Soviet partition of Poland. A ghetto had been established in Buczacz in 1942. In November of that year, about 8,000 Jews from surrounding townships, including those from Jazłowiec, were rounded up and settled in Buccacz. On February 2, 1943, 2,000 Jews from there were executed, 500 more were killed on June 11 with one thousand exterminated on June 26 of that year. In March 1944, after the German troops had left, 800 Jews remained in the area. However, the German army later returned and murdered most of those who had emerged from their hideouts.

=== Marian devotion ===
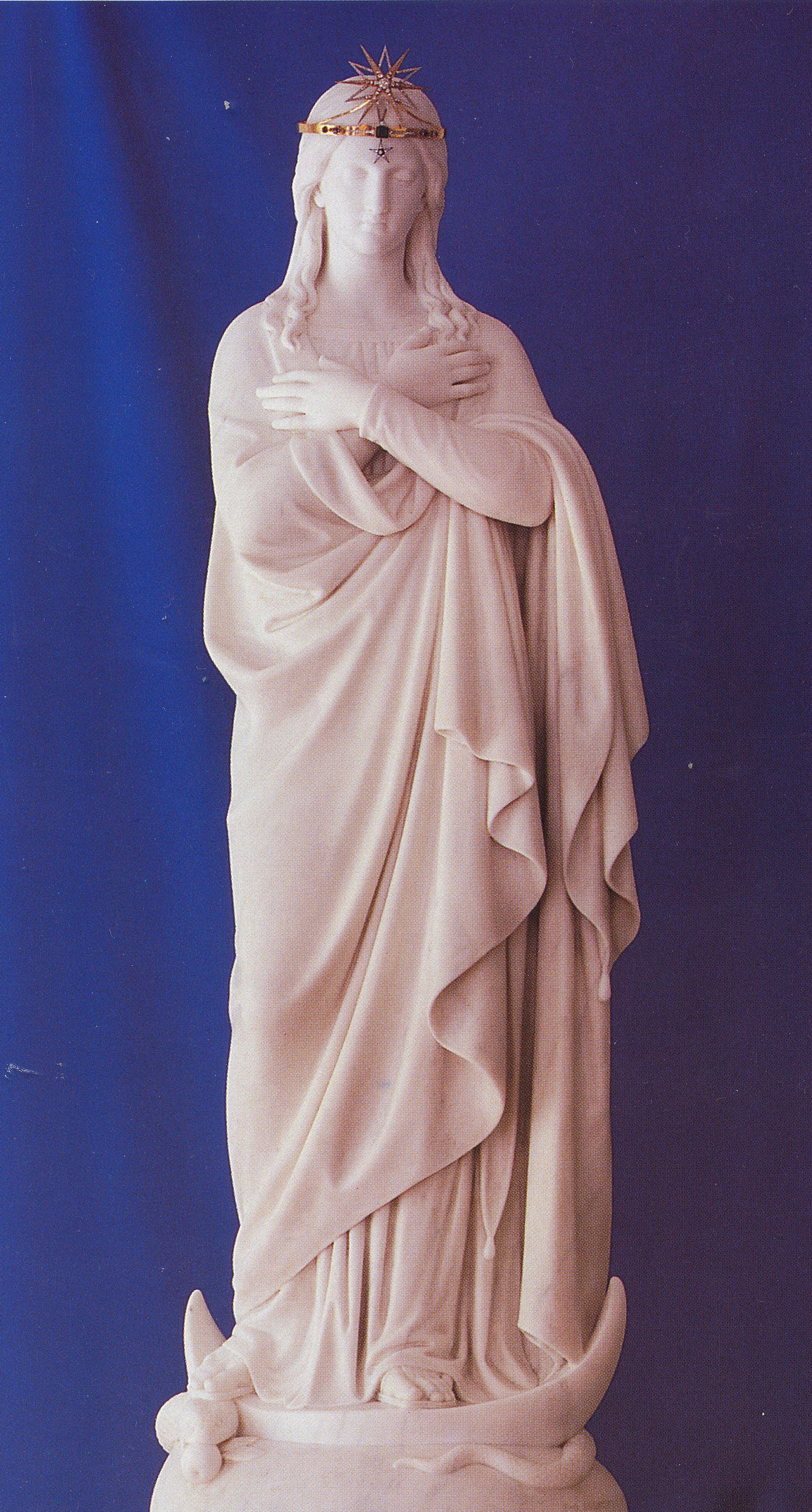
Original statue of Our Lady of Jazłowiec, now in Szymanów

In 1863, Krzysztof Błażowski donated his palace and estate to the Polish noblewoman, widow and mystic, Marcelina Darowska, for the establishment there of a convent for her religious order, the Congregation of the Sisters of the Immaculate Conception of the Blessed Virgin Mary, and a girls secondary school and other educational provision for the local population. The Sisters swiftly established the boarding school in Jazłowiec itself, for the children of wealthy families and which was attended by Darowska's own daughter, Karolina. A network of rural elementary schools was also set up. A statue of Mary the Immaculate, of Carrara marble commissioned by Darowska from Tomasz Oskar Sosnowski in Rome was completed in 1882. It was consecrated in by archbishop, now Saint Zygmunt Feliński in 1883 in the convent chapel. In 1893 the priest appointed to the Catholic parish of St. Anne in Jazłowiec and to be chaplain to the order and the school was Adam Sapieha (1867-1951), future cardinal and Archbishop of Kraków (1911-1951) and Senator of the Sejm.

In 1939, due to the great devotion elicited by it, the statue was crowned by the Cardinal Primate of Poland, August Hlond, with a crown blessed by Pope Pius XII.

=== More wars ===
During World War I Jazłowiec was heavily damaged by Russian troops in 1916. in November 1918, after the formation of the West Ukrainian People's Republic (ZUNR), Yazlovets became part of the ZUNR. Between 11–13 July 1919 a three-day-long battle was fought for the town by Poles and Ukrainians locked in a fratricidal conflict, each trying to secure their statehood. The battle against units of the Ukrainian Galician Army was won by the Poles. Until the Invasion of Poland in September 1939, Jazłowiec belonged to Tarnopol Voivodeship, Poland.

To commemorate the Polish victory in 1919, the 14th Uhlan Regiment of the Polish Army, stationed in the interwar period in Lwów (Lviv), was called the 14th Regiment of Jazlowiec Uhlans. Following the 1939 Soviet Invasion of Poland, the region fell under Soviet rule with the outbreak of World War II.

In 1945, the town was downgraded to the status of a village and renamed Yablunivka, (or Yablonovka in Russian), and most of its Polish residents were forcibly deported for resettlement in the so-called Recovered Territories in Western Poland. The convent was closed by the communist invaders in 1946. Following the collapse of the Soviet Union and the emergence of independent Ukraine after half a century, its earlier Ukrainian name was restored and the convent was revived. In 1946 for security, the marble statue of the Virgin mary was moved, with the help of Soviet troops, to the new Polish border and thence taken to another convent of the order in Szymanów, about 20 km from the Polish capital of Warsaw, where it remains, but a faithful copy has been placed in Yazlovets.

=== Place of pilgrimage ===
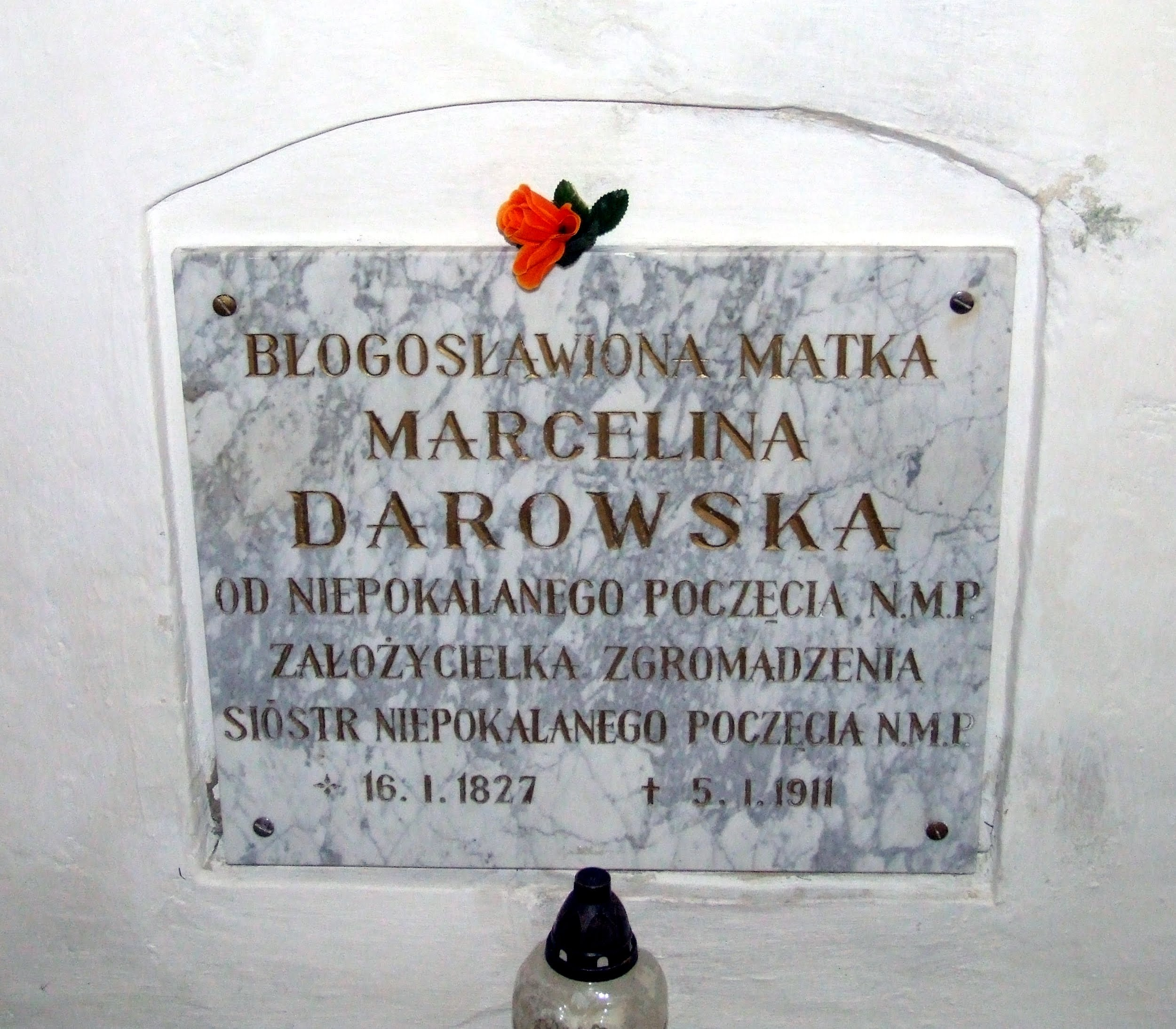
Tomb of Marcelina Darowska in Yazlovets

After the beatification of Marcelina Darowska by Pope John Paul II in 1996, the chapel of the Sisters in Yazlovets was proclaimed a Sanctuary of Blessed Marcelina Darowska on September 1, 1999 by the Latin Church bishop of Lviv, Cardinal Marian Jaworski.

== Administrative reform ==
Until 18 July 2020, Yazlovets belonged to Buchach Raion. The raion was abolished in July 2020 as part of the administrative reform of Ukraine, which reduced the number of raions of Ternopil Oblast to three. The area of Buchach Raion was merged into Chortkiv Raion.

== Places of interest ==
- Yazlovets castle
- Mid 18th-c. Palace, later in 19th-c. Jazłowiec College, élite girls secondary school and convent
- Church of St. Nicholas, UGCC
- Roman Catholic church of the Assumption, n. 1590, ruins
- Ruined synagogue and 18th-c. Jewish cemetery

== Notable people ==
- Jerzy Jazłowiecki, Polish hetman
- Mikołaj Gomółka, Polish composer
- Stanisław Koniecpolski, voivode of Podolia and castellan of Kraków
- Guillaume Le Vasseur de Beauplan, French-Polish cartographer
- John III Sobieski, king of Poland and grand duke of Lithuania, who used the fortress to imprison invading military commanders
- Jan Samuel Chrzanowski, Polish commander at the Battle of Trembowla
- Stanisław Poniatowski (1676–1762), Masovian voivode and castellan of Kraków
- Stanisław August Poniatowski, last elected Polish-Lithuanian monarch
- Baal Shem Tov (1698-1760), Cheder teacher at Yazlowets synagogue, founder of Hasidic Judaism
- Julian Ursyn Niemcewicz (1757-1841), statesman, poet and dramatist frequent visitor in Jazłowiec who wrote an elegy, "Duma o Jazłowcu"
- Teofil Wiśniowski (1805/6-1847) insurgent, emigrant and activist
- Jan Wojciech Kuliczkowski (1810-1869), born in Jazłowiec, officer in the November Uprising, emigrant who died in London
- Sadok Barącz (1814-1892), Armenian Dominican friar, historian and author of "Pamiątki jazłowieckie" (Souvenirs of Jazłowiec),
- Blessed Marcelina Darowska, Polish mystic, foundress
- Marcella Sembrich, alumna of the school, Polish opera singer
- Adam Stefan Sapieha, Polish cardinal archbishop
- Osyp Nazaruk, Ukrainian writer and politician
- Karol D. Witkowski, Polish-American painter, also known as Karl Witkowski (1860-1910)
- Maria Rodziewiczówna, alumna of the school, Polish writer
- Konstanty Plisowski, Polish military commander in the battle for Jazłowiec
- Teresa Łubieńska, Polish Underground Army officer, trustee of the 14th Jazlowiec Uhlan Regiment
- Krystyna Skarbek, wayward pupil at the school, SOE operative and secret agent in WWII
- Roman Vilhushynskyi, Ukrainian sculptor, born in Yazlowets

== Gallery ==
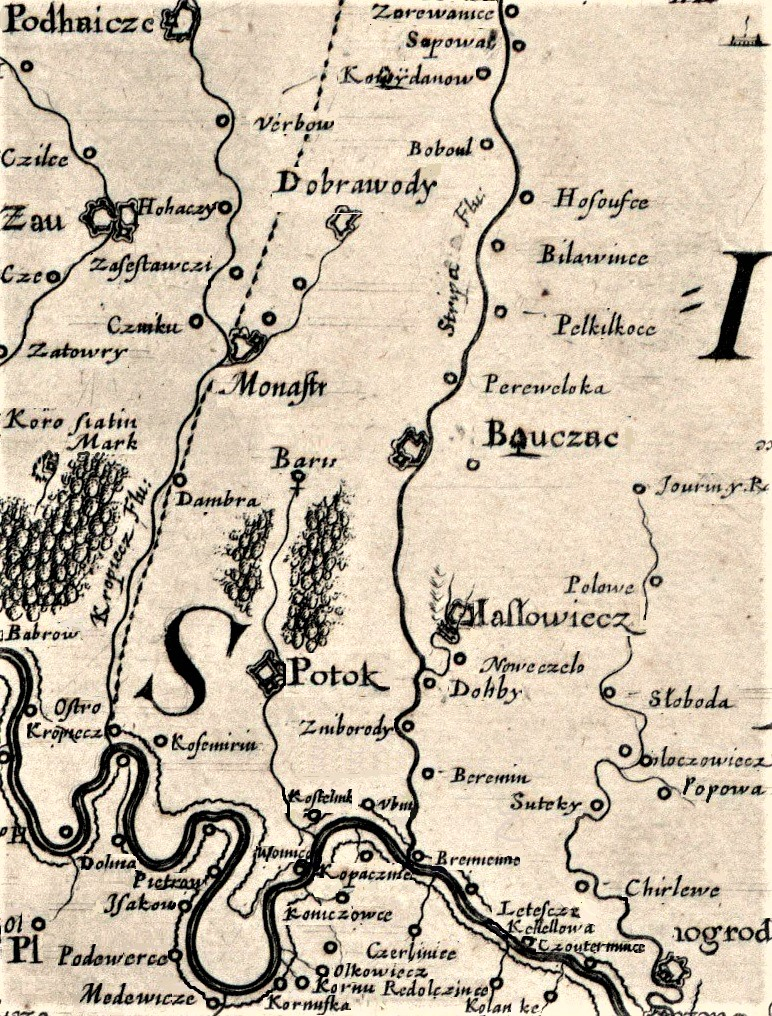
de Beauplan 1650 map with Jazłowiec and Buczacz

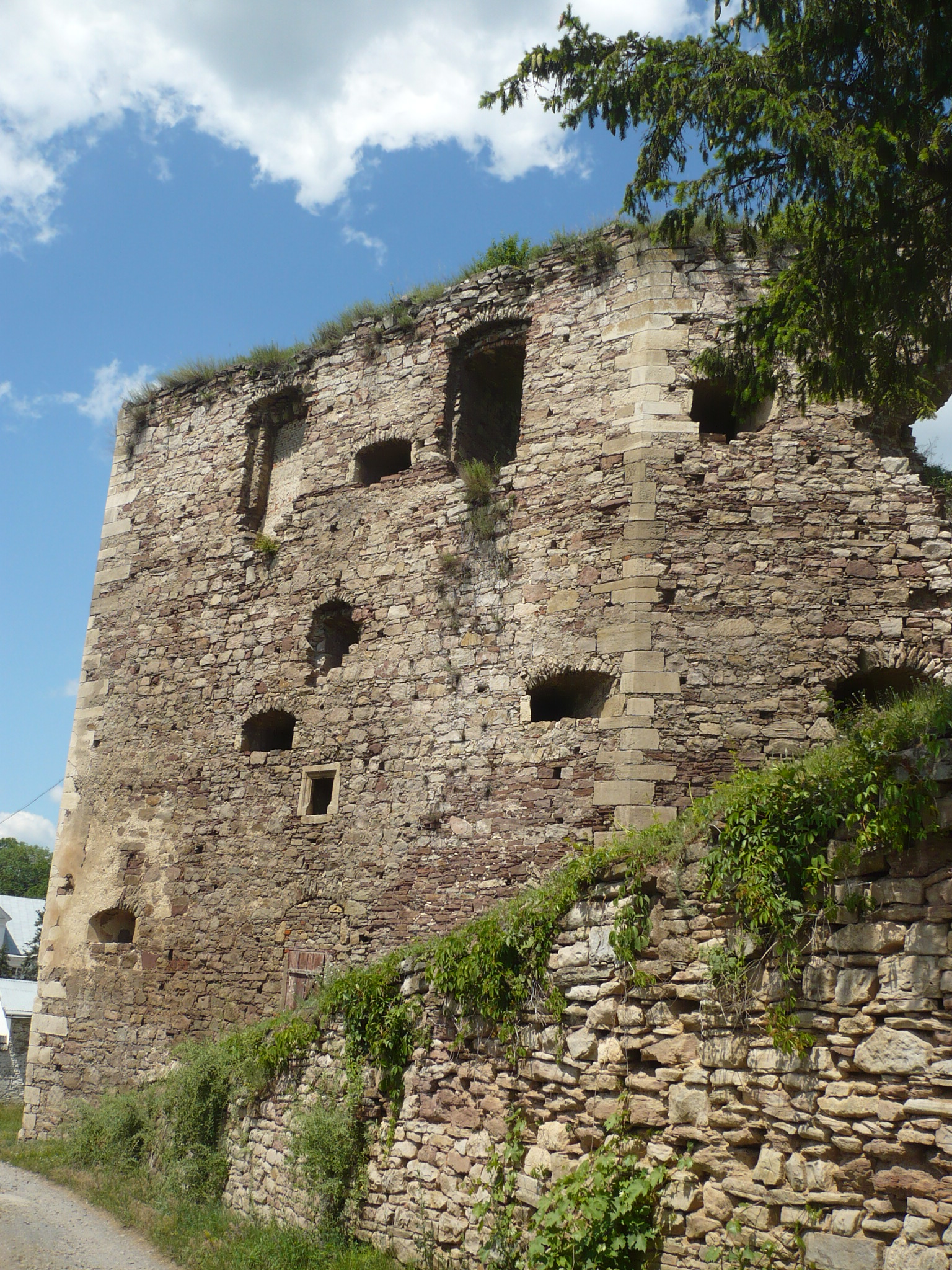
Jazłowiec fortress

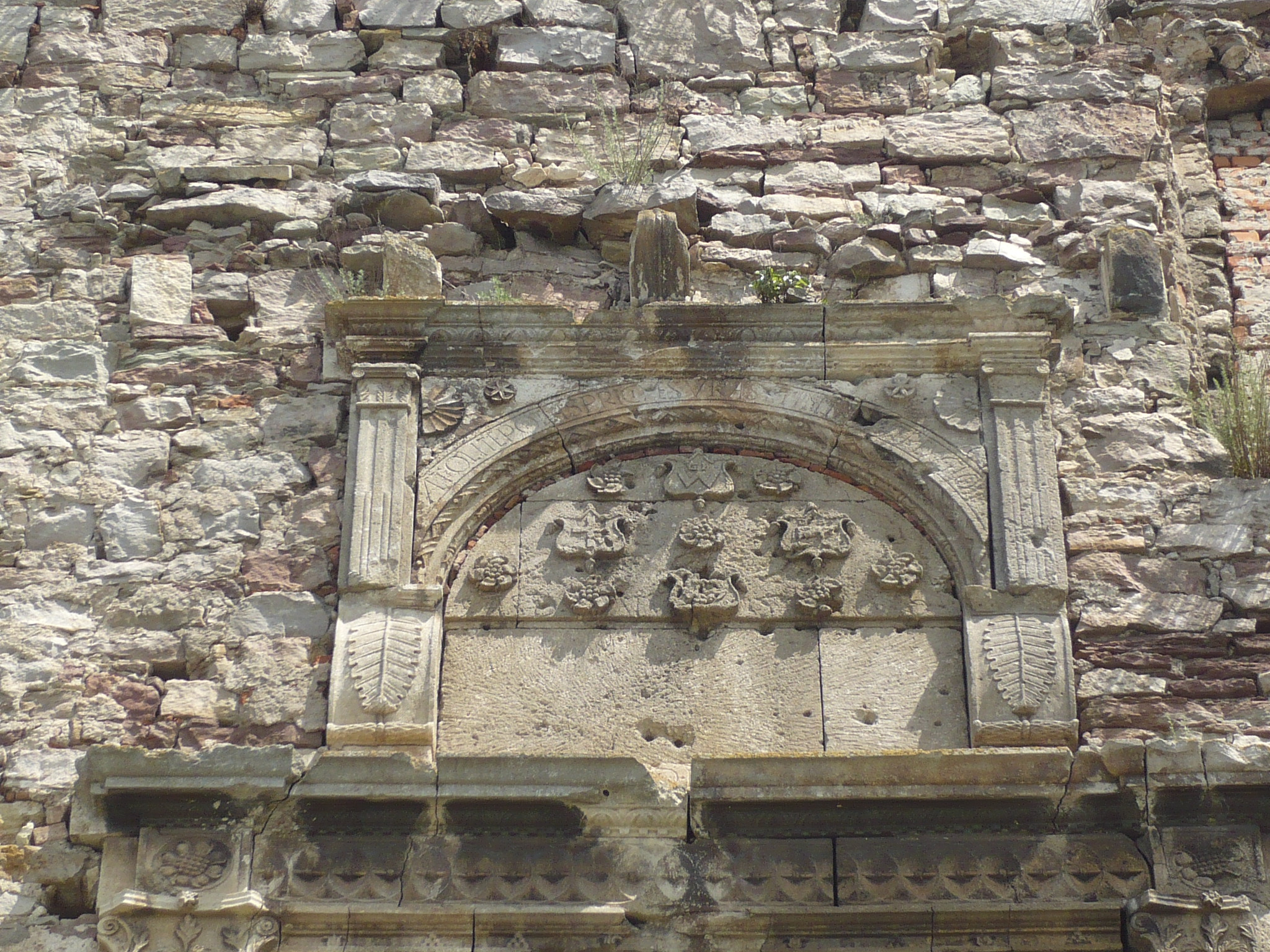
tympanum with the Jazłowiecki Abdank coat of arms on fortress wall

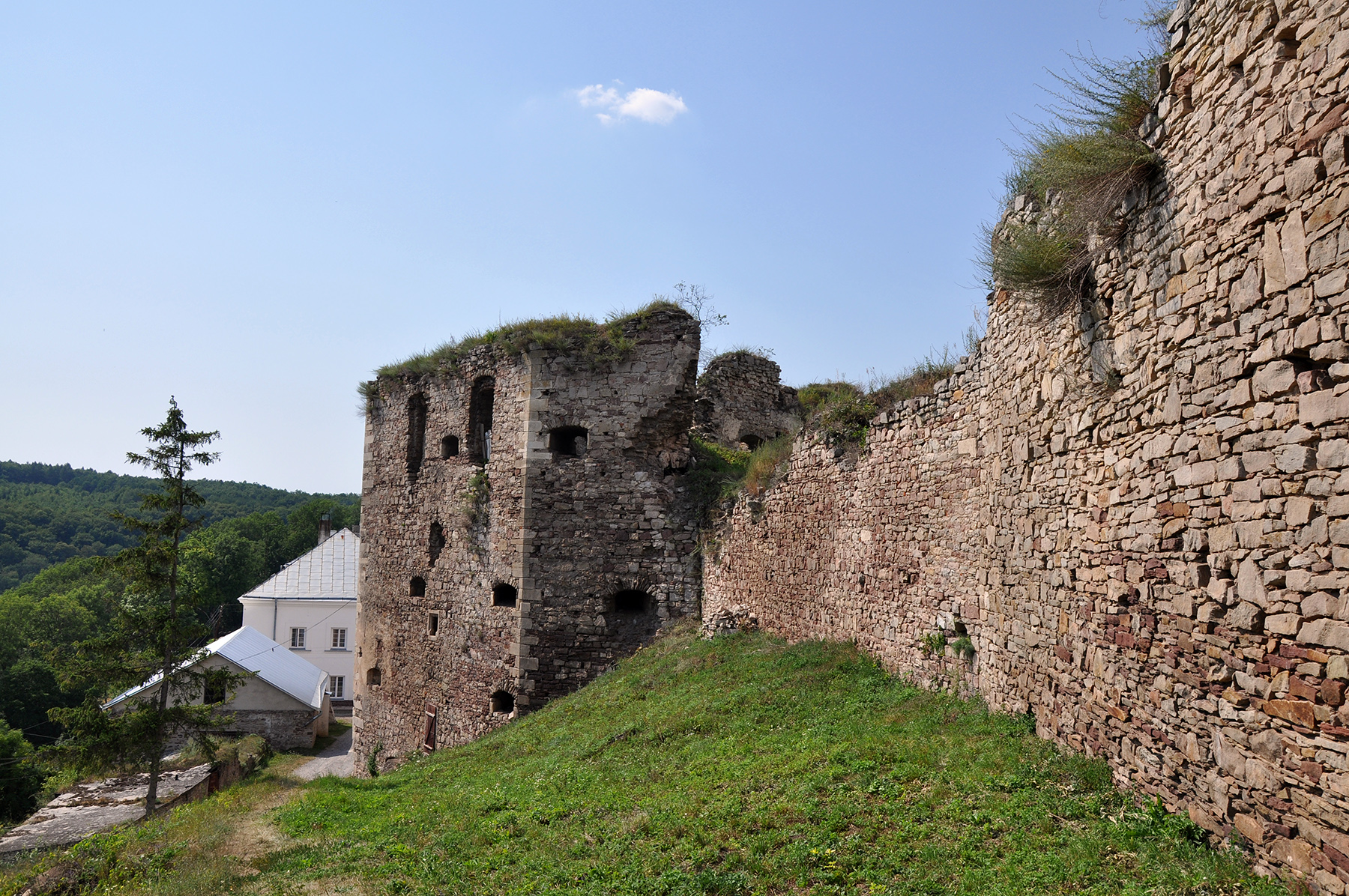
Yazlovets upper castle

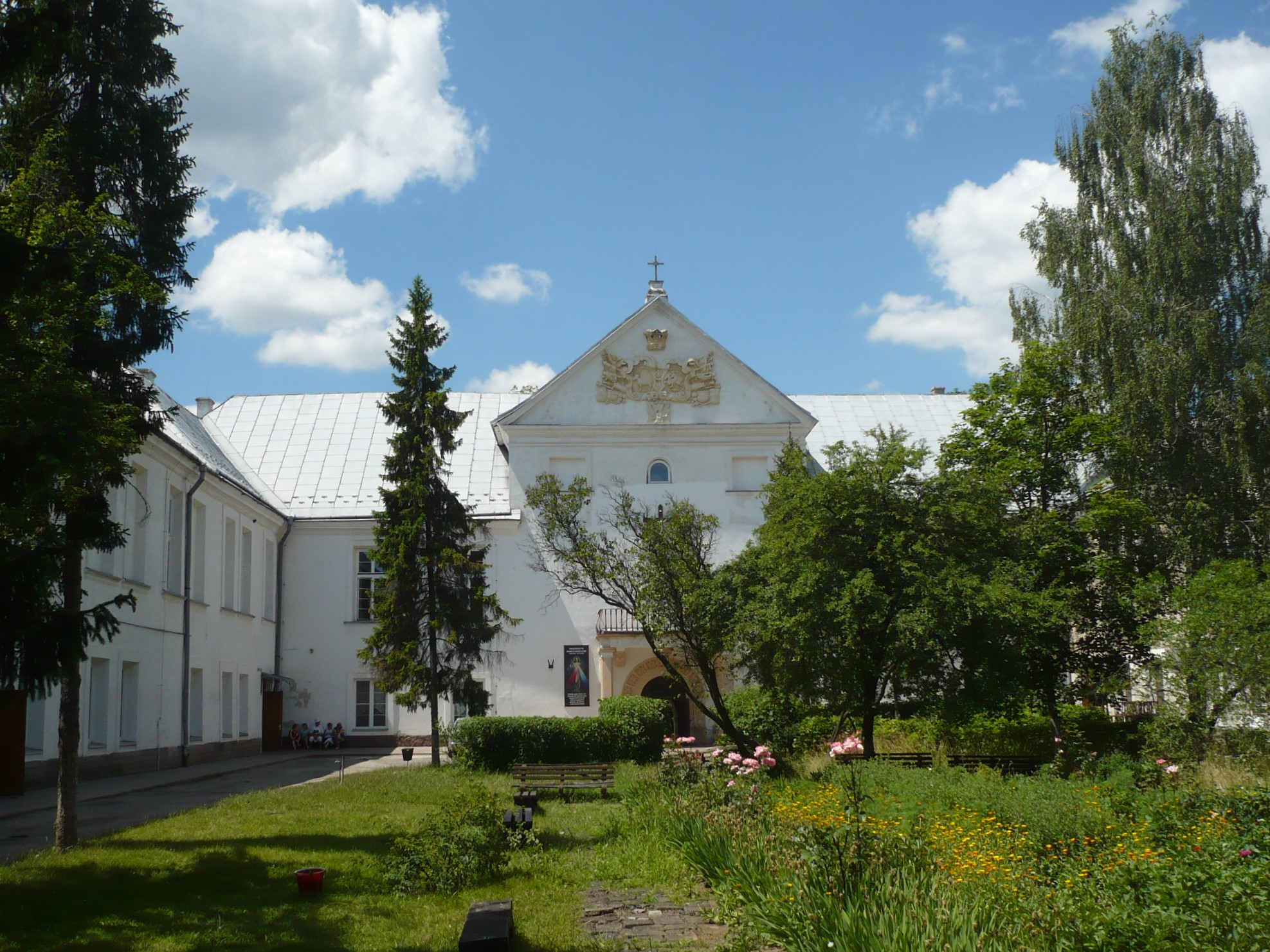
Jazłowiec former convent courtyard

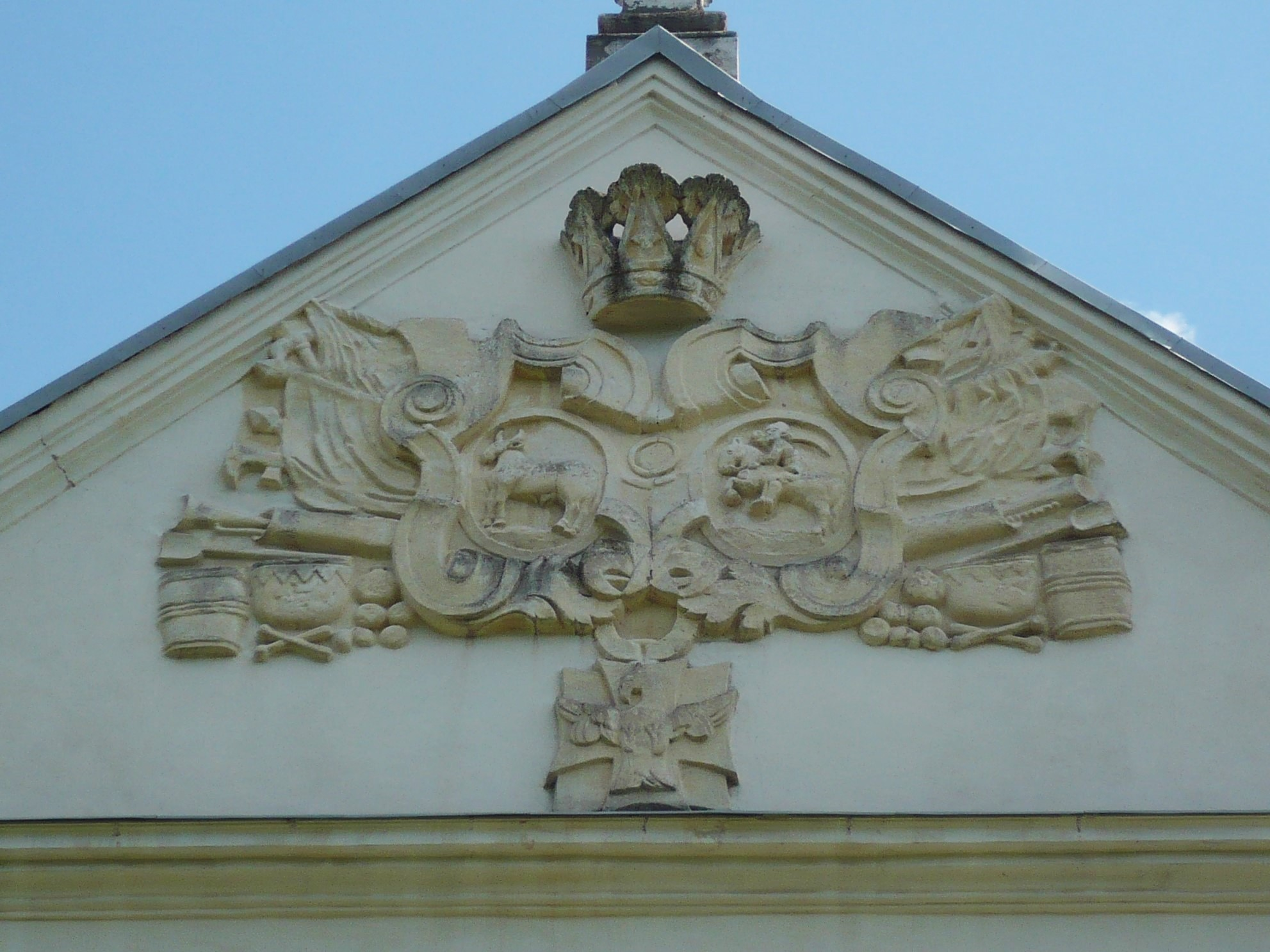
Ciołek and Czartoryski crests (Poniatowski maternal line) on Palace portal

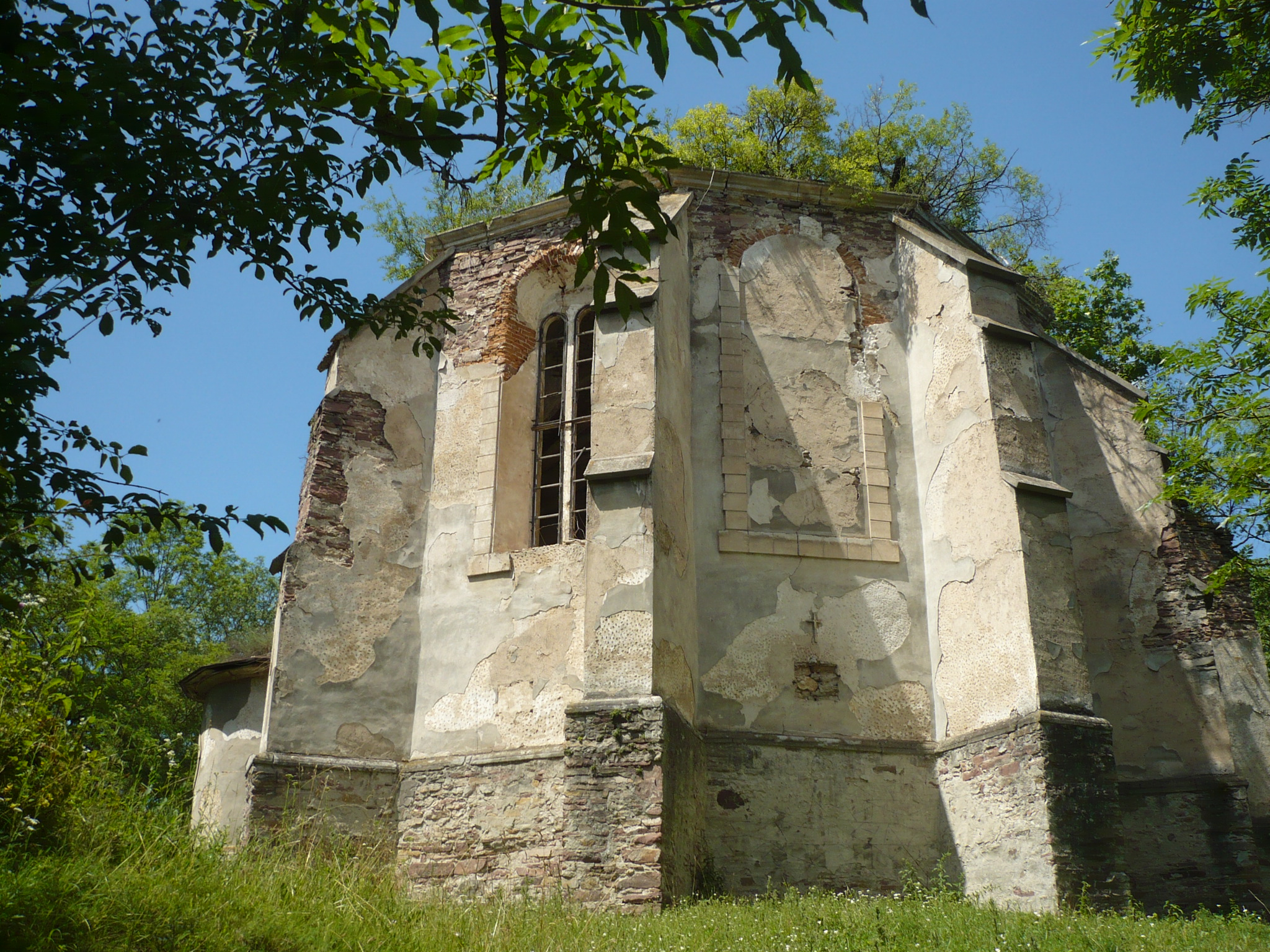
Jazłowiec Catholic church

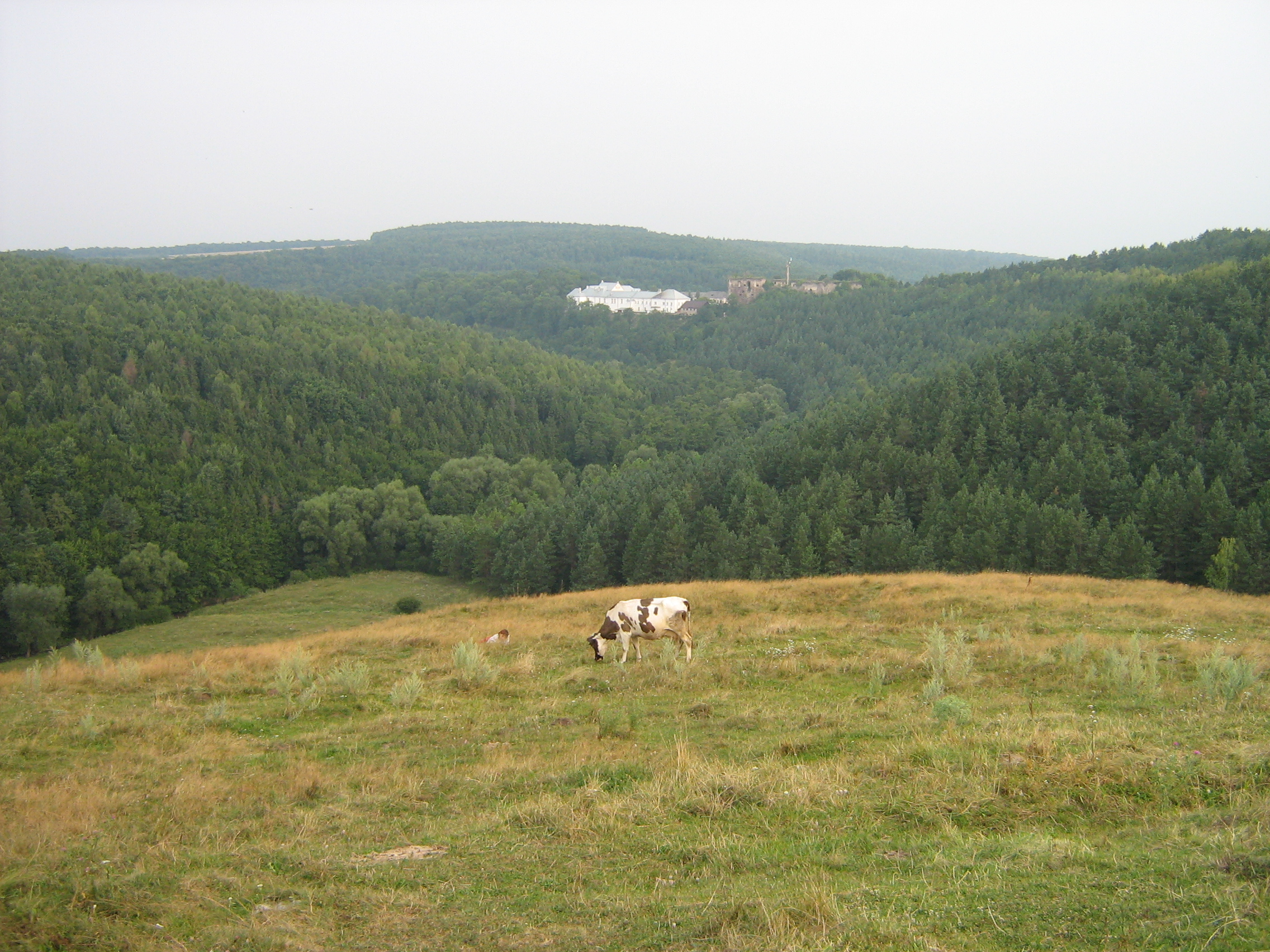
General view of Jazłowiec with village crest animal in the foreground

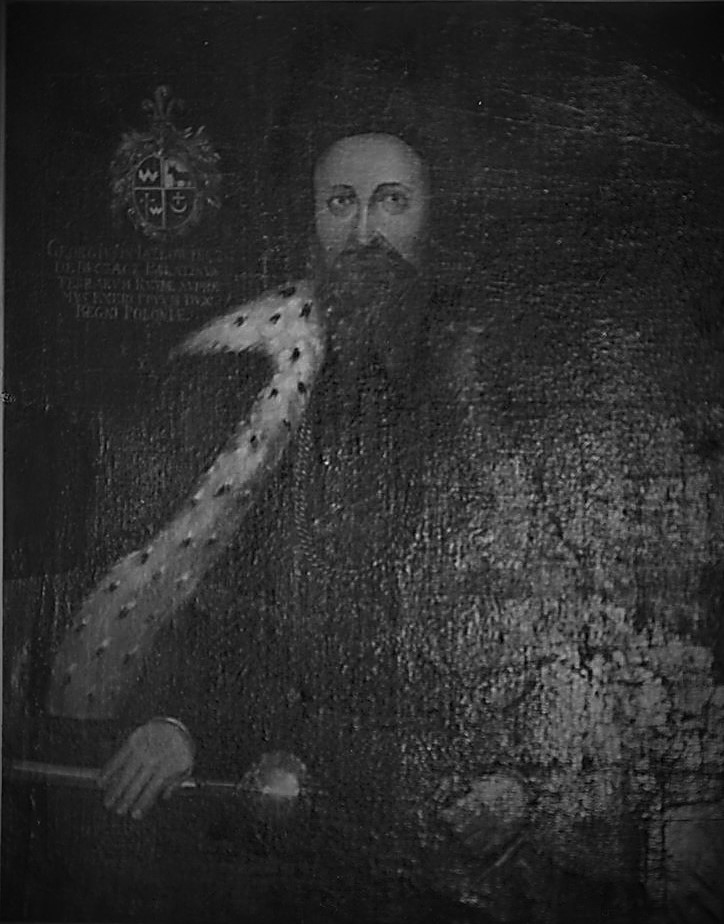
Jerzy Jazłowiecki

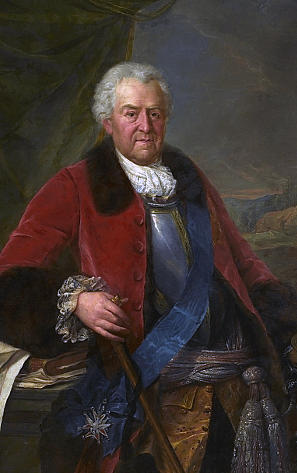
Stanisław Poniatowski (1676-1762)

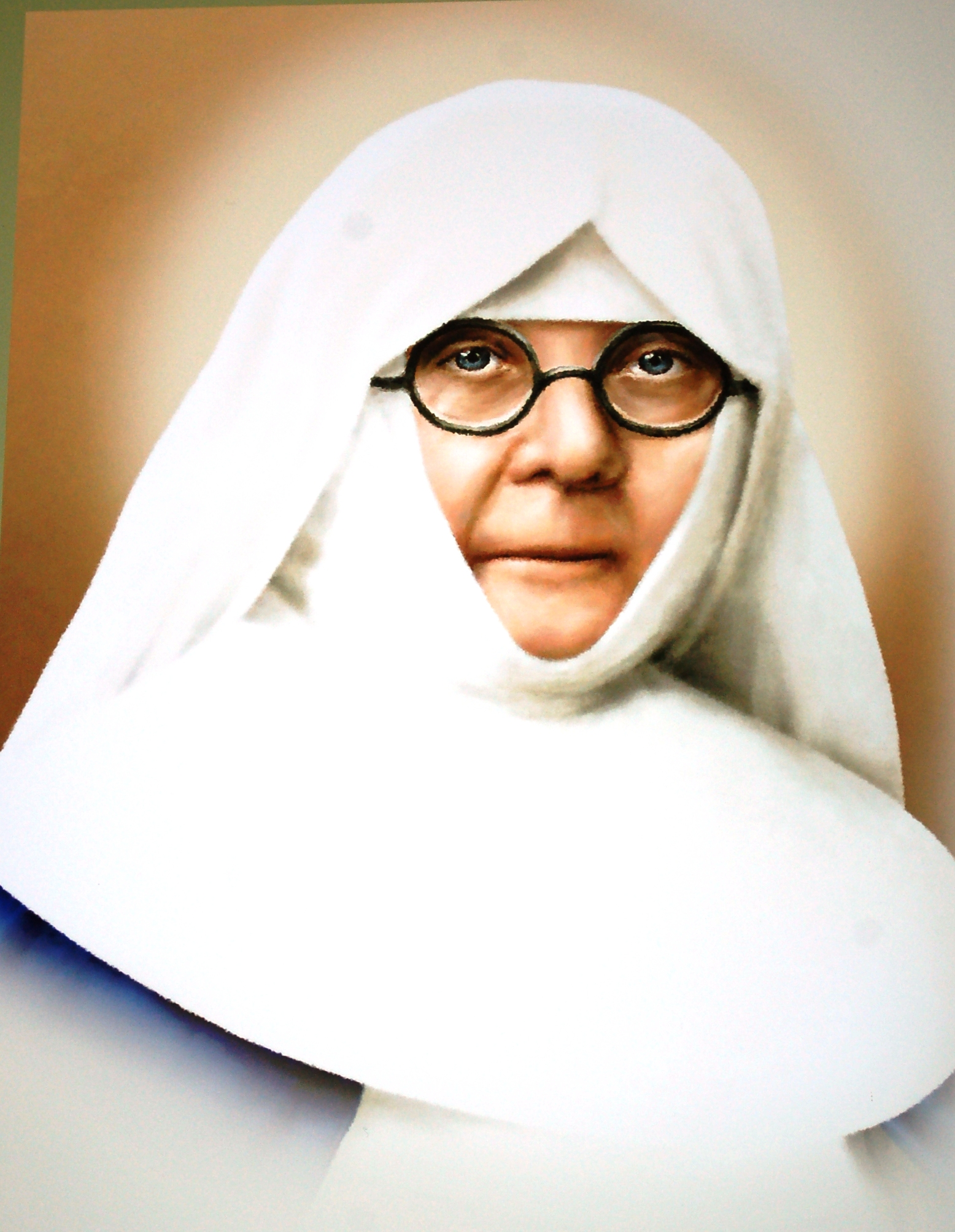
Marcelina Darowska

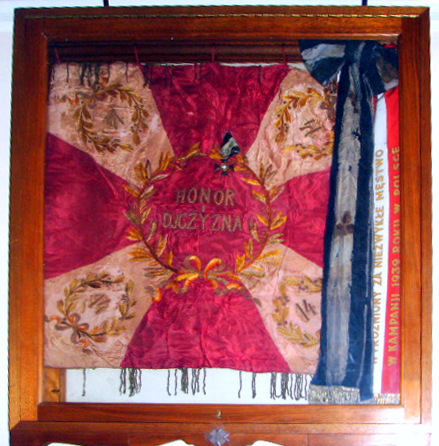
Standard of the 14th Jazlowiec Uhlan Regiment, created by alumnae of the Jazłowiec school in 1921, now in the Sikorski Institute, London

== See also ==
- Our Lady of Jazłowiec
- List of Pontifically crowned images
- St Andrew Bobola Church, Hammersmith
