= Szymanów, Sochaczew County =

Village in Poland

Szymanów
- Village
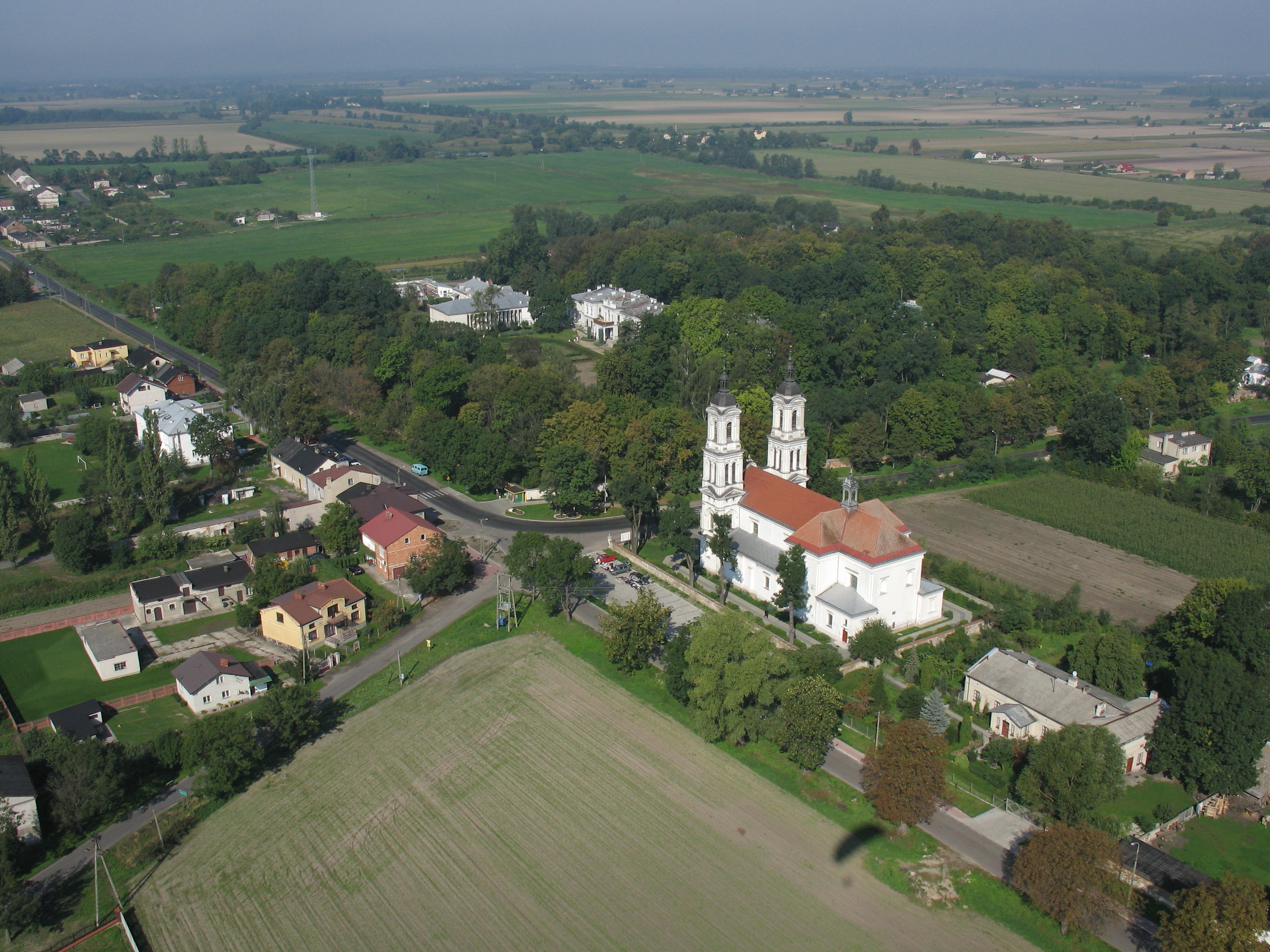
- Aerial view

- Location within Poland
- Coordinates: 52°9′41″N 20°22′50″E
- Country: Poland
- Voivodeship: Masovian
- County: Sochaczew
- Gmina: Teresin
- Time zone: UTC+1 (CET)
  - Summer (DST): UTC+2 (CEST)
- Vehicle registration: WSC

Szymanów (Polish pronunciation: [ʂɨˈmanuf]) is a village in the administrative district of Gmina Teresin, within Sochaczew County, Masovian Voivodeship, in east-central Poland. It is situated on the Pisia River, a tributary of the Bzura.

== Marian shrine ==
The original marble sculpture of Our Lady of Jazłowiec was brought there in 1946, by the Immaculate Conception Sisters, fleeing Soviet occupation of Yazlovets, where the shrine had evolved since 1883 in the original "Mother House", and is now in Ukraine. A faithful copy was installed in Yazlovets in the 1990s. The current headquarters of the order has been in Szymanów since 1933.
