= Church of the Assumption, Yazlovets =

Church in Yazlovets, Ukraine

Church of the Assumption
- Костел Внебовзяття Діви Марії
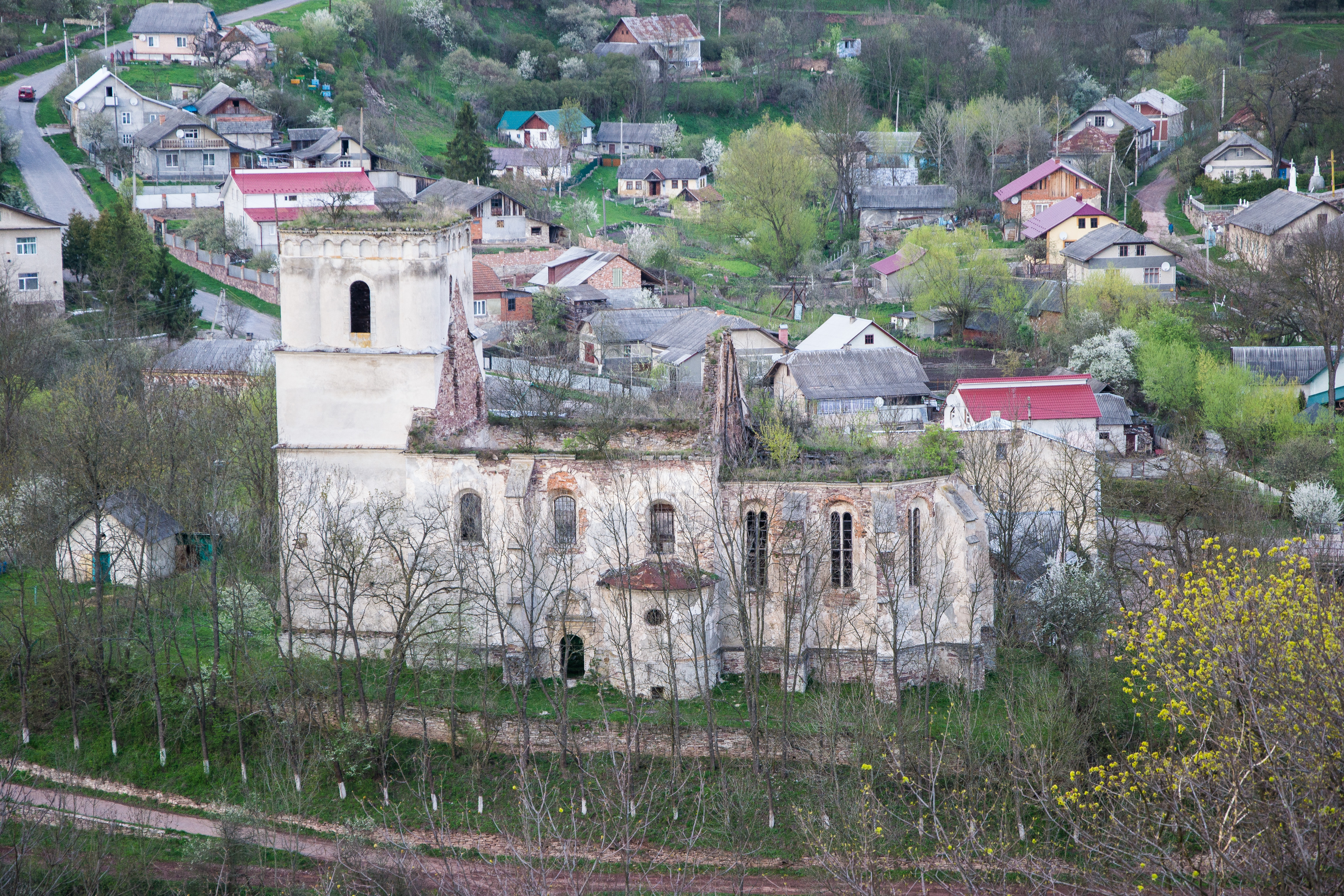

- Location within Ternopil Oblast Location within Ukraine

Location
- Location: Yazlovets, Ternopil Oblast, Ukraine
- Coordinates: 48°57′33.5″N 25°26′28.2″E

Immovable Monument of National Significance of Ukraine
- Official name: Костел (Church)
- Type: Architecture
- Reference no.: 190082

Church of the Assumption (Ukrainian: Костел Внебовзяття Діви Марії) is a Roman Catholic church in Yazlovets, Ternopil Oblast. It is an architectural monument of national significance.

== History ==
In 1583, Mikołaj Jazłowiecki brought priest Antonin from Przemyśl, a Dominican friar, from Lviv. The Dominican church was built on a hill next to the Mary Magdalene church in 1589–1590 in the Gothic-Renaissance style. It was founded by Mikołaj Jazłowiecki. It was consecrated under the patronage of the Assumption of the Blessed Virgin Mary by the Archbishop of Lviv, Jan Dymitr Solikowski. It was rebuilt in 1830 at the expense of the parishioners and, to a large extent, Baron Wiktor Błażowski, the then patron and benefactor of the church in Yazlovets. It functioned as a temple until 1945. Later, it housed a vodka warehouse.

The church houses the tombstone of Polish composer Mikołaj Gomółka, who died in 1609, which was originally located in the wall surrounding the former parish church of St. Mary Magdalene in Yazlovets.

In 1745, the Dominican prior was Anzelm Piątkowski, who compiled a short chronicle of Yazlovets.

Mikołaj Strzemeski, who died "in the prime of life" at the hands of the Tatars, was buried at the Dominican monastery in Yazlovets.

== Architecture ==
A single-nave church with a pentagonal chancel and two 17th-century chapels on both sides of the nave. Fragments of frescoes, three Renaissance portals, and fragments of Gothic and Renaissance details have survived on the chancel vault.

The building is in ruins.

== Bibliography ==
- Sadok Barącz: Pamiątki jazłowieckie. Lwów, 1862. Accessed 2017-12-31.
