= Congregation of the Sisters of the Immaculate Conception of the Blessed Virgin Mary =

Female religious teaching congregation

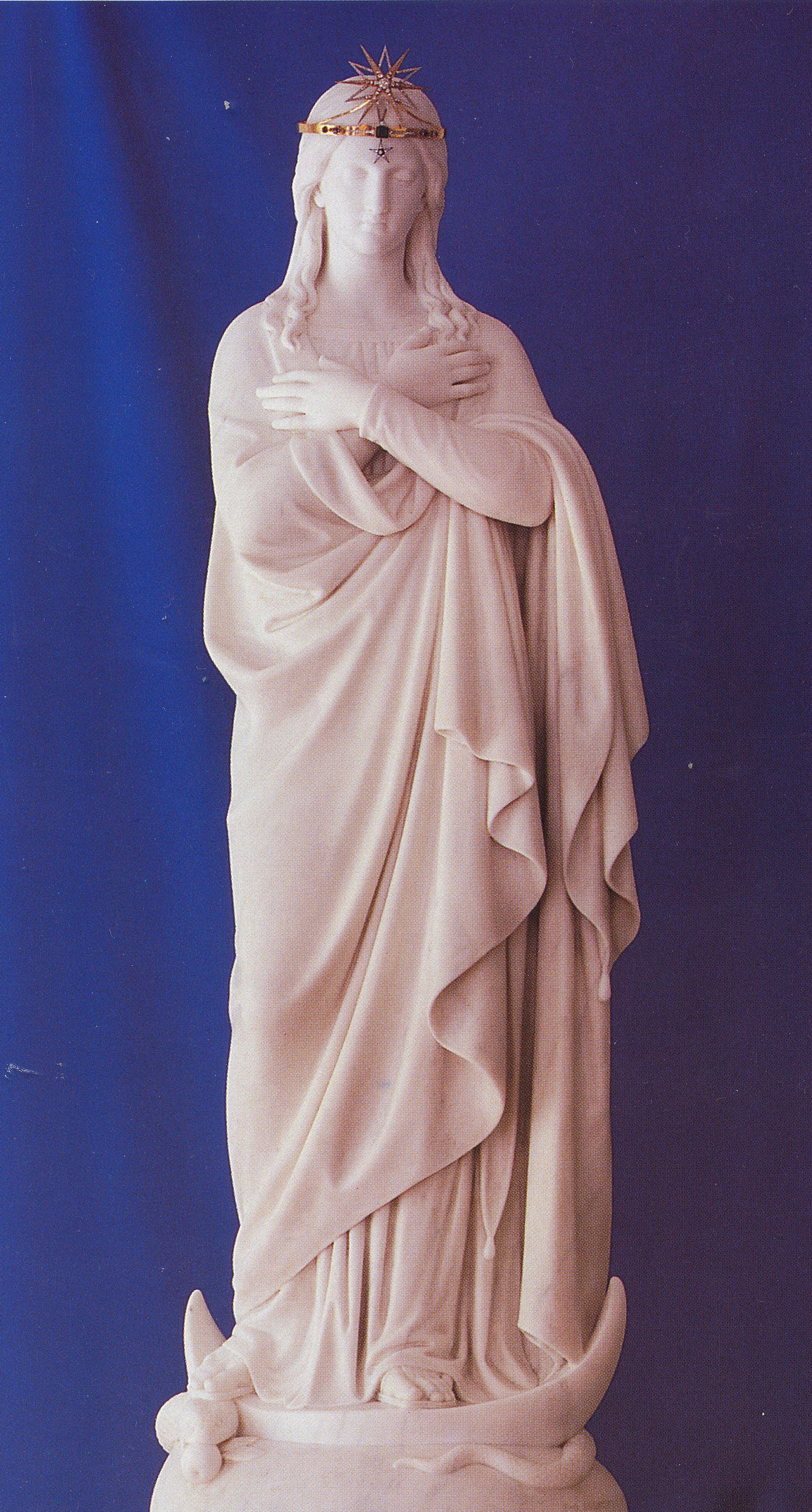
- Our Lady of Jazłowiec
- Abbreviation: CSIC (post-nominal letters)
- Established: November 25, 1857; 168 years ago
- Founders: Józefa Karska; Marcelina Darowska
- Founded at: Rome
- Type: Centralized Religious Institute of Consecrated Life of Pontifical Right (for Women)
- Headquarters: Motherhouse; Szymanów, Sochaczew County, Poland
- Region served: Poland, Belarus, Ukraine
- Leader: Matka Maria Wawrzyna od Ducha Świętego, Wiesława Chwedoruk
- Parent organization: Roman Catholic Church
- Website: http://www.niepokalanki.pl/

Congregation of the Sisters of the Immaculate Conception of the Blessed Virgin Mary (in Polish Zgromadzenie Sióstr Niepokalanego Poczęcia Najświętszej Marii Panny) is a female religious congregation di diritto pontificio: the members of this congregation add the initials CSIC to their name

== History ==
The congregation was founded in Rome on November 25, 1857, by Józefa Karska with the collaboration of Marcelina Darowska (1827–1911). The widow Darowska was yet to make her solemn vows. Referred by Aleksander Jełowicki to Hieronim Kajsiewicz, co-founder of the Resurrectionist Congregation, Kajsiewicz drafted the first rule for the sisters, inspired by that of the Resurrectionist Congregation.

After the untimely death of the sickly first Mother General, Karska, in 1860, on January 17, 1863, Pope Pius IX granted her successor, Darowska, the right to move the headquarters of the congregation to Jazłowiec, in the Western Austrian-occupied part of her native Podolian region of Poland, in the Roman Catholic Archdiocese of Lviv, where she received the charitable gift of an estate.

The original rule was revised in 1872 by Darowska, which highlighted the specificities of the congregation. Pius IX granted the Sisters of the Immaculate Conception a decretum laudis on May 22, 1863, and approved the congregation on July 29, 1874. During her generalate, Darowska organised the following houses:

- Jazłowiec (1863), Ukraine where currently there is a retreat house named for Blessed Marcelina Darowska.
- Jarosław (1875)
- Niżniów (1883), now in Ukraine
- Nowy Sącz (1897)
- Słonim (1907), now in Belarus
- Szymanów (1908), which has been the Mother house since 1933.

The co-founder, Marcelina Darowska was beatified by John Paul II in 1996.

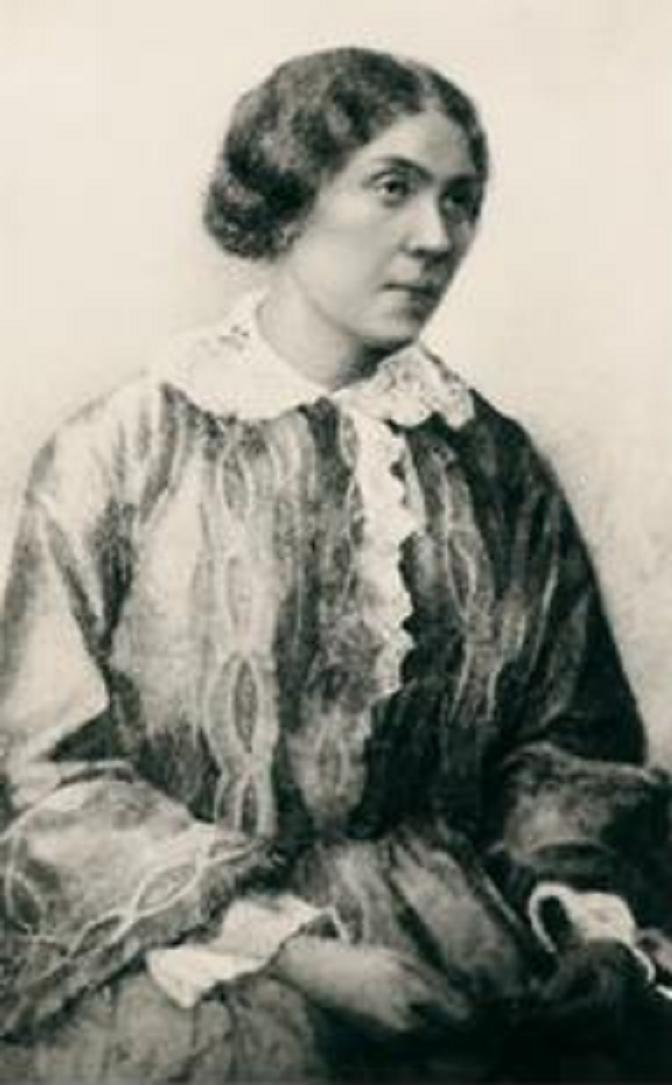
Józefa Karska, cofounder and first Mother General

== Activity and diffusion ==
The Sisters of the Immaculate Conception dedicate themselves to the Christian education of youth, especially girls and young women, and to parish work.

In addition to Poland, the order is present in Belarus and Ukraine. The order is headquartered in Szymanów, where the sisters are custodians of the shrine to Our Lady of Jazłowiec.

In December 2005, the congregation had 225 nuns in 13 houses.

== See also ==
- Jazłowiec College
- Our Lady of Jazłowiec
