= Karol D. Witkowski =

American painter

Karol (Karl) D. Witkowski (16 August 1860, Yazlovets, now in Chortkiv Raion – 17 May 1910) was a Polish-American portraitist and genre painter, better known in the US as Karl Witkowski. He painted scenes of contemporary daily life in America.

== Biography ==
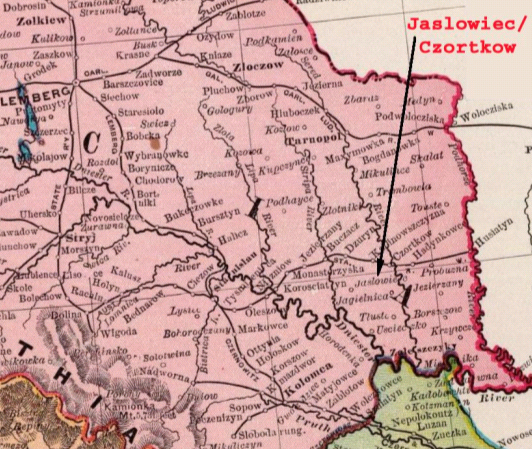
Jazłowiec & Czortków in Eastern Galicia

Karol Dominik Witkowski was born to a Polish family in Jazłowiec (Jaslowiec), near Buchach, Czortków (Podole, Poland, now Ukraine).

As a child he showed a precocious talent for drawing and his parents sent him to school in Chortkiv (12 miles from Yazlovets). In 1879 he enlisted in the Austrian Army (19th-century southern Poland was occupied by Austria and was part of Galicia), where he gained popularity by making portraits of fellow soldiers and commanding officers, including a portrait of General Duke William of Württemberg and a portrait of Lieutenant Field Marshal Emanuel Salomon Friedberg-Mírohorský. In 1880 Witkowski left the army and moved to Kraków, where from 1881 to 1883 he studied arts at the Academy of Fine Arts under the directorship of Jan Matejko. Witkowski also studied arts in Munich under Karl von Piloty. Around 1884 Witkowski emigrated from Poland, like many others, and went to America, where he stayed for three years. During that time he created his first famous paintings of young people. In 1887 he left America and arrived in France. In Paris Witkowski studied at the Julian Academy (1887-1888) and continued to work on paintings and portraits. Most of his paintings done there he signed with the added initial of author's second name (K.D. Witkowski). Among Witkowski's painting done in France were Portrait de Tomas Milatycki and Mother with Children.

In 1889 Witkowski returned to America and stayed for over 20 years until his death. During those years, besides portraits of the elite in New York City and Newark areas, he made over 200 paintings of young people (mostly newsboys and shoeshine boys), their daily life, at work and at play, often with their pets. The style of these paintings recalls the style of John George Brown to some extent. Most of these paintings were signed ”K. Witkowski”. From 1891 until his death his paintings were available for sale at various auctions and picture galleries of New York City area. For some time he had his own studio in Brooklyn, New York (1903).

Upon his arrival in the United States in 1884, Witkowski lived in New York City (from 1884 to 1887 and again from 1889 to 1891), later moving to Newark in 1891, and then to Irvington, South Orange, and Vailsburg, Newark.

Witkowski died on May 17, 1910, in Newark, from blood poisoning, survived by his wife. Witkowski died at the height of his artistic powers. In 1909 he registered 8 paintings through the United States Copyright Office and in just a few months of 1910 he created and registered 14 pieces more, also in the last months of his life, he exhibited his work at the State Fair of Texas and galleries of New York City.

== Paintings ==
Karl Witkowski painted the elite in Newark, New Jersey. He painted newsboys and street urchins in Newark. As a European-trained artist, he offered a distinctive portrayal of American newsboy life. His paintings are noted for their characteristic humor and brightness, ranging from lighthearted scenes to more reflective compositions .

Paintings executed by Witkowski during his time in the United States:

- A Can of Worms
- A Good Catch
- After a Raid
- Anticipation (The Bubble Blower)
- April Showers
- Boy with an Apple
- Boys Playing Marbles
- Caught One
- Drawin your Picture
- Expecting a Boom
- Feeding His Pets
- Fishing (three boys fishing)
- Flower Seller
- Game of Marbles
- Going Sleighing
- Gone Fishing
- Guarding the Flower Basket
- Shoeshine Boy (Harmonica Player)
- His Favorite Flower, 36 x 42 inches
- Knucks Down
- Look What I Have
- Mending the Baseball
- My Pigeons
- One for Two
- Partners
- Playing a Tune
- Playing with Fire
- Secrets
- Sharing (two street urchins in a street about to eat an apple which the smaller boy is dividing)
- Solitude
- Steady, oil on canvas 20 x 24 inches
- Street Urchins
- Teasing my Best Friend
- The Pets
- The Slingshot (The Little Hunter)
- Three Newsboys
- Two Girls Playing in a Field of Daisies
- Under the Mistletoe
- Waiting for a Bite
- Young Artist
- Boyish Pranks, 1885
- Portrait of a Woman, 1885
- Pick a Hand, 1889
- Shoeshine Boys, 1889
- Their First Smoke, 1889
- Stealing Apples, 1890
- Shoeshine Boy, 1891
- First Cigarettes, 1892
- One Paper Left, 1898
- The War News, 1898
- Newsboy, 1899
- A Borrowed Light, Copyright 1900, 24 x 30 inches (a barefooted boy, holding a lighted cigarette, is leaning against a board fence; a newsboy, with a bunch of papers under his left arm).
- A Boutonniere, Copyright 1900, 20 x 30 inches (little girl with plain dress, without jacket, is putting carnation into button- hole of the newsboy's coat, The boy is leaning against a gray stone wall and has a newspaper in his left hand)
- A Little Bum, Copyright 1900, 16 x 24 inches (a street urchin, in dark brown shirt and dark blue knee pants, is sitting on a board box on the sidewalk. In right hand he holds lighted cigarette)
- A News Girl, Copyright 1900, 14 x 20 inches (a little girl, with dark brown hair, is holding a bunch of newspapers under her arm; half figure)
- A Sybarite, Copyright 1900, 20 x 24 inches (newsboy sitting on open board box, near a fence, smoking. Holds lighted cigarette in right hand and is exhaling the smoke; lace is almost profile)
- Admiration, 1900
- Gathering Daisies, 1900
- Refreshments, Copyright 1900, 20 x 24 inches (a newsboy is sitting on an open box, leaning against a fence, eating an orange. Has on white shirt with light blue stripes. Sunny effect, Face, three-quarter position)
- To Swap or Not to Swap?, Copyright 1900, 24 x 30 inches (figure of newsboy and little flower girl. The boy has a newspaper in right hand and has his left hand placed on girl's shoulder and is trying to swap his last paper for the rose held by girl)
- Young Woman with Chrysanthemum, 1900
- A Born Artist, Copyright 1901 (a boy dressed in striped shirt and blue overalls and tattered cap is seated on board box, drawing a picture on the wall)
- A Boy, Copyright 1901 (sitting on a box near a gray wall holding a file of newspapers on his lap).
- A Bunch of Carnations, Copyright 1901 (two figures. Boy trying to smell a bunch of carnations held by a fair-haired girl)
- A Business Transaction, Copyright 1901, November 28, 1900, 20 x 30 inches
- A Girl's Head, Copyright 1901, 12 x 14 inches
- A Little Musician, Copyright 1901, 20 x 24 inches
- A Park Row Gallant, Copyright 1901 (news girl sitting on board box on a street pavement)
- A Sign of Hard Wear, Copyright 1901 (little boy sitting on a wooden box; boy has on blue overalls torn at the knees)
- A Solo, Copyright 1901, December 21, 1900, 24 x 20 inches
- A Thorn, Copyright 1901, December 21, 1900, 21 x 17 inches
- An Unpleasant Situation, Copyright 1901 (little boy dressed in light blue shirt, red cap with white dots, tattered bluish pants, is holding three loaves of bread)
- Born Talent, Copyright 1901 (boy sitting on box near wall; wears brown hat, white-striped shirt, blue overalls, tan shoes. Boy is drawing on box)
- Boy Eating Orange, Copyright 1901 (boy sitting on fruit basket eating an orange; wears brown hat, white-striped shirt, bluish-gray pants, black stockings, torn hat)
- Boy with Orange, Copyright 1901 (smiling boy sitting on a peach basket peeling an orange)
- Brother and Sister, Copyright 1901 (boy and girl sitting on sidewalk near wall)
- Fruit Eaters, Copyright 1901, 24 x 30 inches (double figure painting. Little girl with dark curly hair, white dress, is sitting on wooden box, holding a square basket of peaches)
- Got Change, Copyright 1901
- Helping Himself, Copyright 1901 (boy sitting on a box holding an apple in his hand)
- Newsboy and Flower Girl, Copyright 1901, March 13, 1901 & May 8, 1901 (newsboy with a file of papers under his left arm is leaning over to smell a bouquet of flowers)
- Partners, Copyright 1901, November 28, 1900
- Taking a Rest, Copyright 1901 (boy sitting on ground holding a red handkerchief full of apples)
- The Dudes, Copyright 1901 (two boys walking on the sidewalk. Background wall; one boy is dressed in dark blue hat, brownish grey coat)
- The Little Organist, Copyright 1901 (boy of about seven years of age playing a mouth organ)
- The Partners, Copyright 1901 (two boys sitting on a board box near a wall; one boy holds a paper bag in his right hand and is trying to get something out of it with his left)
- The Reader, Copyright 1901 (a boy sitting on a square piece of stone, near a light grey wall, holding paper in his hands and smiling at its contents)
- The Stubborn Eve, Copyright 1901
- Portrait of Monsignor George Hobart Doane, 1902 Rector of St. Patrick's Cathedral, Newark
- A Flower Girl, Copyright 1902 (little girl with dark curly hair, wearing pink dress, red ribbon in hair, is pouring water from a glass into a pot containing a geranium)
- A Goldfish, Copyright 1902 (little fair-haired girl, sitting before a table upon which stands a glass bowl filled with aquatic plants)
- A Musical Boy, Copyright 1902, watercolor (boy, half figure; boy's face is smiling)
- A New Scheme, Copyright 1902 (two boys standing near a wall, smaller boy leaning against a box, larger boy telling him of a new scheme)
- A Penny Saved is a Penny Earned, Copyright 1902, December 6, 1901/ January 9, 1902 (small boy sitting on wooden box, dressed in overalls, striped waist and tattered cap)
- A Prosperous Business Man, Copyright 1902 (small boy sitting on stone walk, left arm resting on sidewalk)
- An Unsolicited Testimonial, Copyright 1902 (little girl seated at table pouring tea, wears dark dress and white apron)
- Anticipation of Enjoyment, Copyright 1902 (boy, half figure, wears a black cap, blue coat, and red shirt)
- Boy Resting, Copyright 1902, watercolor 16 x 16 inches (half figure of newsboy leaning against post)
- Feather in His Hat, Copyright 1902 (girl and boy sitting on wooden boxes near corner of brick wall)
- In Fairyland, Copyright 1902 (little girl with fair, curly hair, wearing light red dress, sitting near a table reclining against green cushion)
- Marketing, Copyright 1902 (little girl with brown hair wearing red dress and white apron, coming from market)
- Neighbors, Copyright 1902 (little dark haired girl, with curly hair tied with ribbons, is standing before fence)
- The Critic, Copyright 1902
- The Flower Girl, Copyright 1902, oil painting 24 x 20 inches (girl dressed in dark jacket, light green striped skirt, sitting on box)
- The Picture Book, Copyright 1902 (little boy and girl looking at a picture book)
- Portrait of Charles Edward McDonnell, 1903 Roman Catholic Bishop of Brooklyn (Brooklyn, NY)
- A Stitch in Time Saves Nine, Copyright 1903, oil painting (little girl seated holding doll in her lap on which she has been sewing)
- Another Cup, Please, Copyright 1903 (little girl seated at table pouring tea, wears dark dress; little boy is pushing toward girl an empty cup)
- Begging for Cherries, 1903
- Boy with Cat, Copyright 1903, watercolor 17 x 13 1/2 inches (rays of evening sun are shining down upon a boy carrying yellow-brown cat in his straw hat)
- Cash is the Thing, Copyright 1903, watercolor 14 1/2 x 20 inches (a boy, dark blue cap, brown torn jacket and pants, leaning against a barrel)
- Clear Profits, Copyright 1903, oil on canvas 20 x 24 inches (a boy with white felt hat, blue jacket, brown knee pants, stockings, and shoes, sitting on a curb stone)
- First Earnings, Copyright 1903, oil on canvas 20 x 16 inches (half length figure of newsboy leaning against a barrel on top of which he has placed his papers and some coin)
- Halloween, Copyright 1903, oil on canvas (little boy and girl; girl sitting before a table holding looking glass)
- Raking in the Money, Copyright 1903 (three quarter length figure of boy, face full front, standing in grain field)
- The Repast, Copyright 1903, oil on canvas 20 x 24 inches (a boy sitting on a box, newspapers under his arm, is eating an apple)
- Eating Cherries on a Summer Day, Copyright May 24, 1904 (a boy eating cherries on a summer day, oil on canvas)
- See the Conquering Hero Comes, Copyright 1904
- The Temptation of Adam, exhibited in 1902
- Waitin' to Git Even, Copyright 1905 (boy in red and white striped sweater and knickerbockers hiding behind boxes holding snowball in right hand)
- Friends, Copyright 1906 (boy in red sweater, green newsboy cap and knickerbockers seated on door step, holding white rabbit, and feeding green vegetables to it)
- Private Rehearsal, Copyright 1906 (little girl and two boys in wheat field. She is dancing, while the boys lean against a board fence. One is whistling and the other clapping his hands)
- Among the Daisies, Copyright 1907 (two children picking flowers in field)
- Bonfire, Copyright 1907, oil on canvas 20 x 24 inches (night scene, background, landscape, a boy with brown cap, white waist dark pants, kneeling near a bonfire)
- Children with Parasol, Copyright 1907 (girl with an open parasol of red color with white border; boy: blue overalls is accompanying the girl)
- First Love, Copyright 1907 (little boy, light hair, blue eyes, seated under a tree; he is showing picture book to a little girl)
- Happy Days, Copyright 1907 (boy in blue overalls and red and white striped skirt seated in the grass on banks of brook baiting fish hook with worm)
- Mouthpiece Player, Copyright 1907 painting (boy playing a mouthpiece)
- Nibbles, Copyright 1907 (summer landscape; boy fishing, can of bait in foreground at his feet)
- Polly Want a Cracker, Copyright 1907 (boy and parrot main features; boy sitting on ground, has cracker in hand, which he is holding in front of parrot)
- Speckled Beaty, Copyright 1907, Landscape by G. Glenn, painting (little boy trying to shake fish into can)
- Sure Shot, Copyright 1907 (small boy in knickerbockers and red sweater kneeling on right knee)
- The Call, Copyright 1907 (two little boys sitting in front of barrel, used as chicken coop)
- The Duet, Copyright 1907 (two boys sitting in grass playing instruments, one boy is playing on mouth-organ, the other boy is playing a fife)
- Three Newsboys, Copyright 1907 (three boys trying to sell newspapers)
- Boy Warming His Hands, Copyright 1908, Dec 20, 1907 (boy kneeling near a fire in an empty lot)
- Boys Lighting a Paper Lantern, Copyright 1908 (one boy holding a burning match, smaller boy holding the paper lantern)
- Boys Reading a Paper, Copyright 1908 (boy holding the paper, background brick wall)
- Day is Over, Copyright 1908, Dec 20, 1907 (boy sitting near a fence, hand resting on newspapers)
- Fishing Boys, Copyright 1908 (smaller boy is showing to his bigger friend a fish which he draws out of a tin can)
- Greatest Show on Earth, Copyright 1908 (eight children under apple tree at side of barn, hanging from a trapeze, head down, is a boy)
- Paper Lantern, Copyright 1908 (bigger boy holding a lighted paper lantern, which throws u brilliant light od both boys)
- Saturday, Copyright 1908 (snub nosed, round face boy. holding fishing pole)
- Sweethearts, Copyright 1908 (wide road shaded by trees, standing under trees . . . are a little boy and a girl, boy offering a pink carnation to the girl)
- The Hustlers, Copyright 1908 (three boys at foot of elevated railway calling out papers)
- A Question, Copyright 1909 (a swing suspended from a limb of an apple-tree, girl sitting in swing and boy leaning against it)
- First Lesson, Copyright 1909, Dec 17, 1908 (girl and boy sitting near a brick wall, nearby a basket as a bed for a little dog)
- Happy Days 1909, Copyright 1909, Dec 21, 1908 (young boy in straw hat holds tied a basket with puppy in it)
- Home from Fishing, Copyright 1909 (boy jumping over a fence with bundle of fish in one hand and fish pole in the other)
- It's Up to Me 1909, Copyright (boys playing baseball)
- On the Swing 1909, Copyright (boy and girl standing on a swing suspended from a tree)
- Preparing for Xmas 1909, Copyright (winter scene showing little boy and girl, home, Christmas tree and holly)
- Taking the New Pup Home, Copyright 1909 (seated on a stump near path leading through woods is a boy holding basket containing pup)
- Campers 1910, Copyright 1910 (wood scene, two boys cooking meal over campfire, one stirring fire with long pole, two fish and cup on grass, tent at right)
- Can't You Talk?, Copyright 1910 (little girl seated on grass near big tree, left hand pointing at brown setter opposite her, trees and house in distance)
- Caught, Copyright 1910 (boy in doorway in act of catching big turkey running to the street)
- Happy Days, Copyright 1910 (boy climbing over rail fence, fishing pole in left hand, string of fish in right, stream and bushes in background)
- Last Chance, Copyright 1910 (two boys playing marbles in front of confectionery store, one down on his knees about to shoot, the other looking on)
- Leap Year, Copyright 1910 (boy and girl standing opposite each other in swing)
- Paper Sir?, Copyright 1910 (evening street scene, two newsboys running, trying to sell papers, carriage at right)
- Roastin' Taters, Copyright 1910 (two boys kneeling before fire, boy at right holds large stick, boy at left holds handkerchief containing potatoes)
- Solid Comfort, Copyright 1910 (little boy kneeling before bonfire holding hands to the fire, background of bushes and foliage)
- The Flirt, Copyright 1910 (girl standing on porch, holding in hand straw hat of boy standing below, boy holds fish pole in left hand and holds right hand to his head.hat)
- The Intruder, Copyright 1910 (old man seated at library table, at his right is small girl holding doll, and offering him an apple)
- We Won, Copyright 1910 (boy standing in grass, holding base-ball and bat)
- Will You, Copyright 1910 (little girl seated in swing in front of large tree, little boy with hands on both ropes of swing stands beside her)
- Winter Sports, Copyright 1910 (group of boys gathered around bonfire in clearing in woods, two of them have on skates and sweaters)
- Work before Play, Copyright 1910 (man and boy hoeing in cabbage patch, another boy beyond wire fence, river and trees in background)

== Exhibited ==
Karol Witkowski has exhibited his paintings in New York several times each year between 1891 and 1910. His paintings have been exhibited at auctions and galleries of New York, such as: Theodore Stewart's Sallon, Henry C. Merry Auction, Schenck Art Gallery, P. H. McMahon Auction, WM. B. Norman Auction, James P. Silo Auction, Rohlf's Gallery, Mathews's Art Galleries, John Fell O'Brien Art Galleries, Woehr Brothers Auction, Woehr Bros Gallery, John J. Pigot Galleries & Loeser Art Galleries. Also in 1909, Witkowski exhibited at State Fair of Texas.

== Gallery ==
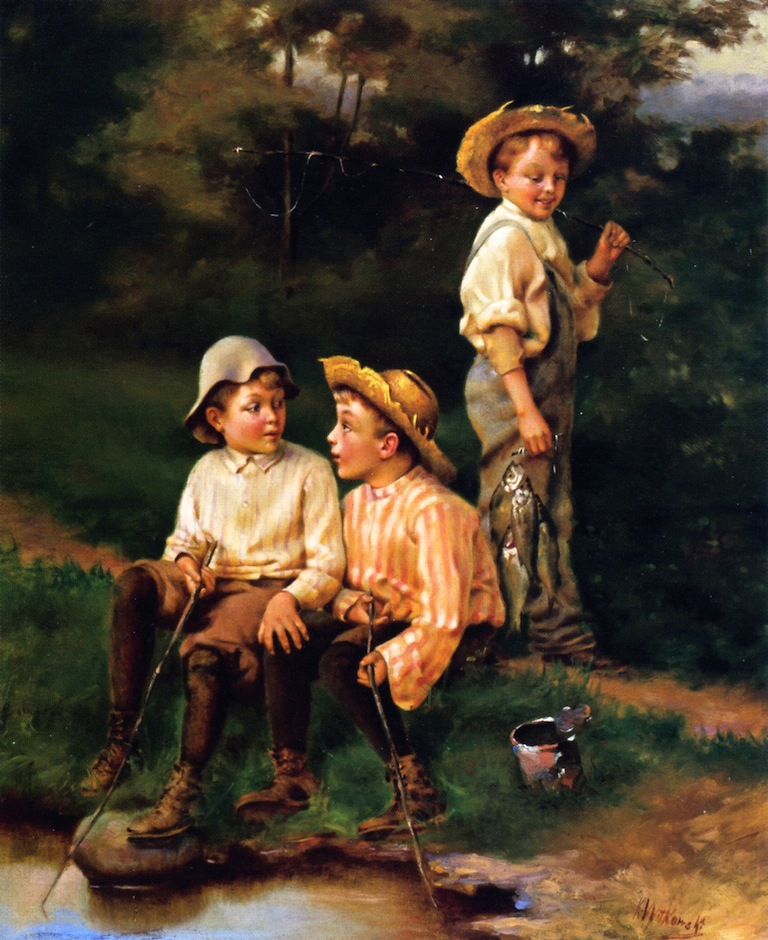
A Can of Worms

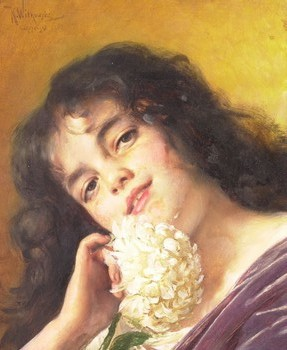
Young Woman with Chrysanthemum
1900

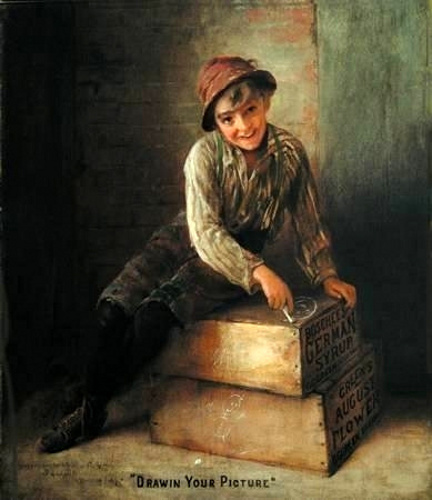
Drawin your Picture

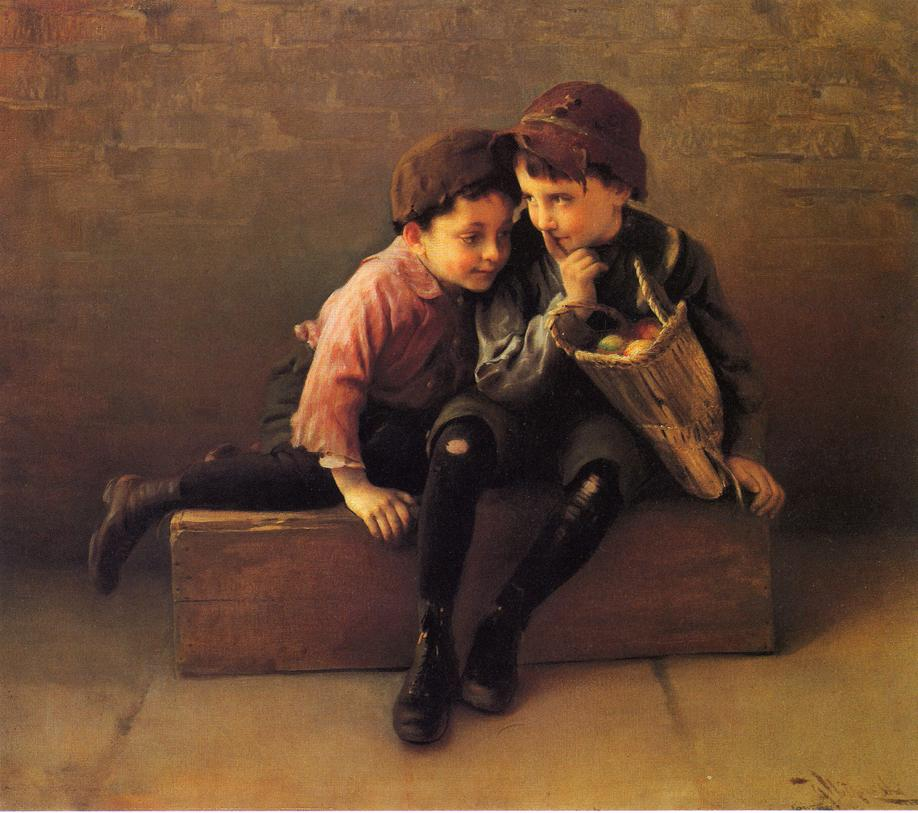
Secrets

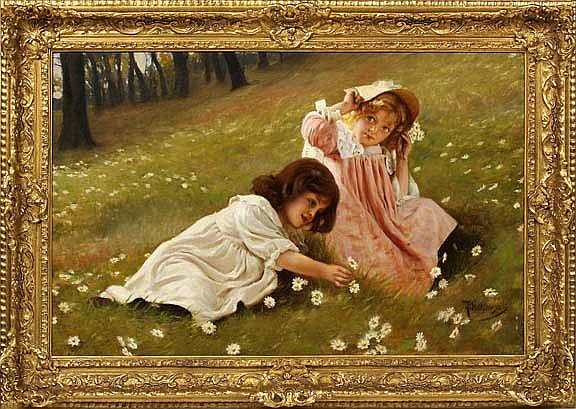
Two girls playing in a field of daisies
