= Jerzy Jazłowiecki =

Polish nobleman (szlachcic) and magnate

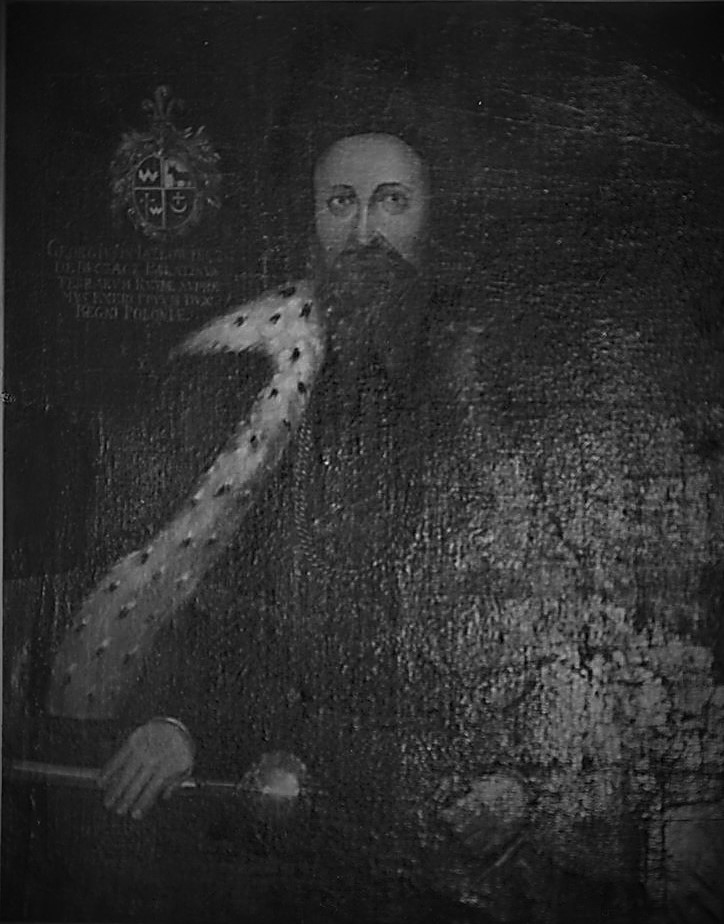
- Coat of arms: Abdank
- Born: 1510
- Died: 1575 (aged 64–65)
- Family: Jazłowiecki
- Issue: Mikołaj Jazłowiecki; Hieronim Jazłowiecki; Michał Jazłowiecki Druzjanna Jazlowiecki
- Father: Mikołaj Jazłowiecki
- Mother: Ewa Podfilipska

Jerzy Jazłowiecki (1510–1575) was a Polish nobleman (szlachcic) and magnate. Great Crown Hetman 1569–1575, Field Crown Hetman in 1569. Jerzy was voivode of the Podole Voivodeship since 1567, of the Ruthenian Voivodeship since 1569, and castellan of Kamieniec Podolski since 1564 as well.

Surname is derived from its feudal possession - city of Yazlovets (now village in Chortkiv Raion, Ternopil region, Ukraine).

In 1564 as royal emissary he was sent to Sultan Suleiman the Magnificent. During the interregnum in 1573 he was a proposed candidate of the so-called "Piast party" in the election for the Polish throne. In the late 1550s he converted to Calvinism and became an ardent supporter of the Polish Reformed Church.

Abdank Jazłowiecki coat of arms
