= Our Lady of Jazłowiec =

1883 marble statue

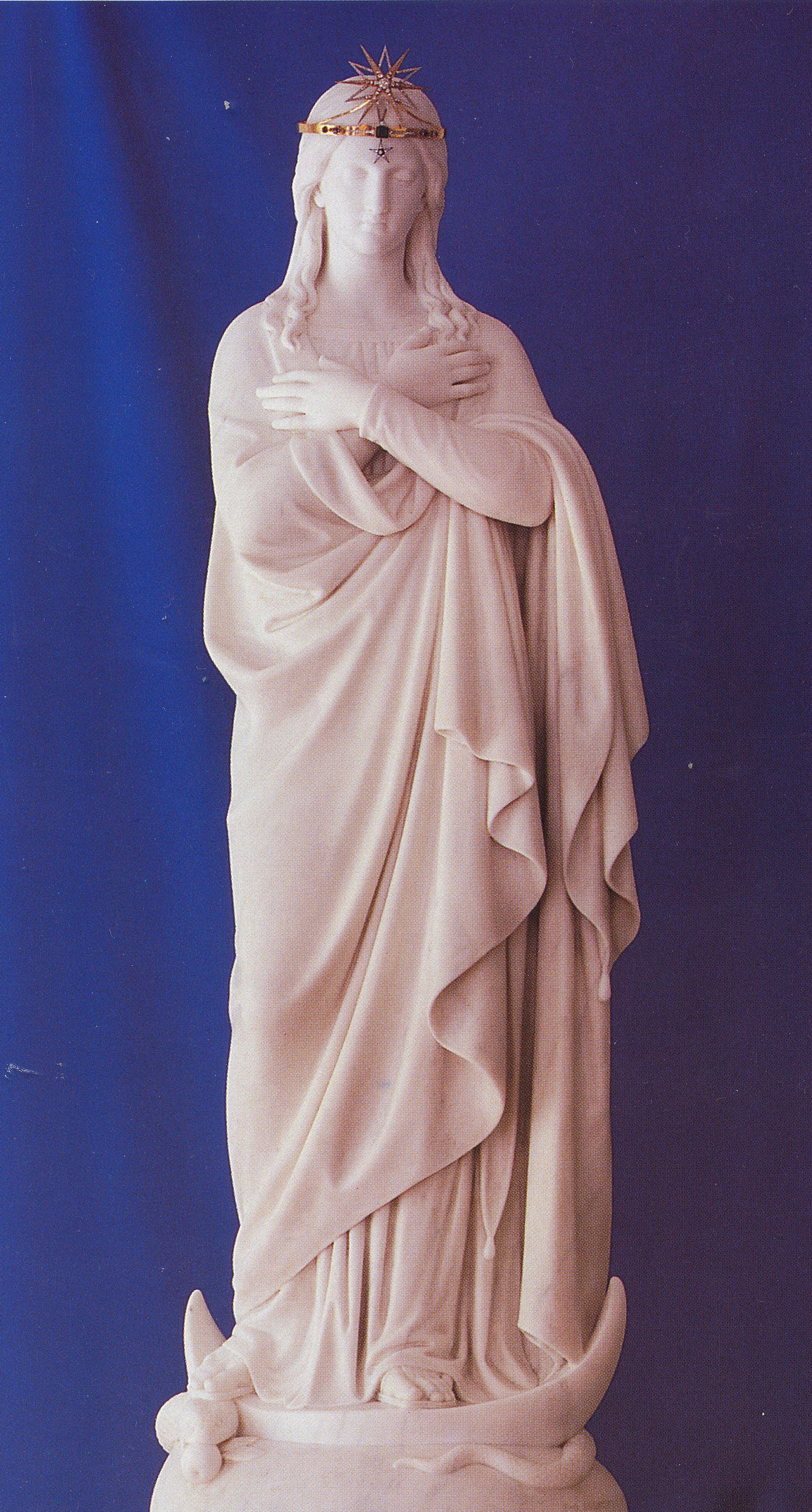
Our Lady of Jazłowiec, Tomasz Oskar Sosnowski, 1883

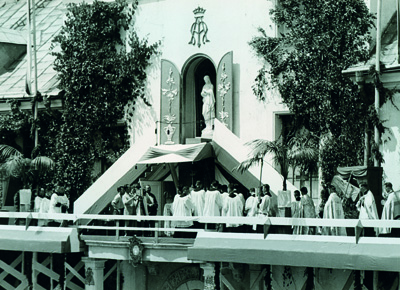
Coronation in Jazłowiec of the venerated representation of the Lady Mary in July 1939

Our Lady of Jazłowiec is an iconic representation in Carrara marble of Mary, mother of Jesus, commissioned in 1883 in Rome for the convent of the Sisters of the Immaculate Conception of the Blessed Virgin Mary in the historic village of Yazlovets, then in Austrian-occupied Poland, now in Ukraine, still a place of pilgrimage. The neoclassical carving by Tomasz Oskar Sosnowski, is 170cm high on a plinth 24cm wide.

- In 1883 the statue was blessed by Archbishop Zygmunt Szczęsny Feliński.
- In 1919 the 14th Jazlowiec Uhlan Regiment declared the image to be their Hetman.
- On 9 July 1939, the statue, granted a Canonical coronation by Pope Pius XII, was crowned by Cardinal August Hlond
- In May 1946 the statue was moved, with the remaining religious, to Szymanów in Poland.

A faithful copy of the original has since been installed in Yazlovets.

== See also ==
- List of Pontifically crowned images #Ukraine

== Bibliography ==
- Z dawna Polski Tyś Królową. Przewodnik po sanktuariach maryjnych. Szymanów, 1996 (in Polish).
