= Buczacki =

Former Polish noble family

Abdank coat of arms of the Buczacki family

The Buczacki plural: Buczaccy, feminine form: Buczacka was a Polish noble family. Magnates in the 14th and 15th century.

== Notable members ==
=== Generation 0 ===
- Michał Adwaniec of Buczacz (died 1392) – the progenitor of the family, owner of Buczacz

=== Generation 1 ===
- Michał Buczacki (died 1438) – voivode of Podlasie (1437), castellan of Halicz (1433–1437), cześnik of Halicz (1434)
- Michał Mużyło Buczacki (died 1470) – voivode of Podole (1465), castellan of Kamieniec Podolski since 1460
- Teodoryk Buczacki Jazłowiecki – castellan of Halicz, castellan of Kamieniec Podolski and starost of Podole

=== Generation 2 ===
- Jakub Buczacki (1430/1438–1501) – voivode of Ruthenia (1497), voivode of Podole (1485-1497), castellan of Halicz (1472), appointed leader of Podole and general starost of Podole (1485)
- Dawid Buczacki (died 1485) – voivode of Podole since 1481, general starost of Podole (1483), podkomorzy of Halicz since 1474, stolnik of Kamieniec Podolski since 1472, starost of Kołomyja

=== Generation 3 ===
- Jakub Buczacki (died 1541) – royal secretary (1503), parson of Lublin (1505), of Kamieniec Podolski since 1507, of Chełmno since 1518, bishop of Płock since 1538, starost of Rawa

=== 20th- century ===
- Stefan Buczacki (born 1945) - scientist based in the United Kingdom.

== Coat of arms ==
The family used the Abdank coat of arms.
