= Roman Vilhushynskyi =

Ukrainian sculptor (born 1963)

- Роман Казимирович Вільгушинський
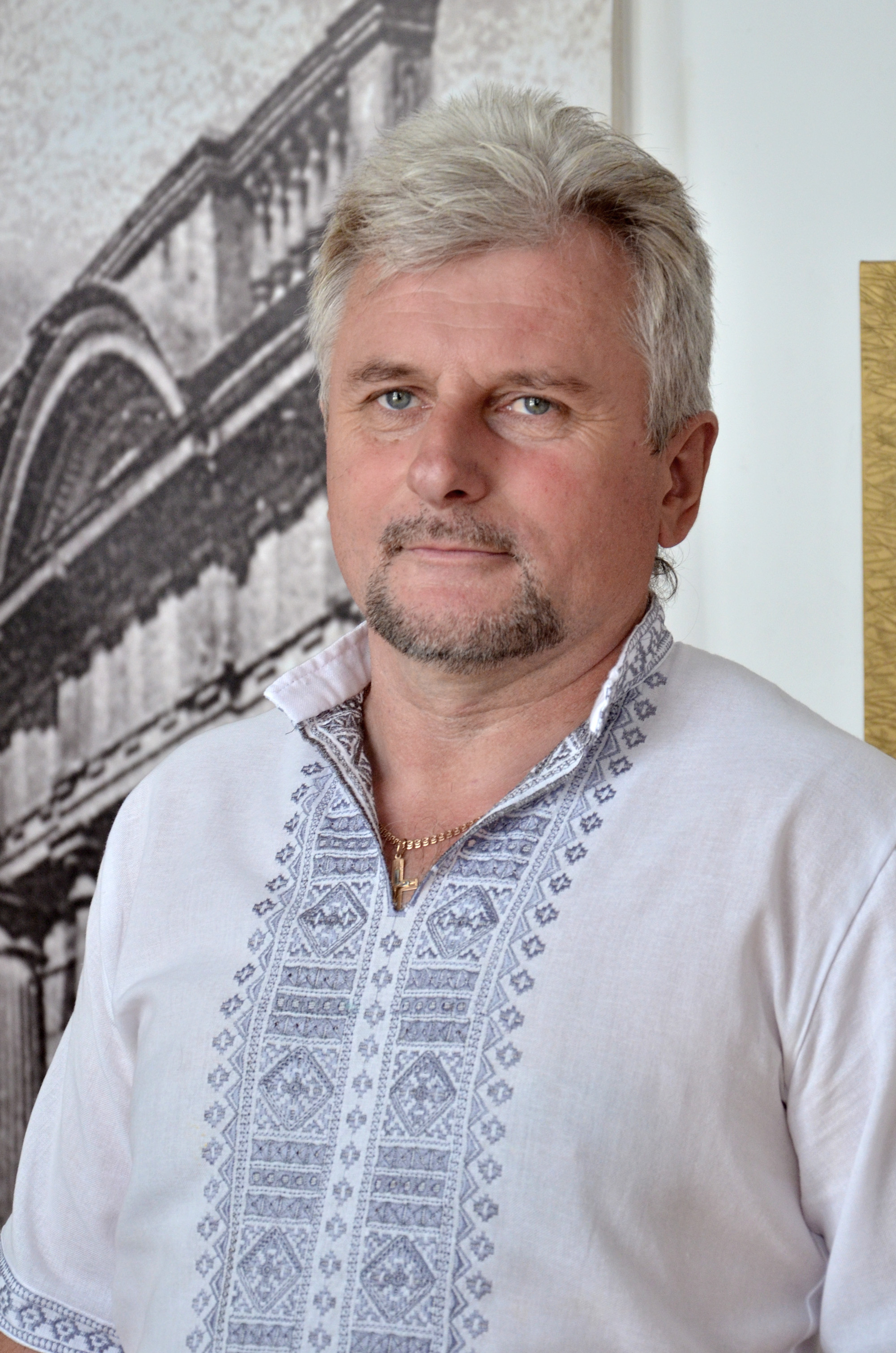
- Roman Vilhushynskyi, August 2017
- Born: 30 April 1963 (age 63); Yazlovets, now Ternopil Oblast, Ukraine
- Education: Lviv Institute of Decorative and Applied Arts
- Occupation: Sculptor
- Awards: People's Artist of Ukraine

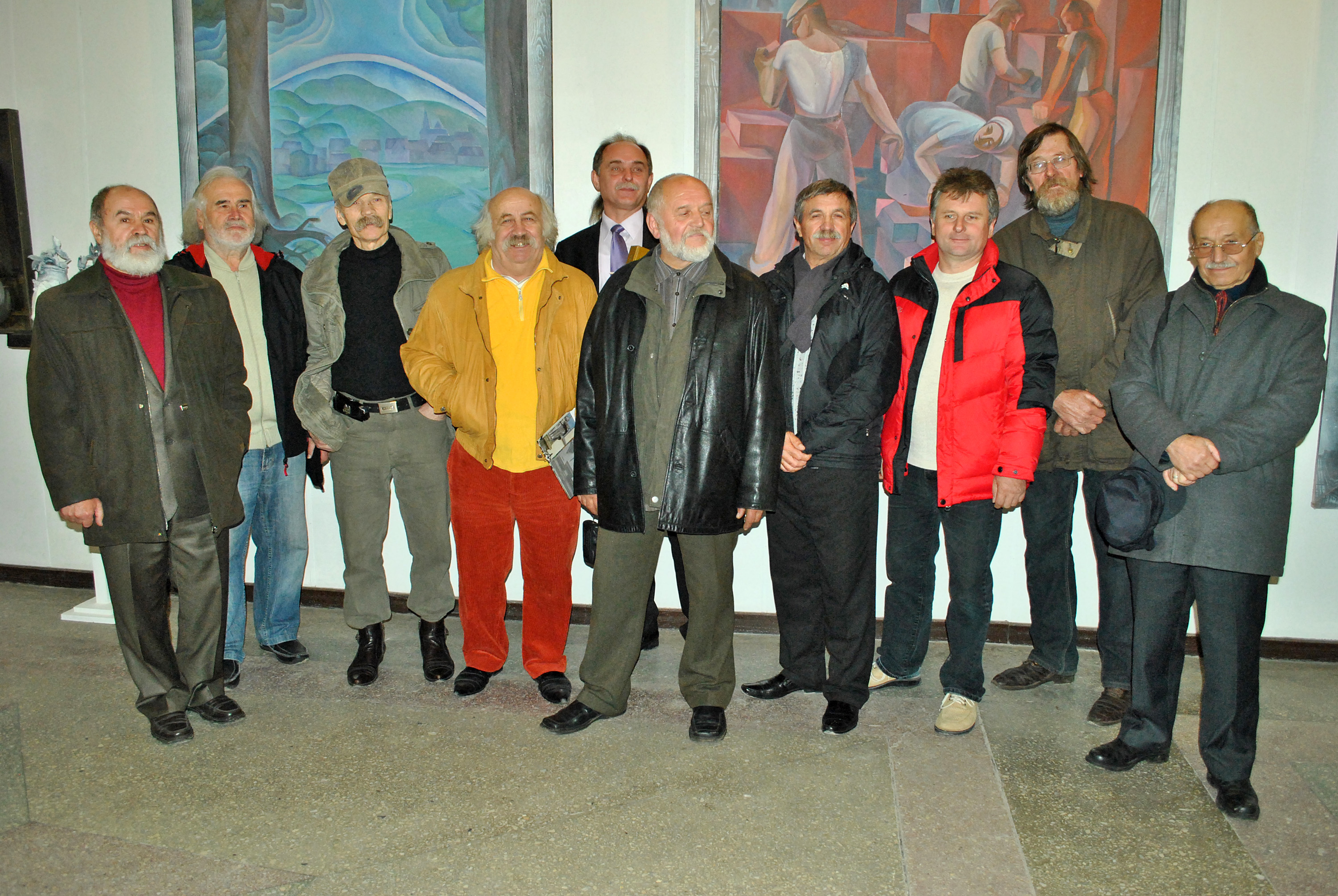
Laureates of the Mykhailo Boichuk Prize. Third from the right is Roman Vilhushynskyi.

Roman Vilhushynskyi (Ukrainian: Роман Казимирович Вільгушинський; born 30 April 1963) is a Ukrainian sculptor. Member of the National Union of Artists of Ukraine (1994).

== Biography ==
Roman Kazymyrovych Vilgushynsky was born on 30 April 1963 in the village of Yablunivka, Buchach Raion, Ternopil Oblast (now Yazlovets, Chortkiv Raion, Ukraine).

From 1984 to 1989, he studied at the Lviv Institute of Decorative and Applied Arts (specializing in artistic ceramics; teachers: Dmytro Krvavych, Ivan Frank). Now - docent of the Department of Fine Arts, Design, and Teaching Methods at Ternopil Volodymyr Hnatiuk National Pedagogical University.

He has lived in Ternopil from 1989. He works in the field of monumental and easel sculpture.

Solo exhibitions in Ternopil (1996, 1998). Participant in exhibitions in Ternopil, Kyiv, Lviv, and other cities.

== Selected works ==
=== Easel sculptures ===
- "Svitla postat" (1996)
- "Vidpochynok amazonky" (1996)
- "Kupalnytsia" (1998, artificial stone)
- "Tors" (2000)
- "Filosofskyi kamin"

=== Monumental sculptures ===
- busts of Taras Shevchenko
  - in Bohdanivka, Pidvolochysk settlement hromada, Ternopil Raion (1991),
  - in Sokoliv, Chortkiv Raion (1998);
- monuments
  - Tymotei Borduliak, Velykyi Khodachkiv, Ternopil Raion (1992)
  - Stepan Bandera, Terebovlia (1999)
  - Monument to Jesus Christ, Buchach (2003)
  - Patriarch Josyf Slipyj, Ternopil (2004, architect Anatolii Vodopian, consecrated with the participation of His Eminence Cardinal Liubomyr Huzar)
  - Stepan Bandera, Ternopil (2008)
  - Anna Dorota Chrzanowska, Terebovlia (2012)
  - Johann Georg Pinsel, Buchach (opened and consecrated on 16 November 2014)
  - Monument of Nebesna Sotnia, Ternopil (opened and consecrated on 14 October 2016).
  - Karl Emil Franzos, Chortkiv (2017)
- memorial complexes
  - to soldiers of the Ukrainian Galician Army, Terebovlia (1993)
  - in honor of Ukraine's declaration of independence, Nastasiv, Ternopil Raion (1994)
  - "On the Shield into Eternity" memorial to law enforcement officers who lost their lives in the war (Ternopil, 2025)
- memorial plaques
  - to Mykola Chaikovskyi (2013)
- memorial signs to UPA soldiers
  - Zarvanytsia, Ternopil Raion
  - Vyshnivchyk, Ternopil Raion
- sculptures of the Guardian Angel
  - Pidvolochysk,
  - Zavodske, Chortkiv Raion
- others
  - Roadside statue of the Virgin Mary with the baby Jesus in her arms in Buchach, near the Saints Peter and Paul church (2005, consecrated on the Sunday before the Feast of the Intercession)
  - bas-relief of Nazarii Voitovych in Ternopil, on the facade of the Ternopil Cooperative Trade and Economic College (2015)
  - Sculptural composition for the Ukrainian Jerusalem "Angel", Spiritual Center in Zarvanytsia, Ternopil Oblast (Limestone, 2017).

Among the interesting works is the creation in 2006 of a copy of the sculpture "Saint Onuphrius", which was originally created by the outstanding Rococo-era artist Johann Georg Pinsel. The copy was transferred to the Borys Voznytsky Lviv National Art Gallery due to the limited accessibility of the original for researchers and art enthusiasts. This is not the first time Roman Vilhushynskyi has turned to the work of the famous predecessor from the mid-18th century. Among his new tasks are copies of the decorative sculptures that adorn the roof of the Buchach City Hall. Some of these were destroyed or significantly damaged by fire. The sculptor is attempting to restore the damaged works, which will make it possible to preserve the originals in a museum and display the copies in their original locations on the town hall roof.

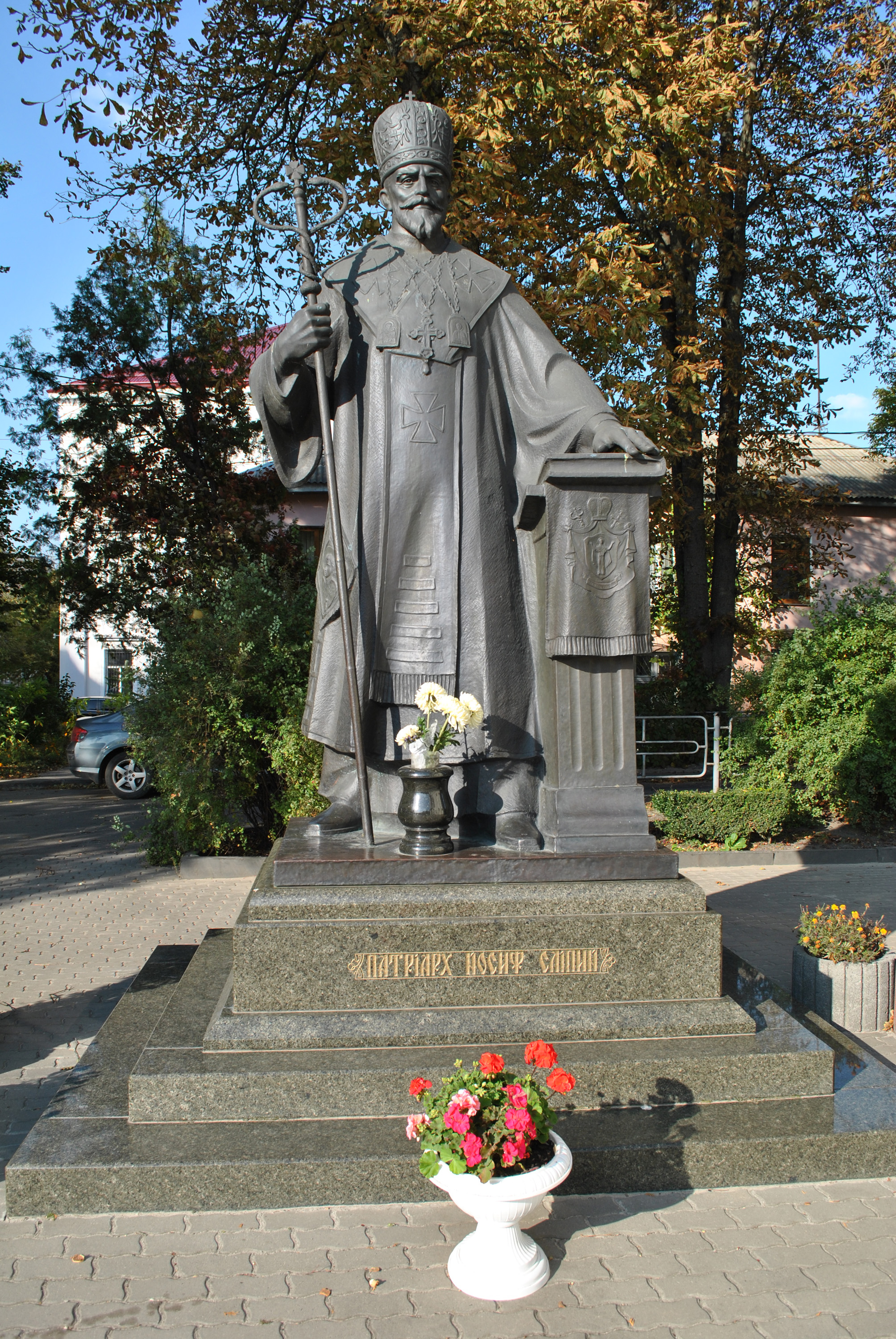
Statue of Yosyf Slipyi, Ternopil

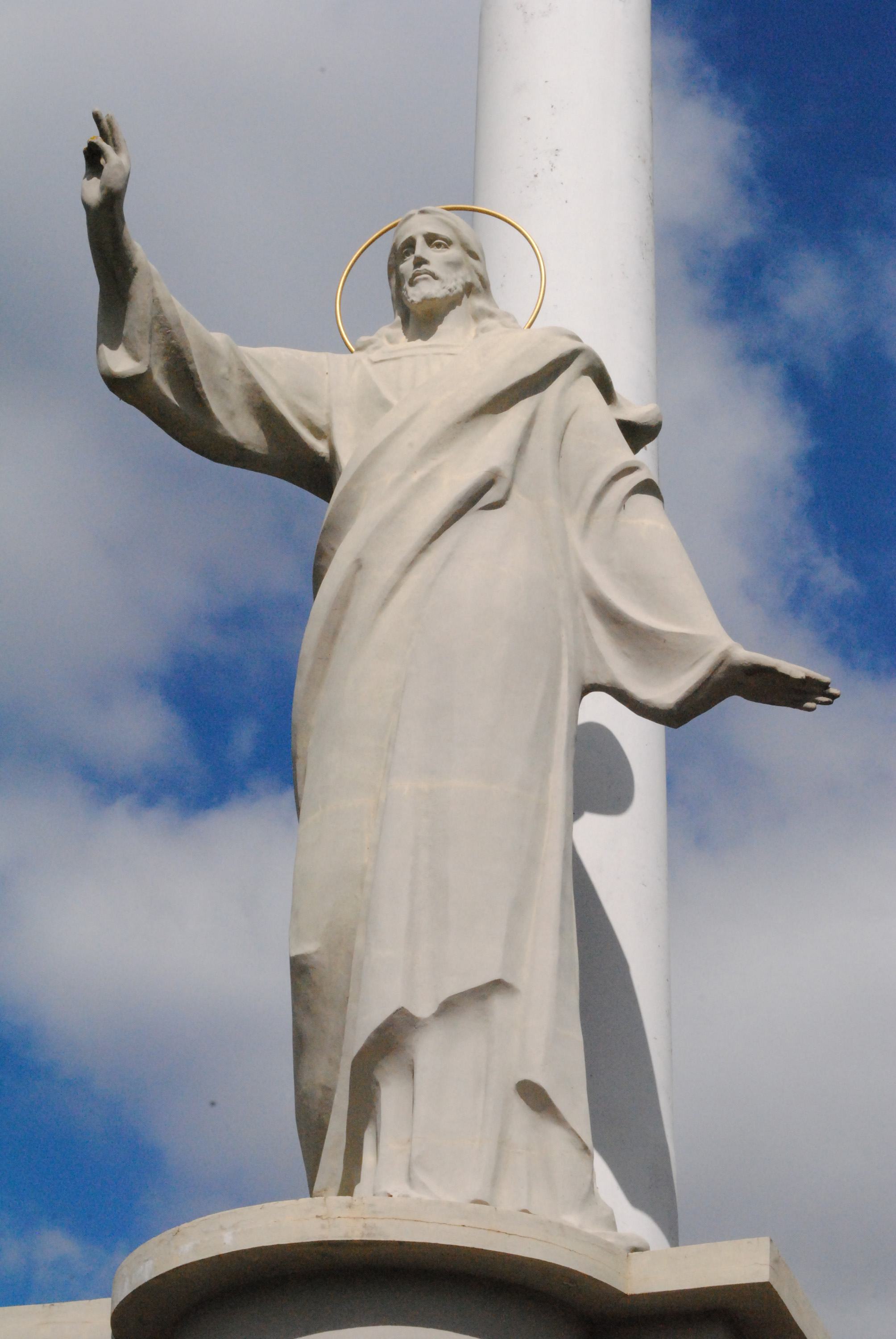
Statue of Jesus, Buchach

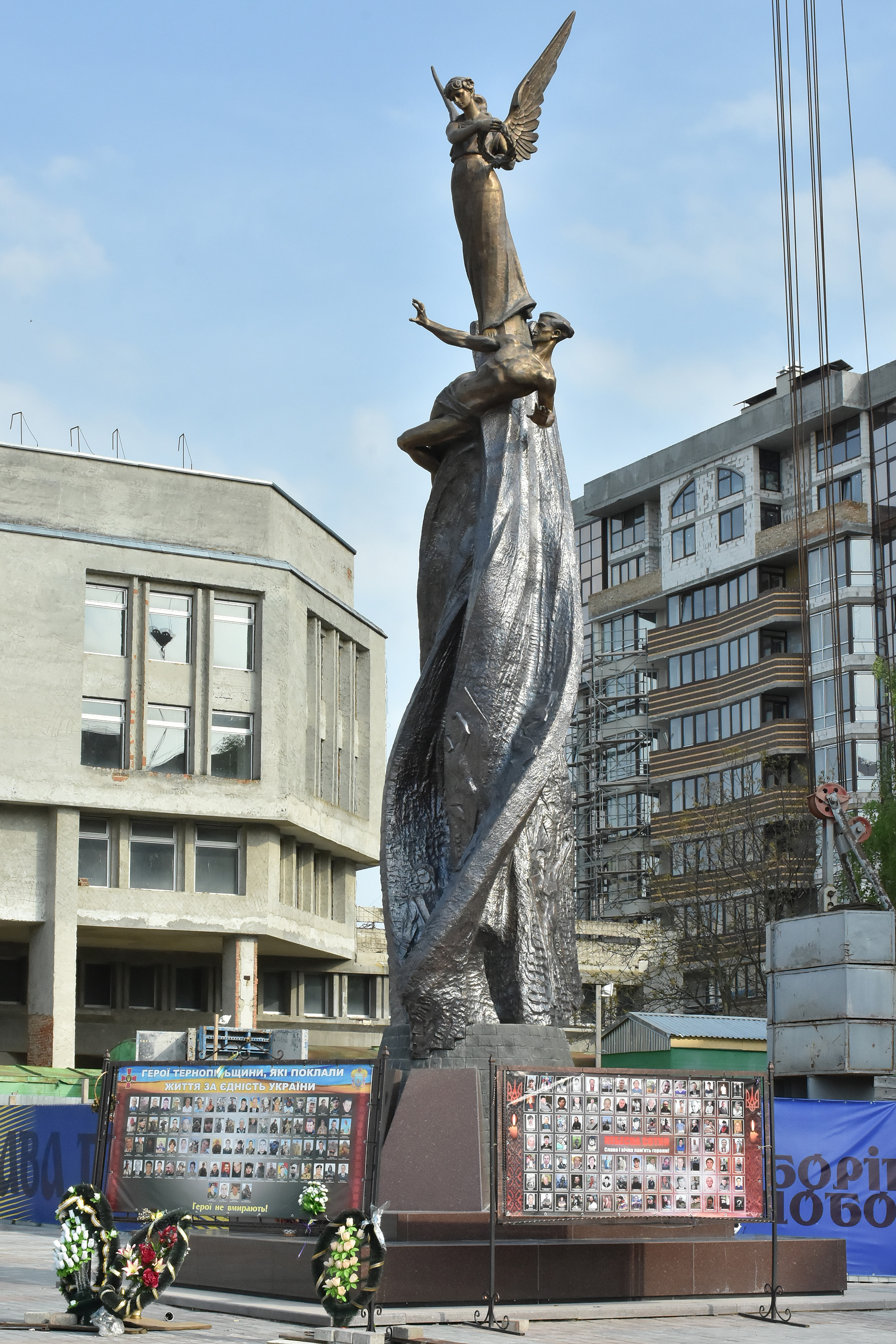
Monument of Nebesna Sotnia, Ternopil

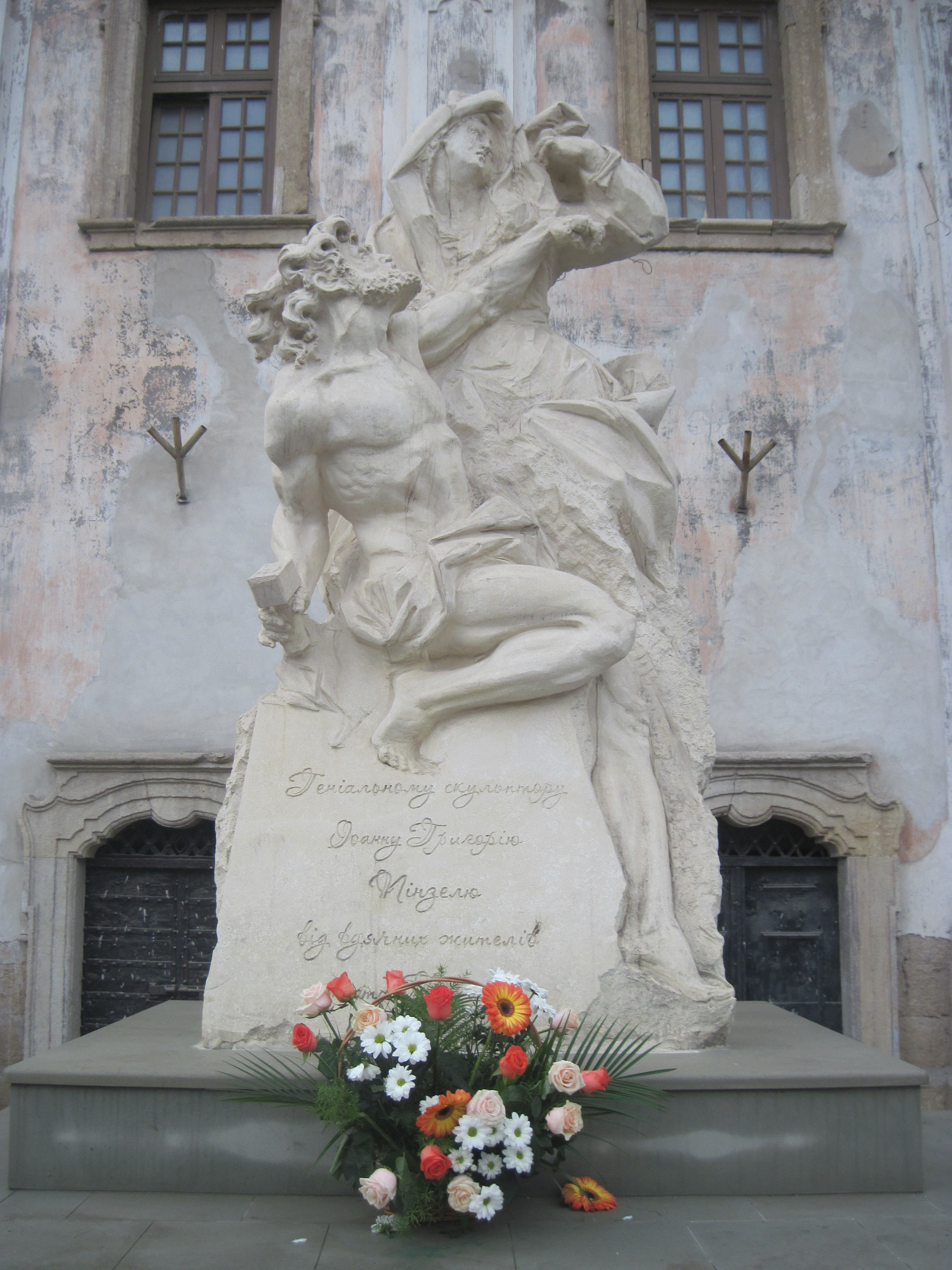
Monument of Johann Georg Pinsel, Buchach

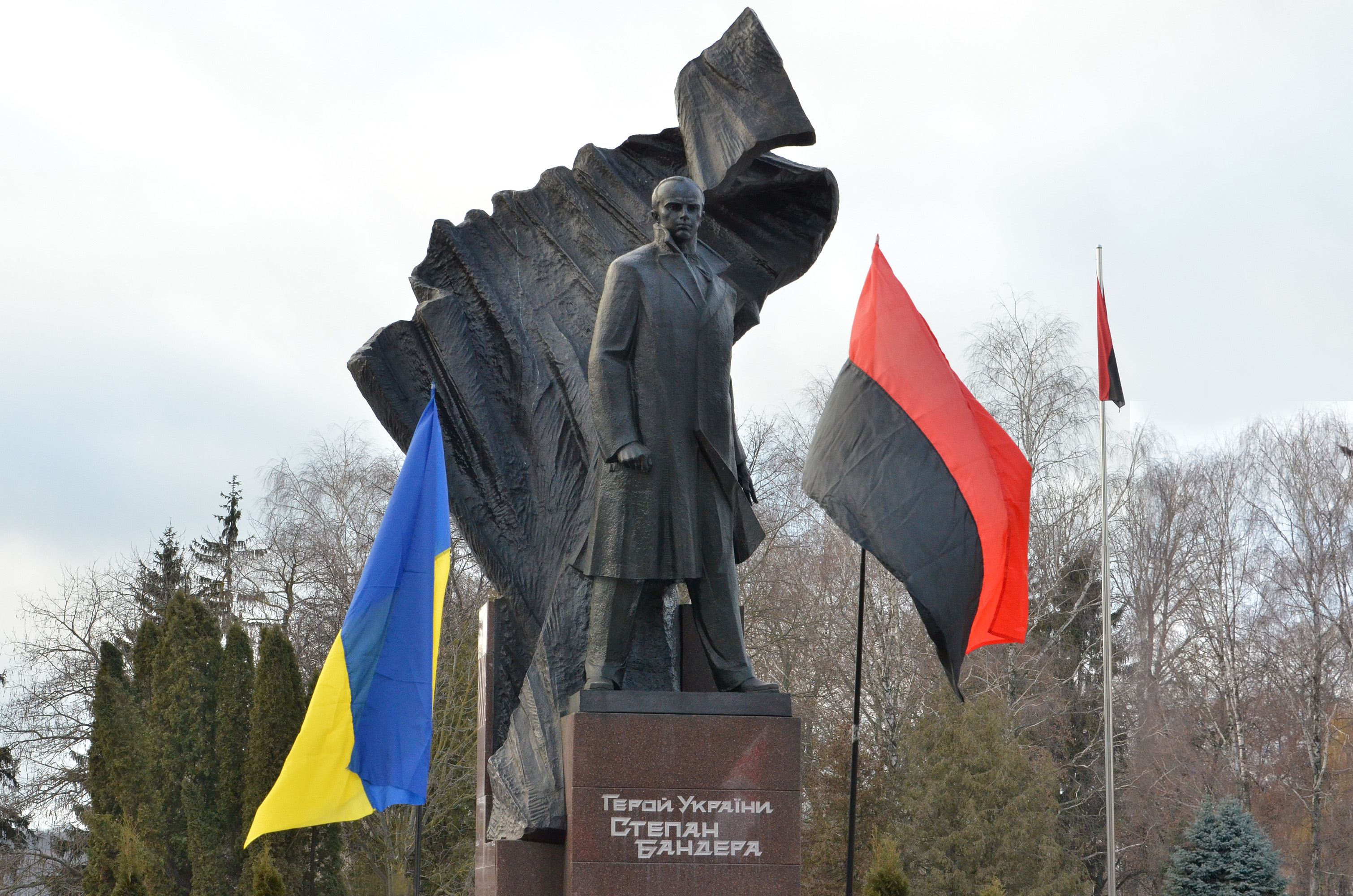
Statue of Stepan Bandera, Ternopil

== Awards ==
- Merited Painter of Ukraine (2009).
- People's Artist of Ukraine (2020).
- Mykhailo Boichuk Prize (2004).

== Bibliography ==
- Vilhushynskyi Roman Kazymyrovych / T. O. Udina // Encyclopedia of Modern Ukraine [Online] / Eds. : I.М. Dziuba, A.I. Zhukovsky, M.H. Zhelezniak [et al.]; National Academy of Sciences of Ukraine, Shevchenko Scientific Society. – Kyiv: The NASU institute of Encyclopedic Research, 2005, upd. 2020.
- (in Ukrainian) Мельничук Б., Вільгушинський Роман Казимирович // Ternopil Encyclopedic Dictionary: in 4 v. / editorial board: H. Yavorskyi and other, Ternopil: "Zbruch", 2004, V. 1: А—Й, S. 280. — ISBN 966-528-197-6.
