= Kapinos =

Kapinos is a surname of Ukrainian and Polish origin. Notable people with the surname include:

- Jeremy Kapinos (born 1984), former American football player
- Oleksandr Kapinos (1984–2014), Ukrainian political activist
- Tom Kapinos (born 1969), American television writer and screenwriter
