= Pavlo Bekhta =

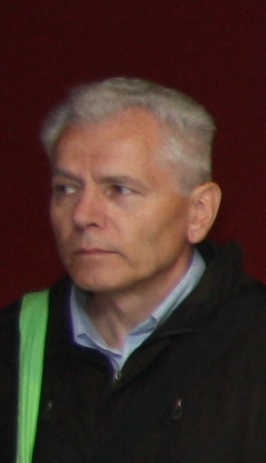
- Born: March 26, 1960 (age 66); Bortiatyn, Ukraine
- Awards: Fellow, IAWS (2022); Distinction, Elsevier Data (2024)
- Scientific career
- Fields: Wood-based composites
- Workplaces: Ukrainian National Forestry University

Pavlo Bekhta (born 1960) is a Ukrainian wood scientist, professor, and head of the Department of Wood-Based Composites, Cellulose and Paper at the Ukrainian National Forestry University in Lviv at Ukraine, who is an elected fellow (FIAWS) of the International Academy of Wood Science

== Early life ==
Pavlo Antonovych Bekhta was born on March 26, 1960, in the village of Bortiatyn, Mostyska District, Lviv Oblast in Ukraine. He lived in Bortiatyn, where he completed his secondary education. He studied forestry in the Ukrainian National Forestry University, specialising in wood science and technology.

== Research career ==
Bekhta got his PhD in wood technology and has been active in research and teaching in the field of wood sciences since 1996. His research work has primarily focused on:

- Thermal and physical modification of wood.
- Mechanical and environmental performance of plywood, particleboard and MDF.
- Development of formaldehyde-free and bio-based adhesives.
- Optimization of hot pressing and densification techniques.

Along with his research team, he has authored more than 150 scientific publications, many of which are indexed in international databases such as Scopus and Web of Science, having more than 3,500 citations at Google Scholar. His research has been on the sustainable and innovative wood-based materials.

He is an elected member of the Ukrainian Academy of Technical Sciences, and also a contributor to international scientific committees in the field of wood science. However, in 2023, due to the war, he has taken a senior-researcher position at the Technical University in Zvolen, Slovakia, at the Department of Furniture and Wood Products.

In August 2024, a meta-research carried out by John Ioannidis et al. at the Stanford University, included Dr. Pavlo Bekhta in the Elsevier Data 2023, where he was ranked at the top 2% of researchers globally in the area of wood sciences (forestry – materials).

== Selected publications ==
- Bekhta, P. & Niemz, P. (2003). "Effect of high temperature on the change in color, dimensional stability and mechanical properties of spruce wood." Holzforschung, 57(5), 539–546. DOI (1,077 cit.)
- Bekhta, P. et al. (2009). "Properties of plywood manufactured from compressed veneer as building material." Materials & Design, 30(4), 947-953. Properties of plywood manufactured from compressed veneer as building material (164 cit.)
