= Velyki Berezhtsi =

Velyki Berezhtsi Великі Бережці
- Village
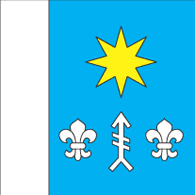
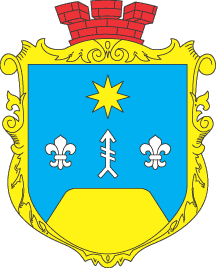
- Flag Coat of arms
- Interactive map of Velyki Berezhtsi
- Coordinates: 50°05′50″N 25°36′15″E
- Country: Ukraine
- Oblast: Ternopil Oblast
- Raion: Kremenets Raion
- Silska Rada: Velyki Berezhtsi Rada
- Founded: 1545

Area
  - Total: 3.804 km^{2} (1.469 sq mi)
- Elevation: 240 m (790 ft)

Population (2001)
  - Total: 1,011
  - Density: 267/km^{2} (690/sq mi)
- Time zone: UTC+2 (EET)
  - Summer (DST): UTC+3 (EEST)
- Postal code: 47020
- Area code: +380 3546

Velyki Berezhtsi (Ukrainian: Великі Бережці) is a village in Kremenets Raion, Ternopil Oblast, Ukraine. In 2001, the community had 1011 residents. It belongs to Kremenets urban hromada, one of the hromadas of Ukraine. The postal code is 47020.

The village was first recorded in 1545.

Village remembers Kresowa księga sprawiedliwych on page 74.
