= Horodok, Rivne Raion =

Horodok Городок
- Village
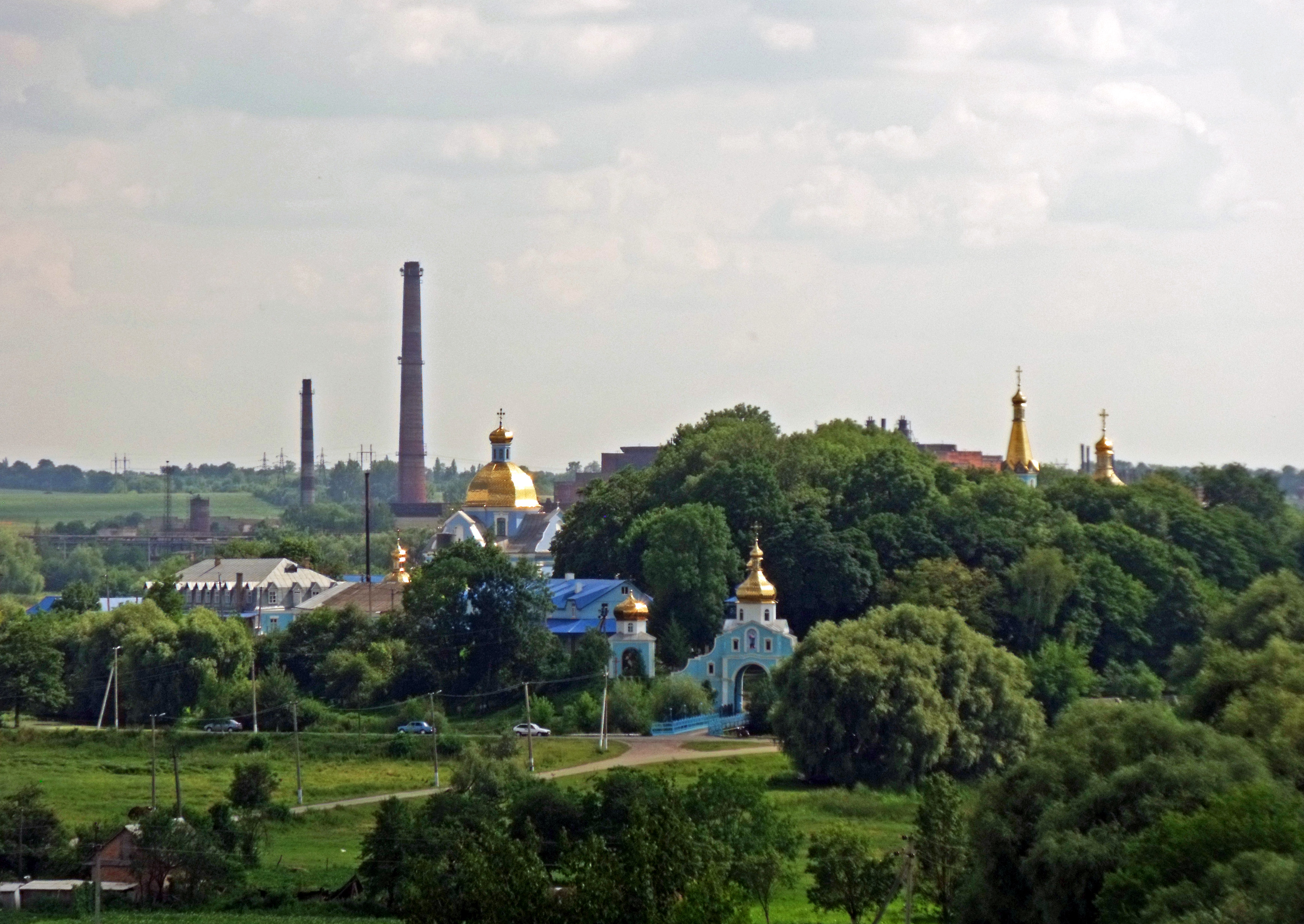
- Architectural and park complex

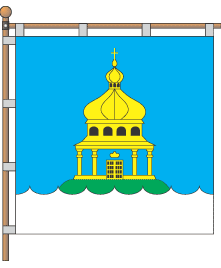
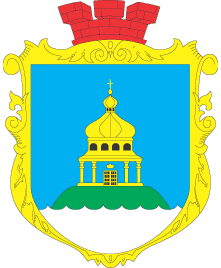
- Flag Coat of arms

- Location within Ukraine Horodok (Rivne Oblast)
- Coordinates: 50°40′59″N 26°11′33″E
- Country: Ukraine
- Oblast: Rivne Oblast
- Raion: Rivne Raion
- Hromada: Horodok rural hromada

Area
  - Total: 1.72 km^{2} (0.66 sq mi)
- Elevation: 178 m (584 ft)

Population (2001)
  - Total: 2,719
  - Density: 1,587/km^{2} (4,110/sq mi)
- Time zone: UTC+2 (EET)
  - Summer (DST): UTC+3 (EEST)
- Postal code: 35331
- Area code: +380 362

Horodok (Ukrainian: Городок) is a village in Rivne Raion, Rivne Oblast, Ukraine. It is located on the Ustia river. In 2001, the community had 2719 residents.

== History ==
The area of Horodok contains archaeological sites dating from paleolithic, eneolithic and neolithic periods. Other finds stem from the Corded Ware culture and times of Kyivan Rus. Numerous archaeological excavations took place in Horodok during the 1920s.

In 1902 a museum was founded in Horodok by Teodor Shteingel, an alumnus of the University of Kyiv, who donated his valuable archaeological, historical and ethnographic collections from Volhynia, including finds from Rus'-era tombs excavated at Studynets in modern-day Rivne Oblast. The museum functioned in the building of a former Greek Catholic monastery until the First World War.

The village is remembered in the Kresowa księga sprawiedliwych on page 87 (Horodok, Rivne Raion).

== Notable people ==
- Volodymyr Oskilko (1892-1926), Ukrainian military officer
