= Bilokrynytsia Palace =

Palace in Bilokrynytsia, Ukraine

- Білокриницький палац
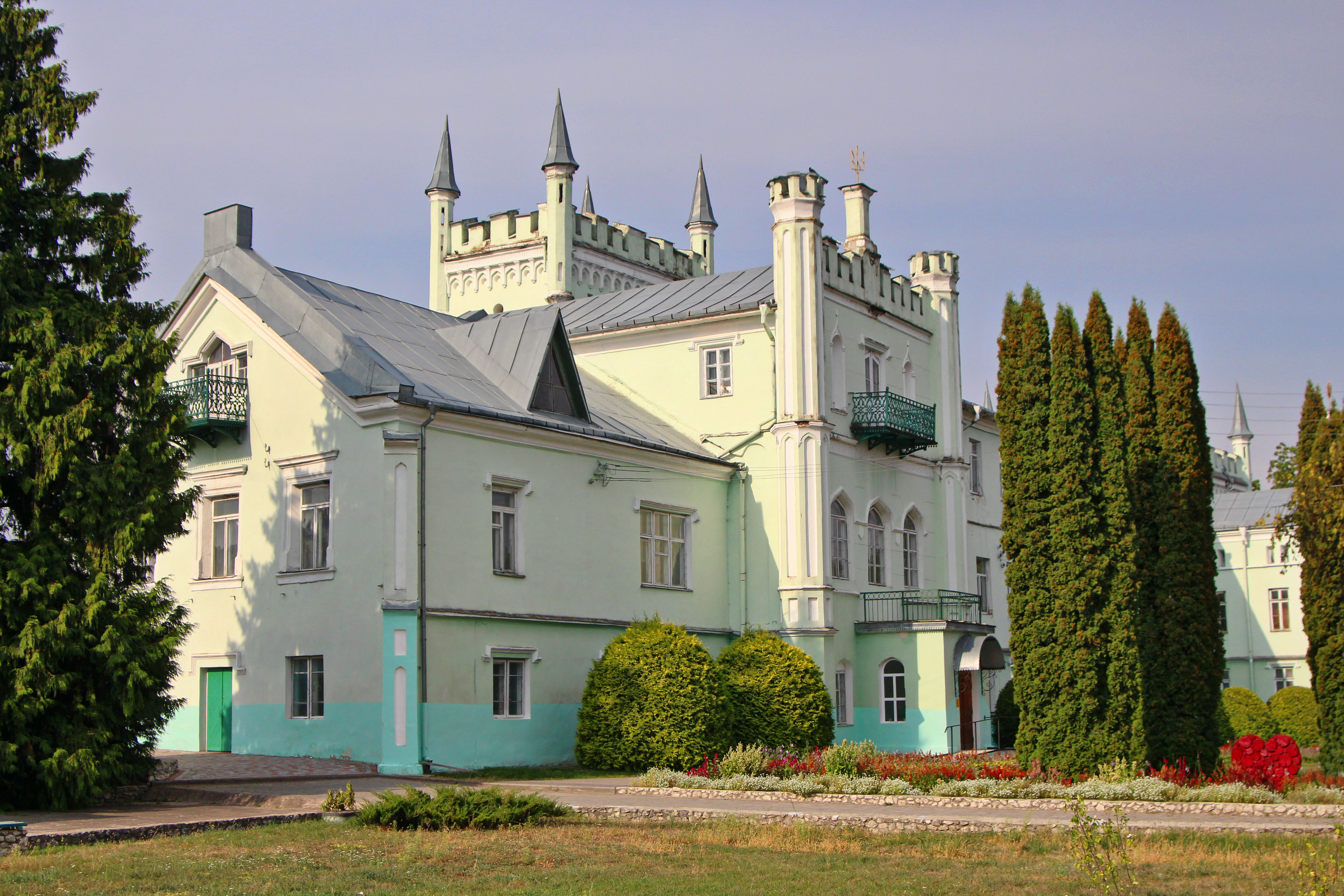
- Bilokrynytsia Palace
- Interactive map of the Bilokrynytsia Palace area

General information
- Status: Architectural monument of local importance
- Location: Bilokrynytsia, Kremenets Raion, Ternopil Oblast, Ukraine
- Coordinates: 50°08′24″N 25°44′46″E

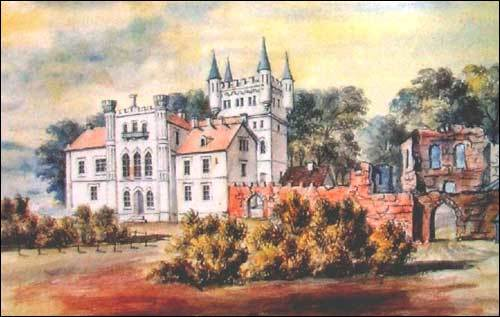
Palace in Bilokrynytsia, Napoleon Orda

Bilokrynytsia Palace (Ukrainian: Білокриницький палац) is the original castle in Bilokrynytsia of the Ternopil Oblast, built in the 16th century by the Zbaraski family, and an architectural monument of local importance.

== History ==
In the 16th century the village came under the rule of the Zbaraski family, who built a castle here. The construction work was led by Prince Andrzej Zbaraski (c. 1498–1540), and continued by his son Mikolaj Zbaraski (c. 1540–1574). The fortress, razed to the ground by the Tatars, was raised from the ruins in 1606. After Rev. Jerzy Zbaraski, the Grand Landlord of the Crown, Grand Chamberlain of the Crown, Castellan of Kraków, starosta of Pinsk, Sokal and Radohow in 1631, the owners of the stronghold were the Wiśniowiecki family and then the Radziwill family from 1725, who received it in a bequest. In 1806 the castle, which was owned by Dominik Radziwill (1786–1813), burned down and stood in ruins for a long time.

== Palace ==
Subsequent owners Czosnowski, after the 1806 conflagration, rebuilt the fortress into a palace, leaving parts of the ruins. Around 1866 Czosnowski was arrested by the tsarist authorities for his participation in the 1863 uprising and the castle was sold at auction. Along with 4,500 acres of land, it was bought by Count Aleksander Woronin, a governor-general and secret counselor and officer for especially important affairs in Kyiv. In 1862–1876 the village was visited by the famous artist Napoleon Orda (1807–1883), who depicted the palace and castle period in his drawings, when the palace had not yet been rebuilt and the old castle had not been completely destroyed. The current palace was built in the 17th century, and its appearance is the result of a major reconstruction in neo-Gothic style in the late 19th century. The new palace was almost three times larger than the previous one. Of course, at that time the stone ruins of the old castle were destroyed, hindering construction. Before World War II, the State Secondary Agricultural School operated here. Today it houses a forestry technical college and what remains of the castle are the defensive walls, ditches and ramparts.

== Architecture ==
In the 17th century, the castle was built on a quadrangular plan with earthen bastions at the corners. Outside the castle were dug moats and the defensive walls and fortifications were of stone. It is likely that one of the castle's curtain walls adjoined the rooms of the palace along with the rest of the walls, where residential and commercial buildings could be located.
