= Dunaiv, Ternopil Oblast =

Rural locality in Ternopil Oblast, Ukraine

Dunaiv Дунаїв
- Village
- Location in Ternopil Oblast
- Coordinates: 50°3′30″N 25°35′24″E
- Country: Ukraine
- Oblast: Ternopil Oblast
- Raion: Kremenets Raion
- Hromada: Kremenets urban hromada
- Time zone: UTC+2 (EET)
  - Summer (DST): UTC+3 (EEST)
- Postal code: 47023

Dunaiv (Ukrainian: Дунаїв) is a village in the Kremenets urban hromada of the Kremenets Raion of Ternopil Oblast in Ukraine.

== History ==
The first written mention of the village was in 1493.

== Religion ==
- St. Demetrius church (1879, wooden).

== Notable residents ==
- Oleksandr Kapinos (1984–2014), Hero of Ukraine, participant of the Revolution of Dignity.

== Sources ==
- (in Ukrainian) Грищук М., Мельничук Б., Дунаїв // Ternopil Encyclopedic Dictionary: in 4 v. / editorial board: H. Yavorskyi and other, Ternopil: "Zbruch", 2004, V. 1: А—Й, S. 545. — ISBN 966-528-197-6.
- "Dunajów". Geographical Dictionary of the Kingdom of Poland (in Polish). p. 452.
