= Novyi Kokoriv =

Rural locality in Ternopil Oblast, Ukraine

Novyi Kokoriv Новий Кокорів
- Village
- Interactive map of Novyi Kokoriv
- Location in Ternopil Oblast
- Coordinates: 50°1′14″N 25°38′14″E
- Country: Ukraine
- Oblast: Ternopil Oblast
- Raion: Kremenets Raion
- Hromada: Kremenets urban hromada
- Time zone: UTC+2 (EET)
  - Summer (DST): UTC+3 (EEST)
- Postal code: 47034

Novyi Kokoriv (Ukrainian: Новий Кокорів) is a village in the Kremenets urban hromada of the Kremenets Raion of Ternopil Oblast in Ukraine. After the liquidation of the Kremenets Raion (1940–2020) on 19 July 2020, the village became part of the Kremenets Raion.

== Bibliography ==
- (in Ukrainian) Бігус М., Хаварівський Б., Новий Кокорів // Ternopil Encyclopedic Dictionary: in 4 v. / editorial board: H. Yavorskyi and other, Ternopil: "Zbruch", 2005, V. 2: К—О, S. 639. — ISBN 966-528-199-2.
