= Bilokrynytsia, Kremenets Raion, Ternopil Oblast =

Rural locality in Ternopil Oblast, Ukraine

Bilokrynytsia Білокриниця
- Location in Ternopil Oblast
- Coordinates: 50°08′34″N 25°44′58″E
- Country: Ukraine
- Oblast: Ternopil Oblast
- Raion: Kremenets Raion
- Hromada: Kremenets urban hromada
- Time zone: UTC+2 (EET)
  - Summer (DST): UTC+3 (EEST)
- Postal code: 47013

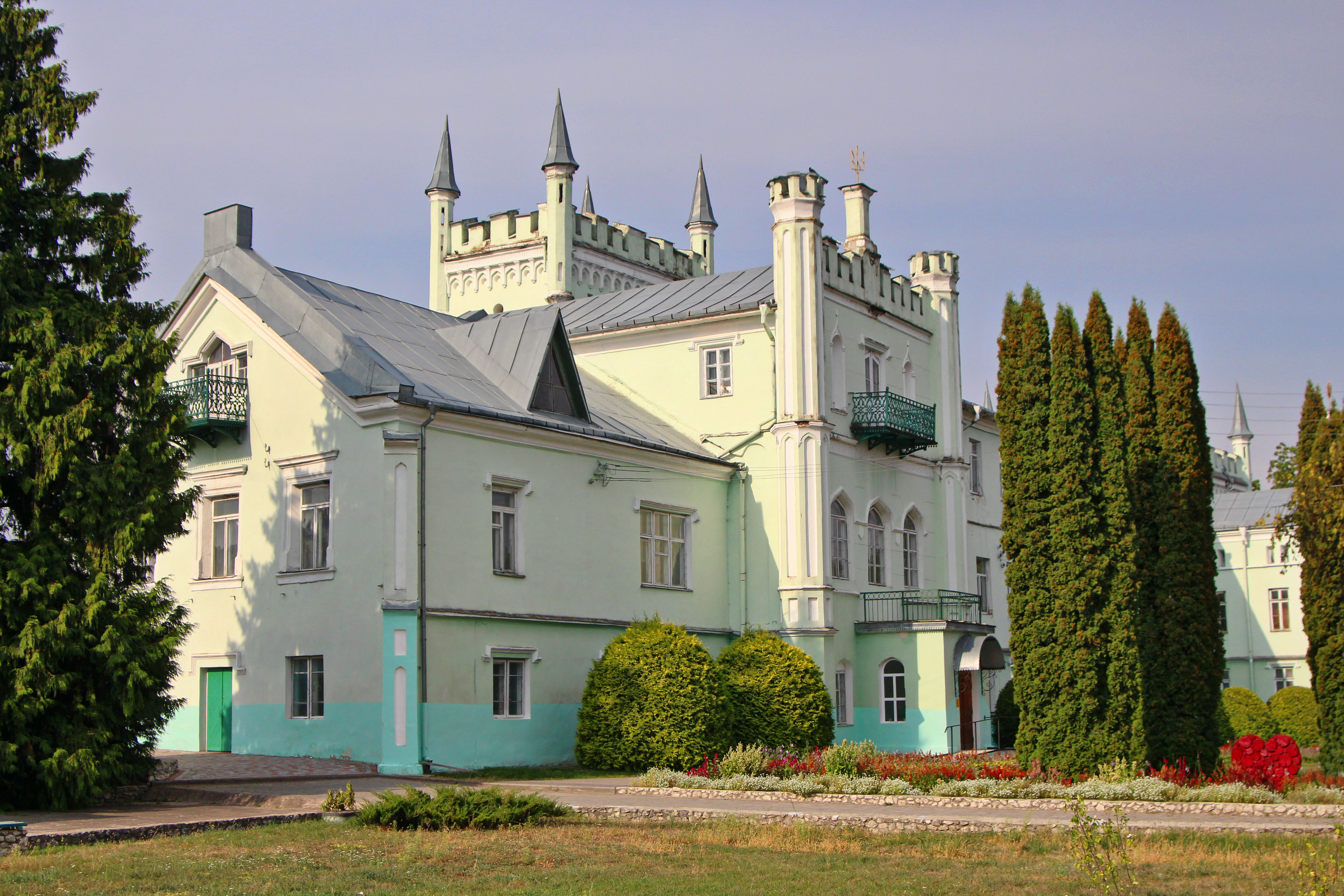
A monument in the village

Bilokrynytsia (Ukrainian: Білокриниця) is a village in the Kremenets urban hromada of the Kremenets Raion of Ternopil Oblast in Ukraine.

== History ==
The first written mention of the village was in 1438.

== Religion ==
- Saint John the Baptist church (1890, brick).

== Monuments ==
- Bilokrynytsia Palace

== Notable residents ==
The village was visited by Taras Shevchenko, Lesya Ukrainka, Tadeusz Stecki, and President of Ukraine Leonid Kuchma.

At the local cemetery, Ukrainian military journalist Dmytro Labutkin is buried.

== Sources ==
- (in Ukrainian) Мазурчук В., Уніят В., Чернихівський Г., Білокриниця // Ternopil Encyclopedic Dictionary: in 4 v. / editorial board: H. Yavorskyi and other, Ternopil: "Zbruch", 2004, V. 1: А—Й, S. 136. — ISBN 966-528-197-6.
- "Białokrynica (1)". Geographical Dictionary of the Kingdom of Poland (in Polish). p. 127.
