= Kolosova, Kremenets Raion, Ternopil Oblast =

Kolosova Колосова
- Village
- Location within Ternopil Oblast Location within Ukraine
- Coordinates: 50°02′09″N 25°41′31″E
- Country: Ukraine
- Oblast: Ternopil
- Raion: Kremenets
- First mentioned: 1545

Population (2001)
  - Total: 393
- Postal code: 47033
- Area code: +380 3546

Kolosova (Ukrainian: Колосова) is a village in Western Ukraine. Administratively it is part of Kremenets Raion of the Ternopil Oblast. It belongs to Kremenets urban hromada, one of the hromadas of Ukraine.

== History ==
The first written mention is from 1545.
