= Savchytsi =

Rural locality in Ternopil Oblast, Ukraine

Savchytsi Савчиці
- Village
- Interactive map of Savchytsi
- Location in Ternopil Oblast
- Coordinates: 50°4′47″N 25°34′30″E
- Country: Ukraine
- Oblast: Ternopil Oblast
- Raion: Kremenets Raion
- Hromada: Kremenets urban hromada
- Time zone: UTC+2 (EET)
  - Summer (DST): UTC+3 (EEST)
- Postal code: 47023

Savchytsi (Ukrainian: Савчиці) is a village in the Kremenets urban hromada of the Kremenets Raion of Ternopil Oblast in Ukraine. After the liquidation of the Kremenets Raion (1940–2020) on 19 July 2020, the village became part of the Kremenets Raion.

== Bibliography ==
- (in Ukrainian) Грищук М., Уніят В., Савчинці // Ternopil Encyclopedic Dictionary: in 4 v. / editorial board: H. Yavorskyi and other, Ternopil: "Zbruch", 2008, V. 3: П—Я, S. 218. — ISBN 978-966-528-279-2.
- "Sawczyce". Geographical Dictionary of the Kingdom of Poland (in Polish). p. 574.
