= Horynka =

Rural locality in Ternopil Oblast, Ukraine

Horynka Горинка
- Location in Ternopil Oblast
- Coordinates: 49°59′27″N 25°46′03″E
- Country: Ukraine
- Oblast: Ternopil Oblast
- Raion: Kremenets Raion
- Hromada: Kremenets urban hromada
- Time zone: UTC+2 (EET)
  - Summer (DST): UTC+3 (EEST)
- Postal code: 47042

Horynka (Ukrainian: Горинка) is a village in the Kremenets urban hromada of the Kremenets Raion of Ternopil Oblast in Ukraine.

== History ==
The first written mention of the village was in 1445.

== Religion ==
- Saint Michael church (1877, wooden),
- Saint Job of Pochayiv church (1997).

== Notable residents ==
- Mykola Lyzohub (1892–1918), Participant in the Battle of Kruty, captured and shot by the Bolsheviks

== Sources ==
- "Horynka". Geographical Dictionary of the Kingdom of Poland (in Polish). p. 586.
