= Rudka, Ternopil Oblast =

Rural locality in Ternopil Oblast, Ukraine

Rudka Рудка
- Village
- Interactive map of Rudka
- Location in Ternopil Oblast
- Coordinates: 50°2′30″N 25°39′16″E
- Country: Ukraine
- Oblast: Ternopil Oblast
- Raion: Kremenets Raion
- Hromada: Kremenets urban hromada

Population (2007)
  - Total: 618
- Time zone: UTC+2 (EET)
  - Summer (DST): UTC+3 (EEST)
- Postal code: 47033

Rudka (Ukrainian: Рудка) is a village in the Kremenets urban hromada of the Kremenets Raion of Ternopil Oblast in Ukraine. After the liquidation of the Kremenets Raion (1940–2020) on 19 July 2020, the village became part of the Kremenets Raion.

== Bibliography ==
- (in Ukrainian) Бігус М., Гуцал П., Рудка // Ternopil Encyclopedic Dictionary: in 4 v. / editorial board: H. Yavorskyi and other, Ternopil: "Zbruch", 2008, V. 3: П—Я, S. 204–205. — ISBN 978-966-528-279-2.
