= Roman Kozak (Ukrainian politician) =

Ukrainian politician (born 1957)

Roman Mykolayovych Kozak (Ukrainian: Роман Миколайович Козак, born 16 June 1957) was a candidate in the 2004 Ukrainian presidential election, nominated by the political party "Organization of Ukrainian Nationalists in Ukraine", which he has chaired since 2001. He is a co-author of the book "Scientific Notes of Metropolitan Peter Mogila", and a chair of the Peter Mogila Scientific Association. Platforms of his election program included a stiff defense of national interests, and 100 euro monthly support of the families with children.

== Early life ==
Kozak was born on 16 June 1957 in Bolotnya, which was then part of the Ukrainian SSR in the Soviet Union. In 1976, he graduated from Kremenets Forestry College. He then worked as an accountant for the Peremyshlyany forestry association, and served his mandatory conscription in the Soviet Armed Forces with Unit 01614, which was based in Khmelnytsky. Afterwards, he studied at the Lviv Forestry Institute, graduating in 1984 with the qualification of engineer. He then worked a variety of jobs until 1988, including heading the commmunal services for Frankivskyi District. In 1988, he became the founder and director of the State Botanical Garden of the Lviv Forestry Institute, which he served as until 1992 when he began working at a variety of enterprises as a founder and senior worker like "Caravella", small enterprise "Fito", "Impulse", and "Surma". He also, in 1988, became an iniator for the revival of the Prosvita movement to revive Ukrainian culture and language, and was elected deputy chairman of the movement in Kyiv in 1992.

== Political career ==
In 1994, he joined the "Organization of Ukrainian Nationalists in Ukraine", and by 1998 had become its chairman for its branch in Lviv. In 2001, he was promoted to chairman of the party.

On 12 September 2004, he was asked to step down from the chairmanship of the OUN, and the party council formally voted to remove him from leadership on 22 September. This stemmed from what acting party head Vitalii Tsapovych stated was because Kozak was a "media-killer" during his 2004 campaign after he frequently attacked other opponents, which he said caused harm to the OUN's reputation. Later, in 2005, the OUN filed a lawsuit against Kozak for 1 million hryvnias in compensation, alleging that he used OUN party emblems in his campaign videos without approval and the content of his speeches were not approved by the party.

== Personal life ==
He is married to Kozak O.M., a researcher at the Danylo Halytsky Lviv National Medical University. Together they have four children: three daughters called Olga, Natalia, and Elena and they have one son named Volodymyr.
