= Bohdanivka, Kremenets Raion, Ternopil Oblast =

Rural locality in Ternopil Oblast, Ukraine

Bohdanivka Богданівка
- Village
- Interactive map of Bohdanivka
- Location in Ternopil Oblast
- Coordinates: 50°2′24″N 25°36′13″E
- Country: Ukraine
- Oblast: Ternopil Oblast
- Raion: Kremenets Raion
- Hromada: Kremenets urban hromada
- Time zone: UTC+2 (EET)
  - Summer (DST): UTC+3 (EEST)
- Postal code: 47023

Bohdanivka (Ukrainian: Богданівка) is a village in the Kremenets urban hromada of the Kremenets Raion of Ternopil Oblast in Ukraine. After the liquidation of the Kremenets Raion (1940–2020) on 19 July 2020, the village became part of the Kremenets Raion.

== Bibliography ==
- (in Ukrainian) Грищук М., Хаварівський Б., Богданівка // Ternopil Encyclopedic Dictionary: in 4 v. / editorial board: H. Yavorskyi and other, Ternopil: "Zbruch", 2004, V. 1: А—Й, S. 149. — ISBN 966-528-197-6.
- "Bohdanówka 5.) wś nad Ikwą, pow. krzemieniecki". Geographical Dictionary of the Kingdom of Poland (in Polish). p. 183.
