= Ikva (village) =

Rural locality in Ternopil Oblast, Ukraine

Ikva Іква
- Village
- Interactive map of Ikva
- Location in Ternopil Oblast
- Coordinates: 50°07′32″N 25°39′16″E
- Country: Ukraine
- Oblast: Ternopil Oblast
- Raion: Kremenets Raion
- Hromada: Kremenets urban hromada

Population (2003)
  - Total: 572
- Time zone: UTC+2 (EET)
  - Summer (DST): UTC+3 (EEST)
- Postal code: 47073

Ikva (Ukrainian: Іква) is a village in the Kremenets urban hromada of the Kremenets Raion of Ternopil Oblast in Ukraine. After the liquidation of the Kremenets Raion (1940–2020) on 19 July 2020, the village became part of the Kremenets Raion.
