= Dukhiv =

Rural locality in Ternopil Oblast, Ukraine

Dukhiv Духів
- Village
- Interactive map of Dukhiv
- Location in Ternopil Oblast
- Coordinates: 50°00′32″N 25°42′04″E
- Country: Ukraine
- Oblast: Ternopil Oblast
- Raion: Kremenets Raion
- Hromada: Kremenets urban hromada
- Time zone: UTC+2 (EET)
  - Summer (DST): UTC+3 (EEST)
- Postal code: 47042

Dukhiv (Ukrainian: Духів) is a village in the Kremenets urban hromada of the Kremenets Raion of Ternopil Oblast in Ukraine. After the liquidation of the Kremenets Raion (1940–2020) on 19 July 2020, the village became part of the Kremenets Raion.
