= Pidlisne, Kremenets Raion, Ternopil Oblast =

Rural locality in Ternopil Oblast, Ukraine

Pidlisne Підлісне
- Village
- Interactive map of Pidlisne
- Location in Ternopil Oblast
- Coordinates: 50°3′30″N 25°48′5″E
- Country: Ukraine
- Oblast: Ternopil Oblast
- Raion: Kremenets Raion
- Hromada: Kremenets urban hromada
- Time zone: UTC+2 (EET)
  - Summer (DST): UTC+3 (EEST)
- Postal code: 47040

Pidlisne (Ukrainian: Підлісне) is a village in the Kremenets urban hromada of the Kremenets Raion of Ternopil Oblast in Ukraine. After the liquidation of the Kremenets Raion (1940–2020) on 19 July 2020, the village became part of the Kremenets Raion.
