= Pidhaitsi, Kremenets Raion, Ternopil Oblast =

Rural locality in Ternopil Oblast, Ukraine

Pidhaitsi Підгайці
- Village
- Interactive map of Pidhaitsi
- Location in Ternopil Oblast
- Coordinates: 49°58′30″N 25°53′11″E
- Country: Ukraine
- Oblast: Ternopil Oblast
- Raion: Kremenets Raion
- Hromada: Kremenets urban hromada
- Time zone: UTC+2 (EET)
  - Summer (DST): UTC+3 (EEST)
- Postal code: 47104

Pidhaitsi (Ukrainian: Підгайці) is a village in the Kremenets urban hromada of the Kremenets Raion of Ternopil Oblast in Ukraine. After the liquidation of the Kremenets Raion (1940–2020) on 19 July 2020, the village became part of the Kremenets Raion.

== Bibliography ==
- (in Ukrainian) М. Бесараба, П. Гуцал., Підгайці // Ternopil Encyclopedic Dictionary: in 4 v. / editorial board: H. Yavorskyi and other, Ternopil: "Zbruch", 2008, V. 3: П—Я, S. 79-80. — ISBN 978-966-528-279-2.
- "Podhajce (3), wś nad rz. Horynką, pow. krzemieniecki". Geographical Dictionary of the Kingdom of Poland (in Polish). 8. Warszawa: Kasa im. Józefa Mianowskiego. 1887. p. 384.
