= Andruha =

Rural locality in Ternopil Oblast, Ukraine

Andruha Андруга
- Village
- Interactive map of Andruha
- Location in Ternopil Oblast
- Coordinates: 50°10′09″N 25°45′09″E
- Country: Ukraine
- Oblast: Ternopil Oblast
- Raion: Kremenets Raion
- Hromada: Kremenets urban hromada
- Time zone: UTC+2 (EET)
  - Summer (DST): UTC+3 (EEST)
- Postal code: 47013

Andruha (Ukrainian: Андруга) is a village in the Kremenets urban hromada of the Kremenets Raion of Ternopil Oblast in Ukraine. After the liquidation of the Kremenets Raion (1940–2020) on 19 July 2020, the village became part of the Kremenets Raion.

== Bibliography ==
- (in Ukrainian) Мельничук М., Щирба В., Андруга // Ternopil Encyclopedic Dictionary: in 4 v. / editorial board: H. Yavorskyi and other, Ternopil: "Zbruch", 2004, V. 1: А—Й, S. 40. — ISBN 966-528-197-6.
- "Andruha(2)". Geographical Dictionary of the Kingdom of Poland (in Polish). p. 26.
