= Kimnata (village) =

Rural locality in Ternopil Oblast, Ukraine

Kimnata Кімната
- Village
- Interactive map of Kimnata
- Location in Ternopil Oblast
- Coordinates: 50°05′14″N 25°31′55″E
- Country: Ukraine
- Oblast: Ternopil Oblast
- Raion: Kremenets Raion
- Hromada: Kremenets urban hromada
- Time zone: UTC+2 (EET)
  - Summer (DST): UTC+3 (EEST)
- Postal code: 47021

Kimnata (Ukrainian: Кімната) is a village in the Kremenets urban hromada of the Kremenets Raion of Ternopil Oblast in Ukraine. After the liquidation of the Kremenets Raion (1940–2020) on 19 July 2020, the village became part of the Kremenets Raion.

== Bibliography ==
- (in Ukrainian) Ю. Болюх, Б. Хаварівський., Кімната // Ternopil Encyclopedic Dictionary: in 4 v. / editorial board: H. Yavorskyi and other, Ternopil: "Zbruch", 2005, V. 2: К—О, S. 76. — ISBN 966-528-199-2.
