= Ivankivtsi, Kremenets urban hromada, Kremenets Raion, Ternopil Oblast =

Rural locality in Ternopil Oblast, Ukraine

Ivankivtsi Іванківці
- Village
- Interactive map of Ivankivtsi
- Location in Ternopil Oblast
- Coordinates: 49°58′55″N 25°50′45″E
- Country: Ukraine
- Oblast: Ternopil Oblast
- Raion: Kremenets Raion
- Hromada: Kremenets urban hromada
- Time zone: UTC+2 (EET)
  - Summer (DST): UTC+3 (EEST)
- Postal code: 47041

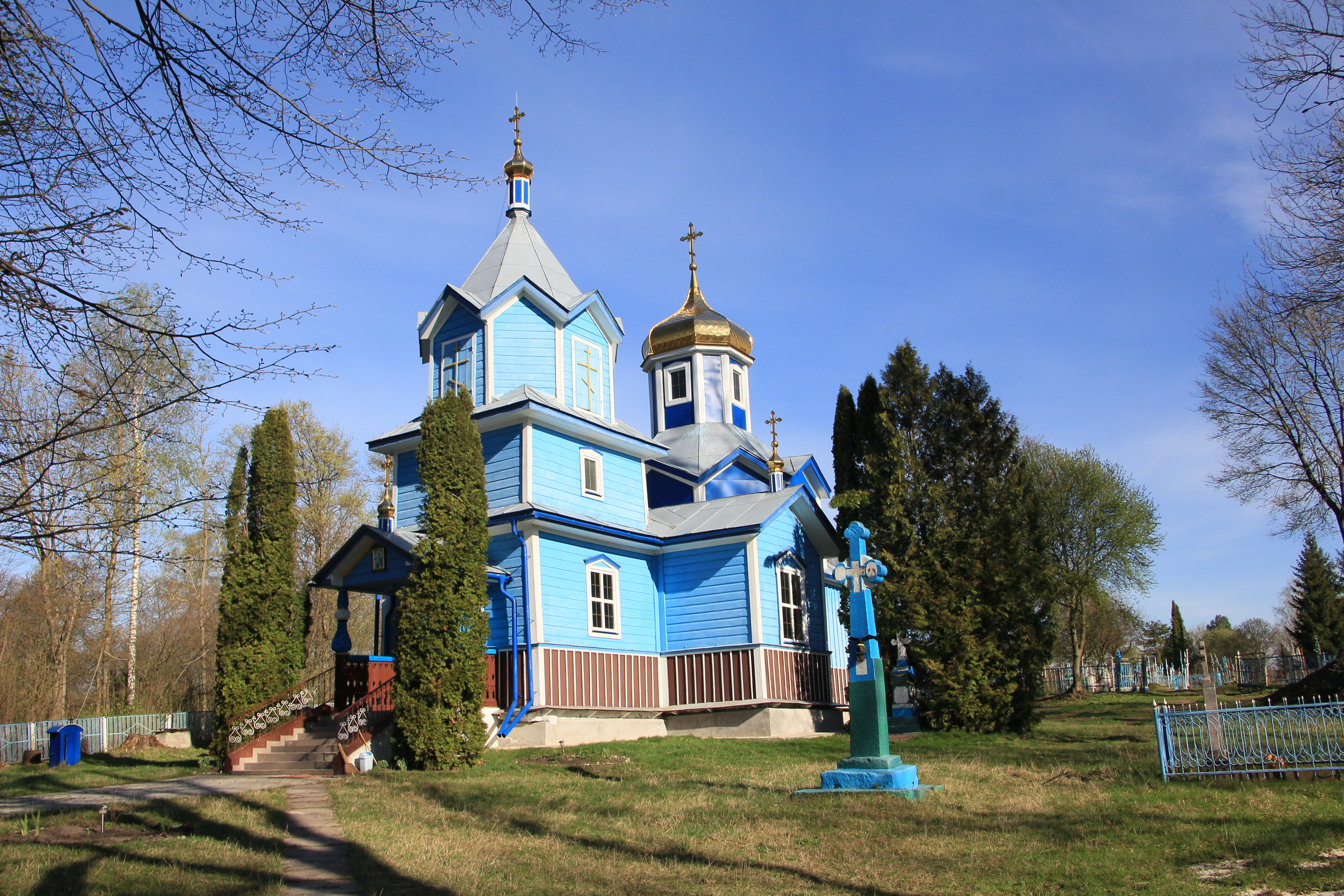

Ivankivtsi (Ukrainian: Іванківці) is a village in the Kremenets urban hromada of the Kremenets Raion of Ternopil Oblast in Ukraine. After the liquidation of the Kremenets Raion (1940–2020) on 19 July 2020, the village became part of the Kremenets Raion.

== Bibliography ==
- "Jankowce (4), n. Horynką, powiat krzemieniecki". Geographical Dictionary of the Kingdom of Poland (in Polish). p. 634.
