= Kushlyn =

Rural locality in Ternopil Oblast, Ukraine

Kushlyn Кушлин
- Village
- Interactive map of Kushlyn
- Location in Ternopil Oblast
- Coordinates: 49°58′51″N 25°49′21″E
- Country: Ukraine
- Oblast: Ternopil Oblast
- Raion: Kremenets Raion
- Hromada: Kremenets urban hromada
- Time zone: UTC+2 (EET)
  - Summer (DST): UTC+3 (EEST)
- Postal code: 47075

Kushlyn (Ukrainian: Кушлин) is a village in the Kremenets urban hromada of the Kremenets Raion of Ternopil Oblast in Ukraine. After the liquidation of the Kremenets Raion (1940–2020) on 19 July 2020, the village became part of the Kremenets Raion.

== Bibliography ==
- (in Ukrainian) Хаварівський Б., Кушлин // Ternopil Encyclopedic Dictionary: in 4 v. / editorial board: H. Yavorskyi and other, Ternopil: "Zbruch", 2005, V. 2: К—О, S. 304. — ISBN 966-528-199-2.
- (in Ukrainian) Івахів Г., Уніят В., Кушлин // Ternopil Oblast. History of cities and villages: in 3 v. / Ternopil: "Terno-graph", 2014, V. 2: Г—Л, S. 559—560. — ISBN 978-966-457-228-3.
- "Kuszlin". Geographical Dictionary of the Kingdom of Poland (in Polish). 4. Warszawa: Kasa im. Józefa Mianowskiego. 1883. p. 953.
- "Kuszlin". Geographical Dictionary of the Kingdom of Poland (in Polish). p. 203.
