= Pidlistsi, Ternopil Oblast =

Rural locality in Ternopil Oblast, Ukraine

Pidlistsi Підлісці
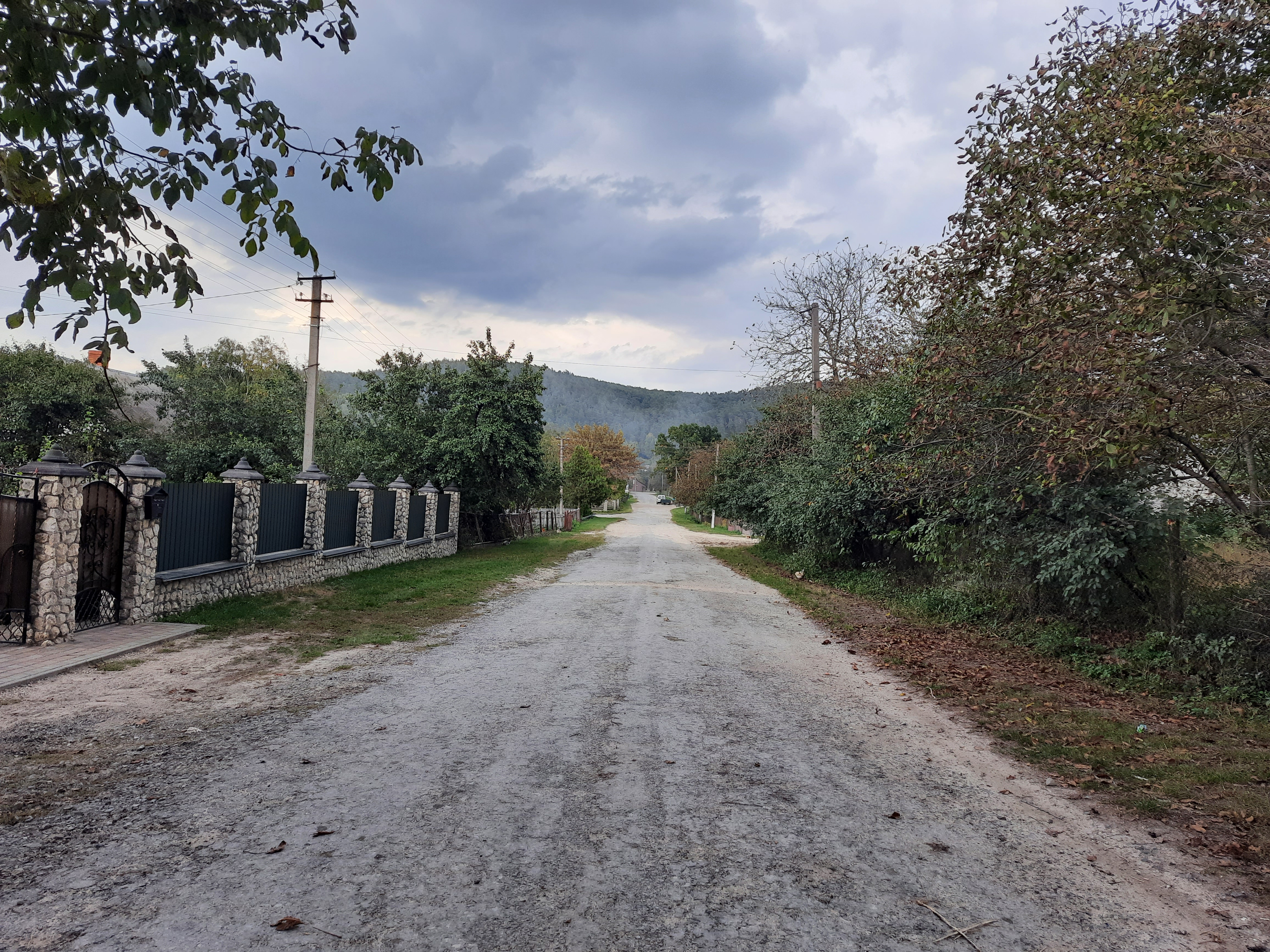
- Village street

- Location in Ternopil Oblast
- Coordinates: 50°06′13″N 25°41′03″E
- Country: Ukraine
- Oblast: Ternopil Oblast
- Raion: Kremenets Raion
- Hromada: Kremenets urban hromada
- Time zone: UTC+2 (EET)
  - Summer (DST): UTC+3 (EEST)
- Postal code: 47009

Pidlistsi (Ukrainian: Підлісці) is a village in the Kremenets urban hromada of the Kremenets Raion of Ternopil Oblast in Ukraine.

== History ==
The first written mention of the village was in 1438.

On 19 July 2020, as a result of the administrative-territorial reform and liquidation of the Kremenets Raion, the village became part of the Kremenets Raion.

== Religion ==
The village has the Church of the Transfiguration (1913, built on the ruins of the old church) and the Bohdanova chapel.

== Sources ==
- (in Ukrainian) Галевич О., Підлісці // Ternopil Encyclopedic Dictionary: in 4 v. / editorial board: H. Yavorskyi and other, Ternopil: "Zbruch", 2008, V. 3: П—Я, S. 84. — ISBN 978-966-528-279-2.
- "Podleśce, pow. krzemieniecki". Geographical Dictionary of the Kingdom of Poland (in Polish). 8. Warszawa: Kasa im. Józefa Mianowskiego. 1887. p. 419.
- "Podleśce". Geographical Dictionary of the Kingdom of Poland (in Polish). p. 469.
