= Zholoby, Ternopil Oblast =

Rural locality in Ternopil Oblast, Ukraine

Zholoby Жолоби
- Village
- Interactive map of Zholoby
- Location in Ternopil Oblast
- Coordinates: 50°4′33″N 25°41′21″E
- Country: Ukraine
- Oblast: Ternopil Oblast
- Raion: Kremenets Raion
- Hromada: Kremenets urban hromada
- Time zone: UTC+2 (EET)
  - Summer (DST): UTC+3 (EEST)
- Postal code: 47030

Zholoby (Ukrainian: Жолоби) is a village in the Kremenets urban hromada of the Kremenets Raion of Ternopil Oblast in Ukraine. After the liquidation of the Kremenets Raion (1940–2020) on 19 July 2020, the village became part of the Kremenets Raion.

== Bibliography ==
- (in Ukrainian) Голобородько Р., Ониськів М., Жолоби // Ternopil Encyclopedic Dictionary: in 4 v. / editorial board: H. Yavorskyi and other, Ternopil: "Zbruch", 2004, V. 1: А—Й, S. 580. — ISBN 966-528-197-6.
- "Żołoby(3)". Geographical Dictionary of the Kingdom of Poland (in Polish). 14. Warszawa: Kasa im. Józefa Mianowskiego. 1895. p. 825.
