= Ploske, Kremenets Raion, Ternopil Oblast =

Rural locality in Ternopil Oblast, Ukraine

Ploske Плоске
- Village
- Interactive map of Ploske
- Location in Ternopil Oblast
- Coordinates: 50°2′40″N 25°46′59″E
- Country: Ukraine
- Oblast: Ternopil Oblast
- Raion: Kremenets Raion
- Hromada: Kremenets urban hromada
- Time zone: UTC+2 (EET)
  - Summer (DST): UTC+3 (EEST)
- Postal code: 47040

Ploske (Ukrainian: Плоске) is a village in the Kremenets urban hromada of the Kremenets Raion of Ternopil Oblast in Ukraine. After the liquidation of the Kremenets Raion (1940–2020) on 19 July 2020, the village became part of the Kremenets Raion.

== Bibliography ==
- (in Ukrainian) Романюк М., Уніят В., Плоске // Ternopil Encyclopedic Dictionary: in 4 v. / editorial board: H. Yavorskyi and other, Ternopil: "Zbruch", 2008, V. 3: П—Я, S. 97. — ISBN 978-966-528-279-2.
- (in Ukrainian) Івахів Г., Томчук А., Плоске // Ternopil Oblast. History of cities and villages: in 3 v. / Ternopil: "Terno-graph", 2014, V. 1: А—В, S. 577–578. — ISBN 978-966-457-228-3.
