= Staryi Kokoriv =

Rural locality in Ternopil Oblast, Ukraine

Staryi Kokoriv Старий Кокорів
- Village
- Interactive map of Staryi Kokoriv
- Location in Ternopil Oblast
- Coordinates: 50°0′32″N 25°37′14″E
- Country: Ukraine
- Oblast: Ternopil Oblast
- Raion: Kremenets Raion
- Hromada: Kremenets urban hromada

Population (2007)
  - Total: 348
- Time zone: UTC+2 (EET)
  - Summer (DST): UTC+3 (EEST)
- Postal code: 47034

Staryi Kokoriv (Ukrainian: Старий Кокорів) is a village in the Kremenets urban hromada of the Kremenets Raion of Ternopil Oblast in Ukraine. After the liquidation of the Kremenets Raion (1940–2020) on 19 July 2020, the village became part of the Kremenets Raion.

== Bibliography ==
- (in Ukrainian) В. Уніят, Старий Кокорів // Ternopil Encyclopedic Dictionary: in 4 v. / editorial board: H. Yavorskyi and other, Ternopil: "Zbruch", 2008, V. 3: П—Я, S. 332. — ISBN 978-966-528-279-2.
