= Mali Berezhtsi =

Rural locality in Ternopil Oblast, Ukraine

Mali Berezhtsi Малі Бережці
- Village
- Interactive map of Mali Berezhtsi
- Location in Ternopil Oblast
- Coordinates: 50°06′38″N 25°37′47″E
- Country: Ukraine
- Oblast: Ternopil Oblast
- Raion: Kremenets Raion
- Hromada: Kremenets urban hromada
- Time zone: UTC+2 (EET)
  - Summer (DST): UTC+3 (EEST)
- Postal code: 47020

Mali Berezhtsi (Ukrainian: Малі Бережці) is a village in the Kremenets urban hromada of the Kremenets Raion of Ternopil Oblast in Ukraine. After the liquidation of the Kremenets Raion (1940–2020) on 19 July 2020, the village became part of the Kremenets Raion.

== Bibliography ==
- (in Ukrainian) Чернихівський Г., Малі Бережці // Ternopil Encyclopedic Dictionary: in 4 v. / editorial board: H. Yavorskyi and other, Ternopil: "Zbruch", 2005, V. 2: К—О, S. 446. — ISBN 966-528-199-2.
- "Bereźce (3), pow. krzemieniecki". Geographical Dictionary of the Kingdom of Poland (in Polish). p. 105.
