= Ukrainian National Forestry University =

Public university in Lviv, Ukraine

Coordinates: 49.8250°N 24.0033°E

- Національний лісотехнічний університет України
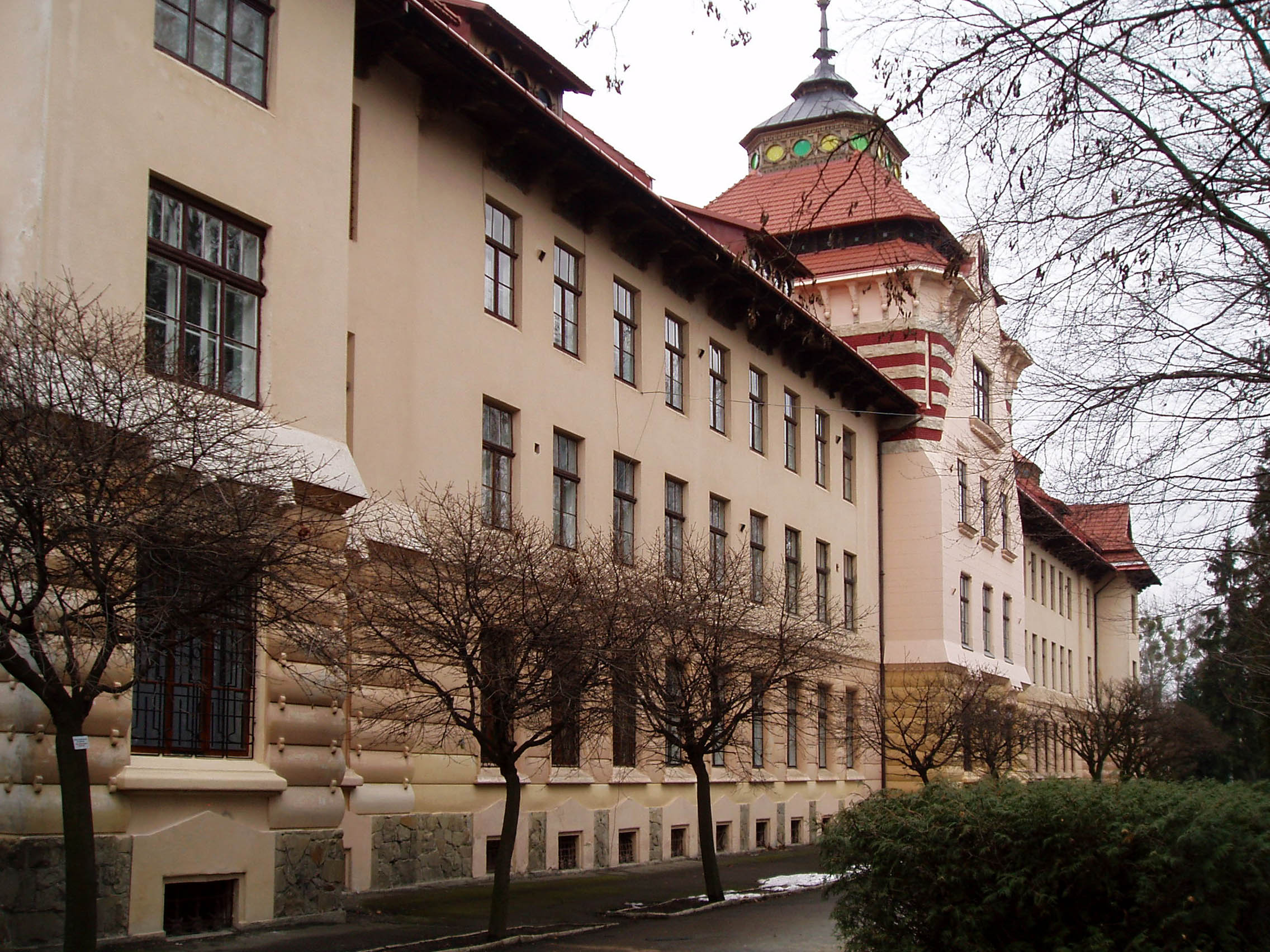
- Latin: Silvae Universitas
- Motto: Ad naturam vivere discimus
- Type: Public
- Established: 1874
- Affiliations: Ministry of Education and Science of Ukraine
- Rector: Tunytsia Yurii Yuriovych
- Students: 7000
- Location: Lviv, Ukraine
- Campus: Urban
- Website: www.nltu.edu.ua

University rankings

Regional – Overall
- QS Emerging Europe and Central Asia: 251-300 (2022)

The National Forestry and Wood-Technology University of Ukraine (Ukrainian: Національний лісотехнічний університет України, romanized: Natsionalnyi lisotekhnichnyi universytet Ukrainy) is a Ukrainian university in Lviv.

== History ==
=== Austro-Hungarian period ===
Establishing of forestry education in western Ukraine had a long prehistory. In 1807, Galychian foresters appealed to the Government with a request to open a secondary forestry educational establishment. In 1812, the project of creation of a department and professional studios at Lviv University was submitted for consideration. In 1852, a Forestry Section began to operate at the Galychina Economic Society, and soon in 1874 the Galychina Forestry Society appeared. On 24 October 1874, the Regional School of Forestry began training of specialists in Lviv. In 1908, the Regional School of Forestry was given a status of a higher educational establishment.

=== Period of Poland's rule ===
Reorganization of educational establishments took place after the defeat of the Western-Ukrainian People Republic in Polish domination times. Higher Forestry School was joined with the Agrarian Academy and Agrarian-Forestry Faculty of Lviv Polytechnic University was established. In 1921–1926, Ukrainian underground University with Forestry (later on Forestry-Agrarian) Faculty within its structure operated in Lviv.

=== Period of German occupation ===
In 1941–1944 only professional forestry courses on the basis of Lviv Polytechnic University functioned.

=== Period of the Ukrainian SSR ===
On 15 January 1945, a resolution of the USSR Government concerning the foundation of the Lviv Forestry Institute was adopted. On 6 November 1954, the Forestry-Melioration Faculty of the Lviv Agrarian Institute was joined with the Forestry Faculty of the Forestry University. In 1988, the Lviv Forestry Institute was named after the prominent scientist and academician Petro S. Pohrebnyak .

=== Independent Ukraine ===
On 17 June 1993, the Forestry Institute was successfully accredited; it received a state license for educational activity at the fourth educational-qualifying level. By resolution of Ukraine's Cabinet of 13 August 1993, No. 646, the Ukrainian State Forestry University was founded on the basis of the Petro Pohrebnyak Lviv Forestry Institute. On 16 May 2005, the university was given "national" status.

== Campuses and buildings ==
The university is accommodated in nine academic buildings, one of them being an architectural monument. Residence halls are located on the university area. All the academic buildings and residence halls together make up the university campus. Library users are served in two lending and three reading halls. The library is located in a separate building and also two more departments are located in other university buildings. The Internet access is provided in every university building.

== Institutes and faculties ==
At present, the university comprises the Institute of Ecological Economics, six faculties: Faculty of Forestry, Faculty of Forest Engineering and Mechanics, Faculty of Woodworking Technology, Faculty of Economics, Faculty of Corresponding Studies and Post-Diploma Training, the Research Department, the Scientific Technical Library, the Small Forest Academy, Lviv Technological College, Transcarpathian Forestry College, the State Botanical Garden, the natural reserve "Rostochya", the Stradch Educational Forestry Enterprise, the Educational and Consulting Centre in Khust (Transcarpathian region), the Carpathian and Polissya Research Forest Ecology Laboratories, three educational and research ecological centres, a sport-and-recreation centre on the Black Sea coast and a number of other institutions.

== Honorary doctors ==
Helmut Kohl, Leonid Rudnytsky, Hans Essmann, Noel Lust, Davide Pettenella, Hansjurgen Doss, Ditrich Blumenwitz.

== Prominent graduates ==
- Mykola Petrovych Chaikovsky (1922–2011) – naturalist
- Ivan Hrunyansky – Minister of Forestry and Carpentry (1965–1986)
- Oleksandr Kapinos (1984–2014) – political activist
- Yaroslav Khoma (1974–) – professional footballer
- Roman Kozak (1957–) – presidential candidate in 2004
- Atena Pashko (1931–2012) – chemical engineer, poet, social activist
- Yuriy Ruf (1980–2022) – poet and reservist
- Mykola Shershun – Head of the State Forestry Committee (2010)
- Roman Shpek (1954–) – Minister of the Economy (1993–5); Vice-premier of Ukraine for Economic Issues (1995–6), Head of the Permanent Representative Office of Ukraine at the European Union (2002–7)
- Yuriy Tunytsya – NAS academician, Doctor of Economics, professor, member of the official delegation of Ukraine at the 63d session of the UN General Assembly (2008), member of the official delegation of Ukraine at the UN Conference on sustainable development issues (2012), originator of the World Environmental Constitution

== Awards and reputation ==
According to UNESCO TOP-2000 of Ukraine in 2012 the university was ranked 32

== See also ==
List of universities in Ukraine
