= Kudlaivka, Ternopil Oblast =

Rural locality in Ternopil Oblast, Ukraine

Kudlaivka Кудлаївка
- Village
- Interactive map of Kudlaivka
- Location in Ternopil Oblast
- Coordinates: 49°58′59″N 25°53′51″E
- Country: Ukraine
- Oblast: Ternopil Oblast
- Raion: Kremenets Raion
- Hromada: Kremenets urban hromada
- Time zone: UTC+2 (EET)
  - Summer (DST): UTC+3 (EEST)
- Postal code: 47104

Kudlaivka (Ukrainian: Кудлаївка) is a village in the Kremenets urban hromada of the Kremenets Raion of Ternopil Oblast in Ukraine. After the liquidation of the Kremenets Raion (1940–2020) on 19 July 2020, the village became part of the Kremenets Raion.

== Bibliography ==
- "Kudłajówka, gm. Borki". Geographical Dictionary of the Kingdom of Poland (in Polish). p. 189.
