= Popivtsi, Kremenets Raion, Ternopil Oblast =

Rural locality in Ternopil Oblast, Ukraine

Popivtsi Попівці
- Village
- Interactive map of Popivtsi
- Location in Ternopil Oblast
- Coordinates: 50°0′8″N 25°38′35″E
- Country: Ukraine
- Oblast: Ternopil Oblast
- Raion: Kremenets Raion
- Hromada: Kremenets urban hromada

Population (2007)
  - Total: 358
- Time zone: UTC+2 (EET)
  - Summer (DST): UTC+3 (EEST)
- Postal code: 47034

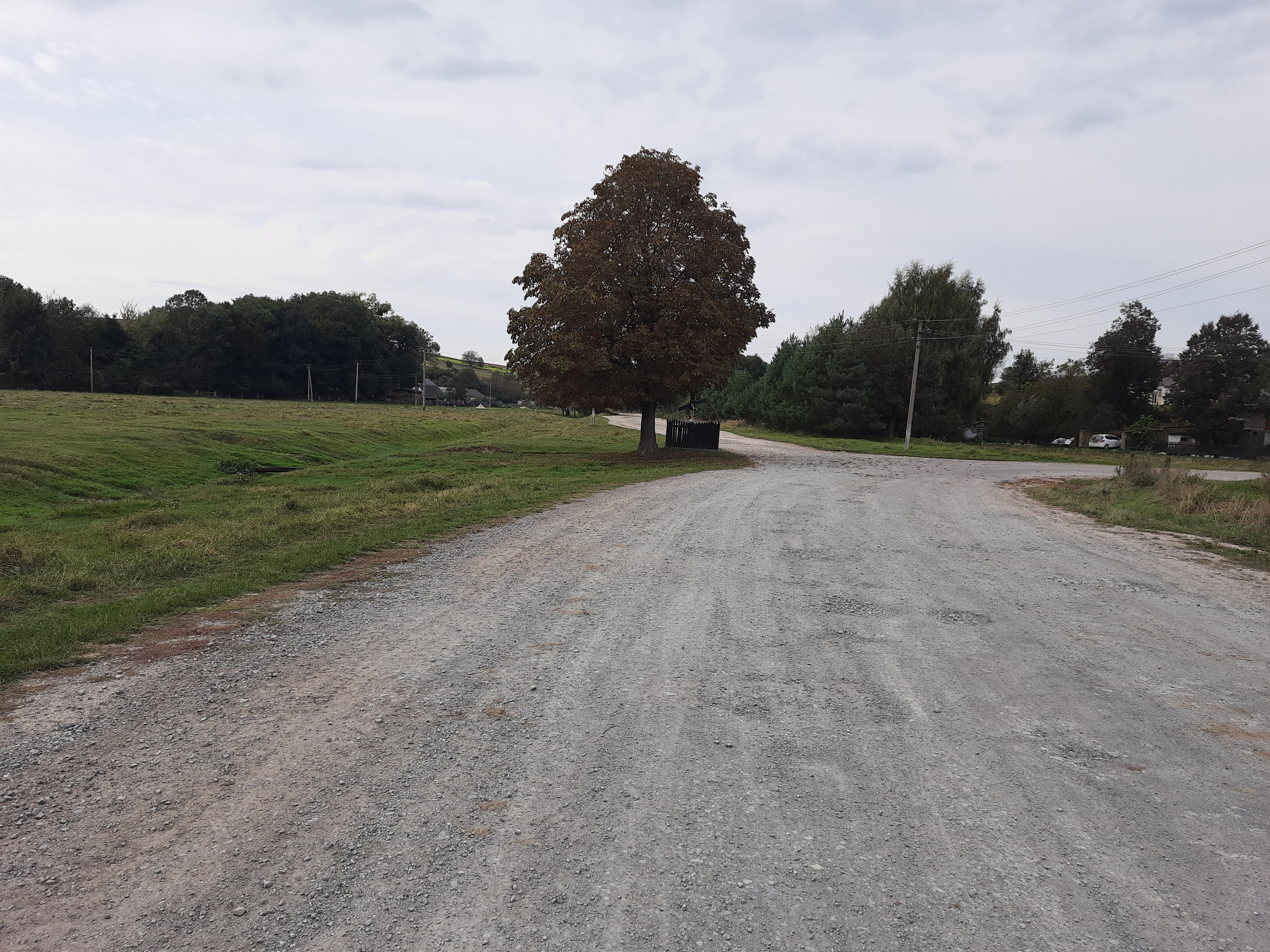
Entrance to the village of Popivtsi Kremenets District, Ternopil Oblast

Popivtsi (Ukrainian: Попівці) is a village in the Kremenets urban hromada of the Kremenets Raion of Ternopil Oblast in Ukraine. After the liquidation of the Kremenets Raion (1940–2020) on 19 July 2020, the village became part of the Kremenets Raion.

== Bibliography ==
- "Popowce (3)". Geographical Dictionary of the Kingdom of Poland (in Polish). p. 495.
