= Hai, Kremenets Raion, Ternopil Oblast =

Rural locality in Ternopil Oblast, Ukraine

Hai Гаї
- Village
- Interactive map of Hai
- Location in Ternopil Oblast
- Coordinates: 50°08′40″N 25°32′20″E
- Country: Ukraine
- Oblast: Ternopil Oblast
- Raion: Kremenets Raion
- Hromada: Kremenets urban hromada
- Time zone: UTC+2 (EET)
  - Summer (DST): UTC+3 (EEST)
- Postal code: 47011

Hai (Ukrainian: Гаї) is a village in the Kremenets urban hromada of the Kremenets Raion of Ternopil Oblast in Ukraine. After the liquidation of the Kremenets Raion (1940–2020) on 19 July 2020, the village became part of the Kremenets Raion.

== Bibliography ==
- "Gaje". Geographical Dictionary of the Kingdom of Poland (in Polish). p. 483.
