= Rybcha =

Rural locality in Ternopil Oblast, Ukraine

Rybcha Рибча
- Village
- Interactive map of Rybcha
- Location in Ternopil Oblast
- Coordinates: 50°1′7″N 25°51′18″E
- Country: Ukraine
- Oblast: Ternopil Oblast
- Raion: Kremenets Raion
- Hromada: Kremenets urban hromada
- Time zone: UTC+2 (EET)
  - Summer (DST): UTC+3 (EEST)
- Postal code: 47041

Rybcha (Ukrainian: Рибча) is a village in the Kremenets urban hromada of the Kremenets Raion of Ternopil Oblast in Ukraine. After the liquidation of the Kremenets Raion (1940–2020) on 19 July 2020, the village became part of the Kremenets Raion.

== Bibliography ==
- (in Ukrainian) Гуцал П., Рибча // Ternopil Encyclopedic Dictionary: in 4 v. / editorial board: H. Yavorskyi and other, Ternopil: "Zbruch", 2008, V. 3: П—Я, S. 178. — ISBN 978-966-528-279-2.
