= Lishnia, Ternopil Oblast =

Rural locality in Ternopil Oblast, Ukraine

Lishnia Лішня
- Location in Ternopil Oblast
- Coordinates: 50°10′24″N 25°49′05″E
- Country: Ukraine
- Oblast: Ternopil Oblast
- Raion: Kremenets Raion
- Hromada: Kremenets urban hromada
- Time zone: UTC+2 (EET)
  - Summer (DST): UTC+3 (EEST)
- Postal code: 47013

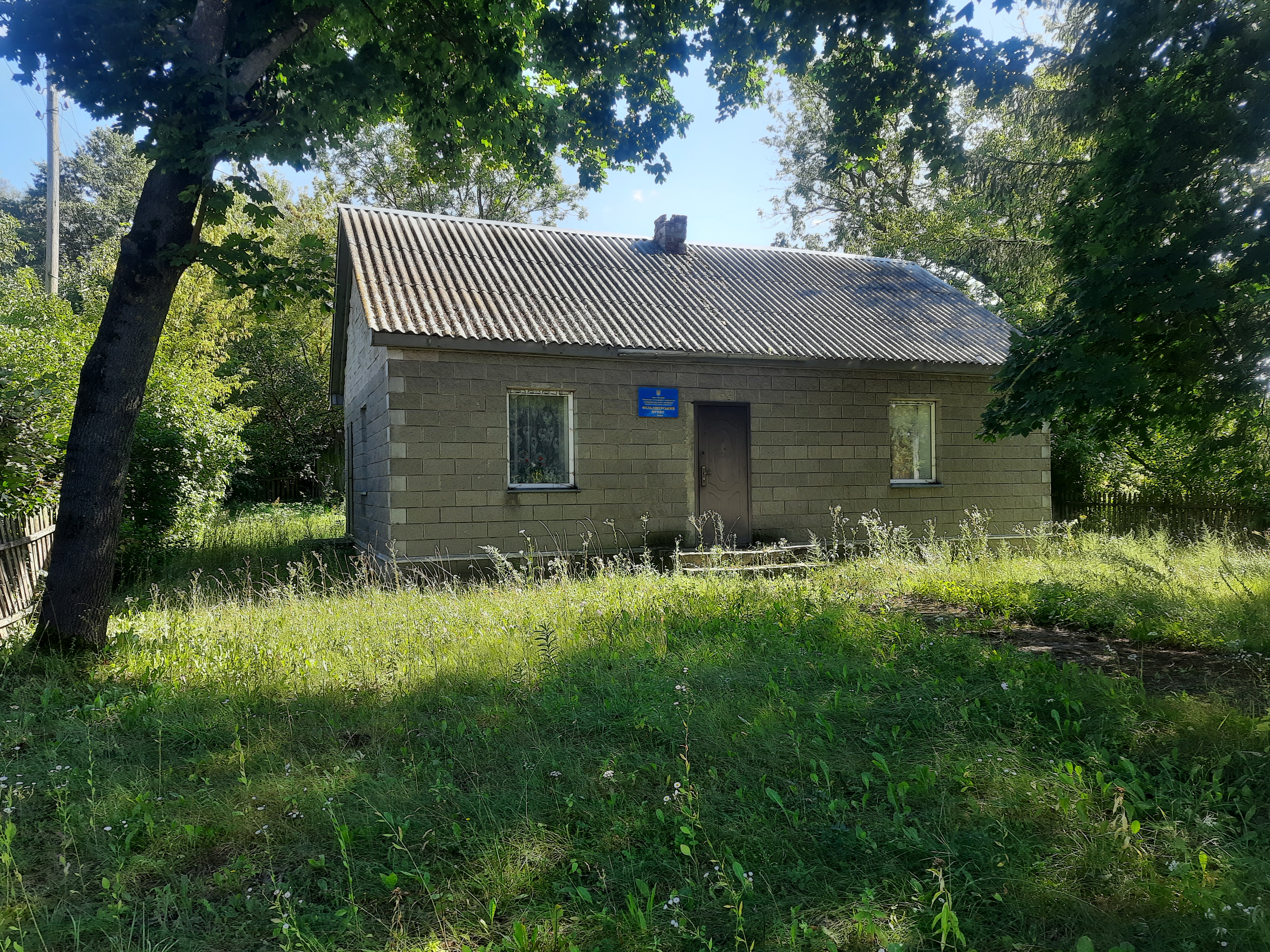
The paramedical and obstetric station in Lishnia

Lishnia (Ukrainian: Лішня) is a village in the Kremenets urban hromada of the Kremenets Raion of Ternopil Oblast in Ukraine.

== History ==
The first written mention of the village was in 1545.

== Religion ==
- Saint Demetrius church (1980s),
- All-Ukrainian church-pantheon in memory of the fallen heroes in the Russian-Ukrainian war (2023, rebuilt from a chapel, OCU).

== Sources ==
- (in Ukrainian) Хаварівський Б., Лішня // Ternopil Encyclopedic Dictionary: in 4 v. / editorial board: H. Yavorskyi and other, Ternopil: "Zbruch", 2005, V. 2: К—О, S. 382. — ISBN 966-528-199-2.
- "Lisznia (pow.krzemieniecki)". Geographical Dictionary of the Kingdom of Poland (in Polish). p. 237.
