= Kremenets urban hromada =

Hromada in Ternopil Oblast, Ukraine

Kremenets urban hromada Кременецька міська громада
- Hromada
- Coat of arms

- Location within Ternopil Oblast Location within Ukraine
- Coordinates: 50°06′29″N 25°43′39″E
- Country: Ukraine
- Oblast (province): Ternopil Oblast
- Raion (district): Kremenets Raion

Area
  - Total: 522.9 km^{2} (201.9 sq mi)

Population (2023)
  - Total: 42,064
- City: 1
- Villages: 43

Kremenets urban territorial hromada (Ukrainian: Кременецька міська територіальна громада, romanized: Kremenetska miska terytorialna hromada) is a hromada located in Kremenets Raion, in the western Ternopil Oblast of Ukraine. Its administrative centre is the city of Kremenets.

The hromada has a size of 522.9 km^{2} (201.9 mi^{2}), and a population of 42,064 (As of 2023).

== Settlements ==
In addition to one city (Kremenets), the hromada includes 43 villages:

- Andruha
- Bilokrynytsia
- Bohdanivka
- Bonivka
- Chuhali
- Dibrova
- Dukhiv
- Dunaiv
- Dvirets
- Hai
- Horynka
- Hrada
- Ikva
- Ivankivtsi
- Katerynivka
- Khotivka
- Kimnata
- Kolosova
- Kryzhi
- Kudlaivka
- Kulykiv
- Kushlyn
- Lishnia
- Mali Berezhtsi
- Novyi Kokoriv
- Pidhaitsi
- Pidlisne
- Pidlistsi
- Ploske
- Popivtsi
- Rudka
- Rybcha
- Sapaniv
- Savchytsi
- Shpykolosy
- Staryi Kokoriv
- Velyki Berezhtsi
- Velyki Mlynivtsi
- Verbytsia
- Vesela
- Veselivka
- Zeblazy
- Zholoby
