= Shpykolosy =

Rural locality in Ternopil Oblast, Ukraine

Shpykolosy Шпиколоси
- Village
- Interactive map of Shpykolosy
- Location in Ternopil Oblast
- Coordinates: 50°2′20″N 25°44′11″E
- Country: Ukraine
- Oblast: Ternopil Oblast
- Raion: Kremenets Raion
- Hromada: Kremenets urban hromada
- Time zone: UTC+2 (EET)
  - Summer (DST): UTC+3 (EEST)
- Postal code: 47009

Shpykolosy (Ukrainian: Шпиколоси) is a village in the Kremenets urban hromada of the Kremenets Raion of Ternopil Oblast in Ukraine. After the liquidation of the Kremenets Raion (1940–2020) on 19 July 2020, the village became part of the Kremenets Raion.

== Bibliography ==
- (in Ukrainian) В. Уніят, Г. Чернихівський., Шпиколоси // Ternopil Encyclopedic Dictionary: in 4 v. / editorial board: H. Yavorskyi and other, Ternopil: "Zbruch", 2008, V. 3: П—Я, S. 648. — ISBN 978-966-528-279-2.
- "Szpikołosy 1.) pow.krzemieniecki, gm. Białokrynica". Geographical Dictionary of the Kingdom of Poland (in Polish). p. 645.
