= Bonivka =

Rural locality in Ternopil Oblast, Ukraine

Bonivka Бонівка
- Village
- Interactive map of Bonivka
- Location in Ternopil Oblast
- Coordinates: 50°4′59″N 25°45′52″E
- Country: Ukraine
- Oblast: Ternopil Oblast
- Raion: Kremenets Raion
- Hromada: Kremenets urban hromada
- Time zone: UTC+2 (EET)
  - Summer (DST): UTC+3 (EEST)
- Postal code: 47003

Bonivka (Ukrainian: Бонівка) is a village in the Kremenets urban hromada of the Kremenets Raion of Ternopil Oblast in Ukraine. After the liquidation of the Kremenets Raion (1940–2020) on 19 July 2020, the village became part of the Kremenets Raion.

== Bibliography ==
- (in Ukrainian) Сергєєва Н., Уніят В., Бонівка // Ternopil Encyclopedic Dictionary: in 4 v. / editorial board: H. Yavorskyi and other, Ternopil: "Zbruch", 2004, V. 1: А—Й, S. 167. — ISBN 966-528-197-6.
