= Chuhali =

Rural locality in Ternopil Oblast, Ukraine

Chuhali Чугалі
- Village
- Interactive map of Chuhali
- Location in Ternopil Oblast
- Coordinates: 50°6′12″N 25°48′18″E
- Country: Ukraine
- Oblast: Ternopil Oblast
- Raion: Kremenets Raion
- Hromada: Kremenets urban hromada
- Time zone: UTC+2 (EET)
  - Summer (DST): UTC+3 (EEST)
- Postal code: 47070

Chuhali (Ukrainian: Чугалі) is a village in the Kremenets urban hromada of the Kremenets Raion of Ternopil Oblast in Ukraine. After the liquidation of the Kremenets Raion (1940–2020) on 19 July 2020, the village became part of the Kremenets Raion.

== Bibliography ==
- (in Ukrainian) В. Уніят., Чугалі // Ternopil Encyclopedic Dictionary: in 4 v. / editorial board: H. Yavorskyi and other, Ternopil: "Zbruch", 2008, V. 3: П—Я, S. 616. — ISBN 978-966-528-279-2.
