= Yuriy Ruf =

Ukrainian poet, writer and public figure (1980–2022)

- Юрій Романович Дадак
- Born: 26 September 1980; Berezhany, Ternopil Oblast, Ukrainian SSR, USSR
- Died: 1 April 2022 (aged 41); Luhansk Oblast, Ukraine
- Education: Ukrainian National Forestry University
- Occupation: Academic
- Children: Two
- Writing career
- Years active: 2011–2022
- Notable works: "Багряна лірика" (2012) "Час революції" (2014) "На зламі епох" (2015)

Yuriy Ruf (Ukrainian: Юрій Руф), real name Yuriy Romanovych Dadak (Ukrainian: Юрій Романович Дадак; 26 September 1980 – 1 April 2022), was a Ukrainian poet, writer, scientist, public figure, and founder of a literary project "Dukh Natsiyi" ("Nation's spirit").

== Biography ==
Yuriy Ruf was born in 1980 in the Ternopil region of Ukraine. His publications include "Багряна лірика" (2012), "Час Революції" (2014), and "На зламі епох" (2015). His poetry was also included in Ukrainian modern nationalist poetry compilations "Голос крові" (2013), and "Відлуння свинцевих громовиць" (2015). Yuriy Ruf began writing poetry when he was 14 years old. He is known for his critical views toward traditional Ukrainian poetry where, according to him, Ukrainians are predominantly portrayed as poor and ill-fated. He believed such poetry lowers self-esteem and a sense of national pride. He, therefore, considered his poetry to be a type of poetic propaganda of patriotism. Fans describe his poetry as "front line lyrics", that is poetry of war and patriotism aimed at raising fighting spirit, delivering motivation, and a sense of national pride.

His most recent publication "На зламі епох" (2015) was dedicated to Ukrainian heroes of the current Russian-Ukrainian war, and contains verses honoring certain individuals, military units, Ukrainian soldiers, battles, and other wartime events.

He lived in Lviv, and was a father of two children. He was a reservist for the 24th mechanized brigade, and was killed in action during the 2022 Russian invasion of Ukraine in Luhansk Oblast.
