= Velyki Mlynivtsi =

Rural locality in Ternopil Oblast, Ukraine

Velyki Mlynivtsi Великі Млинівці
- Village
- Interactive map of Velyki Mlynivtsi
- Location in Ternopil Oblast
- Coordinates: 50°06′53″N 25°39′57″E
- Country: Ukraine
- Oblast: Ternopil Oblast
- Raion: Kremenets Raion
- Hromada: Kremenets urban hromada
- Time zone: UTC+2 (EET)
  - Summer (DST): UTC+3 (EEST)
- Postal code: 47017

Velyki Mlynivtsi (Ukrainian: Великі Млинівці) is a village in the Kremenets urban hromada of the Kremenets Raion of Ternopil Oblast in Ukraine. After the liquidation of the Kremenets Raion (1940–2020) on 19 July 2020, the village became part of the Kremenets Raion.

== Bibliography ==
- (in Ukrainian) В.Уніят., Великі Млинівці // Ternopil Encyclopedic Dictionary: in 4 v. / editorial board: H. Yavorskyi and other, Ternopil: "Zbruch", 2004, V. 1: А—Й, S. 242. — ISBN 966-528-197-6.
- (in Ukrainian) О.Галевич, В.Івхів., Великі Млинівці // Ternopil Oblast. History of cities and villages: in 3 v. / Ternopil: "Terno-graph", 2014, V. 1: А—В, S. 532–533. — ISBN 978-966-457-228-3.
- Василь Галевич. Село Великі Млинівці: історико-краєзнавчий нарис. — Кременець: ВАТ «Папірус», 2007. — 84 с.
- "Młynowce". Geographical Dictionary of the Kingdom of Poland (in Polish). 6. Warszawa: Kasa im. Józefa Mianowskiego. 1885. p. 548.
