= Zeblazy =

Rural locality in Ternopil Oblast, Ukraine

Zeblazy Зеблази
- Village
- Interactive map of Zeblazy
- Location in Ternopil Oblast
- Coordinates: 50°6′7″N 25°45′59″E
- Country: Ukraine
- Oblast: Ternopil Oblast
- Raion: Kremenets Raion
- Hromada: Kremenets urban hromada
- Time zone: UTC+2 (EET)
  - Summer (DST): UTC+3 (EEST)
- Postal code: 47001

Zeblazy (Ukrainian: Зеблази) is a village in the Kremenets urban hromada of the Kremenets Raion of Ternopil Oblast in Ukraine. After the liquidation of the Kremenets Raion (1940–2020) on 19 July 2020, the village became part of the Kremenets Raion.
