= Oleksandr Kapinos =

Ukrainian political activist (1984–2014)

Oleksandr Kapinos HOU OGS
- Олекса́ндр Капіно́с
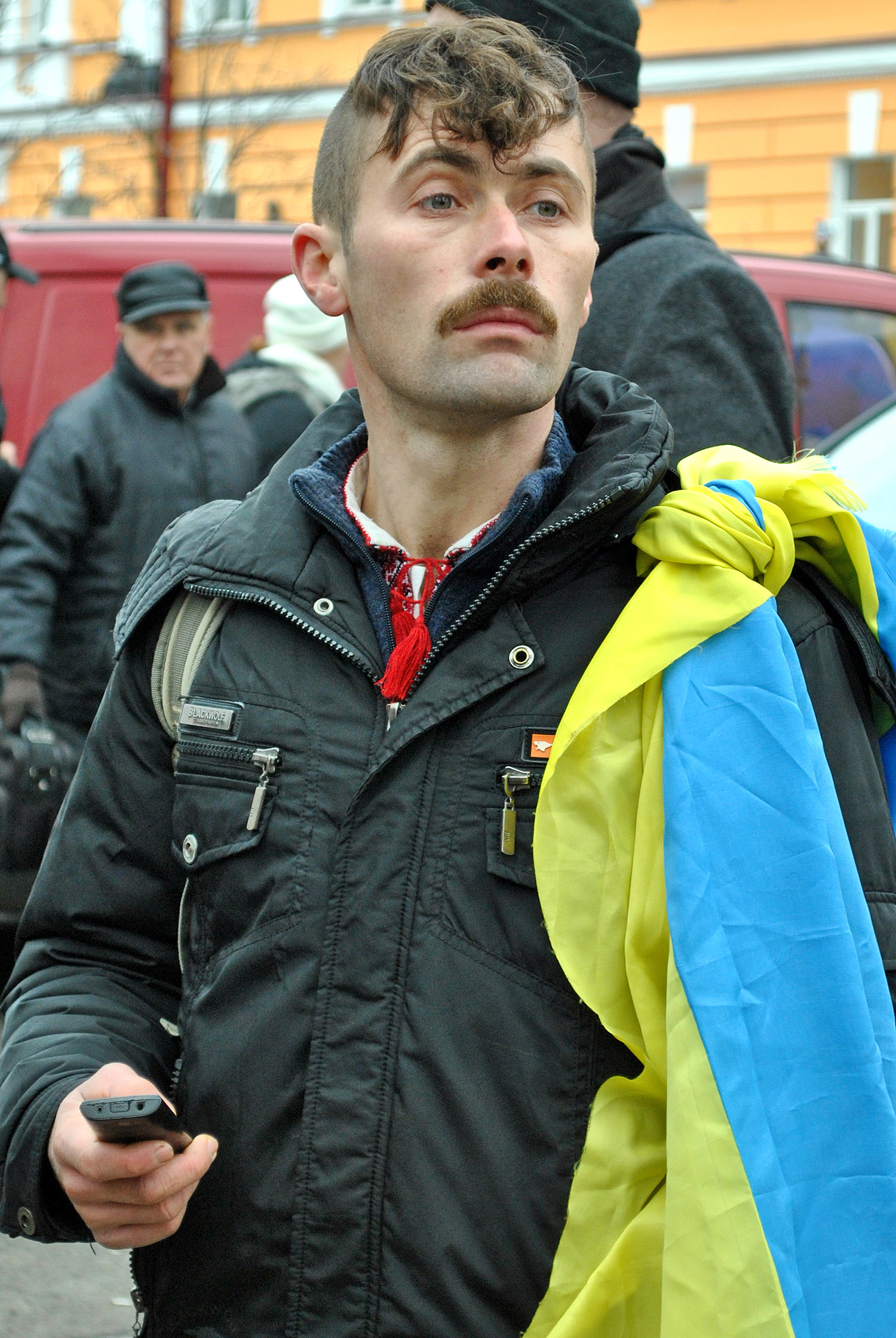
- Kapinos in 2013
- Born: 10 March 1984; Dunaiv, Ternopil oblast, USSR (now Ukraine)
- Died: 19 February 2014 (aged 29); Kyiv, Ukraine
- Cause of death: Gunshot wound
- Education: Ukrainian National Forestry University
- Occupations: Farmer; political activist; bandurist; accordionist; guitarist
- Political party: Svoboda
- Awards: Hero of Ukraine

Oleksandr Anatoliyovych Kapinos (Ukrainian: Олекса́ндр Анато́лійович Капіно́с; 10 March 1984 – 19 February 2014) was a Ukrainian farmer and political activist who is posthumously awarded the Hero of Ukraine in 2014. He is a member of the Svoboda party and took part in the clashes of Revolution of Dignity which resulted in his death.

== Early life and education ==
Born on 10 March 1984, in the Ukrainian village of Dunaiv. Kapinos graduated with a major in carpentry technique at the Ukrainian State Forestry University in Lviv (now the Ukrainian National Forestry University) in 2006, after completing his hometown school. One of the top pupils, he served a Polish internship. Working in Vinnytsia, he was the leader of the nationalist group Skolota in the area from 2008 to 2009. He went back to Ternopil Oblast in 2009 and started farming there.

== Career ==
Kapinos supported Ukrainian culture, restoration of customs, and was an engaged member of the community. He was the leader of the Patriot Volyn advocacy group. Together with starting sports organizations in the community, organizing musical groups, and leading local choirs, he was also an organizer of cultural and creative events for youth. Volunteered in summer camps for the underprivileged. He was the first to call for the removing of Soviet emblems from his hometown village and started the process of erecting a memorial honoring Taras Shevchenko.

Additionally, Kapinos was the driving force behind the first memorial in the region to be built in the village of Kulikiv, honoring those who fought for Ukraine's independence. He attended Ukrainian Insurgent Army marches and traveled to Kyiv annually for the Feast of the Intercession. He actively participated in the Orange Revolution in 2004. He took part in the Maidan Nezalezhnosti demonstration in Kyiv in 2012, when he was among the first to declare an indefinite hunger strike in opposition to a bill that intended to suppress the Ukrainian language.

Early in 2012, Kapinos stood up for the liberties of the locals and stopped a development that would have devastated the Kremenets Mountains' ecosystem from being built on his native Danube. He later took part in the Revolution of Dignity. He landed in Kyiv at the end of November 2013, just as Euromaidan was getting underway. He joined the 35th hundred Volynska Sich under the pseudonym Flint when Maidan Self-Defense was established. Against overwhelming odds, he and his team held the Trade Unions Building on 18 February 2014, during the evening attack on the Maidan.

It was around 10 p.m. when he sustained a head wound, severing an artery. After being transported to the Kyiv City Clinical Emergency Hospital, he underwent surgery there. The wound proved to be too serious, and he died at 09:37 on 19 February 2014. On 20 February, the Holy Liturgy was conducted at the Cathedral of the Immaculate Conception of the Blessed Virgin Mary in Ternopil on the day of sorrow in honor of those who were killed during the protests in Kyiv; including Kapinos and Ustym Holodnyuk. He was later buried in his village of Danube in Ternopil Oblast.

== Personal life ==
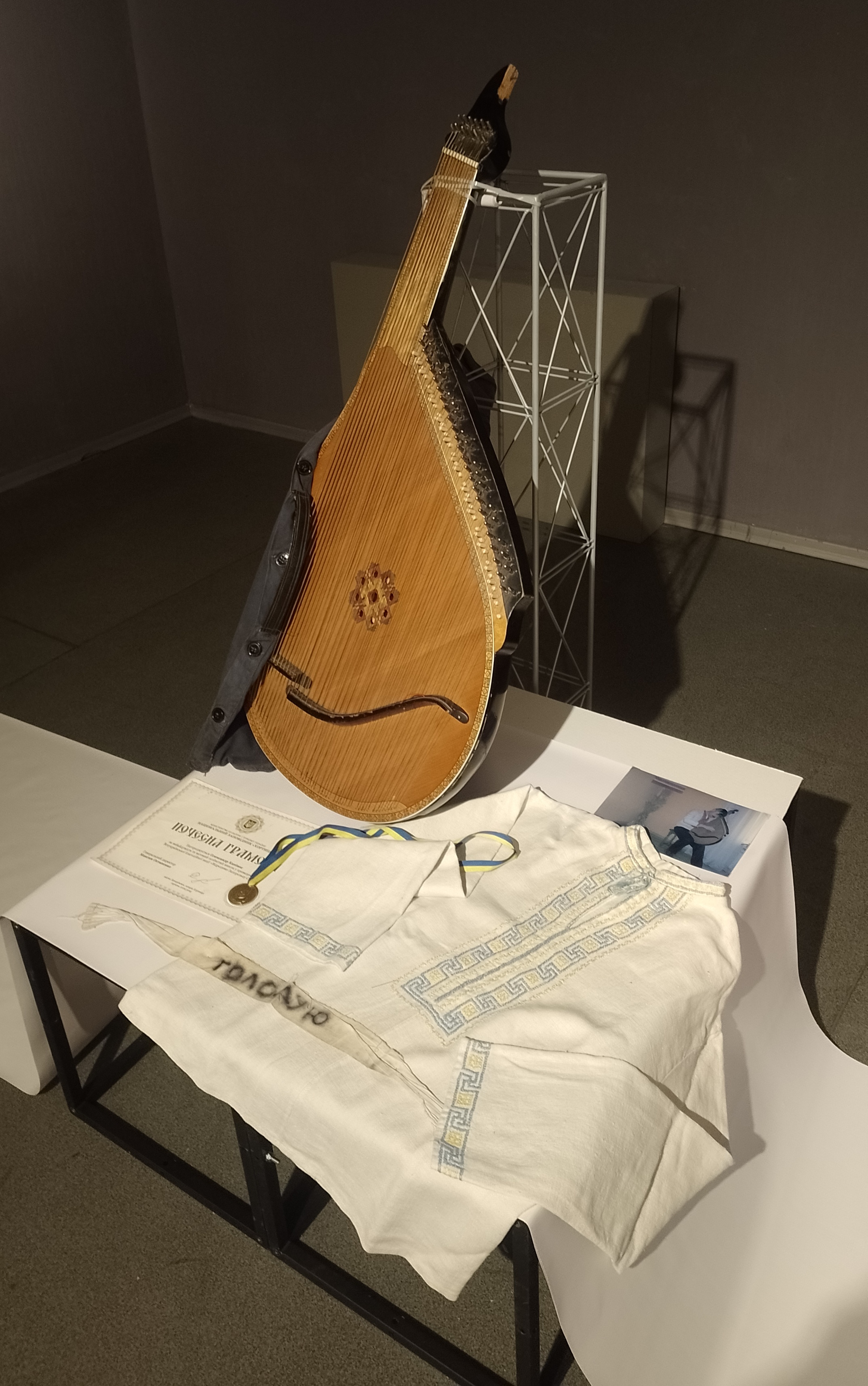
Kapinos's Bandura and the shirt he died in, on display at the Kyiv History Museum.

Kapinos was a bandurist, accordionist and guitarist. Following the Revolution of Dignity, his marriage to his girlfriend Olena Kotlyar was arranged. She stated that he died with the hope that his objectives will be met and that Ukraine will be pleased with its sons.

== Awards and recognitions ==
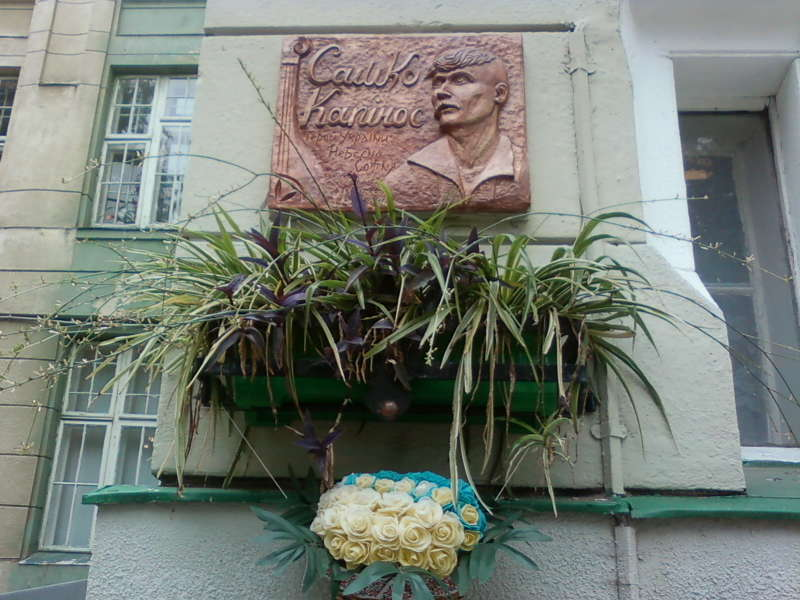
Memorial plaque at the university's no. 2 building

A memorial plaque honoring Kapinos was formally opened on 10 March, at Kulykiv, Kremenets Raion. On 24 August 2014, Independence Day, a monument in Dunaiv honoring the Hero of the Heavenly Hundred was unveiled, featuring his statue. 2014 saw the naming of a Dunaiv street in his honor. On 10 March 2016, his birthday, a commemorative plaque in Vinnytsia was unveiled. On his close friend and regional council deputy Volodymyr Bartsyos's suggestion, it was put in his household. A memorial plaque was also erected at the building no. 2 of the Ukrainian National Forestry University.

Kapinos has received awards and recognitions such as:

- Hero of Ukraine Order of the Golden Star (posthumously; 21 November 2014)
- Medal "For Sacrifice and Love for Ukraine" (posthumously; 4 July 2015)
- Honorary Diploma of the Ukrainian Catholic Archeparchy of Kyiv (posthumously; 8 May 2016)
