= Kresowa księga sprawiedliwych =

Polish historical book

The Book of the Righteous of the Eastern Borderlands (Polish: Kresowa księga sprawiedliwych) is a book by the Institute of National Remembrance (Poland) that gathers testimonies of humanity of Ukrainians during the Ukrainian-Polish ethnic conflict and Massacres of Poles in Volhynia, covering the years 1939 to 1945.

The book refers to 882 cases of aid provided by 1,341 persons allowing for 2,527 lives to be saved. The identities of 896 rescuers have been established. Also included are reports of 384 cases of rescuers who were murdered in punitive aftermath.
