= Mykola Petrovych Chaikovsky =

Ukrainian naturalist (1922–2011)

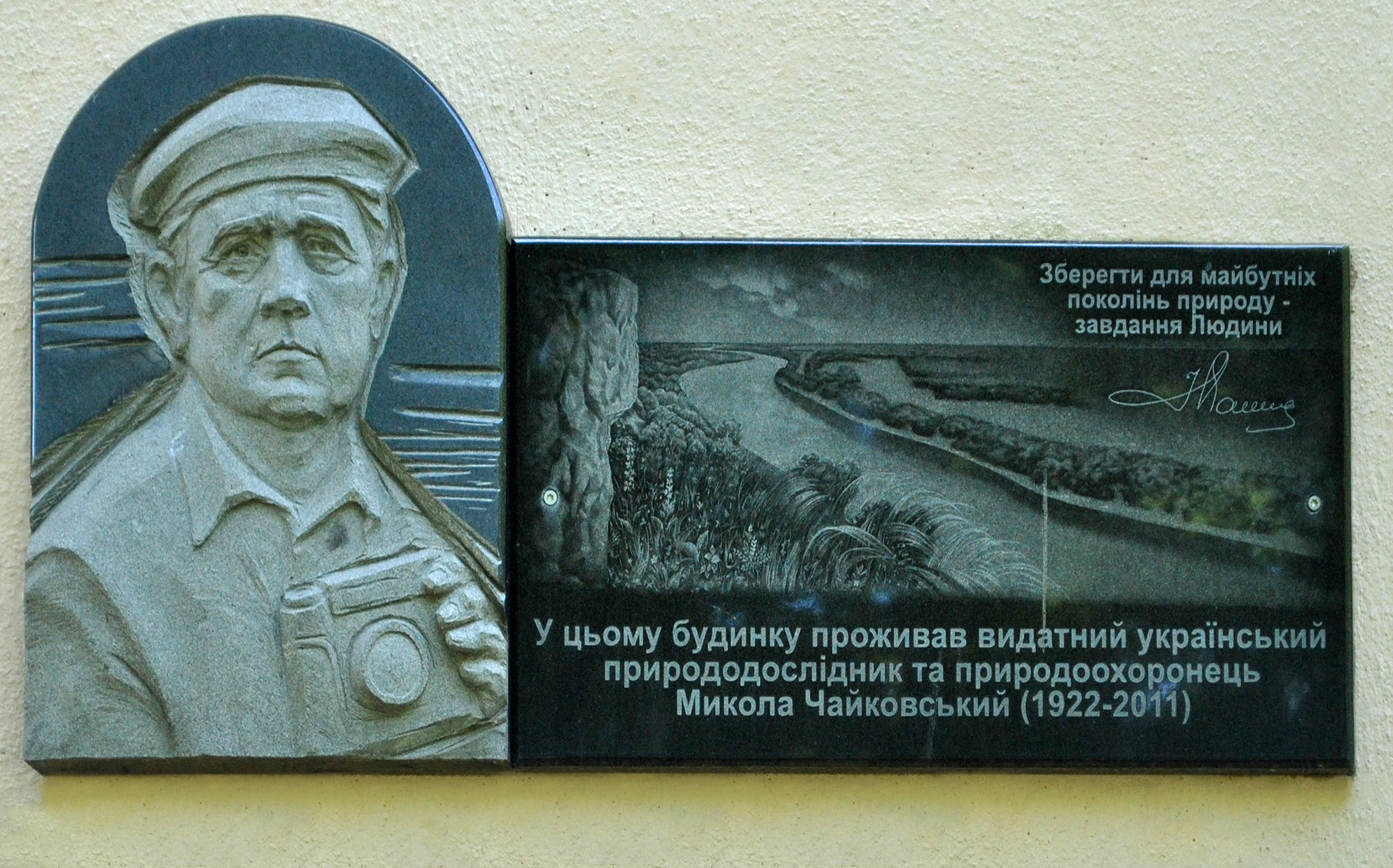
Commemorative plaque on Volodymyr Vynnychenko Street in Ternopil.

Mykola Petrovych Chaikovsky (Ukrainian: Микола Петрович Чайковський; 2 September 1922 – 2011) was a Ukrainian naturalist, conservationist, and environmentalist. He helped contribute to the establishment of over 500 protected areas in the Ternopil area of western Ukraine, including the newer concept of a Regional Landscape Park. Notable parks he helped create include the Medobory Nature Reserve, the Kremenets Mountains and Dniester Canyon nature parks, Holitsky Botanical and Entomological Sanctuary, and the Dniester Canyon Regional Landscape Park.
