= Collegium Nobilium =

Collegium Nobilium may refer to:

- Collegium Nobilium (Olomouc), a college established in 1725 in Olomouc, Moravia.
- Collegium Nobilium (Warsaw), an elite boarding secondary school for sons of magnates and wealthy gentry (szlachta), founded in 1740 in Warsaw by Stanisław Konarski.
- Collegium Nobilium, a college established by the Jesuit order in Warsaw operating 1752 - 1777.
- Collegium Nobilium (Paris), School of Polish Language and Culture founded in February 2012. Is also the name of Polish Scouts group at the same school.

== See also ==
- Collegium Nordicum, a papal seminary established by the University of Olomouc in 1578 and by the Collegium Hosianum in 1581.
