= Piarist College, Podolínec =

Piarist College in Podolínec
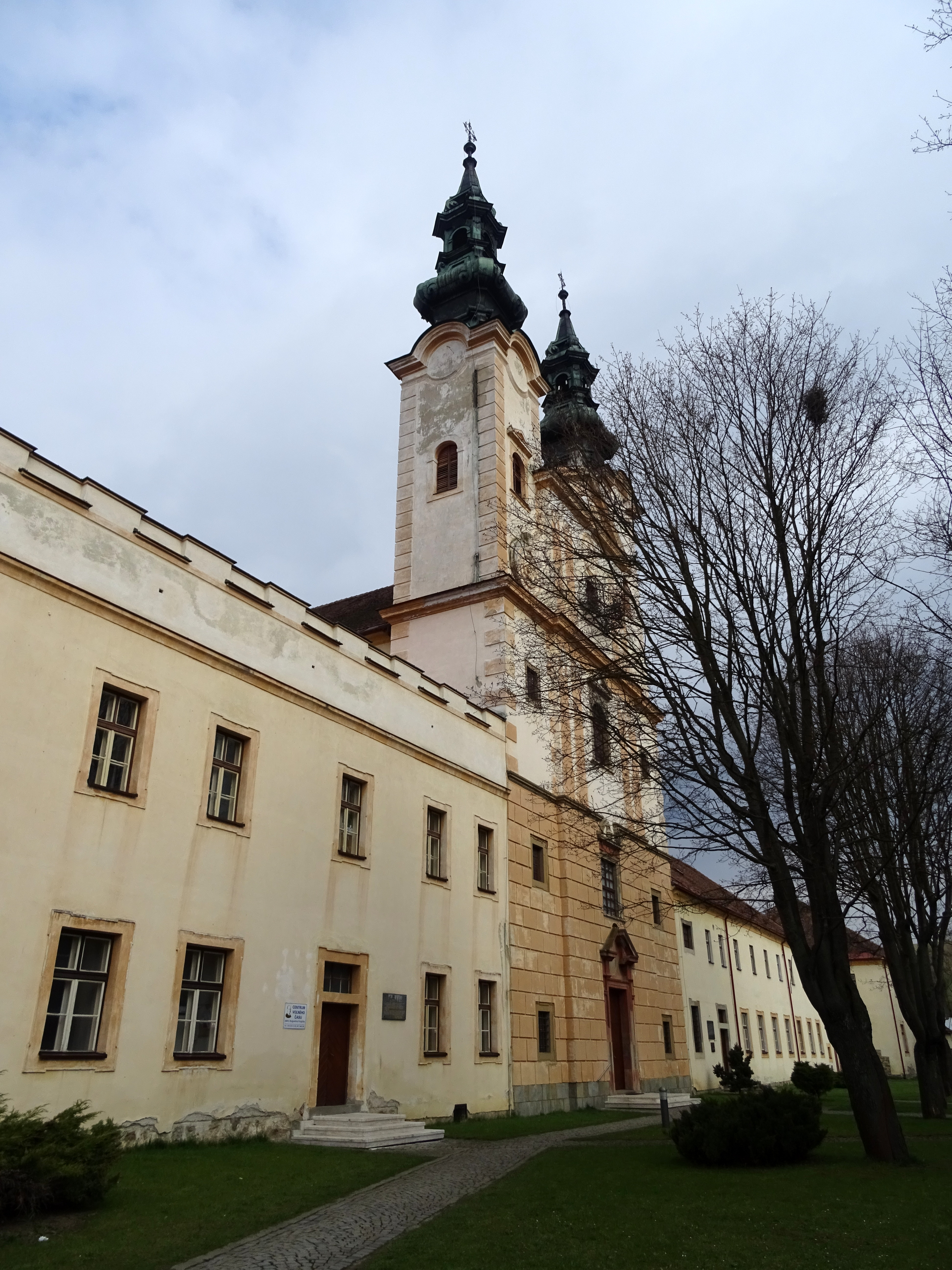
- Former Piarist college and monastery in Podolínec

Location
- Spiš; Podolínec; Slovakia; 49.2590°N 20.5363°E

Information
- Type: Piarist college and gymnasium
- Religious affiliation: Catholic Church
- Established: 1642
- Founder: Stanisław Lubomirski
- Closed: 1919

The Piarist College in Podolínec was a Piarist school established in 1642 in Podolínec, in the Spiš region of present-day Slovakia. Founded under Polish patronage, it became an important centre of education in the Polish–Lithuanian Commonwealth and the surrounding regions. The college, later reorganised as a gymnasium, operated until 1919, with an interruption in the mid-19th century.

== History ==
The college was founded in 1642 by Stanisław Lubomirski, Voivode of Kraków and starosta of Spiš. At the time, Podolínec was one of the thirteen towns of Spiš administered by the Polish Crown. As early as 1633, King Władysław IV Vasa and Stanisław Lubomirski expressed an interest in bringing the Piarists to Poland. However, the order was initially reluctant to establish a presence there due to a shortage of members familiar with Slavic languages. It was only the threat posed by the ongoing Thirty Years' War that prompted twelve Piarists from Lipník nad Bečvou in Moravia to seek refuge in Poland. This directly led to the establishment of two Piarist schools: the Collegium Regium in Warsaw and the college founded by Lubomirski in Podolínec.

The school officially opened on 18 June 1643, with 189 students enrolled. Initially accommodated in the local castle, they subsequently moved into buildings provided by Lubomirski, which included a monastery, a novitiate and residential facilities for students. Construction of the complex was completed in 1648, while work on the interiors continued until 1651. Its first rector was John Dominic Franchi (1595–1662). The college soon developed a reputation for the quality of its teaching, attracting students from different parts of the Polish–Lithuanian Commonwealth and neighbouring territories.

The curriculum included Latin, grammar, poetics, rhetoric, philosophy, mathematics, astronomy and military engineering. The institution maintained a library and an archive containing school registers, chronicles and manuscripts. It also operated a school theatre, which initially staged performances in Latin and subsequently in Polish. The college admitted students from various social and ethnic backgrounds, including Poles, Slovaks, Ruthenians, Hungarians and Germans. Its pupils also included Roman Catholics, Eastern Catholics, Orthodox Christians and Protestants. The attendance of Greek Catholic students from the Carpathian region has been documented in historical research based on surviving school registers.

Following the Habsburg occupation of the Polish-administered part of Spiš in 1769, the college gradually lost its Polish character. In 1782, the Piarist house was transferred from the Polish to the Hungarian province of the order. The use of Polish as a language of instruction was subsequently discontinued in favour of German and later Latin.

The gymnasium was closed by the Austrian authorities in 1850 but reopened in the 1866–1867 school year as a lower gymnasium. Attempts to expand its curriculum in the early 20th century were unsuccessful because of declining enrolment. The school was finally closed by the Czechoslovak authorities at the end of the 1918–1919 academic year.

== Notable people ==
One of the college's most prominent teachers was Stanisław Konarski (1700–1773), a Polish Piarist priest and educational reformer. He entered the novitiate at Podolínec in August 1715 and took his religious vows there in 1717. During his subsequent years at the college, he studied philosophy and taught syntax, poetics, humanities and rhetoric. He remained at Podolínec until August 1722, when he was transferred to the Piarist college in Warsaw. Two of his elder brothers, Antoni and Ignacy Konarski, were also members of the Piarist order.

Another notable pupil was Józef Stolarczyk (1816–1893), a Polish Roman Catholic priest, mountaineer and the first parish priest of Zakopane, who attended three classes at the Piarist gymnasium in Podolínec.

== Buildings and later history ==
The college formed part of a Baroque monastic complex erected outside the medieval town walls between 1642 and 1648. Construction was supervised by the Viennese master builder Pochsberger. The complex included a church dedicated to Saint Stanislaus of Szczepanów, Bishop of Kraków and martyr. The monastery buildings were arranged around two courtyards separated by the church, whose twin towers became a distinctive feature of the town's skyline.

Following the closure of the gymnasium in 1919, parts of the complex were occupied by the military. In 1922, Bishop Ján Vojtaššák invited the Redemptorists to establish a community in the former Piarist monastery. The Redemptorists subsequently undertook restoration work on the buildings. In April 1950, following the communist government's suppression of male religious orders in Czechoslovakia under Action K, the monastery was converted into a detention and centralisation facility for members of religious orders. Monks and priests from various communities were forcibly confined there under a restrictive regime. The facility operated until 1951.

In 1918, the college's library, which then contained approximately 10,000 volumes, was incorporated into the University Library in Bratislava. In 1975, the collection was transferred to Matica slovenská in Martin, and in 1997 to the Piarist monastery in Nitra, where it remains to this day. Despite these relocations, the collection has survived largely intact. More than 9,000 items have been preserved, including approximately 1,200 works in Polish.

== Bibliography ==
- Skłodowski, Jan (2017). "Podoliniec – "spiski Oksford"" [Podolínec – the "Oxford of Spiš"]. Pamiętnik Polskiego Towarzystwa Tatrzańskiego (in Polish). 25: 133–164.
- Skłodowski, Jan (2019). Zapomniane uczelnie Rzeczypospolitej [Forgotten Educational Institutions of the Commonwealth] (in Polish). Warsaw: Narodowy Instytut Polskiego Dziedzictwa Kulturowego za Granicą POLONIKA. ISBN 978-83-66172-02-9.
