= Adam Naruszewicz =

Polish nobleman and writer (1733–1796)

Adam Stanisław Naruszewicz S.J.
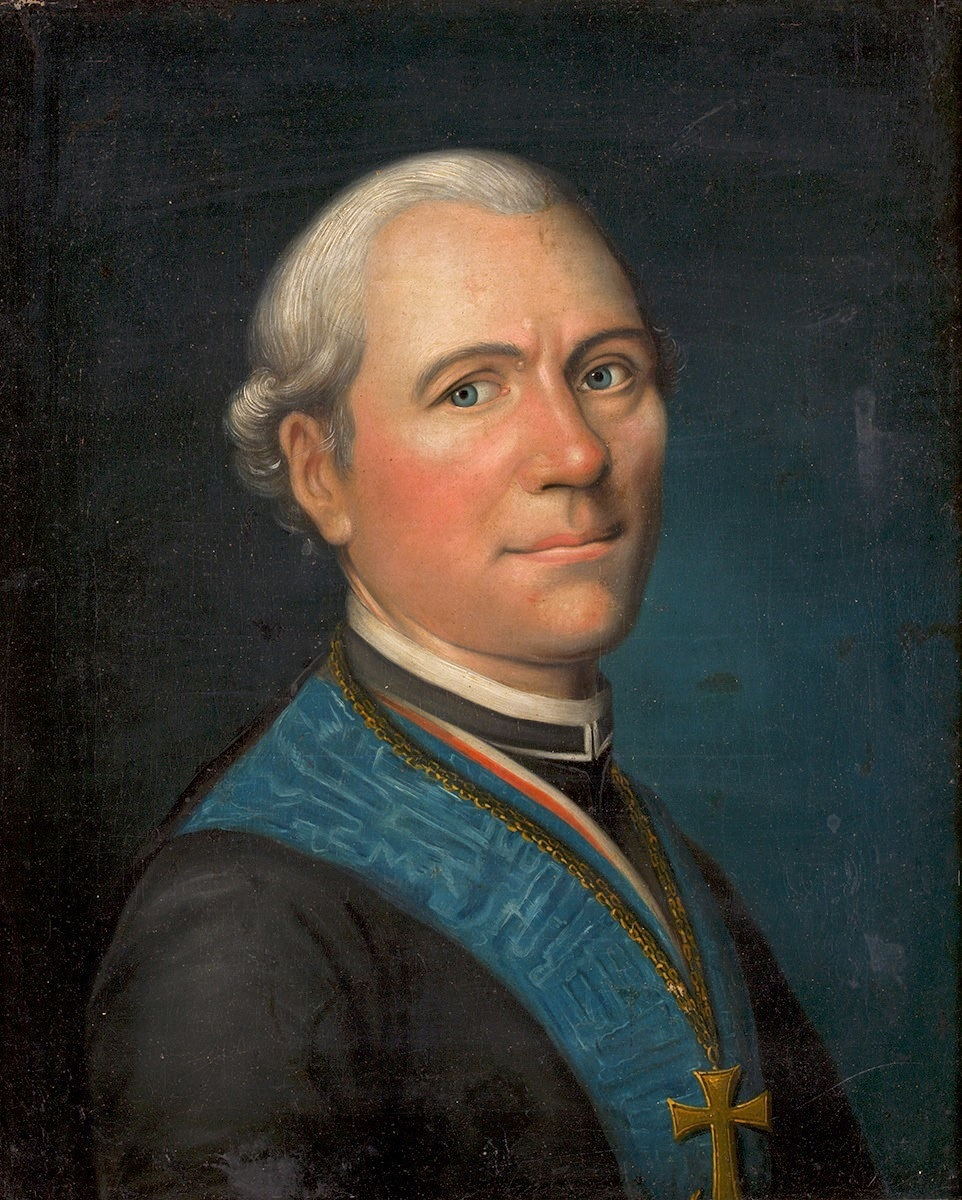
- Diocese: Lutsk
- In office: 1790–1796

Orders
- Ordination: 1762

Personal details
- Born: 20 October 1733 Polesie
- Died: 8 July 1796 (aged 62) Janów Podlaski
- Denomination: Roman Catholicism

Adam Stanisław Naruszewicz (Lithuanian: Adomas Naruševičius; 20 October 1733 – 8 July 1796) was a Polish nobleman, poet, historian, dramatist, translator, publicist, Jesuit and Roman Catholic bishop.

Born in a szlachta family, he went on to become a close advisor to the Polish king Stanisław August Poniatowski, a titular bishop of Smolensk (1775–1790), bishop of Łuck (1790–1796), and a member of the government of the Polish-Lithuanian Commonwealth through his seat in the Permanent Council (1781–1786).

He has been described as one of the most significant writers of the Polish Enlightenment. In his early years he wrote poems and dramas, before focusing on historical research and becoming one of the first modern Polish historians. An author of the seven volumes of Historia narodu polskiego (History of the Polish Nation), a highly influential work on the early Polish historiography, he is responsible for popularizing the term "Piast dynasty" for describing the first dynasty of Poland.

== Life ==
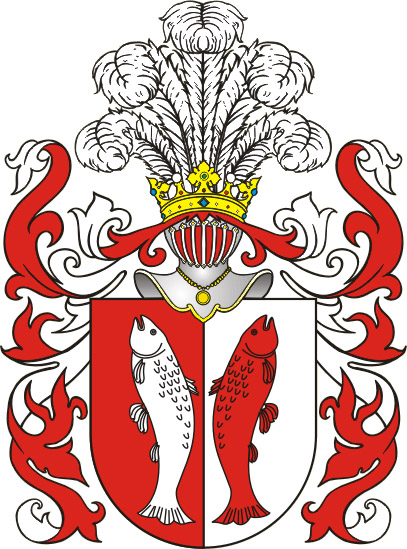
Wadwicz coat of arms, used by Naruszewicz

The Naruszewicz family belonged to the middle class szlachta (Polish-Lithuanian nobility) who held local government offices and had a small estate in Polesie region of the Polish–Lithuanian Commonwealth, where Adam Naruszewicz likely was born.^{[a]} He started his education in a Jesuit school in Pinsk. Naruszewicz joined the Jesuit Order on 14 August 1748, and shortly afterward he began studying and from 1753 lecturing in grammar at the Vilnius University. He taught rhetoric at the Jesuits' elite boarding university, Collegium Nobilium in Warsaw from 1757. Between around 1758 and 1762 he studied theology at the Collège de la Trinité in Lyon, France. He received the holy orders in the nearby Vienne on 17 January 1762. During his time in Western Europe he visited Germany, Italy and Spain and met the Polish Queen of France, Marie Leszczyńska, during an audience at Versailles. Upon his return to the Polish–Lithuanian Commonwealth, he resumed his position as a lecturer in the Collegium Nobilium, now also teaching French language, poetics, geography and history; in 1767-1768 he held some lectures at the military school, the Corps of Cadets.

Naruszewicz was introduced to the Polish king Stanisław August Poniatowski by Prince Adam Kazimierz Czartoryski in 1764. He was the editor of the Zabawy Przyjemne i Pożyteczne—the first Polish literary magazine, published in the years 1770–1777, and a prominent regular at the artistic gatherings, known as the Thursday Lunches, hosted by the king. Also a prolific writer, Naruszewicz received the Medal Merentibus from the king in 1771—an award in recognition of his literary achievements. Around that time, he was already counted as one of Poniatowski's most vocal supporters, advisors and allies. The Jesuit Order was suppressed in 1773, but the king arranged a number of church positions for Naruszewicz. Initially, he held positions at parishes. He was appointed coadjutor bishop in the Roman Catholic Diocese of Smolensk, and he was consecrated bishop of the titular see of Emmaus on 25 May 1775. He became the diocesan bishop of Smolensk in 1788, and bishop of Łuck in 1790. Poniatowski awarded him with the Order of Saint Stanislaus in 1776, and the Order of the White Eagle in 1783.

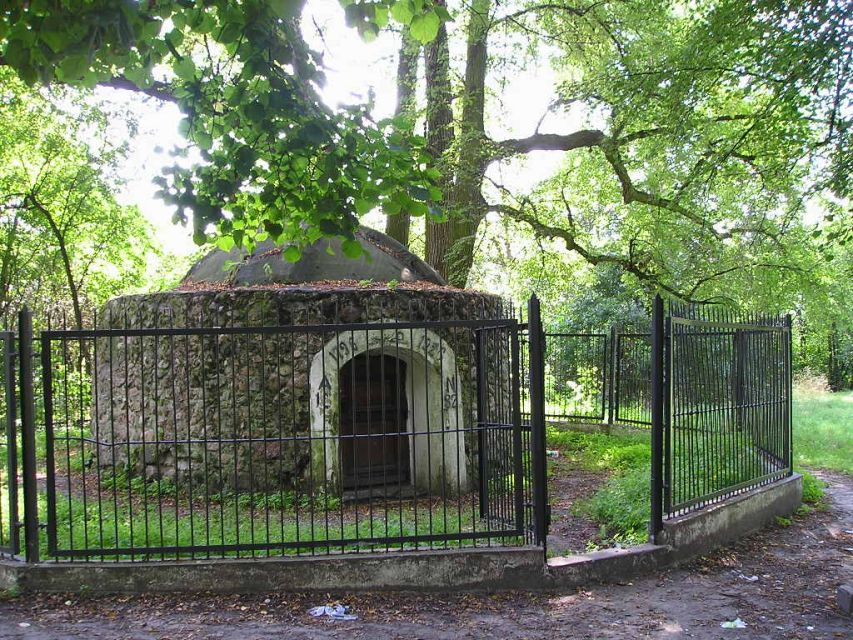
"Naruszewicz's Cave" in Janów Podlaski, a retreat favored late in Naruszewicz's life

From 1781 to 1786 he was a member of the Permanent Council, the highest administrative authority in the Polish–Lithuanian Commonwealth, and also held the court rank of Great Lithuanian Scribe. As a member of the Senate of Polish-Lithuanian Commonwealth he participated in the Great Sejm, aiding Poniatowski's faction's attempts to reform the country. He was a supporter of the Constitution of 3 May 1791. and one of the Friends of the Constitution. He acted as the "king's whip" in the Senate, although he did not play a major role in the parliamentary debates, acting mostly as a writer and organizer. During the first two years of the Great Sejm, he was a disciplined parliamentarian, attending all meetings, and involved in all resolutions submitted to the session. From 1790, however, started to withdraw from political life, and he spent much time at his residence at Janów Podlaski, the seat of the bishops of Łuck. In 1792 he suffered from a heart attack. After the Polish defeat in the Polish–Russian War that year and Poniatowski's enforced entrance to the pro-Russian Targowica Confederation (which Naruszewicz also joined), he withdrew from the political life, not attending the Grodno Sejm, and spent his last years at Janów Podlaski. Although his health was failing, he was supportive of the Kościuszko Insurrection, which necessitated him to briefly seek refuge abroad during the conflict. He returned to Janów Podlaski afterwards, where he died on 8 July 1796, shortly after the Third Partition of Poland ended the existence of the Commonwealth. He is buried in the Collegiate Basilica of the Holy Trinity in Janów Podlaski.

== Works ==
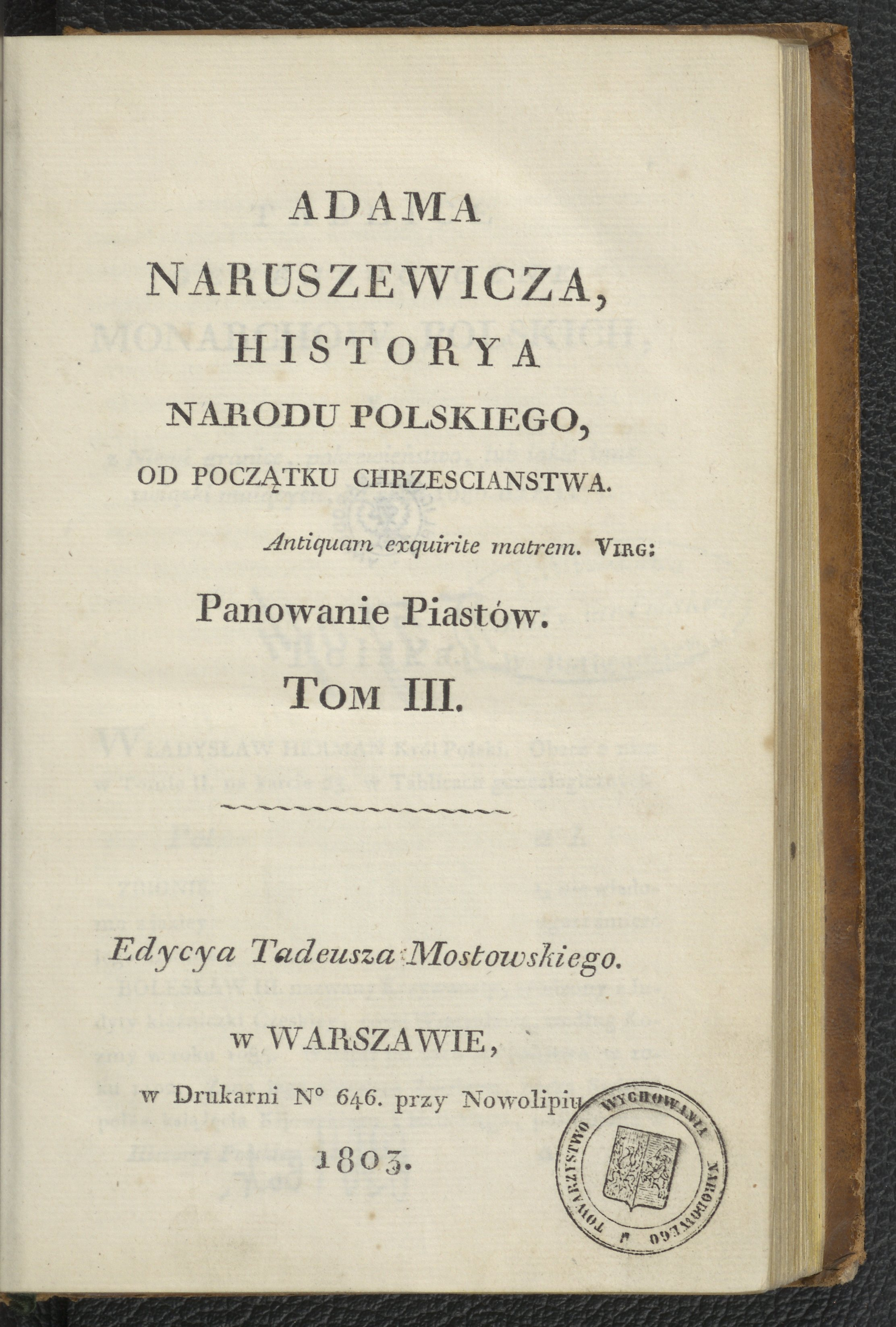
Title page, 1803 edition of volume III of Naruszewicz's History of the Polish Nation

Naruszewicz was a prolific writer (in both Polish and Latin), beginning his literary career in the late 1740s, with his first published work, a poem dedicated to Jan Mikołaj Chodkiewicz, debuting in 1756, followed by his first research pamphlet a year later. He wrote odes, idylls, satires, fairy tales, epigrams, and rococo poems; many of those were praising Poniatowski, although those panegyric works are rarely considered his best. He also wrote a tame drama, aimed at the youth, Gwido, hrabia Blezu (1770). He also was active as a publisher and as a translator of Latin and French works into Polish—he translated works of authors such as Anacreon, Horace, Tacitus, as well as modern Latin-writing authors such as Pole Maciej Kazimierz Sarbiewski and Swiss Salomon Gessner. He was the first person to translate the works of Tacitus to Polish.

In his later life, he moved away from writing fiction, focusing on historical research. His historical works include a monography on hetman Jan Karol Chodkiewicz (published in 1781) and over 130 shorter biographies of other notable individuals. Chodkiewicz's biography was his first published work extensively based on archival records. His works also include political pamphlets in support of Poniatowski's faction, mostly focused on the subject of political history with implications for the modern era. His historical research culminated in the seven volumes of Historia narodu polskiego ("History of the Polish Nation"), mostly written in the years 1776–1779 and published in the subsequent decades. This ambitious project, inspired by the works of Voltaire, the first modern attempt to compile a comprehensive history of Poland, was unfinished, as Naruszewicz only completed the volumes covering Polish history up to the end of the Piast dynasty in the 14th century. With his growing involvement in the political life, Naruszewicz's historical research mostly stopped by late 1780s; however until early 1790s he was compiling historical documents, known as Teki Naruszewicza ("Naruszewicz's Folders"). Although unpublished during his life, they later became a valuable archive to future historians, containing well organized documents, including copies of now-lost texts.

== Import ==
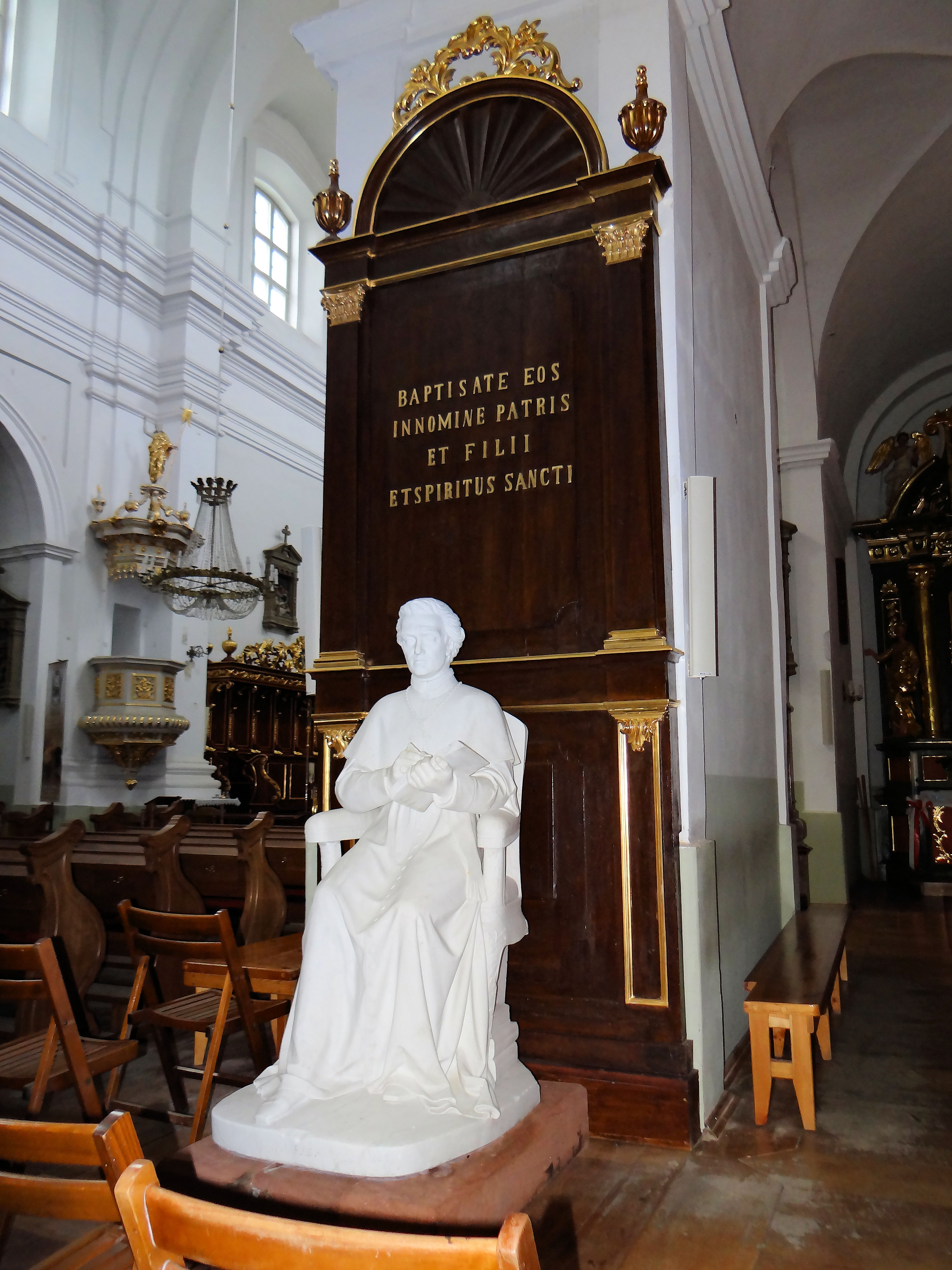
Statue of Naruszewicz, Holy Trinity Church, Janów Podlaski

He is described by D.R. Woolf as "one of the founders of the Polish Enlightenment", and by Barbara Wolska as "one of the most significant poets of the Polish Enlightenment", and the most significant poet associated with the Poniatowski's political faction. Julian Platt saw him as the leading Polish literary figure of the early Enlightenment, before that position was taken over by Ignacy Krasicki. His literary work has been described by Wolskaand Platt as fitting in the spirit of The Enlightenment, although formally—through their form and language—still displaying many similarities to the styles of the previous era (baroque, classicism, sentimentalism and rococo). Naruszewicz has been credited by them with initiating a number of changes in the style of Polish literature and being one of the Polish originators of the novelty of the Enlightenment ideas expressed in poetry. His works have inspired a number of following writers.

According to Norman Davies and John D. Stanley, Naruszewicz has also been named among the first modern Polish historians. In particular, he was also the first modern historian who used the term Piast dynasty for describing the first dynasty of Poland, popularizing it in the subsequent historiography. According to Platt, he was the most significant Polish historian until Joachim Lelewel. In Polish historiography, there is a distinction between the "Naruszewicz school", supporting monarchy and strong central power, and the more liberal-republican "Lelewel school". Just like his literary work, his historical research and writings have been influenced by the philosophy of Enlightenment, this is visible both in his methodology and philosophy (adhering to concepts such as didacticism, empiricism, humanitarianism, pragmatism, scepticism about tradition, secularism, and utilitarianism), his vernacular writing style, and his goals, such as his emphasis on studying domestic politics, endorsing a strong monarchy, and a pride in national accomplishments (including his support for the usage of Polish language in literature).John D. Stanley praised him for his "enormous respect for truth", visible in his methodology, full of critical analysis - including discussion of contradictory accounts, and extensive and detailed references to sources.

== Awards ==
- Medal Merentibus (1771)
- Order of Saint Stanislaus (11 V 1776)
- Knight of the Order of the White Eagle (1783)

== See also ==
- List of Poles

== Notes ==
a. His exact birthplace is unknown. He was christened in Lohishyn near Pinsk.
