= Zenon Kazimierz Wysłouch =

Odyniec, the family coat of arms.

Zenon Kazimierz Wysłouch (1727–1805) was a chamberlain of the Brzeskie Voivodeship and a member of the Great Sejm.

Born on the Leżajka family estate (Polesie, currently Belarus) as the first son of Antoni Stanisław and Joanna Kościa-Zbirohowska, Zenon was educated at Jesuit and Piarist Collegiums and later at the elite Collegium Nobilium in Warsaw.

In 1750 he returned to Brzeski region to become the secretary of the lesser seal and in 1758 he was nominated as the sword bearer of the Brzeskie Voivodeship, a member of the Head Tribunal and a scribe of the Treasury Tribunal in Minsk. In 1781 Zenon became the chamberlain (podkomorzy) of the Brzeskie Voivodeship.

In 1790-1792 Zenon was a member of the Great Sejm for the Brzeskie Voivodeship, the Polish parliament that created the Polish constitution, the second oldest in the World. He was associated with Adam Kazimierz Czartoryski's Patriotic Party, a political movement advocating reforms aiming to secure Poland's independence from Russia.

In 1766 Zenon married Honorata Oreszko and received her family's Pirkowicze estate as a dowry. In place of the ruined house erected there in the 16th century by the bishop Cyryl Terlecki, the co founder of the Union of Brest, Wysłouch built a manor house surrounded by an elegant park. He also funded the construction of a unionist church in Pirkowicze, where he was later buried.

== See also ==
- Great Sejm
- Wysłouch family
