= Marcelina Darowska =

Polish religious sister (1827–1911)

Blessed Marcelina Darowska
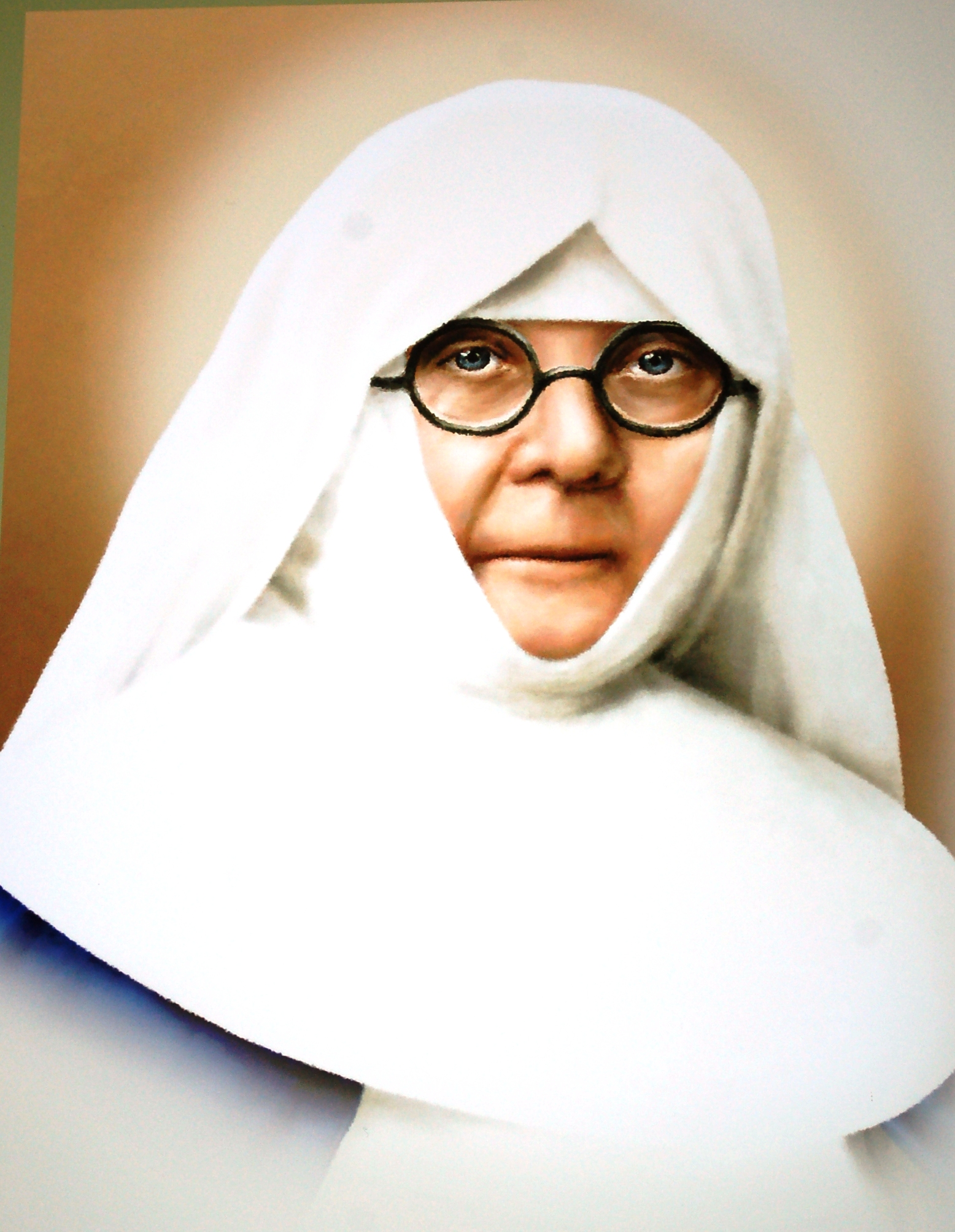
- Born: 16 January 1827; Szulaki, Poland (now in Ukraine)
- Died: 5 January 1911 (aged 83); Jazłowiec, Poland (now in Ukraine)
- Venerated in: Roman Catholic Church
- Beatified: 6 October 1996, Rome by Pope John Paul II

Marcelina Darowska (16 January 1827 – 5 January 1911) was a Polish religious sister who was beatified by Pope John Paul II in 1996. She was inspired to co-found the Sisters of the Immaculate Conception of the Blessed Virgin Mary, a congregation in Poland, Belarus and Ukraine.

== Childhood and marriage ==
Marcelina (or Marcellina) Kotowicz was born in Szulaki, a part of Poland that was controlled by the Russians at the time. Her parents, Jan and Maksymilia Kotowicz, were wealthy landowners. She attended a school in Odessa for three years, before working on her father's farm.

Some sources state that she was pious from a young age. Before his death, her father made her promise that she would marry and start a family. On 2 October 1849 she married Karol Darowski, a land owner from Podolia. He died of typhus three years later, leaving her with two children, Jozef and Karolina. A year after that, her son died. This series of tragedies influenced her thoughts; she claimed that she no longer belonged to any earthly being but rather to only God. Weakened by the traumatic experiences, she was sent abroad for medical treatment. She traveled to Berlin, then to Paris, and finally to Rome, arriving on 11 April 1853. In Rome she met Father Hieronim Kajsiewicz, a priest of the Resurrectionist Congregation, who became her spiritual director. On 12 May 1854 she made private vows before him. Kajsiewicz introduced her to a nun, Maria Józefa of the Crucified Christ (Józefa Karska), who became a close friend.

Marcelina had to return to Podolia to look after her daughter. Troubles and worries accompanying the upbringing of sickly Karolcia, as well as the family's opposition to her plans related to religious life. While managing the estate in Żerdz, she started social and educational work, helping peasants to become independent after the enfranchisement. Whilst in Poland, she decided to found a religious community dedicated to the education and support of women.

== Foundress ==
At the age of 27, she returned to Rome, and with Father Kajsiewicz and Józefa Karska set about forming the congregation. The Congregation of the Sisters of the Immaculate Conception of the Blessed Virgin Mary was established in Rome in 1857. When Karska died from typhus in 1860, Darowska became the Superior of the small congregation. In 1863 she moved the community to Jazłowiec in the Archdiocese of Lviv. She opened a convent and a middle school for girls, Jazłowiec College, in the donated Poniatowski palace close to the ruins of the local fortress. This soon became an important spiritual and cultural centre.

Also in 1863 the congregation received the decretum laudis from Pope Pius IX, who said, in blessing her work: "This congregation is for Poland". In 1874 the final approval was confirmed, and in 1889 the constitutions were accepted. In 1883 the congregation erected a statue of the Immaculate Conception of the Godmother in the convent's chapel. It was blessed by Archbishop Sigismund Felix Feliński, and in 1939 crowned by the Polish primate August Cardinal Hlond.

So many girls came to the convent school in Jazłowiec that 10 years after its opening, the construction of another one in Jarosław on the San River began. The monastery in Słonim in Lithuania, where the sisters worked in hiding for 11 years, was of a special concern. During her 50 years' activity as superior of the congregation, Darowska opened free primary schools for children from nearby villages and neighborhoods at all houses of the congregation.

At her death on 5 January 1911 in Jazłowiec at the age of 83 she left seven convents with 350 sisters. Her ashes are in Jazłowiec and at the generalate in Szymanów.

== Approach and meaning ==
In 1904, the Polish writer Henryk Sienkiewicz wrote: "Praise for your wise work and honour to your merit and goodness". Darowska answered: "I do not look at the results (praise) of our work. Those results do not belong to us. If they exist, they belong to God, for the good of our beloved and divided country".

… to extend the kingdom of God in human souls and bring it into the world - this was the programme for her apostolic activity, born in the silence of a heart immersed in prayer. She wanted to do everything so that truth, love and goodness would triumph in human life and transform the face of her beloved nation. Together with her sisters, she generously laboured in the exhausting task of building the kingdom of Christ, paying particular attention to the religious training of the young generation, especially girls, to the growth of catechesis and to educational. She assigned a particular role in life to the Christian woman as wife, mother and citizen of her country … The new blessed is an example of an apostolic faith that creates new ways for the Church to be present in the world and forms a more just and human society which abides and bears fruit in Christ."

— Pope John Paul II, from the proclamation of the beatification of Marcelina Darowska, 6 October 1996
