= Seweryn Wysłouch =

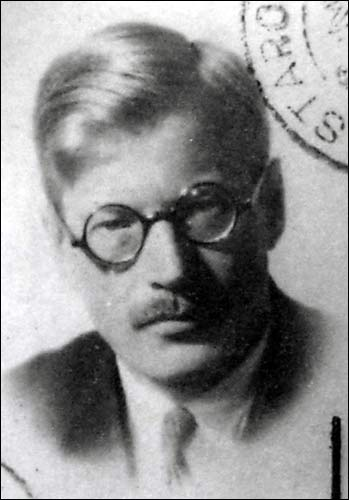
Seweryn Wysłouch

Seweryn Wysłouch (March 19, 1900 in Pirkowicze near Drohiczyn – February 28, 1968 in Wrocław) was a legal historian and vice-rector of University of Wrocław.

== Biography ==
Wysłouch was born in Pirkowicze near Drohiczyn (Polesie, Poland), the Wysłouch family manor. In 1927 he graduated from the School of Law and Social Sciences of the Stefan Batory University in Vilnius and began to work there as an academic. His career was interrupted by the outbreak of the Second World War, but he continued it from 1945 at the University of Wrocław as a professor. During the years of 1947 to 1952 he was the vice-rector (vice-chancellor) of the university and from 1956 to 1958 he headed its School of Law

Wysłouch was equally involved in numerous initiatives outside of the university. During the inter-war period he was a member of the Senior Ramblers Club (Klub Włóczęgów Seniorów), a small, influential academic society linked to Marshal Józef Piłsudski and his government. In 1948 he took part in the organisation of the Regained Territories Exhibition and from 1949 to 1953 he presided over the Wrocław branch of the Western Institute, a scientific research society focusing on the Western provinces of Poland. Wysłouch co-founded the Silesian Institute in Opole and was its president from 1957 to 1960.

== Selected works ==
- "Posługi komunikacyjne w miastach W. Ks. Litewskiego na prawie magdeburskiem do połowy xvi w.". Vilnius, Nakł. Instytutu Naukowo-Badawczego Europy Wschodniej, 1937.
- "Studia nad koncentracją w rolnictwie śląskim w latach 1850-1914 : Struktura agrarna i jej zmiany". Wrocław, Ossolineum.
- ""Powiat" w statucie litewskim 1529 r. oraz w spisie wojska litewskiego 1528 r.", Vilnius, 1931.
- "Rola Komunistycznej Partii Zachodniej Białorusi w ruchu narodowym Białorusinów w Polsce". Vilnius, 1933.

== Bibliography ==
- Karol Jonca, Seweryn Wysłouch, w: Uczeni wrocławscy (1945-1979) (pod redakcją Jana Trzynadlowskiego), Ossolineum, Wrocław 1980
- Słownik historyków polskich (pod redakcją Marii Prosińskiej-Jackl), Wiedza Powszechna, Warszawa 1994
