= Ignacy Nagurczewski =

Polish writer, translator, educator, and Jesuit

Ignacy Nagurczewski (22 March 1725 – 26 January 1811) was a Polish writer, translator, educator, and Jesuit. He is known for translating Homer's Iliad and Odyssey into Polish. He was a lecturer at the prestigious Collegium Nobilium in Warsaw.
