= Chłapowski =

Chłapowski (Polish pronunciation: [xwaˈpɔfski]; feminine: Chłapowska) is a Polish surname. Notable people with the surname include:

- Antonio Chłapowski (born 1943), Polish-Swedish sportsperson
- Dezydery Chłapowski (1788–1879), Polish general, businessman and political activist
