= Bolesław Wysłouch =

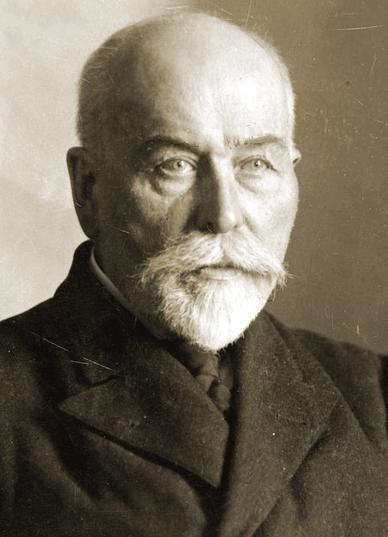
- Born: 22 November 1855; Zaluzh'ye, Russia
- Died: 13 September 1937 (aged 81); L'viv, Poland
- Occupations: Chemist, political activist

Bolesław Wysłouch (Polish pronunciation: [bɔˈlɛswaf ˈvɨswɔwx]; 22 November 1855 – 13 September 1937) was a Polish nobleman, peasant advocate, a socialist, a senator and co-establisher of the original Polish Peasants Party.

Wysłouch was born in Polesia, in Socha, a village in the Grodno Governorate of the Russian Empire (present-day Belarus). He completed his education with a degree in chemical engineering at the Emperor's Petersburg Institute of Technology in Saint Petersburg. He became active in politics as a student, mainly through university societies. From 1881 he was affiliated with Lud Polski, a left-wing newspaper run by Bolesław Limanowski (as a result of which he was imprisoned in the Warsaw Citadel for three years).

In 1885 Wysłouch moved to Lviv, where together with his wife Maria he ran a monthly newspaper, Przegląd Społeczny until it was stopped by the Austrian officials in 1887. He then created Przyjaciel Ludu (People's Friend), a new left-wing newspaper which became popular with activists for peasant rights and which became the centre of the popular movement in the Austrian partition.

In 1894 Wysłouch created the Polish Democratic Society, and a year later he co-founded the People's Party (which since 1903 has been known as the Polish People's Party) in Galicia. He became a member of the party's Head Council, but in 1912 he left in order to establish a new entity called "PSL Union of the independent popular activists". The following year he moved to the Polish People's Party "Piast", where he stayed until 1923, after which he moved to the Polish People's Party "Wyzwolenie" with which he was involved until 1925. From then he was a member of the Labour Club until his political retirement in 1927. During the years 1922-1927 he served as a senator of the Second Polish Republic.

He was married to Maria Wysłouch, a political activist from Galicia. After her death in 1905 he married Bronisława Wysłouchowa, which later became a colonel in the Polish Armed Forces in the West as well as an inspector of the Women's Auxiliary Service.

He died in Lviv on 13 September 1937 and is buried at the Lychakiv Cemetery.

== Bibliography ==
- Brock, "Boleslaw Wyslouch: Founder of the Polish Peasant Party." Slavonic and East European Review, xxx (74), 1951.
- Mazurek, Kraj a emigracja. Instytut Studiów Iberyjskich i Iberoamerykańskich, Warsaw, 2006.
- Kudłaszyk, Wysłouch, Myśl społeczno-polityczna Bolesława Wysłoucha: 1855-1937. Wrocław, 1978.
- Encyklopedia PWN, 2007.

== See also ==
- Wysłouch family
