= Historia narodu polskiego =

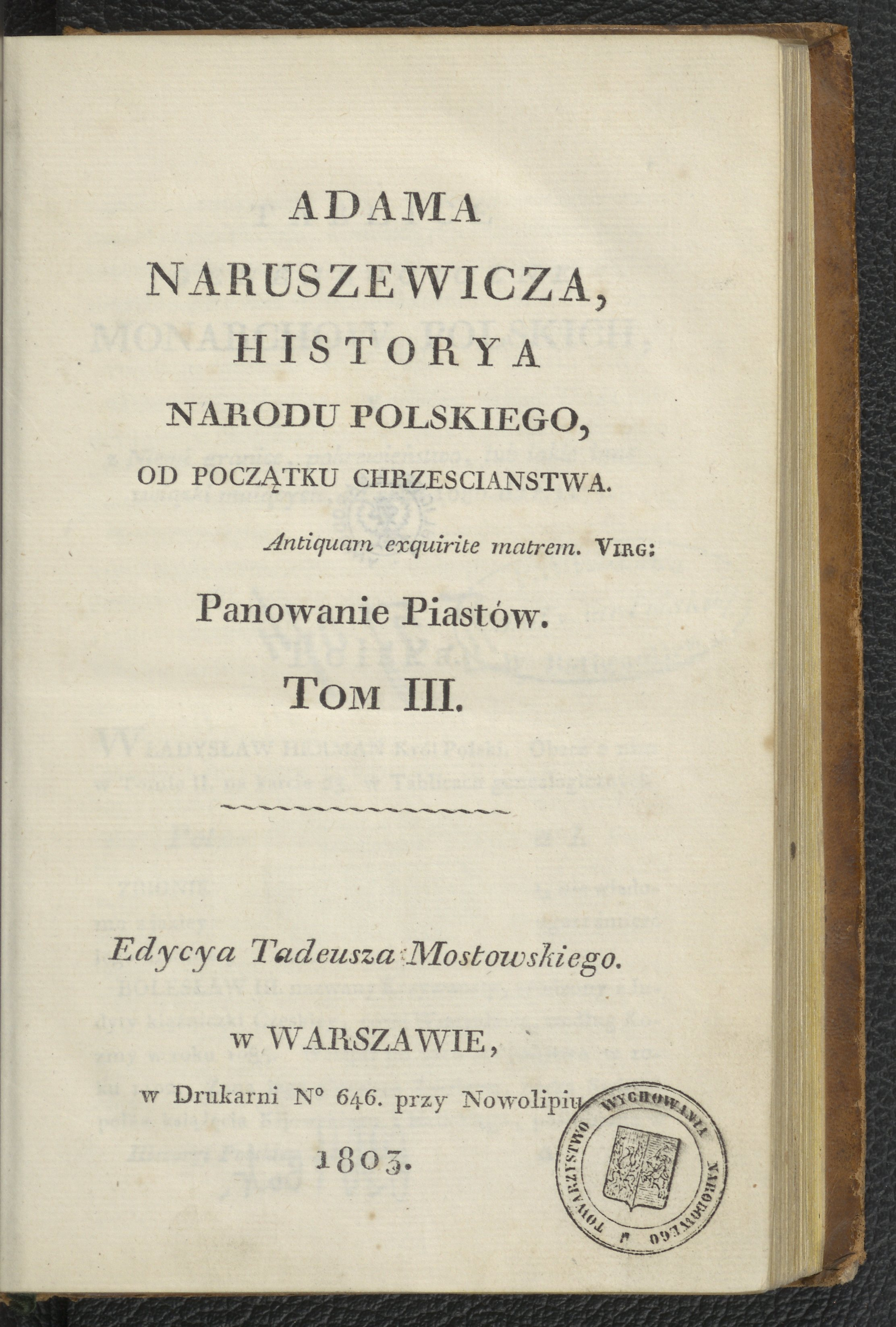
Cover page of the 1803 edition of volume III of his History of the Polish Nation

Historia narodu polskiego (History of the Polish Nation) is a multi-volume historical work by Polish-Lithuanian bishop Adam Naruszewicz, considered the first modern, scholarly history of Poland, and a highly influential work on the early Polish historiography. It also represented the viewpoints of monarchism and the King of Poland, Stanislaus Augustus, in the intense political debates of the second half of the 18th century Poland.

Mostly written in the years 1776–1779 during the era of Polish Enlightenment and published in the subsequent decades, this ambitious project, inspired by the works of Voltaire, was unfinished, as Naruszewicz only completed the volumes covering the times up to the end of the Piast dynasty in the 14th century.

== Background ==
The idea of writing a modern history of Poland came from Naruszewicz's patron, Stanislaus Augustus Poniatowski, King of Poland. Following the First Partition of Poland in 1772, Poniatowski attempted to reform the ailing Polish-Lithuanian Commonwealth, a task opposed by vested interests both among the Polish nobility and the Commonwealth's neighbours. In 1775, Michał Wielhorski, one of Poniatowski's opponents, had published the treatise On returning the former government according to the original Republican laws (O przywróceniu dawnego rządu według pierwiastkowych Rzeczypospolitej ustaw), which relied on historical evidence to attack the king’s policies. Poniatowski desired to reply in kind, aiming to show that, literally, history was on his side, and so he chose Naruszewicz, his close retainer and primary advisor on history, for that task.

Naruszewicz had few predecessors to guide him. The only prior attempt to write a history of Poland was the work of the 15th century chronicler Jan Długosz, while the latter historians of the Renaissance simply rewrote past works, often simply retelling the chronicles of Długosz. Naruszewicz, a man of The Enlightenment, concurred the prior work was obsolete and inadequate, and instead was inspired by history works of his contemporaries, such as Voltaire. The goal of the work became, in the words of historian John D. Stanley, "to underline the important role that history played in the Polish Enlightenment.", showing how past history can provide solutions to current problems. In 1776 the King would award him an Order of Saint Stanislaus for his efforts.

== Development ==
In his "Memorial regarding the writing of a national history" (Memoriał względem pisania historii narodowej) penned in 1775, Naruszewicz outlined the project, stressing the novel importance of relying on archival materials, as well as on the need to collect and organize them. For several years, Naruszewicz would devote much of his time to the project. While he had a number of assistants, including the King himself, Naruszewicz was the sole author, having given himself the goal of writing at least 500 words a day and dedicating much of his daily routine (from 8:30 a.m to 3:00 p.m) to this project. Initially he worked in the village of Powieć, later moving back to Warsaw upon the King's request. Naruszewicz spent over two years gathering materials, and begun primary writing around 1777, finishing the draft of the first seven volumes by 1779. By that time, however, Naruszewicz would come to find the work onerous. He would complain of the lack of materials for the latter periods, but also, would become increasingly involved in the politics of the Commonwealth, including the works of the Great Sejm that begun later that decade. The series, therefore, remained unfinished, as Naruszewicz only covered period up to the end of the Piast dynasty in 1386, with Volume I covering the prehistoric era and volumes II-VII, the Piast era. He would nonetheless continue compiling and organizing historical documents until his death, and his archive became known as known as Teki Naruszewicza (Naruszewicz's Folders). Although unpublished during his life, they later became a valuable archive to future historians, containing well organized documents, including copies of now-lost texts.

The volumes begun to be published annually from 1780 onward, in an edition of 1,500 copies; however, publication of the Volume I was significantly delayed and it was published only in 1824.

== Contents ==
Following the Enlightenment's best practices in writing on history, Naruszewicz introduced periodization of history, based on Poland's dynastical history: the prehistorical era the Piast dynasty, the Jagiellonian dynasty, and the period if the elective monarchy that he divided into two periods, the first ending with the abdication of Jan II Kazimierz, and the last, continuing to his present era. The books were also divided in volumes and chapters based on the classic model of Tacitus. His work follows a strict chronological layout, with chapters corresponding reigns, and subchapters, to years (beginning with 962), although a number of topics such as the monetary system, the Jews, or steam baths received lengthy footnotes.

Firmly on the side of Poniatowski, Naruszewicz's work would also strongly advocate the cause for strong monarchy, while heavily criticizing the nobility in general and the szlachta's privileges, including the Golden Liberty and free election, in particular. He criticized serfdom, but did not call for any major reforms, believing that mistreatment of the citizens reflects weak monarchy, and that the cure lies in strengthening the royal power and curbing the excesses of the nobility. Despite being a Roman Catholic bishop, in most matters he also sided with the king instead of Papacy, and following the Enlightenment's secularist trend, he refused to explain history as the outcome of divine mandate or intervention. He was critical of the Protestants and the Orthodox, but that was due to seeing religious diversity as weakening the state. Supportive of the Polish cause on the international scene, Naruszewicz justified Polish claims to disputed territory, and was very critical of German politics concerning Poland, but favorable towards German cultural influence. Naruszewicz also acknowledged that the Slavs were not the original inhabitants of the lands they inhabited in the second millennia. Departing from the ideal of the noble savage, Naruszewicz regarded the ancient era as a period of savage barbarism. He rejected a number of legends such as the Lech, Czech, and Rus and Krakus as fairy tales, although acknowledged some of them may be based on kernels of truth. He did, however, accept the legend of the Sarmatian origin of the Polish nobility.

Naruszewicz periodization and focus on the state, and seeing the history of Poland as a history of the Polish state – its kings, foreign affairs, wars, and treaties – would be both influential and disputed by subsequent Polish historians. In Polish historiography, there is a distinction between the "Naruszewicz school", supporting monarchy and strong central power and stressing the centrality of the state for the understanding of the Polish history, and the more liberal-republican "Lelewel school".

== Reception and significance ==
Naruszewicz has been praised for his methodology - reliance on primary sources and fact-checking. His work often reproduces shorter primary sources in their entirety, and discusses where they differ in case of contradictions. He often left the questions open to the readers to draw their own conclusions. Historia... has been described as the first scholarly treatment of Polish history.
