= Wysłouch =

Polish-Lithuanian noble family

Odyniec, the family coat of arms.

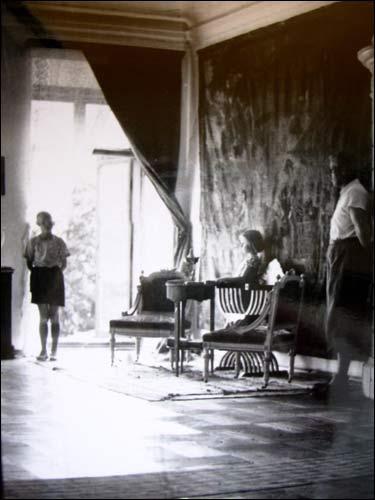
Pirkowicze, 1938.

Wysłouch (Wisłouch, Visłavuch and others) is a Polish-Lithuanian noble family. It traces its lineage back to 1385 when, along with other major Lithuanian noble clans, its forebears were admitted to the ranks of Polish nobility. The line begins with Stanisław Kościa, a Polish knight born in 1390; however, the first mention of the Wysłouch family name was recorded in a document dating from the first half of the 16th century. The Wysłouch family uses the "Odyniec" coat of arms.

== Political involvement ==
The family produced a number of politicians and public activists. In the 16th century, a number of Wysłouchs held important public offices, including a Royal Castellany, and at the end of the 18th century Zenon Kazimierz Wysłouch was one of the members of the Great Sejm, the Polish Parliament which created the Constitution of May 3, 1791. Bolesław and Antoni Izydor Wysłouch were prominent liberal politicians and members of the Parliament in the inter-war period, the former being a co-founder of the PPS "Piast" party.

== Independence movement ==
Members of the Wysłouch family were involved in the independence movement during the Partitions of Poland. At the end of the 18th century, Emmanuel Wysłouch was an officer serving in the Polish Legions during Napoleon's campaign in Italy. In the 19th century, Antoni Wysłouch and his wife, Teofila, took an active part in the January Uprising; they were close friends with the uprising leader, Romuald Traugutt, and Eliza Orzeszkowa, a well-known positivist writer.

The family owned the estates of Pirkowicze, Sacha, Leżajka and others, most of which are currently abandoned or ruined. The exception is Pirkowicze house, now in Belarus, which serves as a local school.

== Notable members ==
- Zenon Kazimierz Wysłouch (1727–1805), a member of the Great Sejm and a co-author of the Polish Constitution of May 3, 1791, the second oldest constitution in the world.
- Emmanuel Wysłouch (1757–1798), an officer in the Polish Legions affiliated with Napoleon, who died in the battle of Terracina.
- Bolesław Wysłouch (1855–1937), a Polish socialist senator and co-founder of the Polish People's Party "Piast".
- Antoni Izydor Wysłouch (1864–1940), a member of the Polish parliament in the 1930s and a historian.
- Seweryna Wysłouch (from the house of Bończa-Skarżyńscy) (1869–1918), a writer, poet and painter. Best known for a series of academic works on Polish literature and of sketches depicting Polish national heroes.
- Seweryn Wysłouch (1900–1968), an influential historian and legal academic, head of the School of Law and Administration at the University of Wrocław from 1956 to 1958.
- Karol Wisłouch (1897 - 19??), a lieutenant of the 14th Jazłowiecki Ulhans Regiment, decorated with the Virtuti Militari order for his achievements in the Polish–Soviet War of 1918-1920.
- Stanisław Wisłouch (1875–1929) a hydrobiologist, responsible for the modernization of the water filters in Warsaw.
- Stanislav Michaelovic Wisłouch (1875-1927), a botanist who was honoured in the plant genus Wislouchia
- Franciszek Wysłouch (1896-1978) a colonel, painter, and writer, a Siberian exile under the tsar, veteran of the Polish-Bolshevik War, the Second World War, and an emigre in London.
- Zygmunt Wisłouch ("Zarewicz") (? - 2005), an officer in the Warsaw Uprising of 1944, decorated with the Virtuti Militari order.
