= Jazłowiec College =

Former Roman Catholic girls school in Poland

- Zakład Naukowo-Wychowawczy Sióstr Niepokalanek w Jazłowcu
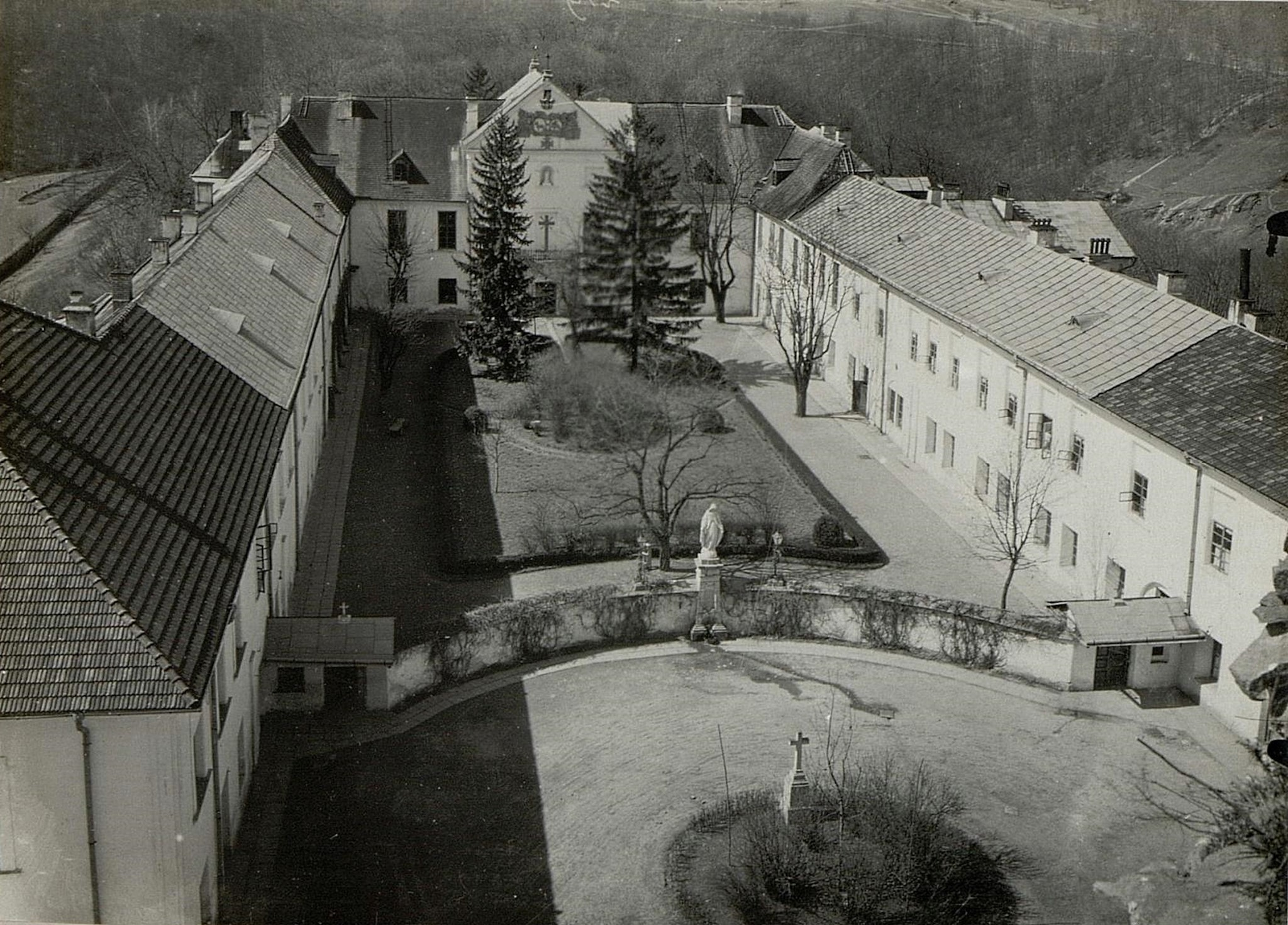
- Aerial view of Jazłowiec college in 1910
- Other names: Комплекс споруд Язловецької єзуїтської колегії
- Type: Roman Catholic boarding school for girls
- Active: 1863–1939
- Religious affiliation: Roman Catholic
- Location: Yazlovets, Buchach Raion, Ternopil Oblast, formerly Galicia (Eastern Europe) in Austria-Hungary, then Poland, now Ukraine
- Patron saint: Blessed Virgin Mary of the Immaculate Conception

Jazłowiec (Ukrainian: Язловець, romanized: Yazlovets) was a Polish language Catholic lyceum founded in 1863 by the Congregation of the Sisters of the Immaculate Conception of the Blessed Virgin Mary ("Niepokalanki" in Polish), expressly for the education of girls and young women. It took its name from its location at the time, Jazłowiec, on the Olchowiec (Ukrainian: Vilchivchik) river, a tributary of the Strypa, 16 km south of Buchach, Tarnopol Voivodeship, Galicia, now in Ukraine. During its 80-year existence it acquired great prestige for an institution of its kind and led to the order's educational expansion across land which is now Poland, Belarus and Ukraine.

== History ==
In 1862, Krzysztof Błażowski, latest of the Jazłowiec estate owners, decided to donate his classical Poniatowski palace to a charitable cause. In 1863 he placed it and the estate in the hands of the Polish noblewoman, widow and mystic, Marcelina Darowska, for the establishment of a convent for her new religious order, the Congregation of the Sisters of the Immaculate Conception of the Blessed Virgin Mary, and for a girls secondary school and other educational provision among the local rural population. Although the palace was in a dilapidated state, it offered 62 rooms and had internal running water. There were a spacious ballroom to convert into a chapel and extensive grounds and this pleased Darowska. She set to work with her team to rehabilitate the estate in time to welcome the first intake of pupils. The roll would eventually reach 120. The Sisters swiftly established the boarding school in Jazłowiec itself, for the children of wealthy families, which was attended by Darowska's own daughter, Karolina. A network of rural elementary schools was also set up.

=== Curriculum ===
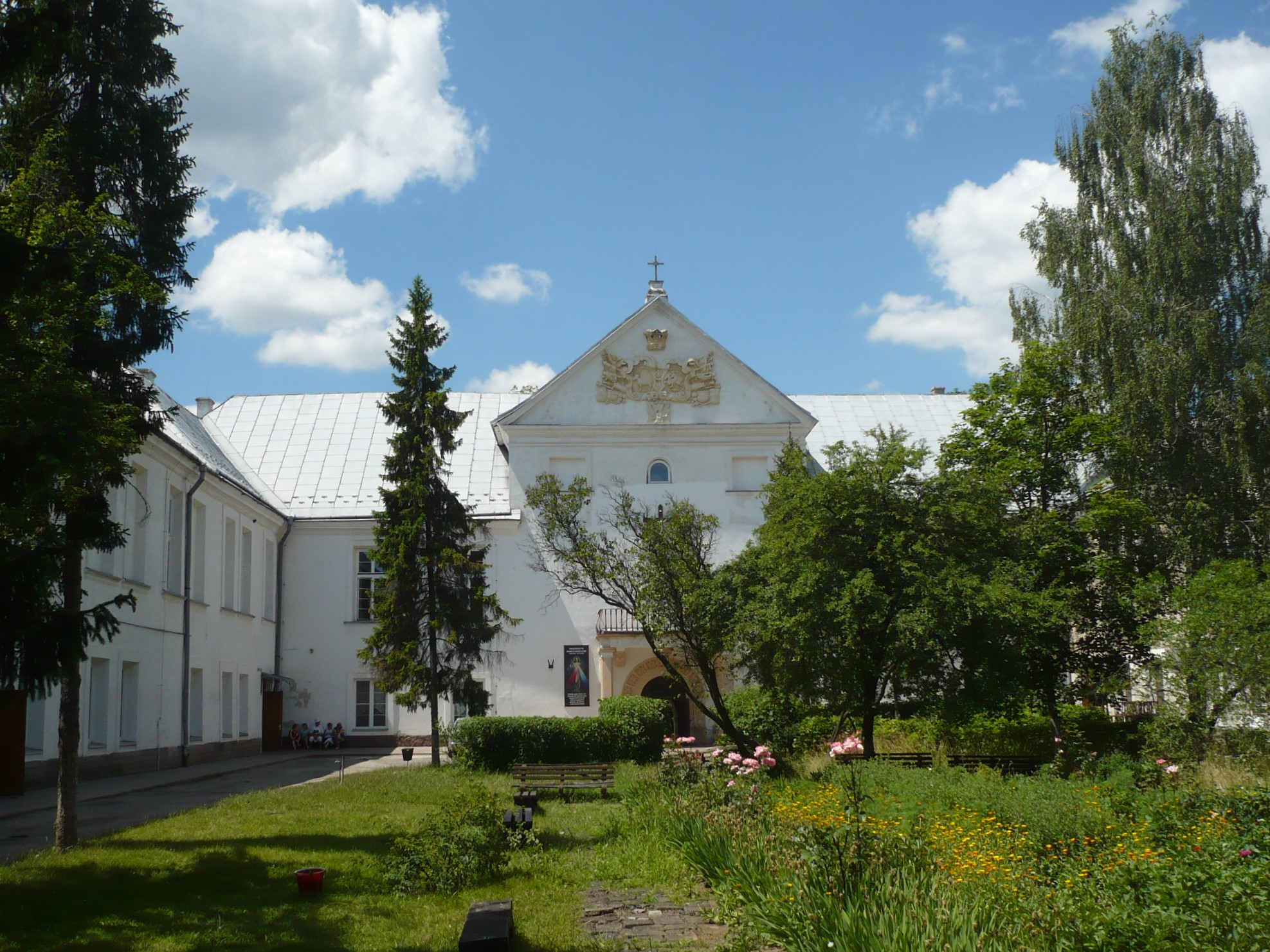
Jazłowiec former convent school courtyard

Darowska's avowed aim in founding a community of sisters dedicated to education was to improve the place of women in society. The school pioneered a range of subjects for girls, from Polish and foreign languages and literature, through history and geography to mathematics and science subjects. Other topics included music and art, PE, religious instruction and civics in light of the partitioned nature of Poland as a political entity. There was a particular accent, before 1918, on patriotism and catholicism as a counterweight to the threat presented to Polish heritage and identity in all three of the adjacent powers occupying the erstwhile state, Austria-Hungary, Prussia and the Russian Empire, where germanisation and russification were dominant. Although not all the pupils, especially those local to the school, came from wealthy or intellectual circles, the majority did. The school proved so popular with families, that in 1873 the construction of another project began in Jarosław on the river San at the foot of the Carpathian Mountains. Others were to follow, beyond the "Mother house".

=== School network ===
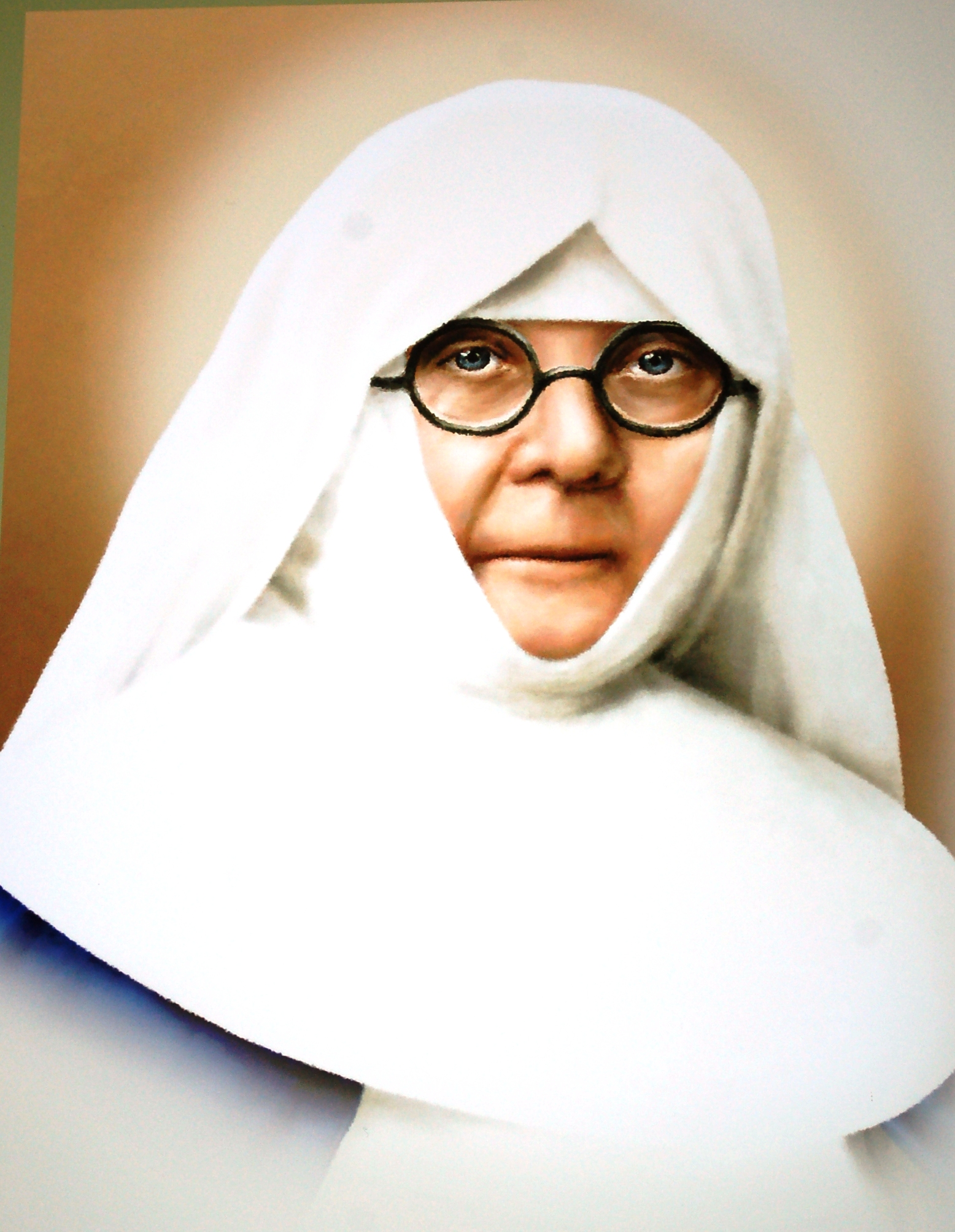
Marcelina Darowska

- Secondary school in Jarosław
- Słonim in Lithuania, shut down in 1939
- Niżniów nr. present day Ivano-Frankivsk, shut down in 1939
- Primary school in Warsaw
- Boarding lyceum in Szymanów. After 1945 it became the "Mother House".
- Boarding lyceum in Wałbrzych
- Boarding middle school in Nowy Sącz
- Boarding Technical school in Nowy Sącz

The convent in Słonim in Lithuania in the Russian Partition was in an environment of acute repression such that the sisters had to work in secret for the first 11 years. After 50 years of activity as superior of the congregation, at her death on 5 January 1911 in Jazłowiec, Darowska left seven convents and a community of 350 sisters. In recent years the last three schools of the order have become co-educational, with boarding facilities confined to female pupils.

== Notable associated people ==
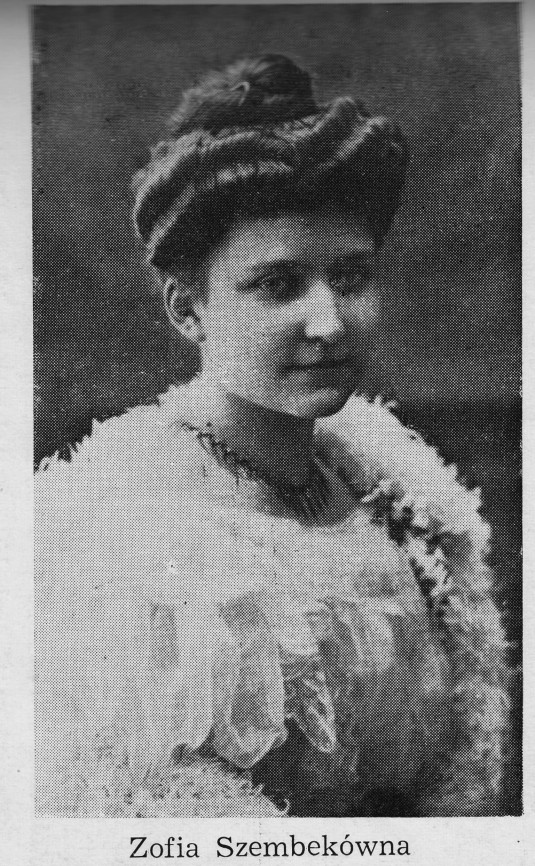
Zofia Szembekówna

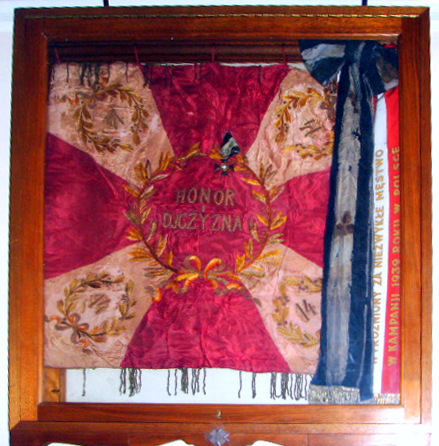
Standard of the 14th Jazlowiec Uhlan Regiment, Polish Institute and Sikorski Museum, London

- Blessed Marcelina Darowska, foundress
- Celina Michałowska, daughter of Piotr Michałowski, painter, writer, nun, art teacher and translator
- Maria Rodziewiczówna, alumna and Polish writer
- Marcella Sembrich, alumna, Polish opera singer
- Adam Stefan Sapieha, chaplain to the school
- Zofia Szembekówna, archaeologist, ethnographer, lecturer, nun, superior in Jazłowiec
- Anna Turowiczowa, alumna and literary translator
- Blessed Bogumiła Noiszewska, medical doctor, nun, teacher and protector of Jews in WWII
- Zofia Stefania Ustyanowicz, nun in Jazłowiec, protector of Jews in WWII
- Laetitia Maria Szembek, nun, superior in Jazłowiec during WWII
- Krystyna Skarbek, alumna, SOE operative and secret agent in WWII
- 14th Jazlowiec Uhlan Regiment, commanded by Brigadier General Konstanty Plisowski successfully defended the convent, College and the entire area during the Polish–Ukrainian War in 1919. They attributed their success to the intercession of the Lady of Jazłowiec and chose to make her the Patron saint of the regiment and added Jazłowiec to the regimental name and kept it thereafter right through World War II. As a token of their gratitude to the officers and men, in 1921 former students of the College devised a special regimental standard which they brought with them to the United Kingdom after the war. It is kept in the collection of the Polish Institute and Sikorski Museum in London.

== See also ==
- Jesuit College in Khyriv
