= Maciej Grabowski (nobleman) =

Polish noble

Personal details
- Died: 1750

Maciej Grabowski (died 1750) was a Polish-Lithuanian nobleman and politician, Treasurer of the Crown Court from 1738. He became an archivist in the Crown Treasury in 1710. He became famous for his skillful administration and was envoy to many Diets. In 1742 he was Treasurer of the Great Crown. At the Diet of 1744 he made a report on the state treasury. He overlooked the renovation of Royal Wawel Castle.
