= Collegium Regium (Warsaw) =

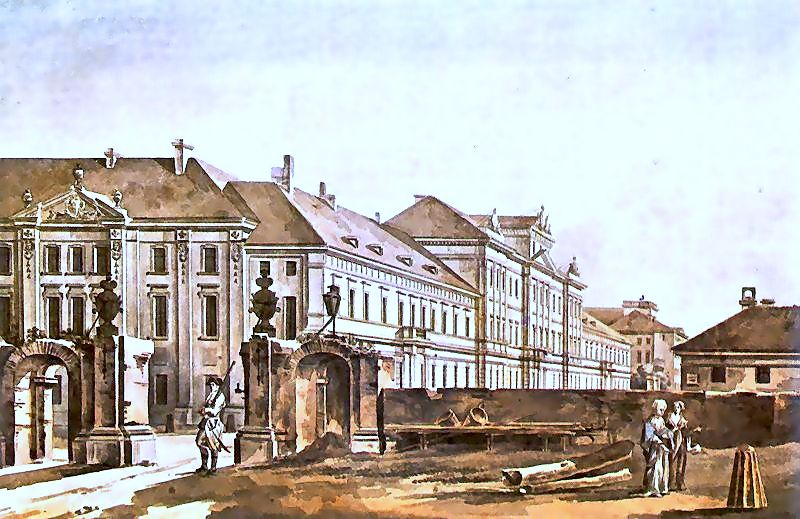
- Collegium Regium (left) adjoining Collegium Nobilium, depicted by Zygmunt Vogel, c. 1786

Location
- Długa Street; Warsaw; Poland; 52°14′56.8″N 21°00′25.5″E

Information
- Other name: Collegium Vetus
- School type: Free secondary school
- Religious affiliation: Roman Catholic (Piarists)
- Established: 1652
- Founder: Władysław IV Vasa
- Closed: 1833
- Administrator: Piarist order

Collegium Regium (transl. Royal College), also known as Collegium Vetus (transl. Old College), was a secondary school run by the Piarists in Warsaw from the mid-17th century until 1833. It was one of the city's oldest secondary schools. Its premises stood on Długa Street, near its junction with Miodowa Street.

The school was founded with the support of King Władysław IV Vasa. It initially operated under several names, including Collegium Principale and the Warsaw Piarist Schools. After the establishment of the separate Collegium Nobilium in 1740, the older institution was also known as Collegium Vetus. The name Collegium Regium became widespread during the reign of Stanisław August Poniatowski.

The Piarists lost control of the school following the November Uprising. The college buildings were destroyed during World War II, and their burnt-out walls were demolished in 1948. In 1950–1951, a new building designed by Leon Marek Suzin was erected on the site of the former school, with façades reflecting its historical appearance. It was intended to house the General Deanery of the Polish Armed Forces.

== History ==
Present-day buildings on the site of Collegium Regium

The Piarists arrived in Warsaw in 1642 at the invitation of Władysław IV. The king purchased a property for them on Długa Street, where a wooden church dedicated to Saints Primus and Felician and a building housing a monastery and school were erected. The school opened in 1652, with the Italian Piarist Józef Marci as its first rector. Following the destruction caused by the Swedish invasion, it reopened in 1657.

In 1657, the Piarists received permission to run the school from Wojciech Tolibowski, Bishop of Poznań. In 1667, the Sejm approved the operation of Piarist schools and placed them under the protection of the Polish–Lithuanian Commonwealth. King John III Sobieski confirmed their privileges and endowments in 1683. Construction of masonry school buildings began in the second half of the 17th century. Work on the building on Długa Street started in 1687; according to architectural historian Ryszard Mączyński, it was already in use by 1697. In 1679, the provincial superior Michał Kraus established a theological institute at the Warsaw Piarist complex. It trained members of the order for teaching and operated until 1834.

In 1729, the Piarists began using the name Collegium Principale in connection with their rivalry with the Warsaw Jesuits over the provision of education. An extension of the school building on Długa Street was completed in 1733. Additional wings, including the so-called House of the Priest-Professors, were built in the 1730s. The building works were overseen by the architect Józef Fontana. The importance of the Warsaw Piarist establishment increased under Stanisław Konarski, who became rector of the Warsaw Piarist schools in 1739. The following year, he founded Collegium Nobilium, intended primarily for the sons of magnates and wealthy nobles. Unlike the new elite institution, Collegium Regium remained a free school open to the public.

Konarski's educational reforms also affected other Piarist schools. In 1750, he obtained permission from Pope Benedict XIV to reform the order, and reforms of Piarist education were implemented between 1753 and 1756. From 1758 to 1780, the Warsaw Piarist complex also housed Collegium Civile, intended for the sons of townspeople. Collegium Regium, Collegium Nobilium and Collegium Civile were separate educational institutions, each with its own library.

Following the establishment of the Duchy of Warsaw, the college operated as the Piarist Departmental School from 1807 to 1815. Under Congress Poland, it became the Piarist Voivodeship School. After the defeat of the November Uprising, the Russian authorities closed the school on 16 November 1831. Teaching resumed a few days later, however, on a reduced scale, in a four-grade school that remained under Piarist administration. In 1833, as part of the state's takeover of schools run by religious orders, the Piarists lost control of the institution. It was converted into a state district school and subsequently operated at several locations in Warsaw, including Freta Street. Its successor later occupied premises on Podwale and Gęsia streets. In 1866, it was converted into a Realgymnasium, from which the later Warsaw Real School developed.

== Organisation and teaching ==
Collegium Regium was a free school open to the public and run by the Piarist order. It was headed by a rector, whose responsibilities were primarily organisational and administrative. Before the educational reforms of the 18th century, the full course of study lasted eight years and comprised seven classes. The two lowest classes were completed within a single year, while each of the two highest lasted two years. Subjects included Latin, rhetoric and mathematics. The writings of Jędrzej Kitowicz, who described the school's customs and the organisation of its lessons, provide information about the Warsaw Piarist school in the 18th century. According to his account, mathematics lessons took place several times a week.

== Library ==
Collegium Regium had its own library, which was among Warsaw's significant school collections. Its holdings have been estimated at approximately 11,089 volumes. The library had both manuscript and printed catalogues. Catalogues were compiled in 1705, 1759, 1796 and 1822, among other years. The last two also listed more than a dozen incunabula. The collection grew through purchases and donations. In 1761, the college purchased a three-volume copy of Antoninus Pierozzi's Chronicon, published in Basel in 1491, for 24 tymfs. The copy had belonged to Józef Andrzej Załuski.

Following the closure of the Piarist schools in 1833, the collections of Collegium Regium, Collegium Nobilium and Collegium Civile were combined and moved to a former Jesuit building on Jezuicka Street in 1834. In 1869, they were transferred to the Seminary Library in Warsaw. According to research by Martyna Osuch, approximately 3,500–4,000 volumes from the Warsaw Piarist libraries survive in the library of the Higher Metropolitan Seminary in Warsaw, many of them originating from Collegium Regium and Collegium Nobilium.

== Bibliography ==
- Konarski, Kazimierz (1923). Dzieje szkolnictwa w b. Królestwie Kongresowym 1831–1867 (in Polish). Kraków.
- Mączyński, Ryszard (1998). "Warszawskie biblioteki księży pijarów". Rocznik Historii Sztuki (in Polish). 23: 91–139.
- Mączyński, Ryszard (2009). Zespoły architektoniczne Collegium Regium i Collegium Nobilium warszawskich pijarów 1642–1834 (in Polish). Warsaw.
- Osuch, Martyna (2024). "Pozyskiwanie inkunabułów przez biblioteki klasztorne w XVIII-wiecznej Warszawie na przykładzie sześciu druków popijarskich i pomisjonarskich pochodzących ze zbiorów Józefa Andrzeja Załuskiego". Archiwa, Biblioteki i Muzea Kościelne (in Polish). 123. doi:10.31743/abmk.16155.
- Królikowski, Lech (2016-03-30). "Chwała Collegium Regium". Passa (in Polish).
