= Antonio Chłapowski =

Polish sportsperson

Antonio/Antoni Chłapowski (born December 31, 1943, in Lwów, Poland) is a sportsperson.

He is a descendant of Dezydery Chłapowski. Chłapowski has both Polish and Swedish citizenship.

== Formula Ford career ==
Chłapowski's was the first sport was Formula Ford. He won the Danish championship, and came second in the Swedish championship and the championship of the Benelux countries. Antonio also qualified to second place in the final of the 1972 World Championships.

=== Some of the Swedish competition results in Formula Ford ===
Competition	Type	Date	Plac	Snr	Vehicle	Class	Bst SPEED	End time
SSK-Final Anderstorp 1976	Startlist	1976-10-10	0	11	Lotus	Formel Ford 1600cc
SSK-Final Anderstorp 1976	Race	1976-10-10	5	11	Lotus	Formel Ford 1600cc		11:43.1
SSK Kinnekulle 1976	Startlist	1976-09-26	0	11	Lotus	Formel Ford 1600cc
SSK Kinnekulle 1976	Race	1976-09-26	18	11	Lotus	Formel Ford 1600cc		11:01
SSK Karlskoga 1976	Startlist	1976-09-12	0	11	Lotus	Formel Ford 1600cc
SSK Karlskoga 1976	Race	1976-09-12	1	11	Lotus 61	Formel Ford 1600cc		13:44.4
SSK Karlskoga 1976	Startlist	1976-08-01	0	11	Lotus 61	Formel Ford 1600cc
SSK Karlskoga 1976	Race	1976-08-01	6	11	Lotus 61	Formel Ford 1600cc		23:03.1
SSK Kinnekulle 1976 + SM	Startlist	1976-06-20	0	11	Lotus 61	Formel Ford 1600cc
SSK Kinnekulle 1976 + SM	Race	1976-06-20	4	11	Lotus 61	Formel Ford 1600cc		10:30.1
SSK Falkenberg 1976	Startlist	1976-05-30	0	11	Lotus 61	Formel Ford 1600cc
SSK Falkenberg 1976	Race	1976-05-30	5	11	Lotus 61	Formel Ford 1600cc		08:24.6
SSK Anderstorp 1976	Startlist	1976-05-09	0	11	Lotus 61	Formel Ford 1600cc
SSK Anderstorp 1976	Race	1976-05-09	4	11	Lotus 61	Formel Ford 1600cc		11:27.4
SSK Mantorp 1976	Startlist	1976-04-18	0	11	Lotus 61	Formel Ford 1600cc
SSK Mantorp 1976	Race	1976-04-18	5	11	Lotus 61	Formel Ford 1600cc		10:54.7
Ring Knutstorps SM-Lopp 1974	Startlist	1974-04-28	0	23	Lotus 61	Formel Ford 1600cc

Competition	Type	Date	Plac	Snr	Vehicle	Class	Bst SPEED	End time
Mantorps SM-Lopp 1975	Race	1975-05-11	7		Lotus 61	Formel Ford 1600cc
Ring Knutstorps SM-Lopp 1975	Startlist	1975-04-27	0	11	Lotus 61	Formel Ford 1600cc
Ring Knutstorps SM-Lopp 1975	Race	1975-04-27	6	11	Lotus 61	Formel Ford 1600cc
Mantorps SM-Final 1974	Race	1974-09-15	4	0	Lotus 61	Formel Ford 1600cc		21:16.1
Västkustloppet 1974	Startlist	1974-07-14	0	23	Lotus 61	Formel Ford 1600cc
Kinnekulle Ring, SM-Final 1973	Startlist	1973-09-08	0	11	Lotus 61	Formel Ford 1600cc
Kinnekulle Ring, SM-Final 1973	Kval 1	1973-09-08	15	11	Lotus 61	Formel Ford 1600cc	01:01.6
Anderstorps Vårlopp 1973	sammanslaget	1973-05-06	4	20	Brabham	Formel Ford 1600cc		39:12.6
Anderstorps Vårlopp 1973	Heat 2	1973-05-06	4	20	Brabham	Formel Ford 1600cc		20:19.1
Anderstorps Vårlopp 1973	Heat 1	1973-05-06	8	20	Brabham	Formel Ford 1600cc		18:53.5
Mantorps Höstlopp 1972	Startlist	1972-09-03	0	5	Merlyn Mk 20A	Formel Ford 1600cc
Mantorps Höstlopp 1972	Race	1972-09-03	7	5	Merlyn Mk 20A	Formel Ford 1600cc		20:54.9
Kinnekulle Rings SM-Lopp 1972	Startlist	1972-08-20	0	1	Merlyn Mk 20A	Formel Ford 1600cc
Kinnekulle Rings SM-Lopp 1972	Race	1972-08-20	8	1	Merlyn Mk 20A	Formel Ford 1600cc		12:16.7
Shell F3 Championship, Anderstorp 1972	Startlist	1972-06-18	0	5	Merlyn Mk 20A	Formel Ford 1600cc
Shell F3 Championship, Anderstorp 1972	sammanslaget	1972-06-18	3	5	Merlyn Mk 20A	Formel Ford 1600cc	01:45.4	21:42.4
Dalsland Rings Vårlopp 1972	Startlist	1972-05-28	0	29	Merlyn Mk 20A	Formel Ford 1600cc
Dalsland Rings Vårlopp 1972	Heat 1	1972-05-28	2	29	Merlyn Mk 20A	Formel Ford 1600cc		06:32.1
Dalsland Rings Vårlopp 1972	Final	1972-05-28	4	29	Merlyn Mk 20A	Formel Ford 1600cc		12:51.1
Dalsland Rings SM-Final 1971	Startlist	1971-09-19	0	5	Hawke DL 2A	Formel Ford 1600cc
Dalsland Rings SM-Final 1971	afinal	1971-09-19	9	5	Hawke DL 2A	Formel Ford 1600cc		13:02.1
Anderstorps SM-Lopp 1971	Startlist	1971-05-09	0	19	Hawke DL 2A	Formel Ford 1600cc
Anderstorps SM-Lopp 1971	Race	1971-05-09	5	19	Hawke DL 2A	Formel Ford 1600cc		18:35.9
Anderstorps Höstlopp 1970	Startlist	1970-09-12	0	16	Hawke	Formel Ford 1600cc
Mantorps F2-Trophy 1970	Startlist	1970-08-30	0	12	Hawke	Formel Ford 1600cc
Nord-Jämt Loppet 1970	Startlist	1970-07-26	0	91	Hawke	Formel Ford 1600cc
Anderstorps F5000-Race 1970	Startlist	1970-06-28	0	47	Hawke	Formel Ford 1600cc
Anderstorps F5000-Race 1970	Race	1970-06-28	28	47	Hawke	Formel Ford 1600cc	01:55.4	27:37.5
Anderstorps F5000-Race 1970	Kval 1	1970-06-28	35	47	Hawke	Formel Ford 1600cc	01:55.6
Anderstorps Sportvagns-EM 1970	Startlist	1970-06-06	0	20	Hawke	Formel Ford 1600cc

== Equestrian career ==
Eventually Chłapowski gave up his auto racing career to move to horses. Upon Chłapowski's graduation from the renowned Swedish education for Riding instructors at Strömsholm he received the highest instructor level, RIK III.

Chłapowski continued his sports career as a member of the Swedish equestrian team. For many years he competed against and trained with riders like Jan Mathausen, Thomas and Markus Fuchs, Wilhelm Melliger, Stanny van Paesschen and Helen and Peter Weinberg. Chłapowski is now an outstanding coach and also a professional farrier. Chłapowskis dream is to make riding to the Polish national sport.

== Company in Poland ==
1995 bought Chłapowski a decaying state-owned farm in Jaszkowo and founded the Centrum Hipiki. It has since the takeover renovated and built the Centre Hipiki Jaszkowo and continues so. Already in 2004, was Centrum Hipiki Jaszkowo classified by the FEI as one of the largest education and competition center in Europe for horses, ponies and riders, as well as one of Europe's biggest pony center. Antonio is strong devotee task of educating children, adolescents and adults in all aspects of riding to do.

Centrum Hipiki has twice hosted the European Pony Championship, at Jaszkowo, south of the city of Poznań.
