= Collegium Nobilium (Warsaw) =

Secondary school in Warsaw

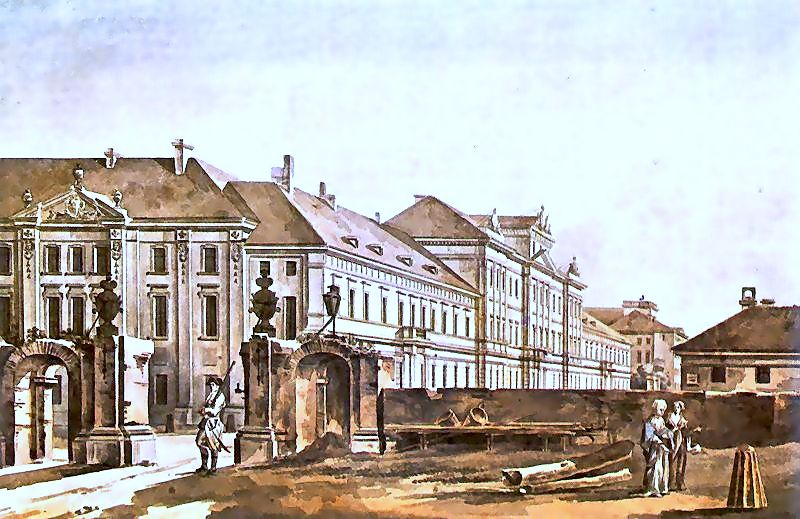
- View of the Piarist convent, Zygmunt Vogel, circa 1786. On the left, the front façade of the Collegium Regium is visible, adjoined by the long Classical façade of the Collegium Nobilium
- Warsaw; Poland

Information
- Type: Elite boarding school
- Established: 1740

The Collegium Nobilium (English: College for Nobles) or Collegium Novum (English: The New College) was an elite boarding school for the sons of Polish magnates and wealthy nobles (szlachta), founded in 1740 in Warsaw by the Piarist intellectual, Stanisław Konarski, and run by his religious brethren. Collegium Nobilium in Warsaw was the finest, model institution of Piarist education in the Polish–Lithuanian Commonwealth with the highly qualified teaching staff and serving as an elite educational establishment. Piarist schools for nobles modeled after it were later founded in Lviv and Vilnius.

Initially, it existed at the older Piarist school, founded in 1657 and called the Collegium Regium, housed in a monumental building on Miodowa Street. In 1807, when the building was occupied by the military, the school was relocated outside the city to the Piarist grounds in Żoliborz, from which time it became known as the Żoliborz Boarding School (Polish: Konwikt Żoliborski).

It is often confused with another college foundation in Warsaw of the same name, only founded by the Jesuits in 1752 and serving the same demographic. That one was forced to close as a result of the suppression of the Society of Jesus in Western Europe in 1777.

== History ==
The Piarists were brought to Warsaw by King Władysław IV in 1642. In 1657, they opened their first school on Długa Street, known as the Collegium Regium or the Royal College. In 1679, the Piarists established a Theological Institute next to it, which trained priests for teaching work. After the opening of the Collegium Nobilium, also called Collegium Novum, the old school began to be referred to as Collegium Vetus, the Old College. The new school differed from the old one in that it was intended exclusively for the children of the nobility, introduced tuition fees paid by the students (80 red złotys per year), and received state subsidies. The establishment of the new institution was also connected with a general reform of Piarist education, carried out from 1740 by its founder, Stanisław Konarski, and approved by Pope Benedict XIV in 1754. A continuation of the reform was the opening of a school for townspeople in Warsaw, the Collegium Civile, in 1758.

Piarist schools were similar to Jesuit ones, copying their 7-class system, but the main difference lay in the greater freedom of teaching, which resulted from the absence of a fixed school statute, as well as from departing from the exclusive use of Latin in instruction. Piarist schools introduced the native language as the medium of teaching and sought to instill in their students a sense of patriotism and concern for the affairs of the state. Discipline was also less strict, and teachers maintained a closer relationship with their pupils. Collegium Nobilium was modeled on the first elite institution founded in 1630 by Joseph Calasanz, the Collegium Nazarenum in Rome. In Piarist colleges, alongside traditional education, great emphasis was placed on physical training and the cultivation of knightly skills such as dancing, fencing, and horseback riding.

By founding an elite school, Konarski entered into competition with the already existing Collegium Varsaviense of the Theatines, established in 1732 and held in high esteem. Soon after, in 1752, the Jesuits also founded their own Collegium Nobilium in Warsaw. Thus, at that time, three elite schools coexisted in the city.

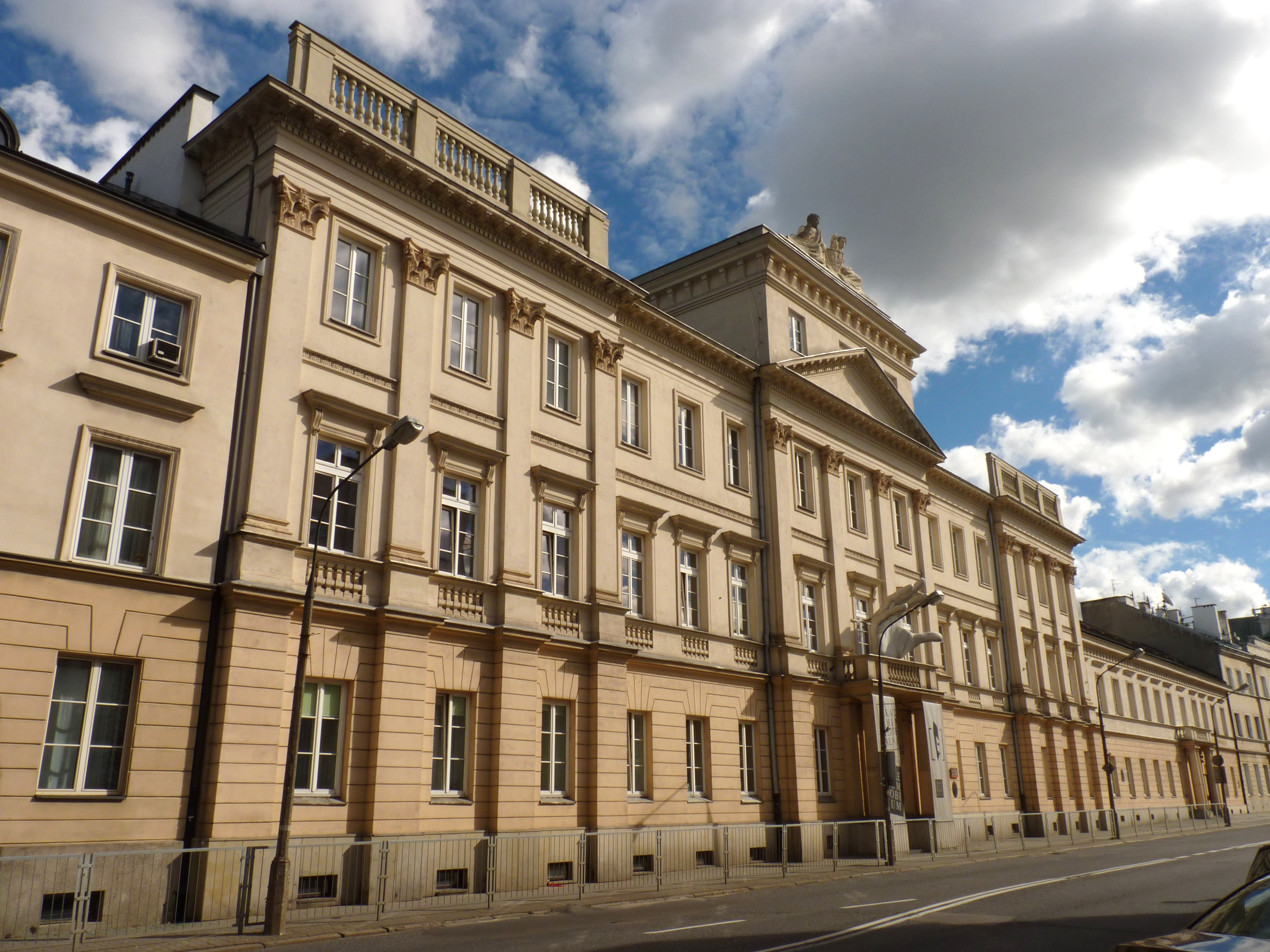
Building of the Collegium Nobilium on Miodowa Street (2013)

The Collegium Nobilium building was constructed between 1743 and 1754 on a plot adjacent to the old college, on the Miodowa Street, according to a design by Jakub Fontana. It was a spacious building with a distinct three-story central block and two two-story wings. Due to a lack of funds, the completion of the façade, executed in the Classical style rather than the originally planned Baroque, did not take place until 1783–1785, on the initiative of Rector Michał Stadnicki, following a design by Stanisław Zawadzki. The construction of the school building was made possible thanks to the support of donors, primarily King Stanisław August Poniatowski, the Voivode of Sandomierz Jan Tarło, and Hetman Jan Klemens Branicki. The Collegium Nobilium building was almost completely destroyed during the Warsaw Uprising. It was rebuilt after the war, together with its classical façade.

In 1757, the Piarist order received in perpetual lease a plot located outside the city, north of Warsaw, from the Melchior Szymanowski, intended for a house and recreational grounds for the youth studying at the college. In 1784 the terrain became the full property of Piarists. On these grounds, soon called Joli Bord in French (English: Beautiful Embankment), later Polonized to Żoliborz (hence the name of today’s district), the order also established its economic facilities, including a river port, to which goods from their estates located upstream on the Vistula were transported. The Piarist estates in Żoliborz were gradually expanded. After 1773, they were made available to the Jesuits as the seat of their Collegium Nobilium, following a fire.

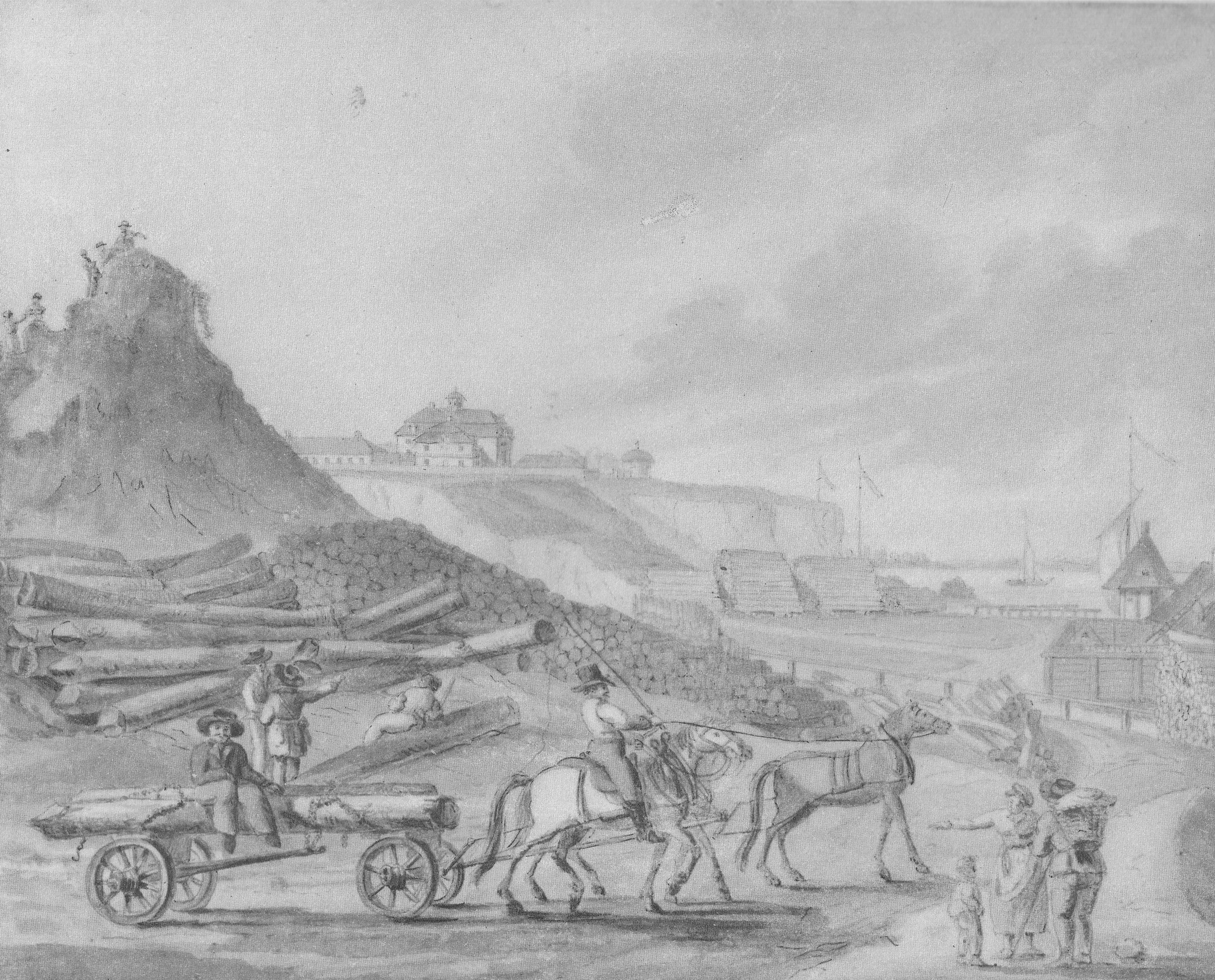
View of Żoliborz by Aleksander Majerski, 1818. On the slope, the buildings of the Collegium Nobilium are visible.

In 1807, Napoleonic troops occupied the main building on Miodowa Street as a military hospital, forcing the college to relocate to Żoliborz. The ruined building on Miodowa was sold to the government of the Duchy of Warsaw in 1811 for use as the School of Artillery and Engineers. Financial difficulties, mainly caused by the government’s delay in paying the owed funds, meant that the expansion of the seminary continued until 1822; during this period, new residential buildings, chapels, and an astronomical observatory were constructed. At its peak, the Collegium educated over one hundred students. The November Uprising brought an end to its existence, as students, teachers, and the order itself actively participated. The Piarists were expelled from Żoliborz, and their estates were confiscated without compensation in 1832. An attempt to revive the school in a rented house on Zakroczymska Street by Rector Jakub Ciastowski proved futile, as in 1833 the government ordered the closure of all schools run by the Catholic clergy. Soon afterward, construction of the Warsaw Citadel began on the grounds of the Żoliborz.

=== List of rectors ===
- Augustyn Orłowski (1740-1759, 1760-1768)
- Antoni Wiśniewski (1759–1760)
- Michał Stadnicki
- Józef Strzelecki (1771–1780)
- Kajetan Kamieński (1801–1822)
- Jakub Ciastowski (1826–1833)

=== Notable alumni ===
- Tadeusz Rejtan
- Roman Ignacy Potocki
- Stanisław Kostka Potocki
- Zenon Kazimierz Wysłouch

== See also ==
- Szkoła Rycerska
- Jazłowiec College

== Bibliography ==
- Mączyński, Ryszard (1994a). "Fasada pijarskiego gmachu Collegium Nobilium w Warszawie". Ochrona Zabytków. 185.
- Mączyński, Ryszard (1994b). "Żoliborski Konwikt Pijarów". Analecta. 5.
- Puchowski, Kazimierz (2019). "Pijarskie Collegium Nobilium w Wilnie. Korzenie i konteksty". Aštuonioliktojo amžiaus studijos. 5.
- Sobolewska Strzelczak, Beata (2013). "Początki szkolnictwa pijarskiego. Inspiracje dla współczesnej teorii i praktyki pedagogicznej". Perspectiva. 23.
