= Medal Merentibus =

Medal Merentibus (literally translated from Latin as medal "for the deserving") is a historic medal which was established in 1766 by Stanisław August Poniatowski, King of Poland and Grand Duke of Lithuania. Following its establishment, it was awarded in the Polish–Lithuanian Commonwealth for outstanding merits in science, arts, inventions, and industry until 1795.

== Design ==
The medal was designed by medalist Johann Philip Holzhaeusser. On the obverse is depicted a face in profile of Stanisław August Poniatowski and surrounding it is a Latin inscription with his names and monarchial titles: STANISLAUS AUGUSTUS DG REX POLONIAE M D LITUA (literally translated as Stanisław August by the Grace of God King of Poland and Grand Duke of Lithuania). Meanwhile on the reverse at the top of the medal is a Latin inscription MERENTIBUS ("for the deserving") and below it are decorative floral motifs. The medal has golden and silver variants. The golden variant weight is ~45 grams.
