= Grigoryev =

Grigoryev (Russian: Григорьев; Ukrainian: Ґригор'єв; masculine) or Grigoryeva (Russian: Григорьева; feminine) is a Russian surname. It is derived from the Latinized Greek name Gregory (Grigorios). Alternative spellings of this last name include Grigoriev (masculine) and Grigorieva (feminine). Notable people with the name include:

- Afanasy Grigoriev (1782–1868), Russian architect
- Alexander Grigoriev (disambiguation)
- Andrey Aleksandrovich Grigoryev, (1883–1968) Russian geographer
- Apollon Grigoryev (1822–1864), Russian poet, literary critic, and translator
- Artem Grigoriev, Russian figure skater
- Boris Grigoriev (1886–1939), Russian painter and graphic artist
- Dima Grigoriev (born 1954), Russian mathematician
- Dmitry Grigoryev (born 1975), Kazakh businessman
- Ellina Grigorieva, Russian-American mathematician
- Kate Grigorieva (born 1988), Russian fashion model and former Victoria's Secret Angel
- Lidiya Grigoryeva (born 1974), Russian long-distance runner
- Maksim Grigoryev (disambiguation), several people
- Mikhail Grigoryev (born 1991), Russian professional ice hockey player
- Nataliya Grygoryeva (hurdler) (born 1962), Russian runner and hurdler
- Nataliya Grigoryeva (rower) (born 1965), Russian rower
- Nikifor Grigoriev (1885–1919), military leader in Ukraine during the Russian Civil War
- Nikolai Grigoriev (dissident) (1822–1886), member of the Petrashevsky Circle of dissidents in the Russian Empire
- Nikolay Grigoriev (1895–1938), Russian chess player and endgame study composer
- Oksana Grigorieva (born 1970), Russian musician
- Oleg Grigoriev (1943–1992), Russian poet
- Pyotr Grigoryev (1899–1942), Soviet association football player
- Semyon Grigoryev (born 1960), Soviet and Russian diplomat
- Sergey Grigoryev (pole vaulter) (born 1992), Kazakhstani athlete
- Sergey Grigoryev (race walker) (born 1937), Soviet athlete
- Tatiana Grigorieva (born 1975), Russian/Australian pole vaulter
- Tatiana P. Grigorieva (1929–2014), Russian Japanologist
- Vassili Grigorjev (1870–?), Russian-Estonian politician
- Yury Grigoriev (born 1969), Russian politician
