= Johann Georg Pinsel =

Baroque-Rococo sculptor

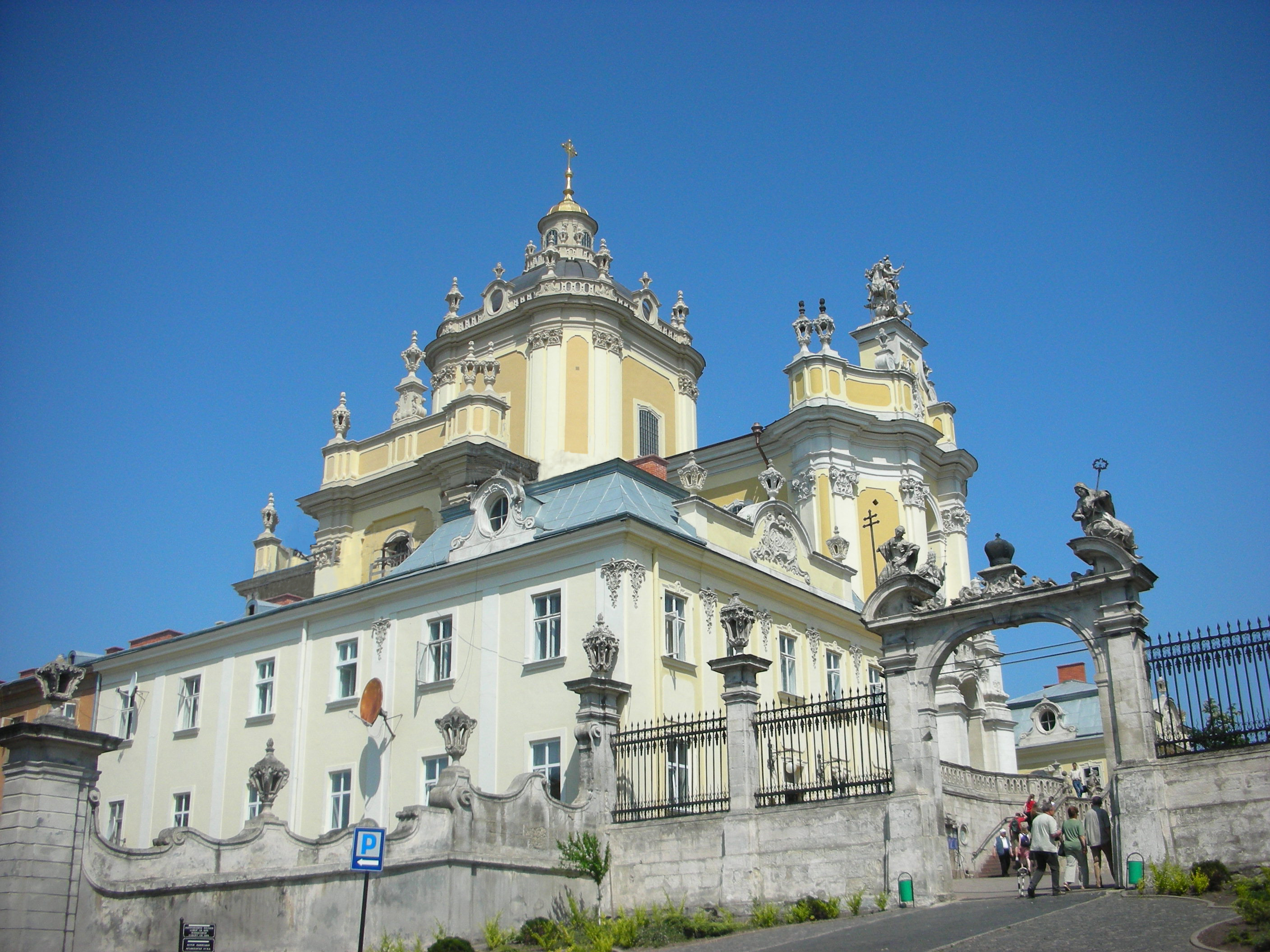
Cathedral of Saint George in Lviv

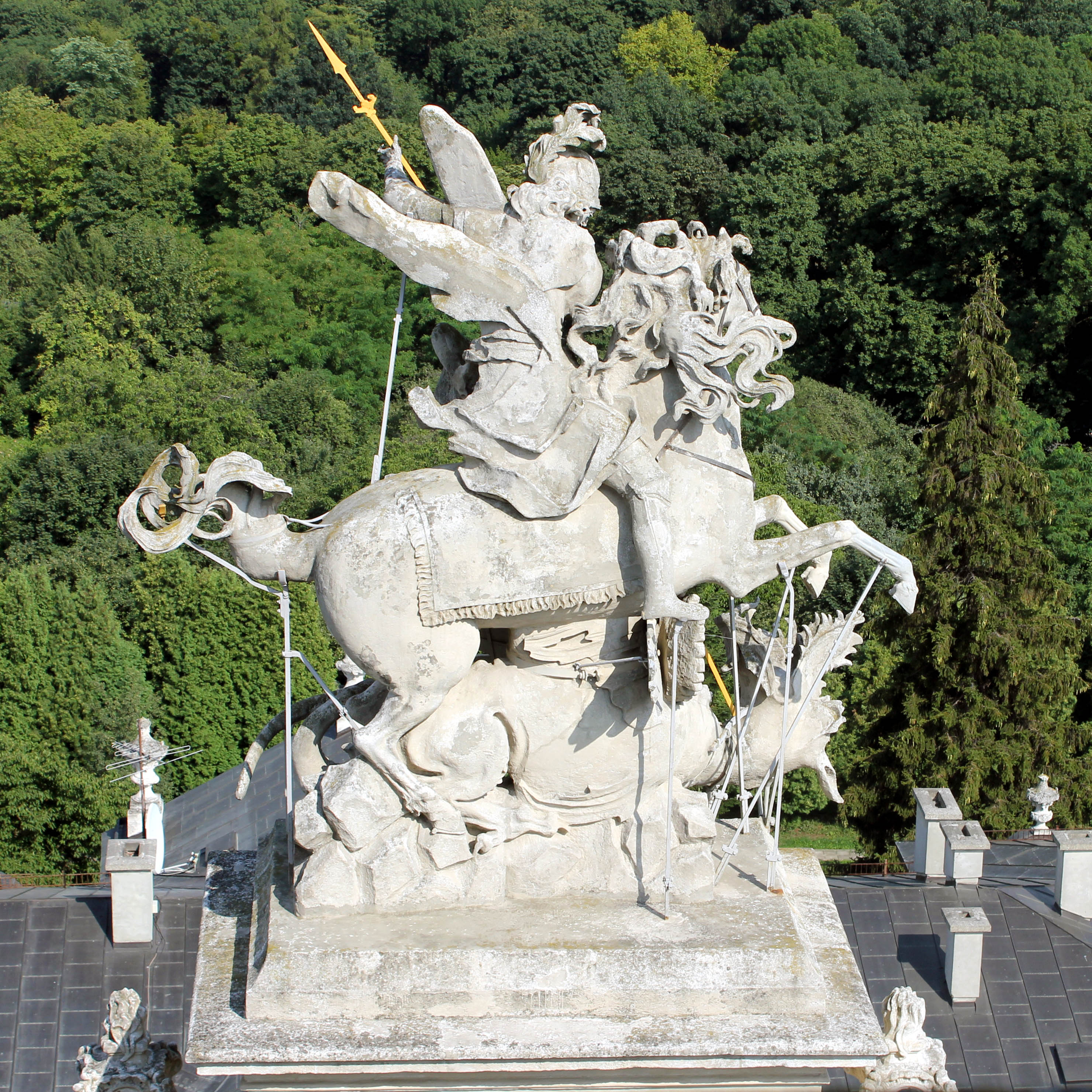
Statue of Saint George

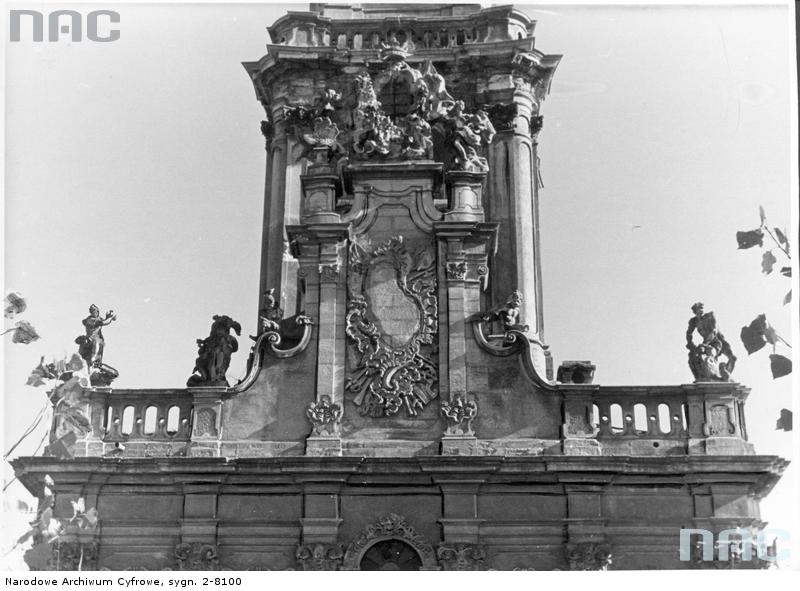
Townhall in Buchach

Johann Georg Pinsel (Polish: Johann Georg / Jan Jerzy Pinsel, Ukrainian: Йоган Ґеорґ Пінзель; 1707–1710 – 1761 or 1762) was a Baroque-Rococo sculptor active in Eastern Galicia (then in the Polish–Lithuanian Commonwealth, now in Ukraine).

== Biography ==
Biographical details about him are scarce. He was discovered by Jan Bołoz Antoniewicz and appeared in scholarly literature in 1923 in the monograph of p. Władysław Żyła "Kościół i klasztor Dominikanów we Lwowie" ("Dominican church and monastery in Lviv"). There is lack of information about the date and place of Pinsel's birth, and little is known about his private life. His first and second name, some facts about his family, and more precise year of death were determined only in 1993, with the discovery of registers of the Buchach Roman Catholic parish.

Pinsel came to the Kingdom of Poland most probably in the mid-18th century. According to Jan K. Ostrowski, he was almost certainly of German ethnic origin, although his native region is not yet established. He settled in Buchach and started to work as a sculptor under the patronage of the rich Polish aristocrat Mikołaj Bazyli Potocki. On 13 May 1751, he married Marianna Elżbieta née Majewska, the widow of Jan Kieyt. He had two sons with her: Bernard and Antoni. He closely collaborated with Bernard Meretyn. His student was Maciej Polejowski.

He died between 16 September 1761 and 24 October 1762, probably in Buchach.

Pinsel's works include sculptures and decorations of the Buchach Town Hall (1750s), the Trinitarian church (1756–1757) and the St. George's Cathedral (headquarters of Greek Catholics) in Lviv, (1759–1761), interiors of the Roman Catholic churches in: Monastyryska (1761), Horodenka (1752–1755) and Hodovytsia (1757–1758), sculptures in the Roman Catholic parish church in Budaniv.

Almost all of his sculptural complexes have been damaged or destroyed. In particular, little is left from his sculptures in the Roman Catholic churches in Horodenka and Monastyryska. His only work that remains intact in its original form, including the intended spatial arrangement, is the facade of the St. George's Cathedral. Employees of the Lviv Art Gallery preserved all Pinsel's figures from the high altar in Hodovytsia.

== Selected works ==
- Stone monumental sculpture of St. John of Nepomuk (preserved heads, 1750) and Virgin Mary (1751) in Buchach
- Stone sculpture for parapet Buchach Town Hall (initially 14 survived)
- The altar of the Church of the Immaculate Conception in Horodenka (18 sculptures, rescued 5)
- Column with a statue of the Virgin Mary in Horodenka
- The interior of churches in Ustia Zelene (now Chortkiv Raion) and Hvizdets
- Saint Onuphrius (Saint Onuphrius church, Rukomysh)
