= Dmitry Grigoryev =

Dmitry Grigoryev may refer to

- Dmitry Grigoryev (businessman) (born 1975), Kazakh businessman
- Dmitry Grigoryev (swimmer) (born 1992), Russian Paralympic swimmer
