= Alexander Grigoriev =

Alexander Grigoriev may refer to:

- Alexander Grigoriev (bellfounder) (c. 1634 – after 1676), Russian cannon and bellmaker
- Alexander Grigoryev (1949–2008), Russian security services official
- Aleksandr Grigoryev (athlete) (born 1955), Russian high jumper
- Alexander Grigoriev (artist) (1891–1961), Mari Soviet artist, public figure and academician
- Alexander Grigoriev, lyricist for "Try to Find Me" (1990) by Gorky Park
- Alexander Grigoryev, a character in The Two Captains by Veniamin Kaverin

== See also ==
- Grigoryev
