= Church of the Assumption, Monastyryska =

Ukrainian church in Monastyryska, Ukraine

Church of the Assumption
- Церква Успіння Пресвятої Богородиці
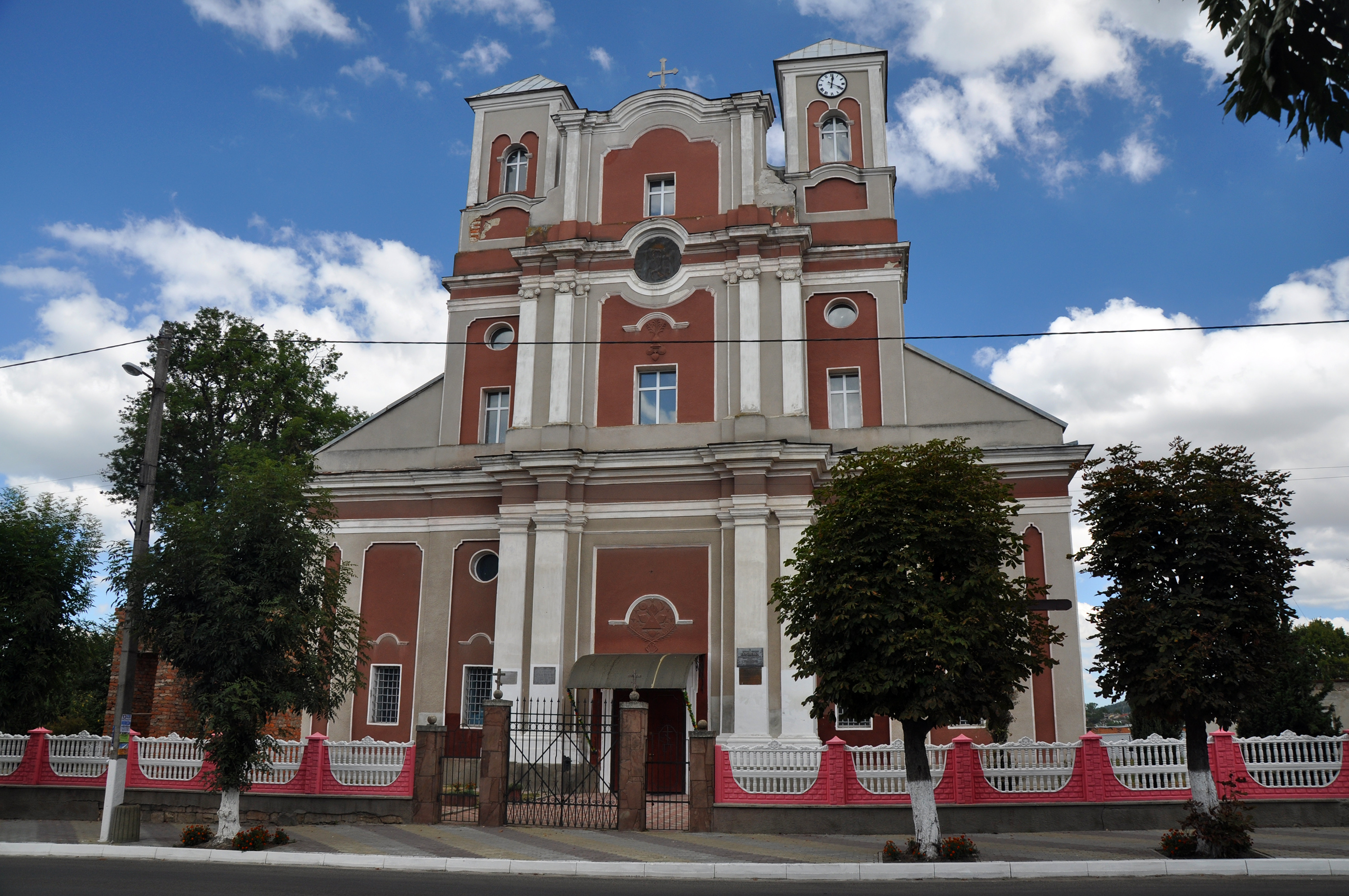

- Location within Ternopil Oblast

Location
- Location: Monastyryska
- Interactive map of Church of the Assumption
- Coordinates: 49°05′29.6″N 25°10′15.0″E

Architecture
- Completed: 17th c.

Church of the Assumption of the Blessed Virgin Mary (Ukrainian: Церква Успіння Пресвятої Богородиці) is a former historic Roman Catholic church in Monastyryska, Ternopil Oblast, and an architectural monument of local importance. The most impressive of the city's churches, it was a parish church of the Ukrainian Autocephalous Orthodox Church until December 2018, and is now a church of the Orthodox Church of Ukraine.

== History ==
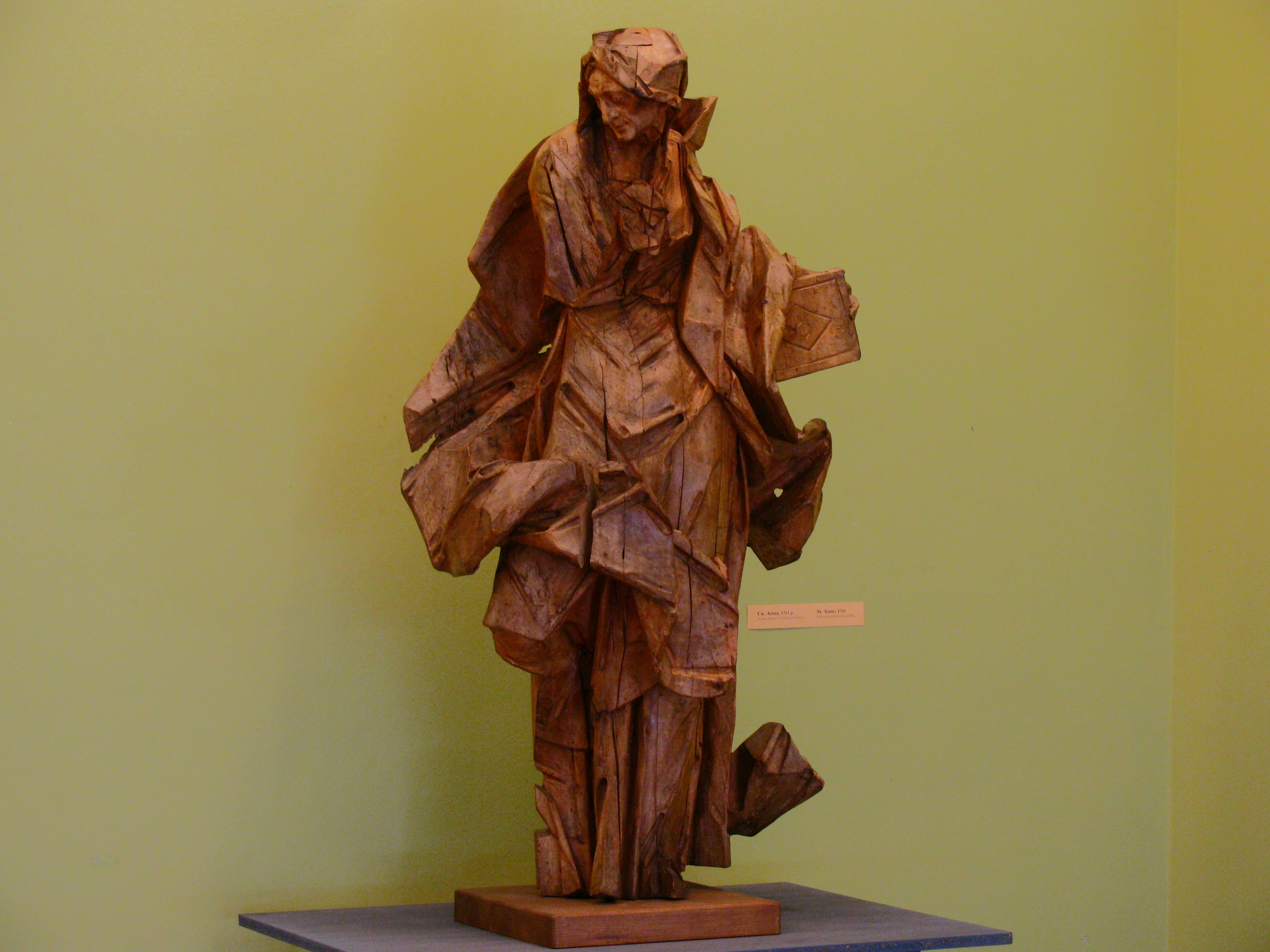
Statue of Saint Anne

The brick Roman Catholic church dedicated to the Assumption of the Blessed Virgin Mary was built in the mid-18th century on the site of an earlier wooden church. The church was founded by Józef Potocki, the heir to the town and castellan of Lviv (or Bazyli Potocki).

Consecrated on 29 September 1751, by Michał Kunicki, suffragan bishop of Kraków.

The structure of the main altar in the church was built before 1754.

In 1761, funds left by priest Franciszek Kielarski were used to pay Johann Georg Pinsel for his work on the altars and Antoni Sztyl for his paintings.

The spatial layout of the building is derived from the architecture of Francesco Borromini.

Zbigniew Hornung believed that Antoni Osiński was the author of the figures in the main altar. Jan K. Ostrowski, on the other hand, believes that the figures in the main altar of the church have nothing to do with Antoni Osiński's works in the churches in Zbarazh and Leżajsk, which are documented in sources.

According to Piotr Krasny and Jakub Sita, architect Bernard Meretyn was the author of the design for the main altar in the church, and this design may have been the source of inspiration for the main altar in the Franciscan church in Przemyśl.

Before the Soviet devastation, there were three altars in the church: the main altar (Assumption of the Blessed Virgin Mary), St. Rosalia (at the western end of the side aisle), and the Virgin Mary of Sorrows (at the eastern end of the side aisle).

For some time, there was a commemorative plaque in the church wall in honor of Zygmunt Krasiński.

The facility was closed by the Soviet authorities on 30 November 1945 and converted into a warehouse.

Despite requests from Roman Catholics, the facility was handed over to the Orthodox Church.

== Bibliography ==
- Zbigniew Hornung. Na marginesie ostatnich badań nad rzeźba lwowską XVIII wieku. „Buletyn Historii Sztuki”. VII, s. 131–149, 1939. [dostęp 2017-01-31]
- Jan K. Ostrowski: Kościół parafialny p.w. Wniebowzięcia Najświętszej Panny Marii w Monasterzyskach. [W:] Materiały do dziejów sztuki sakralnej na ziemiach wschodnich dawnej Rzeczypospolitej. Cz. I : Kościoły i klasztory rzymskokatolickie dawnego województwa ruskiego. T. 4. Kraków: Międzynarodowe Centrum Kultury, Drukarnia narodowa, 1996, 211 s., 402 il., ss. 84–94. ISBN 83-85739-34-3.
- Zbigniew Żyromski. Jubileusz pobytu Matki Boskiej Bolesnej z Monasterzysk w Bogdanowicach. „Głos Buczaczan”. 4 (47), Wrocław, 2003, s. 5–8.
- "Monasterzyska". Geographical Dictionary of the Kingdom of Poland (in Polish). 6. Warszawa: Kasa im. Józefa Mianowskiego. 1885. p. 658.
