= Motorin family =

Russian family of bellfounders

The Motorins, also spelled Matorins (Моторины, Маторины in Russian) were a famous Russian family of bellfounders.

== Feodor Dmitriyevich Motorin ==
Feodor Dmitriyevich Motorin (Фёдор Дмитриевич Моторин) (1630s–1688) began his career at the Moscow Cannon Yard in 1651 along with another famous bellmaker Alexander Grigoriev. In the 1670s, Motorin became a leading caster at the Cannon yard. In 1678, he cast a bell for the Church of Simeon Stolpnik in the Povarskaya Sloboda, in 1681 – for the Church of Virgin Mary in Grebnevo, in 1682 – for Danilov Monastery, in 1684 – for the Church of Archangel Gabriel at Chistiy Prud. All these bells, however, were destroyed by the Soviets in the 1930s. Feodor Motorin was also a talented businessman. After having accumulated some financial capital, he began purchasing land and buildings for his colleagues-bellmakers in the Pushkarskaya Sloboda in the 1660s. This is how the first bellmaking factory came into being in the area of Sretenskiye Gates in Moscow, of which Motorin had been the owner since 1686. The factory used to cast bells, commissioned by churches and monasteries. Small bells were also made for sale in Moscow.

A few works autographed by Feodor Motorin have survived to this day. They include two bells cast in 1678 and 1679 – the Danilov Bell (Даниловский колокол) and the New Bell (Новый колокол) weighing 3.2 tons (both can still be seen in the middle tier of the Ivan the Great Bell Tower); an 8-ton bell, cast for the Novodevichy Convent (1684); a 1.6-ton bell for the Volynsky Monastery in Chernigov (1683), which was relocated to Moscow in 1991 and hung on the Saint Basil's Cathedral. All of the surviving bells made by Motorin are known for their casting purity and rich relief decorations (stylized arabesque ornament and images of cherubs and seraphs, which harmonize with cast inscriptions).

== Dmitry Feodorovich Motorin ==
Dmitry Feodorovich Motorin (Дмитрий Фёдорович Моторин) (? – ?) was the son of Feodor Motorin. In 1682–1696, he worked at the Moscow Cannon Yard as a bellmaker. Dmitry Motorin is known for his unusual 64 kg bell, cast by him in 1687 at the request of a boyar Vasily Golitsyn for the Church of Pokrova Bogoroditsy in his votchina of the village Medvedkovo (it can be seen in Kolomenskoye today). The top part of the bell is made in the form of a bellringer's head, crowned by lion heads and ornaments.

== Ivan Feodorovich Motorin ==
Ivan Feodorovich Motorin (Иван Фёдорович Моторин) (1660s – 19 August 1735) was the son of Feodor Motorin. His factory used to produce bells for many Moscow monasteries and churches. In 1692, he cast a 1-tonne bell for the Church of John the Apostle in Bronniki (moved to the Saint Basil's Cathedral). In 1695, Ivan Motorin made a 3-tonne bell for the Church of Saint Nicholas in Moscow (destroyed in the 1930s).

In February 1701, after heavy artillery losses in the Battle of Narva, Peter the Great ordered to use Motorin's bellmaking factory for cannon production. A famous cannon maker Martyan Osipov (Мартьян Осипов) assisted Ivan Motorin in mastering the science of cannon-making. Motorin's factory carried out the order in a short period of time and produced 113 copper cannons by February 1702. On 26 November 1702, Ivan Motorin was ordered to cast a 54-ton bell for the Ivan the Great Bell Tower, which would be called Воскресенский (Resurrection Bell). In 1704, he made a 13.3-ton bell nicknamed Великопостный (Lent Bell). In 1712, Motorin's factory burnt down and was rebuilt only two years later. In 1714, Ivan Motorin cast the 2-ton Alarm Bell (Набатный колокол), which was later placed on top of the Tsarskaya Tower of the Moscow Kremlin. It remained there until 1771 and was then moved to the Armoury in 1821. In the 1710 and 1720s, Motorin made a few bells for the Muscovite churches and monasteries, including Chudov Monastery. Most of these bells did not survive to this day. In 1730, he cast a 7-ton Novgorod Bell (Новгородский колокол), which can still be seen in the lower tier of the Ivan the Great Bell Tower. In 1731, Motorin was ordered to turn the damaged bells (due to a fire of 1723) of the Church of Archangel Gabriel into clock bells for the Troitskaya Tower of the Moscow Kremlin. Their fate, however, is still unknown.

Famous Tsar bell (Царь-колокол) was Motorin's masterpiece, for which he is best remembered. In 1735, he was ordered to recast the bell made by Alexander Grigoriev (1655), shattered during the 1701 fire. Unfortunately, Ivan Motorin died when the work was in full swing. The whole responsibility for the making of the Tsar Bell was placed upon his son Mikhail Motorin.

== Mikhail Ivanovich Motorin ==
There is little information available on Mikhail Ivanovich Motorin (Михаил Иванович Моторин) (? – 1750) after he finished casting the Tsar Bell. Historians know that in 1736 he made a bell for the Epiphany Monastery. In 1737, he also cast a 1.8-tonne bell for the Church of Archangel Gabriel. Both of these bells, however, were destroyed by the Soviets in the 1930s.

== See also ==
- List of Russian inventors
