= Saint Onuphrius Church, Rukomysh =

Ukrainian church in Rukomysh, Ukraine

Saint Onuphrius Church
- Церква святого Онуфрія
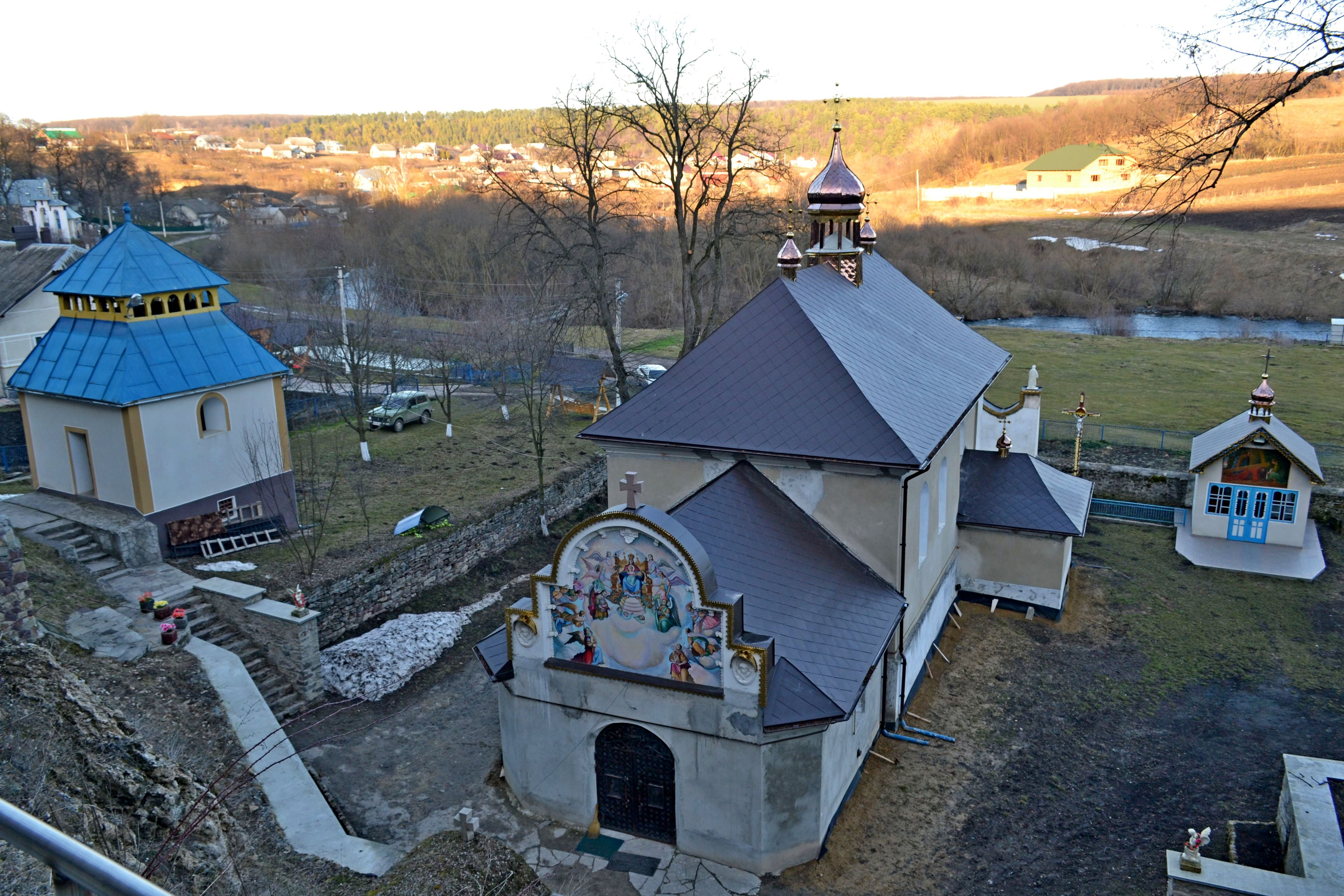

- Location within Ternopil Oblast

Location
- Location: Rukomysh
- Coordinates: 49°05′41.90″N 25°22′38.64″E

Architecture
- Completed: 1768

Saint Onuphrius Church (Ukrainian: Церква святого Онуфрія) is a small historic defensive parish church in Rukomysh, Chortkiv Raion, Ternopil Oblast, Ukraine.

== History ==
Consecrated in 1768 as a Greek Catholic Church, it is currently a parish church under the jurisdiction of the Orthodox Church of Ukraine (until 2018, it belonged to the Ukrainian Autocephalous Orthodox Church). It is famous primarily for its carved statue of Saint Onuphrius, believed to have been created by Johann Georg Pinsel.

The church was closed by the Bolshevik authorities in 1953.

On 30 July 2012, rocks fell on the vestibule of the church and destroyed it; the cause of the incident was explosions during the construction of a bypass road near Buchach. However, the statue of Saint Onuphrius survived, with only part of one finger on his hand being damaged.

== Bibliography ==
- Sadok Barącz: Pamiątki buczackie. Lwów: Drukarnia Gazety Narodowej, 1882, 168 s..
- Mychało Stankewycz: Buczacz ta okołyci. Lwów: СКІМ, 2010, 256 s., іl. ISBN 966-95709-0-4.
- "Rukomysz". Geographical Dictionary of the Kingdom of Poland (in Polish). 9. Warszawa: Kasa im. Józefa Mianowskiego. 1888. p. 960.
