= Metropolitan Palace, Lviv =

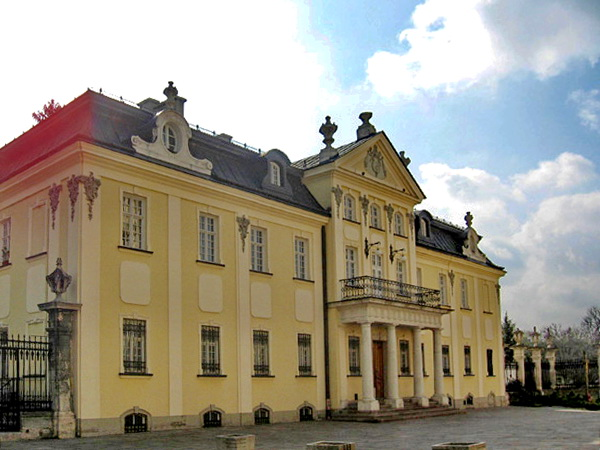
- The palace of Greek Catholic metropolitans in Lviv.
- Interactive map of the Metropolitan Palace, Lviv area
- Alternative names: Greek Catholic Archbishops Palace

General information
- Architectural style: Baroque, Neo-Classical
- Coordinates: 49.8386°N 24.0138°E
- Year built: 1761-62

Design and construction
- Architect: Clement Fessinger

The Metropolitan Palace, also known as Greek Catholic Archbishops Palace, opposite St. George's Cathedral in Lviv, Ukraine, has been the principal residence of the Metropolitans of the Ukrainian Greek-Catholic Church since the 16th century. The current building was erected in 1761-62 to Clement Fessinger's designs and displays traits of the transition from Baroque to Neo-Classical. The façade bears a plaque in memory of Archbishop Andrey Sheptytsky. On the west side of the palace extends an old flower garden. Pope John Paul II stayed at the palace during his 2001 visit to Ukraine.
