= St. George's Cathedral, Lviv =

Greek Catholic church in Lviv, Ukraine

Coordinates: 49°50′19.48″N 24°0′46.19″E

St. George's Cathedral
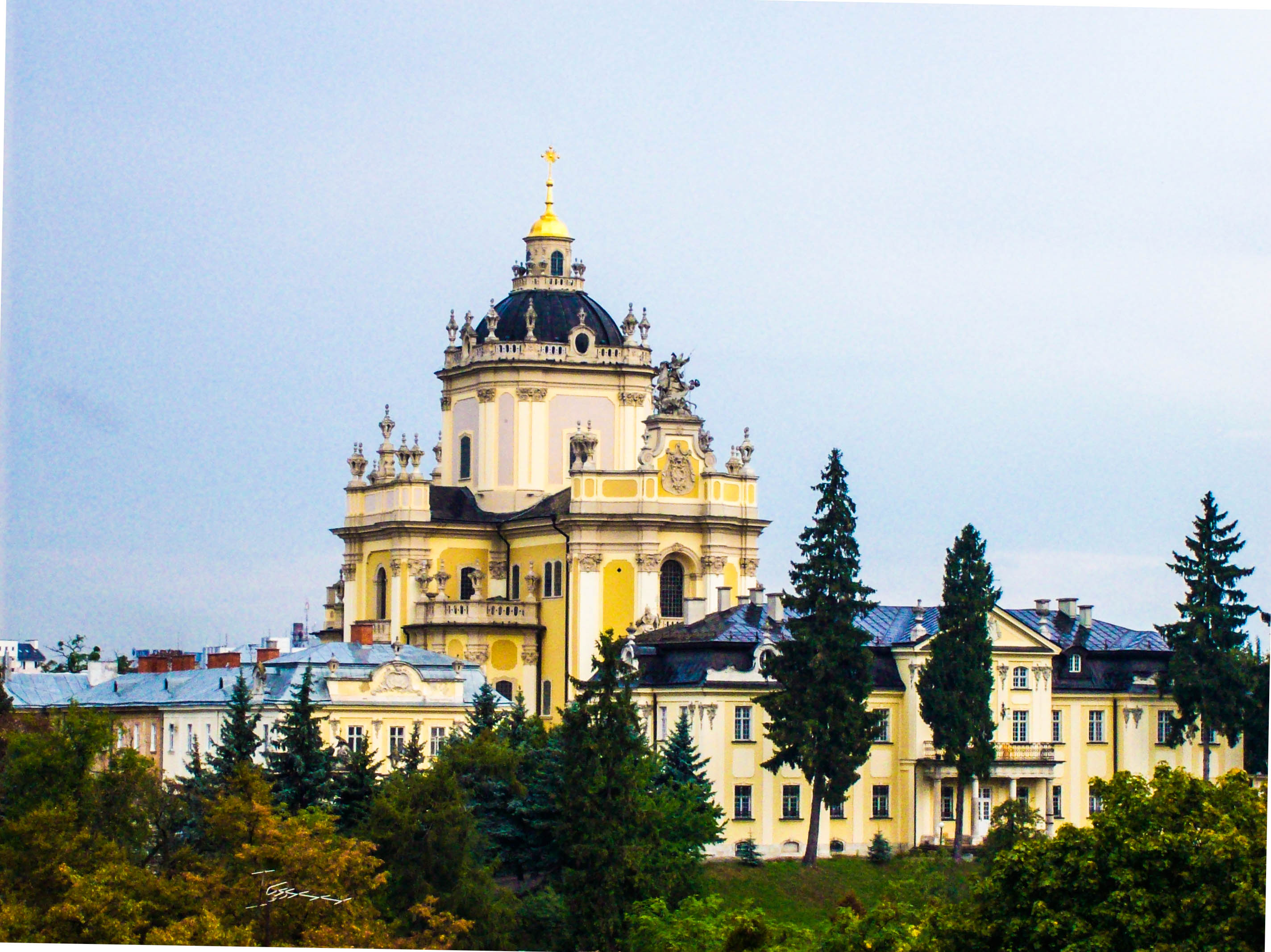
- St. George's Cathedral in Lviv, Ukraine.
- St. George's Cathedral
- Denomination: Catholic Church
- Sui iuris church: Ukrainian Greek Catholic Church

History
- Status: Cathedral

Architecture
- Architect: Bernard Meretyn
- Style: baroque-rococo
- Groundbreaking: 1744
- Completed: 1760

Administration
- Province: Ukrainian Catholic Archeparchy of Lviv

Clergy
- Archbishop: Ihor Vozniak

St. George's Cathedral (Ukrainian: Собор святого Юра, translit. Sobor sviatoho Yura) is a baroque-rococo cathedral located in the city of Lviv, the historic capital of western Ukraine. It was constructed between 1744 -1760 on a hill overlooking the city. This is the third manifestation of a church to inhabit the site since the 13th century, and its prominence has repeatedly made it a target for invaders and vandals. The cathedral also holds a predominant position in Ukrainian religious and cultural terms. During the 19th and 20th centuries, the cathedral served as the mother church of the Ukrainian Greek Catholic Church.

== History ==
A church has stood on St. George Hill (Ukrainian: Святоюрська гора, translit. sviatoyurs'ka hora) since around 1280, dating back to a time when the area was still part of the Principality of Halych-Volhynia. After the original wooden church and the fortress it was situated in were destroyed by King Casimir III of Poland in 1340, a four-column Byzantine basilica was constructed for the local Eastern Orthodox Church.

In 1642 a printing workshop was established at the cathedral by Orthodox bishop Arseniy Zheliborskyi. In July 1700, the Act of Unification of the Lviv archeparchy with the Holy See (the Bishop of Rome – the Pope) was proclaimed in this older version of St. George's when bishop Joseph Shumlanskyi openly embraced the Union of Brest (1596).

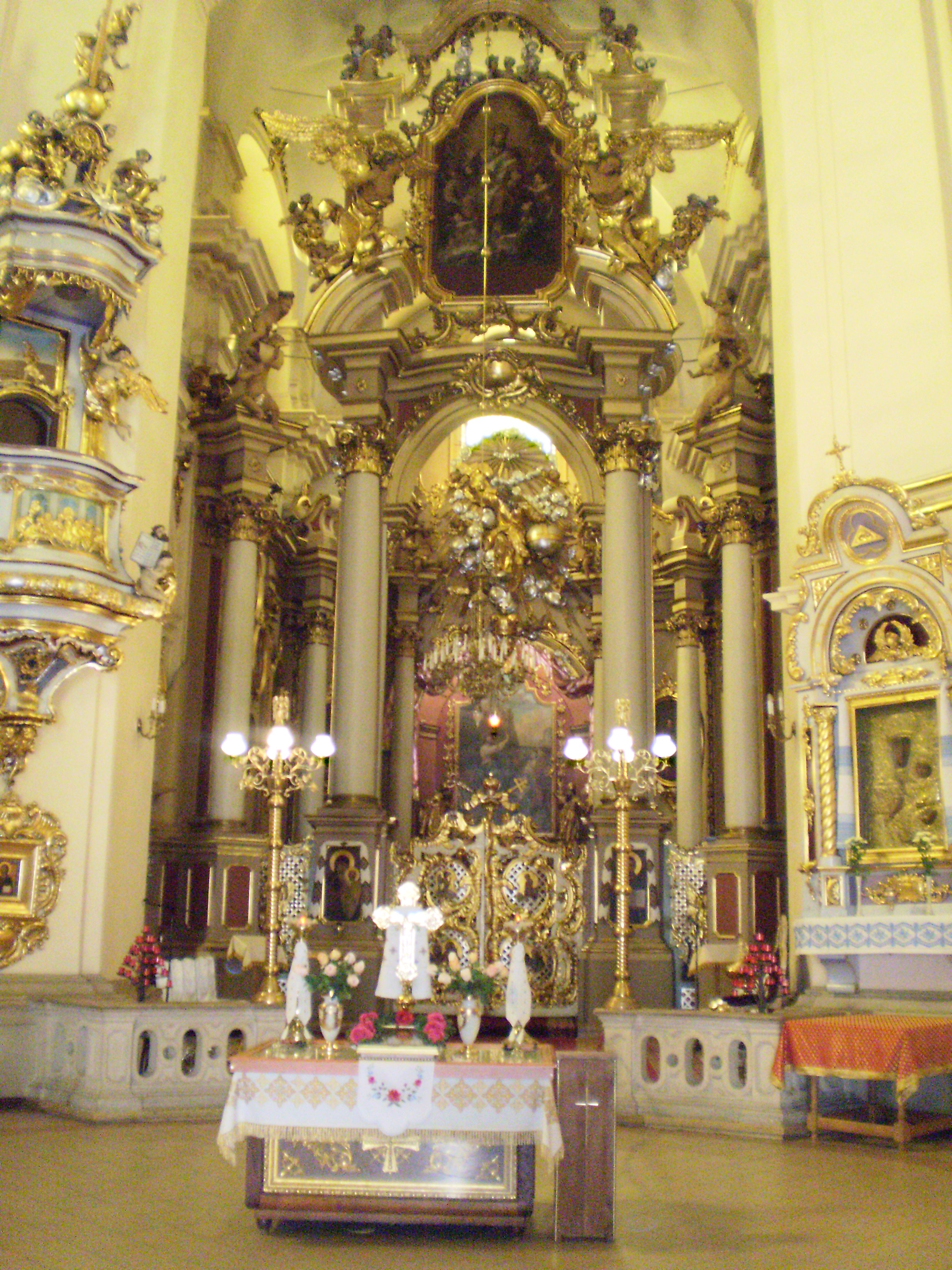

Construction of the present Cathedral was started in 1746 by Metropolitan Athanasius Szeptycki and finished in 1762 by Leo Szeptycki. Following the necessity of transferring the seat of the metropolitan of the Church to Lviv in the 1800s, St. George's Cathedral became the mother church of the Ukrainian Greek Catholic Church (UGCC).

After the Second World War, Soviet authorities began persecuting the UGCC, imprisoning the newly ordained Archbishop of Lviv, Josyf Slipyj, in 1945, as well as the rest of the church hierarchy. In March 1946, the cathedral hosted the Synod of Lviv, which nullified the Union of Brest. A young Volodymyr Sterniuk (future archbishop and leader of the UGCC), concealed in the church loft, witnessed the decision to join the Metropolinate of Halychyna with the Russian Orthodox Church, along with the rest the catholic parishes across Soviet Ukraine. The Cathedral was reconsecrated as Saint Yury's, and became the mother church of the Lvіv-Ternopіl diocese.

The UGCC reemerged in 1989, when it was recognized by the Soviet authorities in the midst of Perestroika, and began to reclaim parishes which they had ceded 45 years earlier. On August 12, 1990, members of the People's Movement of Ukraine party occupied and commandeered the cathedral. Two days later, the governing council of the Lviv Oblast recognized UGCC's claim to the cathedral, and it has remained a centre for the UGCC throughout the early years of Ukraine's independence.

Restoration of the cathedral took place in 1996 to commemorate the 400th anniversary of the Union of Brest. However, restoration of the cathedral's grounds is ongoing.

In August 2005, the seat of the Major Archbishop of the UGCC was moved to Kyiv, the nation's capital, changing from The Major Archbishop of Lviv to The Major Archbishop of Kyiv-Halych. However, the cathedral remains one of the most important churches in Ukraine, and functions as the central church of the Ukrainian Catholic Archeparchy of Lviv.

== Architectural features ==
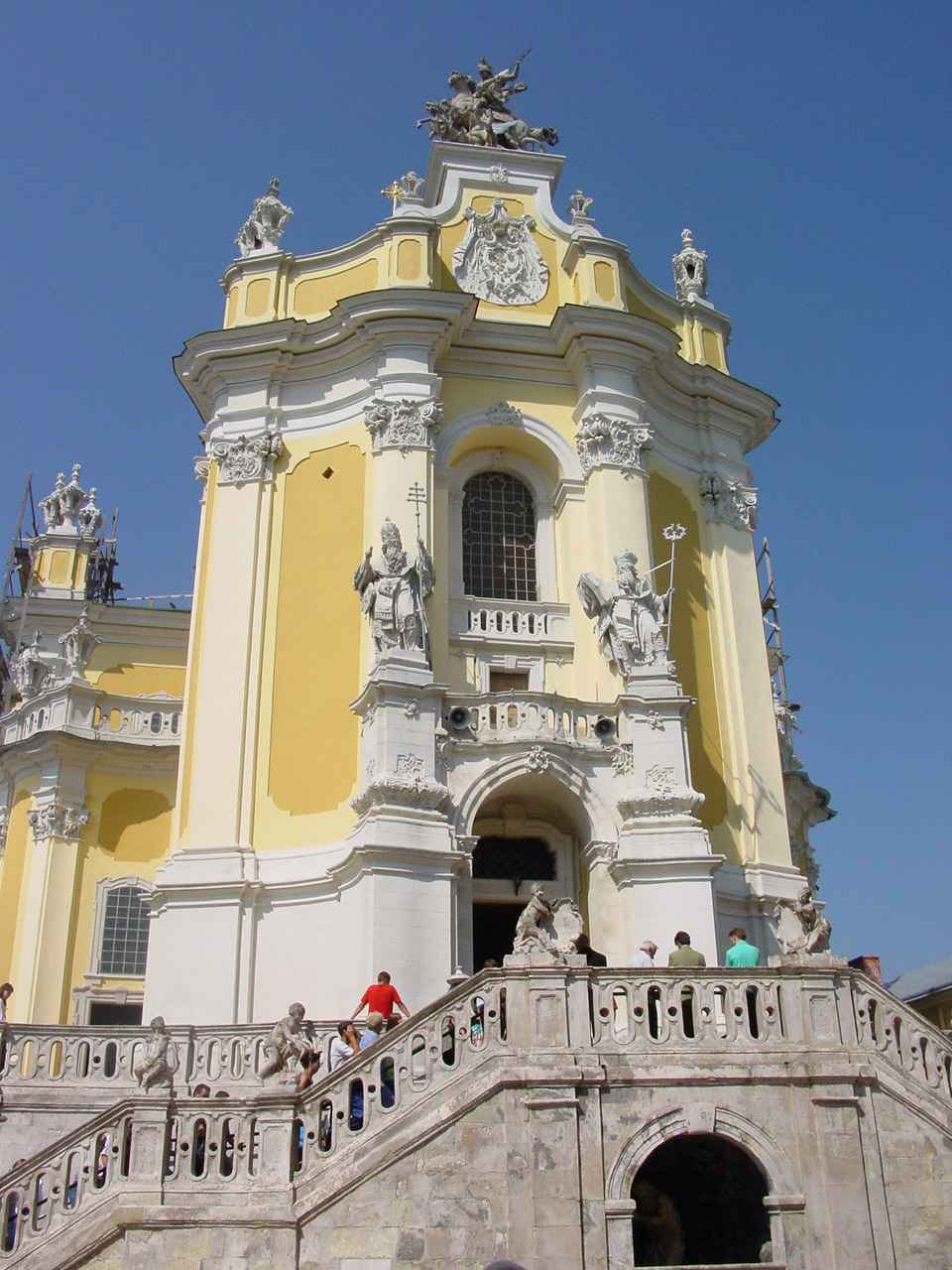

Designed by architect Bernard Meretyn and sculptor Johann Georg Pinsel, St. George's Cathedral reflects both Western influences and the traditions of Ukrainian church construction. An expressive statue of St. George the Dragon-slayer, by Pinsel, stands in the church attic. Pinsel's hands also created the stone images of Pope St. Leo and St. Athanasius who stand on guard over the church portal "warning with their stern look about their readiness to fight against anyone not showing enough venerability." In contrast, the architecture of the courtyard has a more soothing effect on visitors.

An icon for the Church parish by Luka Dolynskyi depicts the banishment of merchants from the Temple. Another icon, Apostles, conveys a very strong expression of pain and desperate begging of the human being to the Almighty to bestow eternity on "a feeble soul stiff with the fear of death."

The most precious relic of the church is the Wonder-working Icon of the Virgin Mary (17th century). It was brought to Lviv from Terebovlia in 1674 by bishop Joseph Shumlianskyi.

In the Cathedral's tombs are buried distinguished figures of the Ukrainian Greek-Catholic Church. Among them are Cardinal Sylvester Sembratovych, Metropolitan Andrei Sheptytsky, Major Metropolitan Josyf Slipyj, Metropolitan Volodymyr Sterniuk, and Cardinal Myroslav Ivan Lubachivsky.

The architectural ensemble of St. George's Cathedral also includes a belfry, the Baroque Metropolitan Palace and chapter house, as well as a garden enclosed behind two gates.

== See also ==
- Saint George: Devotions, traditions and prayers
- 360-degrees interactive panorama of the interior
- Photos of St. George's Cathedral in Lviv
- Photo gallery of St. George's Cathedral
