= Monastyryska =

City in Ternopil Oblast, Ukraine

Monastyryska Монастириська
- City
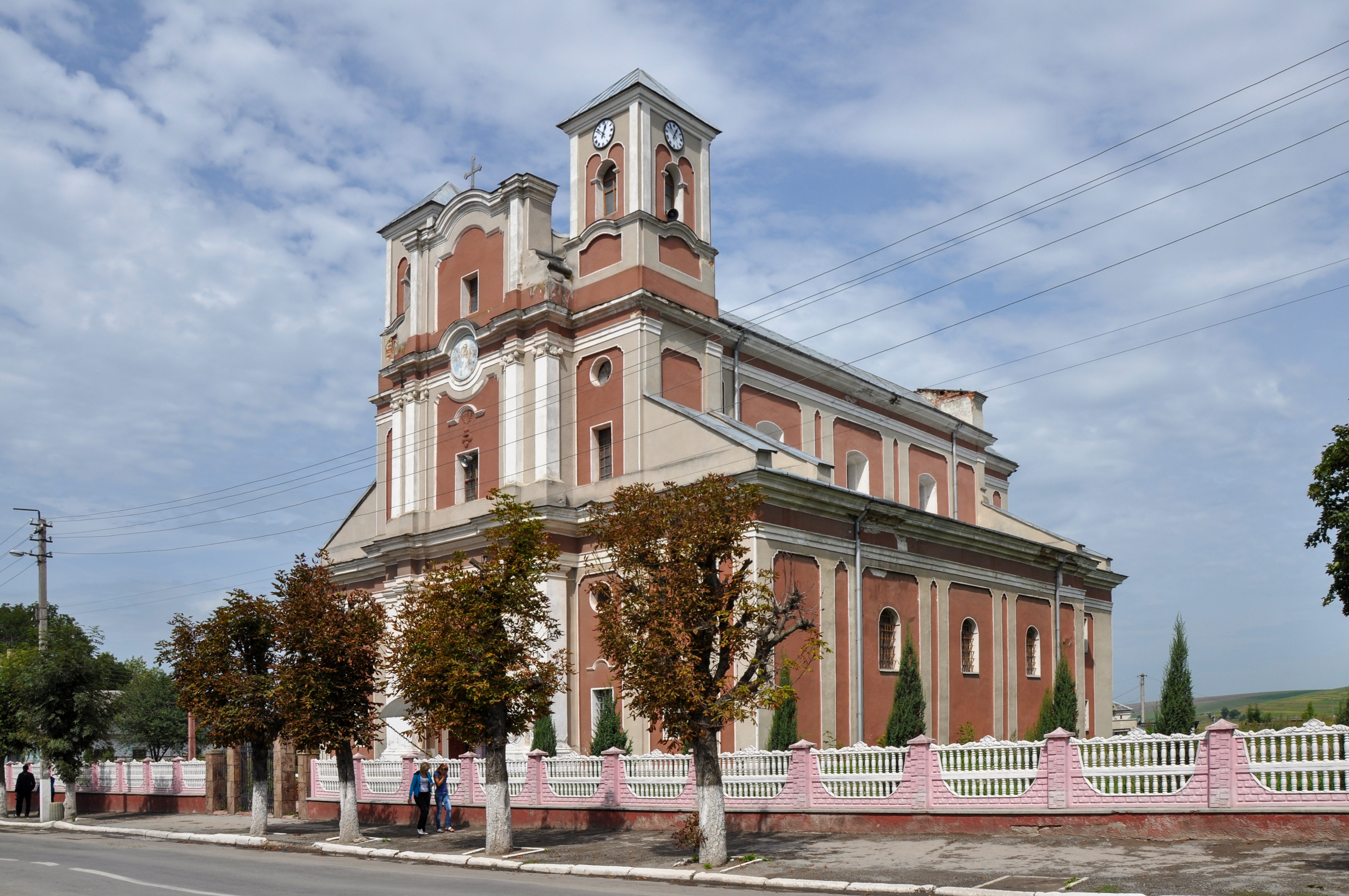
- Dormition Church

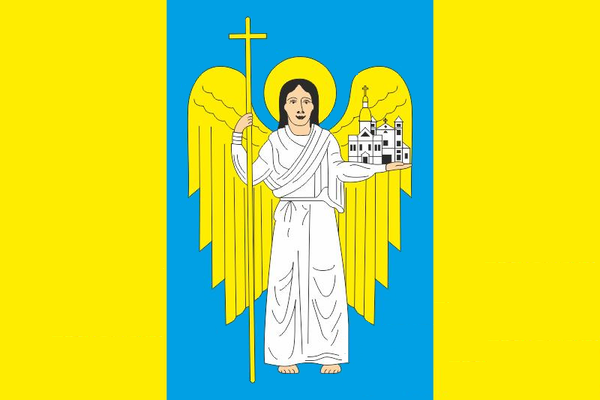
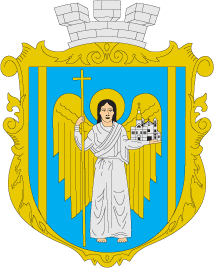
- Flag Coat of arms

- Location within Ternopil Oblast Location within Ukraine
- Coordinates: 49°05′20″N 25°10′10″E
- Country: Ukraine
- Oblast: Ternopil Oblast
- Raion: Chortkiv Raion
- Hromada: Monastyryska urban hromada
- Magdeburg rights: 1454

Area
  - Total: 14.7 km^{2} (5.7 sq mi)

Population (2022)
  - Total: 5,380
  - Density: 366/km^{2} (948/sq mi)
- Time zone: UTC+2 (EET)
  - Summer (DST): UTC+3 (EEST)

Monastyryska (Ukrainian: Монастириська [monɐstɪˈrɪsʲkɐ]; Polish: Monasterzyska; Yiddish: מאָנעסטרישטש, romanized: Monastrishtch) is a small city in Chortkiv Raion, Ternopil Oblast, Ukraine. In 2001, the population was 6,344. The town is situated on the river Koropets, 15 km (9.32 mi) from Buchach, 140 km (86.99 mi) south-east from Lviv, on the road between Ternopil or Berezhany and Ivano-Frankivsk. The river Koropets forms a wide lake. Monasteryska borders Hryhoriv and Bertnyky on the east, Ozekhiv on the south, Vycholky and Stara Huta on the west, Nova Huta, Shveykiv and Kovalivka on the north. It hosts the administration of Monastyryska urban hromada, one of the hromadas of Ukraine. Population: 5,380 (2022 estimate).

Its older name was Monastyryshche (Монастирище), which gave rise to the Yiddish name Monastrishtsh.

Prior to the war in 1939, the town had 1741 Roman Catholics (Poles), 408 Greek-Catholics (Ukrainians), and 1,310 Jews. The local Roman Catholic church has existed since 1702.

== History ==
Historical affiliations

Crown of the Kingdom of Poland 1454–1569
Polish–Lithuanian Commonwealth 1569–1772
Habsburg monarchy 1772–1804
Austrian Empire 1804–1918
West Ukrainian People's Republic 1918–1919
Second Polish Republic 1919–1945
Soviet Union 1939–1941
Nazi Germany 1941–1944 (occupation)
Soviet Union 1944–1945
Soviet Union 1945–1991
Ukraine 1991–present

The first written mentions appear in documents from 1433 and 1437, referencing it as the property of the knight Sigismund. From 1454 to 1465, Monastyryska was owned by Teodorik Buchatsky-Yazlovetsky, later by Mykhailo "Muzhyla" Buchatsky, and from 1468, it was possessed by Jan of Yazlovets. By 1478, Jan of Porokhova had ownership. In 1454, it is noted as a town with Magdeburg rights and a castle.

For most of its history, the city belonged to the Kingdom of Poland. From the mid-14th century to 1772 (see Partitions of Poland), it was part of Ruthenian Voivodeship. Monastyryska received a town charter in 1454, and in February 1653, a battle between Polish and Cossack troops took place here, during the Khmelnytsky Uprising. The Polish army under Stefan Czarniecki failed to capture the town, defended by Ivan Bohun.

After the partitions of Poland, Monastyryska was annexed by the Habsburg Empire. It remained in the province of Galicia until November 1918. In the Second Polish Republic, it was part of Buchach County, Tarnopol Voivodeship. Following the Soviet Invasion of Poland (September 17, 1939), the town was annexed by the Soviet Union. Many Lemkos families came to Monastyryska after Operation Vistula. Following the Nazi invasion of the Soviet Union, the town came under German rule until 1944. During this time, the town's Jewish population was wiped out, with the majority deported to Belzec extermination camp, and others deported and killed in nearby towns.

Since 1991, it has belonged to independent Ukraine.

Until 18 July 2020, Monastyryska was the administrative center of Monastyryska Raion. The raion was abolished in July 2020 as part of the administrative reform of Ukraine, which reduced the number of raions of Ternopil Oblast to three. The area of Monastyryska Raion was merged into Chortkiv Raion.

== Roman Catholic cemetery ==
Monastyryska has one of the largest Roman Catholic cemeteries in the region of Podole, with more than 2,000 stone tombs. The cemetery has the burial chapel of the Potocki family as well as a military chapel, where veterans of the January Uprising and soldiers of the World War I Polish Legions rest.

== Gallery ==
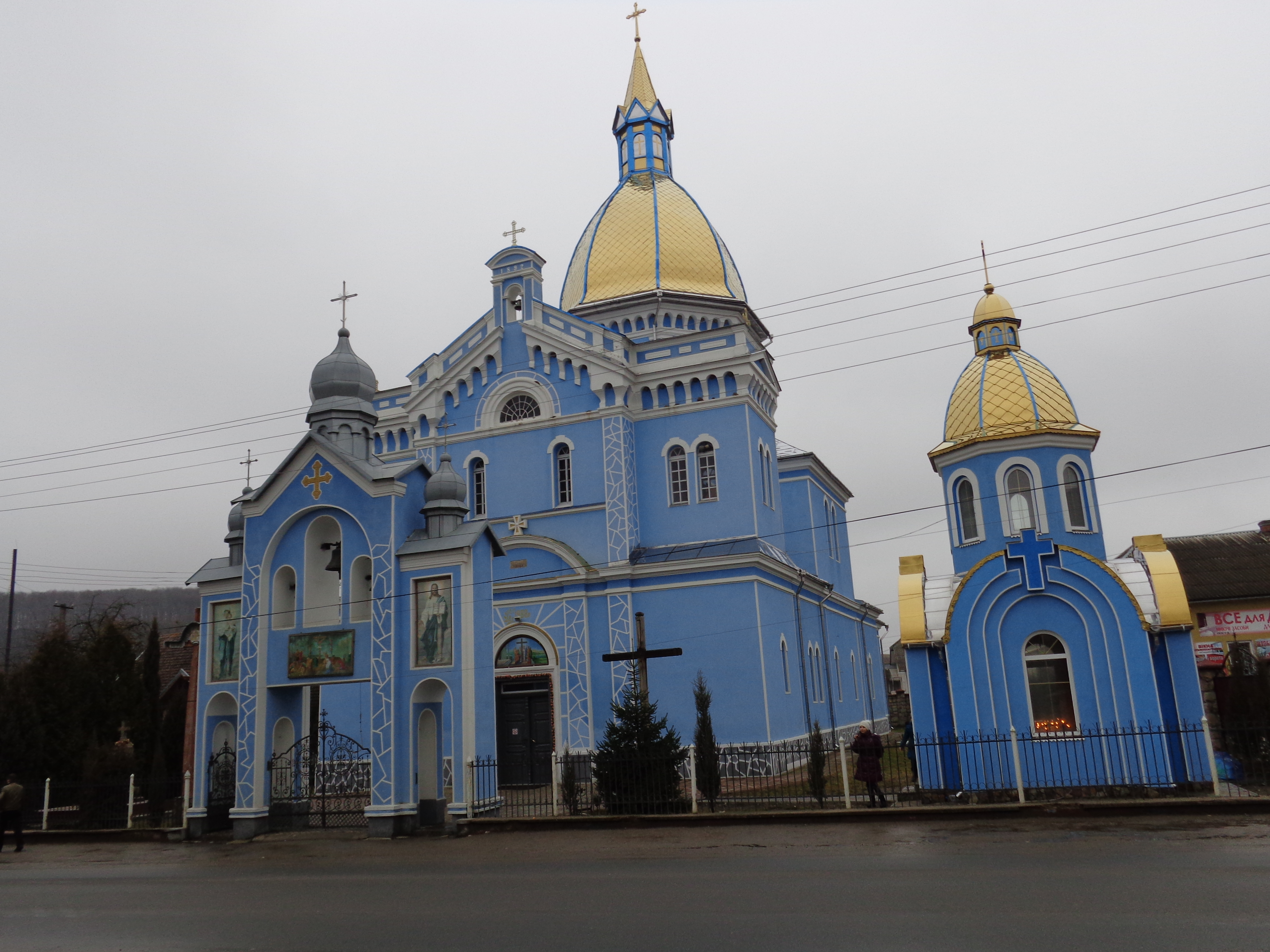
Exaltation of the Holy Cross Church

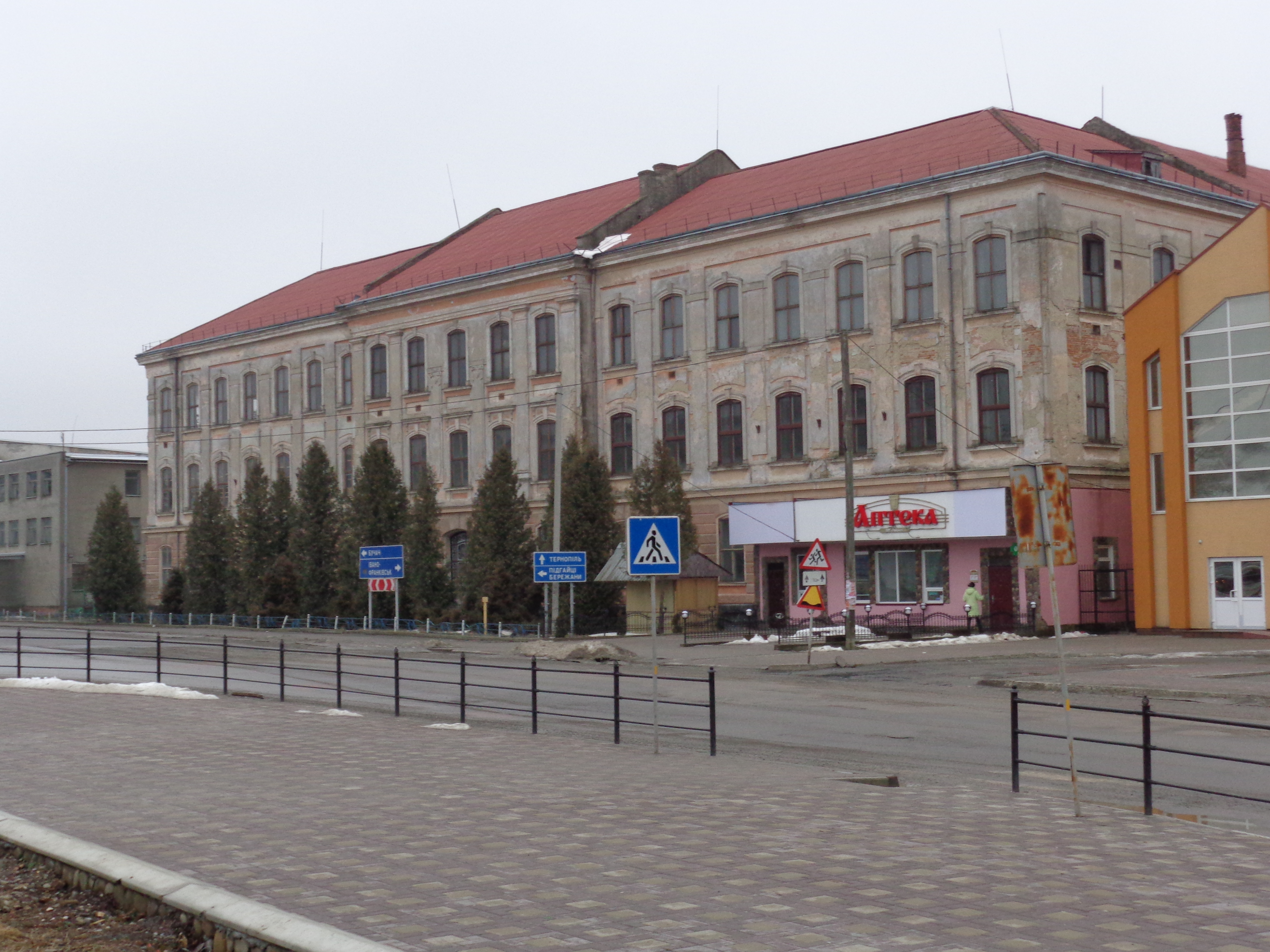
Former tobacco factory

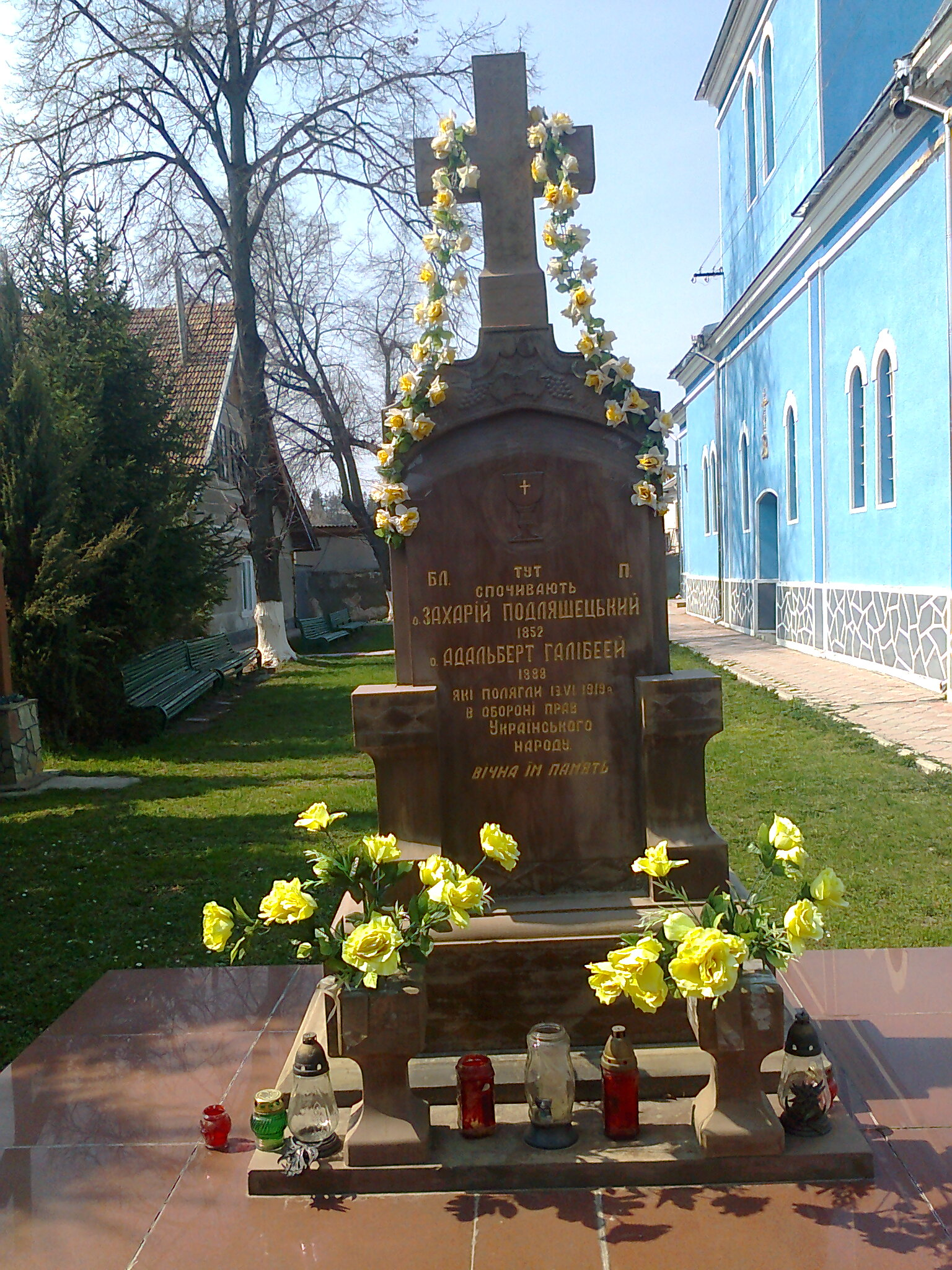
Grave of Ukrainian priests

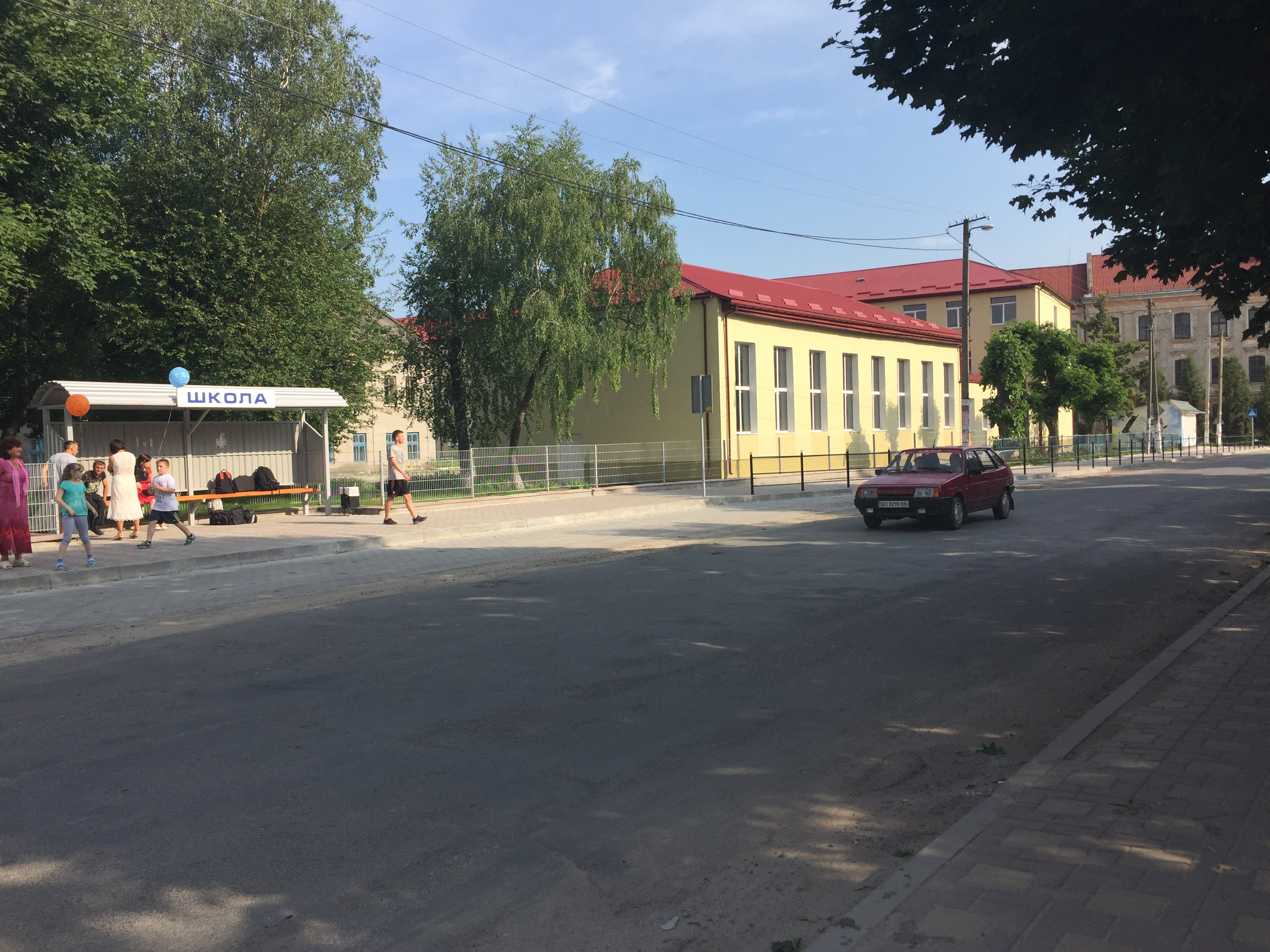
Primary school in June 2017

== Notable people ==
- Norbert Rybak – Ukrainian public figure,
- Zenon Bazyli Buczkowski – Polish microbiologist and medicine professor,
- Malka Lee – Yiddish writer,
- Stanisław Rossowski – Polish journalist, writer, and poet,
- Horacy Safrin – Polish satirist, translator of Jewish literature,
- Alfred Suchecki – Polish criminologist, pioneer of cheiloscopy (the study of lip prints),
- Gabriel Turowski – Polish physician, immunologist, and microbiologist,
- Carolyne zu Sayn-Wittgenstein – Polish noblewoman, journalist, and essayist who is best known for her 40-year relationship with a musician Franz Liszt
- Mieczysław Zygmunt Wiśniewski – Polish soccer goalkeeper of Cracovia Krakow and Wisla Krakow, participant in the 1924 Olympic Games,
- Jan Zaleski – Polish philologist, historian of language and numismatist
- Olena Kysilevska, Ukrainian activist, journalist, and writer
- for centuries, the town was one of seats of the Potocki family, to which it belonged until 1844. Among famous members of the family from Monastyryska is Józef Makary Potocki, Count Antoni Potocki.
