= Malka Lee =

American poet

- מלכה לי
- Lee in 1967
- Born: July 4, 1904; Monastrishtsh, Galicia
- Died: March 22, 1976 (aged 71); New York City
- Occupation: Poet

Malka Lee (Yiddish: מלכה לי) (July 4, 1904 – March 22, 1976) was an American poet and author. She is the author of Durkh Kindershe Oygn (Through the Eyes of Childhood), published in 1955 and dedicated to her family, who were killed by the Nazis in the shtetl of Monastrishtsh (now Monastyryska, Ukraine) in 1941, as well as six volumes of poetry in Yiddish, her mother tongue, much of it about her experience of observing the Holocaust from the safety of the United States.

== Personal life ==
Lee was born into a Hasidic family in Monastrishtsh, Galicia where her parents Frieda Duhl and Chaim Leopold gave her a religious upbringing. During World War I Lee and her family fled to Vienna. During this time she attended the Gymnasium where she studied German and Hebrew. After the war, the family returned to Poland. Her father considered Lee's literary ambitions an 'irreligious act,' so in response in 1921, at the age of sixteen, Lee emigrated to New York completely alone.

In New York, Lee worked in a sweatshop as a seamstress. Through this role she was introduced to the workers movement, and realized her potential to impact society using her voice. Lee wanted to be an activist, so from 1921 to 1922 she studied at the Jewish Teachers Seminary. Until 1923, she furthered her studies and attended courses at Hunter College and City College in New York.

She married writer Aaron Rappaport, with whom she had two children, Joseph (b. 1924) and Yvette (b.1937). Lee and Rappaport owned and managed a bungalow colony in High Falls, New York, where many Yiddish intellectuals and writers came together. After Rappaport's death in 1966, Lee married Moshe Besser.

Malka Lee died in New York on March 22, 1976.

== Poetry ==
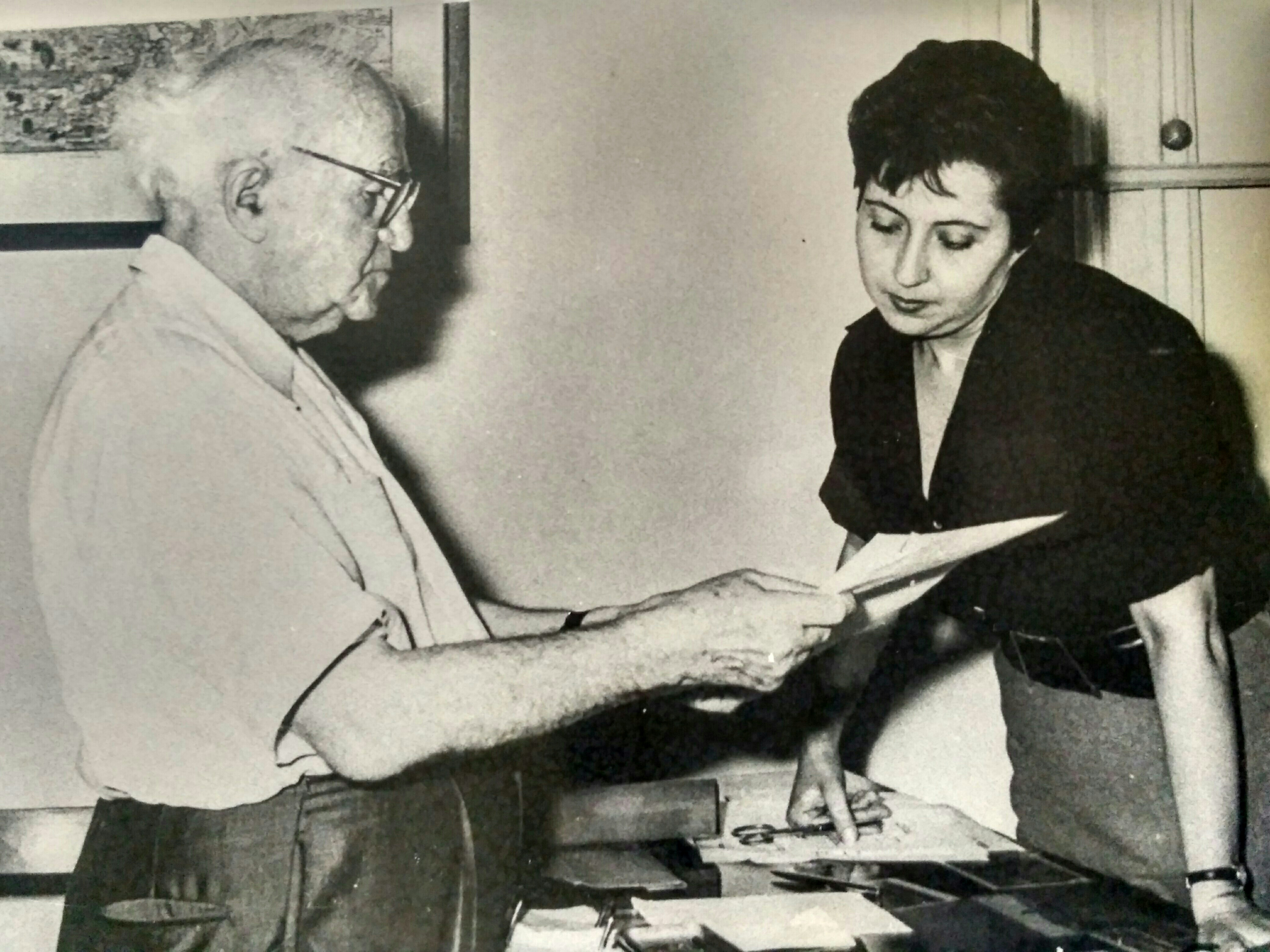
Malka Lee working with Ben-Gurion

Lee wrote in German as a young girl, but switched to Yiddish when she emigrated to the United States in 1921. Her first published poem appeared in 1922, and she continued to write until 1972. Her poetry between 1945 and 1950 is about the pain of watching from a distance as her childhood home and family were destroyed during the Holocaust. One of her brothers, Aaron Leopold survived the Holocaust as a soldier in the Soviet army. She helped Aaron and his wife Dina to emigrate to Canada as the United States had closed their doors to many immigrants after the war. Other poems expressed her intimate feelings, her joy in life and nature, and national themes such as love of the Yiddish language, Israel and America, and her devotion to Zionism.

A short autobiographic article published in July 1927 in the Yiddish leftwing newspaper Frayhayt was later expanded into a book of memoirs entitled Durkh Kindershe Oygn (Through the eyes of childhood) (1955) and dedicated to her family, shot by the Germans in Monastrishtsh in 1941. A portion of this work was translated into English in the book Found Treasures: Stories by Yiddish Women Writers (1994). Her other volume of prose, Mayselekh far Yoselen (Little stories for Yosel) (1969), is a book of short stories and fables for children.

== Works ==
- Durkh Kindershe Oygn (1955)
- Durkh Loytere Kvaln (1950)
- Gezangen (1940)
- In Likht fun Doyres (1961)
- Kines fun Undzer Tsayt (1945)
- Lider (1932)
- Mayselekh far Yoselen (1969)
- Untern Nusnboym (1969)

== Sources ==
- Hyman, Paula E. & Dash Moore, Deborah. Jewish Women in America, Vol I. Routledge, 1977. ISBN 0-415-91934-7
