= Horacy Safrin =

Polish poet, comedian, author and translator

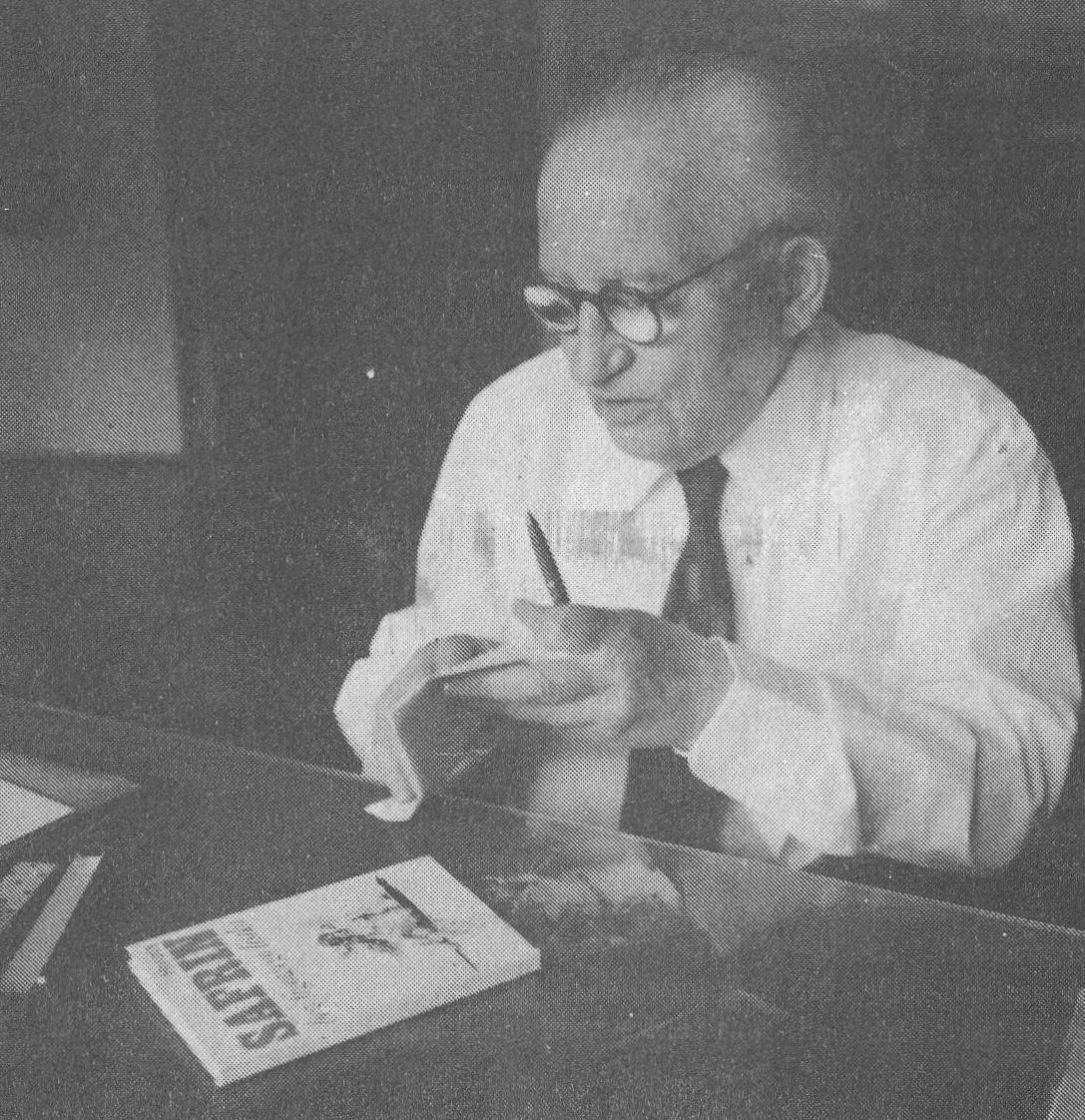
Horacy Safrin

Horacy Safrin (1899 – 1980) was a Polish poet, comedian, author and translator. He is best known as a successful translator of Polish literature to Yiddish language and Jewish literature to Polish language.

== Biography ==
He was born on 11 January 1899 in Galicia in Monasterzyska (now Monastyryska in Ukraine), in a family of Jewish ancestry. He studied English and German philology at the Vienna University. In 1914 he published his first collection of poems (Poezje). After the Great War he settled in Stanisławów, where he became a literary director of a local Jewish theatre, a position he held until the outbreak of World War II. At the same time he continued to publish books on theatre and collections of poems, both in Polish and German.

He spent the World War II in the Soviet Union, after the war he was depatriated to Łódź, where he remained for the rest of his life. He died there on 23 August 1980.

== Selected works ==
- Ośla szczęka (short stories, 1957)
- Mucha na cokole (satires, 1959)
- Głupcy z Głupska (satires, 1962)
- Kain i Hewel (poems, 1963)
- Przy szabasowych świecach. Humor żydowski (1963)
- Ucieszne i osobliwe historie mojego życia (memoirs, 1970)
- Bez figowego listka (satires, 1972)
- W arce Noego. Bajki oraz facecje żydowskie (1979)
- Przy szabasowych świecach - wieczór drugi (1981)

== Sources ==
- Lesław Bartelski M., nd: Polscy pisarze współcześni, 1939-1991: Leksykon. Wydawn. Nauk. PWN ISBN 83-01-11593-9
