= Vassili Grigorjev =

Russian-Estonian farmer and politician

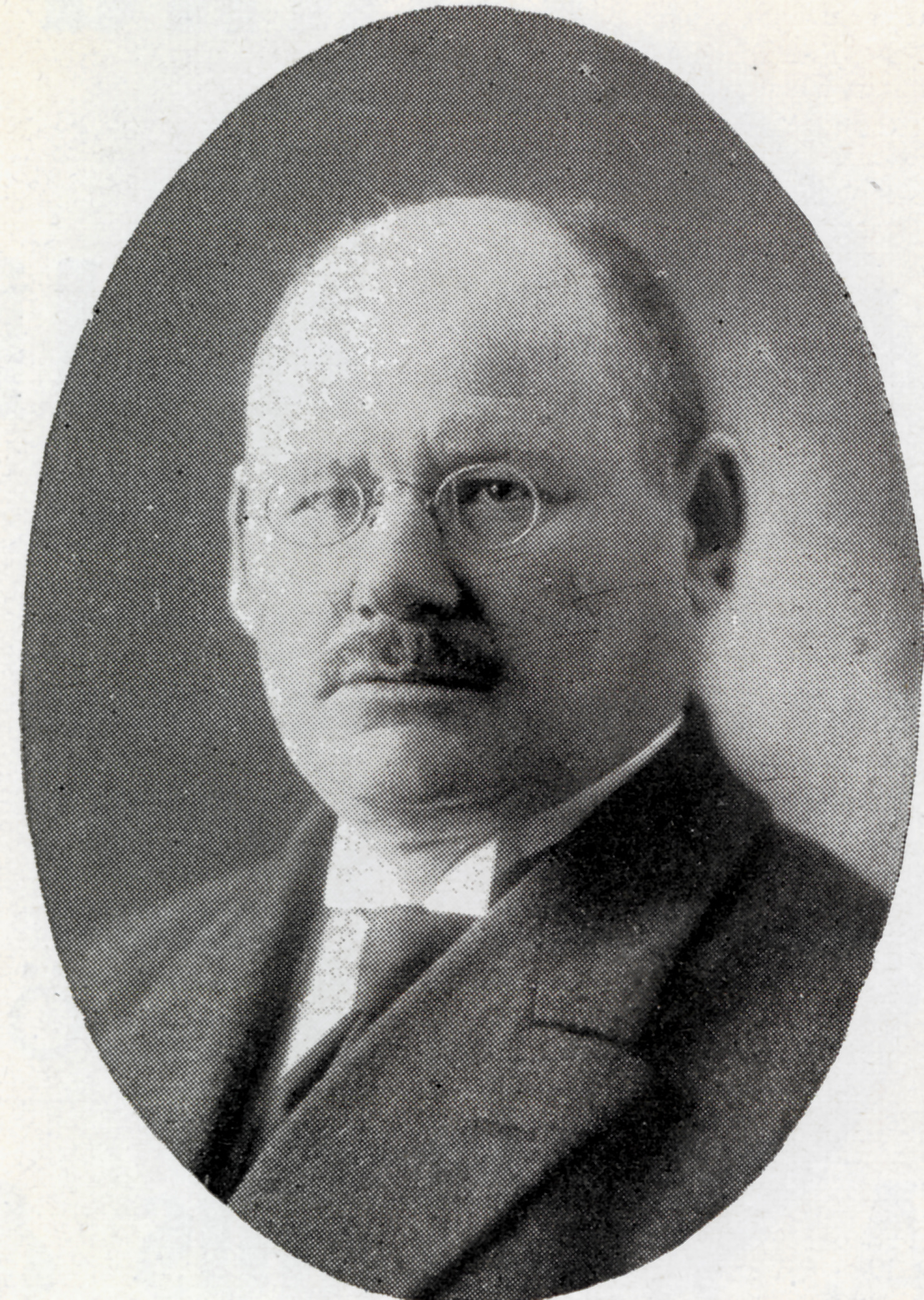
Vassili Grigorjev

Vassili Grigorjev (11 March 1870 – ?) was a Russian-Estonian farmer and politician.

Grigorjev was born in Dymkovo, Pechorsky District, Russian Empire, into a poor peasant family. He received a secondary education. After military service, he worked for the Russian Ministry of Internal Affairs for 22 years. In 1918, he moved to Estonia, where he became a farmer. He later became a pediatrician and journalist.

Grigorjev was a member of the Riigikogu for the Estonian Labour Party from 1920 to 1929.

In 1927, Grigorjev and a number of other people from Petseri County were arrested on charges of treason due to them planning a possible separatist movement in Petseri County and Narva in response to Petseri County being given to Estonia as a result of the Treaty of Tartu, as well as working with Soviet intelligence as a member of the Riigikogu. He was sentenced to death in absentia.

After the Baltic Operation, where Nazi Germany invaded the Baltic States, Grigorjev was captured by their forces. His fate is unknown.
