= Alexander Grigoriev (bellfounder) =

Russian bellfounder

Alexander Grigoriev, son of Lykov (Russian: Александр Григорьев сын Лыков) (1634? - after 1676) was a Russian cannon and bellfounder.

== Career ==
=== Early career, avoiding the plague ===
In 1651, Alexander Grigoriev was accepted to the Moscow Cannon Yard as a "bell person" (колокольное лицо) at the recommendation of a bellmaker Yemelyan Danilov and a number of Muscovite cannonmakers. Soon, Grigoriev was given seven apprentices, with whom he would recast the Annunciation Bell (Благовестный колокол) for the Church of Saint Antipius in Moscow and cast six spare alarm bells for other fortresses. In 1654, Alexander Grigoriev and Feodor Motorin were sent to Novgorod, where they would cast a 16-ton bell for the Saint Sophia Cathedral. Their assignment in Novgorod allowed them to escape the fate of some 150,000 Muscovites, who would die from bubonic plague that year.

=== Important Moscow commissions ===
Upon his return to Moscow in 1655, Grigoriev succeeded to the deceased Yemelyan Danilov and continued his work on creating the most important bell in the country, namely the Big Assumption Bell (some 160 tons), which had been shattered before during a religious celebration. Grandiose work on casting of this bell took place in the Moscow Kremlin from May until late fall. Many of Grigoriev's apprentices took part in this assignment, some of whom would become famous bellmakers themselves (Khariton Ivanov, Pyotr Stepanov, Fyodor Dmitriyev). The Big Assumption Bell would only be hung in 1668 in a custom-built wooden belltower. The bell was lost in a Kremlin fire in 1701. Its metal was later used for the casting of the Tsar Bell.

In 1655, Alexander Grigoriev founded an alarm bell for the Frolovskaya (Spasskaya) Tower of the Moscow Kremlin (approx. 3 tons) using the remains of a shattered bell and increasing its weight from 150 to 194 poods. In 1656, Alexander Grigoriev and Feodor Motorin were sent to the Iversky Monastery in Valdai, where they would cast an 11.5-ton bell at the request of Patriarch Nikon. The bell did not survive to this day. The legend has it, however, that Alexander Grigoriev gave out the remaining bronze to his local assistants, giving birth to a tradition of making the now famous little Valdai bells (Валдайские колокольчики).

=== Status as a master ===
In 1657, he cast a bell weighing 0.75 tons for the Kotelniy ryad (Котельный ряд; one of the slobodas in Moscow). In 1665, Alexander Grigoriev founded a 5-ton bell for the Simonov Monastery, on which the inscription called him "cannon and bell master of the state" for the first time. In 1668, he cast his best bell ever, namely the Big Annunciation Bell, for the Savvino-Storozhevsky Monastery near Zvenigorod, which would be considered the most sonorous bell in Russia. The work was done in 130 days (a very short period of time in those days). For this bell, Tsar Alexis I rewarded the master with a big piece of cloth along with money and bread allowance. It is said that Feodor Chaliapin used to admire the sound of the Big Annunciation Bell. Unfortunately, the bell was shattered to pieces in 1941 as the Soviets were trying to take it down due to the threat of the approaching German army.

=== Fate of his household ===
Alexander Grigoriev was last mentioned in 1676, when ten of his apprentices assisted Khariton Ivanov in casting ten harquebuses at the Cannon Yard. Alexander Grigoriev's outstanding work allows historians to speculate about the existence of Grigoriev's school of casting in the 17th century. There were 21 known apprentices of Grigoriev, many of whom would become famous, as well. Upon Grigoriev's death, his nephew Grigory Yekimov (garnet master) inherited his household in the Pushkarskaya Sloboda, which he would later sell to Feodor Motorin.
