= Tatiana P. Grigorieva =

Russian Japanologist

- Born: December 18, 1929; Leningrad, USSR
- Died: December 22, 2014 (aged 85); Moscow, Russia
- Burial place: Moscow
- Education: Moscow Institute of Oriental Studies, 1952
- Occupations: Russian Japanologist, culturologist, Japanese-Russian translator
- Known for: Books and articles on East Asian (mostly Japanese) culture, art and philosophy

Tatiana P. Grigorieva (Russian: Григорьева, Татьяна Петровна, Japanese: グリゴーリエワ, テー・ペー; born Tatiana P. Topekha) was a Russian Japanologist, essayist, translator editor, and an academic. She is best known as a researcher of Japanese culture, comparative literature scholar, a translator from Japanese into Russian, and an organizer of Russian humanities, who, beside of academic career, put considerable effort in popularization of Japanese culture, aesthetics and literature in Russia. She managed to produce academic works, which not only inspired a lively discussion in academia, but also became widely popular amongst intelligentsia.

Her books helped to transform, in minds of Soviet and Russian intelligentsia, the image of Japanese and Chinese cultures from exotic "orientalist flower" into a living and powerful tradition. In the late Soviet period, when most "ideological" texts were still dominated by dry pseudo-Marxist dogmatism, her academic monographs and translations helped people to overcome pessimism and spiritual depression.

Later in her life, as an original thinker, she had striven to create a humanistic, holistic synthesis of Eastern and Western philosophical paradigms (symbolized by Chinese Dao (Tao) and Judeo-Christian Logos).

== Biography ==
Grigorieva's father Petr P. Topekha (Russian: Топеха Петр Павлович) was a Soviet Japanologist, and a specialist in Japanese labor movement. After her family moved to Moscow, she graduated with the Specialist Degree from Moscow Institute of Oriental Studies in 1952. She studied at the graduate school in Institute of Oriental Languages until 1957, and received a research fellowship in the Institute of Oriental Studies of the Russian Academy of Sciences in 1958.

In 1980, she defended a second academic degree: Doctor of Sciences Doktor nauk in Philology, with a dissertation based on her monograph of Japanese art traditions. From 1988 to 1998, she was a research fellow (1988-1998) at the Department of Comparative Study of Cultures, and was appointed as the head research fellow from 1998 to 2012 after which she was promoted to head research fellow emeritus.

She translated Japanese literary works, and became a Member of Writers' Union of Russia. She was also on the editorial board of the Foreign Literature journal, as well as the chief editor of the Oriental Almanack.

In 1997, she was recognised as the Distinguished Russian Scholar.

== Academic activity ==
Grigorieva supervised dissertations of a few notable Russian Japanologists, e.g., Prof. Evgeny Steiner (https://soas.academia.edu/EvgenySteiner), http://www.hse.ru/data/2012/12/11/1247023902/CV%20HSE%202012.pdf), Prof. Vassili Molodiakov (http://en.jinf.jp/japanaward/h26list), etc.

== Other activities ==
As a free thinker, Grigorieva was a member of the Independent Academy of Aesthetics and Free Arts ( Russian: Независимая Академия Эстетики и Свободных Искусств, http://www.independent-academy.net/).
She also participated actively in the work of International Nicholas Roerich Center, where was the head of the section "Ideas of Russian Cosmism and Eastern teachings". She was the chief editor of two first volumes of works of the center.

== Awards ==
- The Russian Academy of Sciences, Sergey F. Oldenburg's Award Sergey F. Oldenburg's Award, 2003, for a series of monographs on Japanese culture: "The Japanese Aesthetic Tradition", "The Japanese Literature in the 20th Century", "Dao and Logos: The Meeting of Cultures" (all in Russian)

== Selected bibliography ==
=== Books ===
- Японская литература. Краткий очерк. — М., 1964 (в соавторстве) [Japanese Literature:ниу A Short Introduction (in Russian), Moscow, 1964] [url=http://iss.ndl.go.jp/books/R000000004-I969846-00?ar=4e1f |title=Japanese translation?]
- Куникида Доппо. Избранные рассказы /пер. с яп. Т. Топеха. - Москва: Гослитиздат, 1958.
- Одинокий странник: о японском писателе Куникида Доппо. — М., 1967. [Lonely Rambler: Life and Works of Japanese Writer Doppo Kunikida (in Russian), Moscow, 1967]
- Японская художественная традиция. — М., 1979. [The Japanese Aesthetic Tradition (in Russian), Moscow, 1979]
- Японская литература XX века. — М., 1983. [The Japanese Literature in the 20th Century (in Russian), Moscow, 1983]
- Дао и Логос. Встреча культур. — М., 1992. [Dao and Logos: The Meeting of Cultures (in Russian), Moscow, 1992]
- Красотой Японии рожденный. — М., 1993. ["Born by the Beauty of Japan" (in Russian), Moscow, 1993]
- Движение красоты: Размышления о японской культуре. — М., 2005. [The Flow of Beauty: Thoughts about Japanese Culture (in Russian), Moscow, 2005]
- Япония. Путь сердца. — М., 2008. [Japan: The Way of the Heart (in Russian), Moscow, 2008]
- Китай, Россия и Всечеловек. — М.,"Новый Акрополь", 472 стр., ISBN 9785918960127, 2010. [China, Russia and The All-Embracing Human Being (in Russian), Moscow, 2010]

=== Articles ===
- И еще раз о Востоке и Западе // Иностранная литература. 1975. № 7 (пер. в Японии)
- Даосская и буддийская модели мира // Дао и даосизм в Китае. М., 1982
- Встреча с Гумбольдтом — встреча времен // Иностранная литература. 1987. № 8
- Образ мира в культуре // Культура, человек и картина мира. М., 1987
