= Maksim Grigoryev =

Maksim Grigoryev may refer to:

- Maxim Grigoriev (author), Swedish writer and translator
- Maksim Grigoryev (basketball), Russian basketball player
- Maksim Grigoryev (footballer, born 1983), Russian footballer
- Maksim Grigoryev (footballer, born 1990), Russian footballer
