= Grebnevo =

Grebnevo (Russian: Гребнево) is the name of several rural localities in Russia:

- Grebnevo, Moscow Oblast, a village in Grebnevskoye Rural Settlement of Shchyolkovsky District of Moscow Oblast
- Grebnevo, Nizhny Novgorod Oblast, a village in Purekhovsky Selsoviet of Chkalovsky District of Nizhny Novgorod Oblast
- Grebnevo, Ryazan Oblast, a selo in Grebnevsky Rural Okrug of Starozhilovsky District of Ryazan Oblast
