= Rukomysh =

Rukomysh Рукомиш
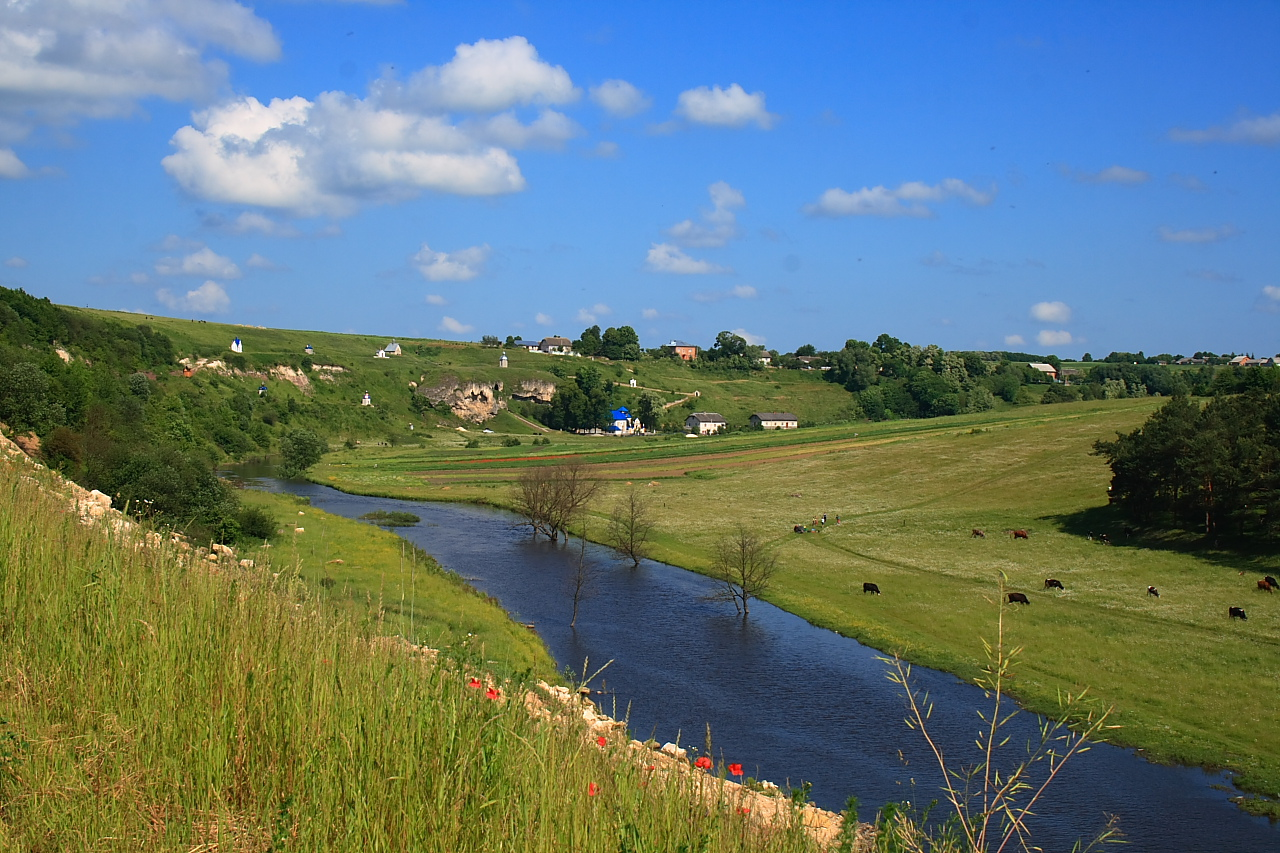
- Interactive map of Rukomysh
- Coordinates: 49°05′59″N 25°22′52″E
- Country: Ukraine
- Oblast: Ternopil Oblast
- Raion: Chortkiv Raion

Area
  - Total: 0.980 km^{2} (0.378 sq mi)

Population (2001 census)
  - Total: 427
- Time zone: UTC+2 (EET)
  - Summer (DST): UTC+3 (EEST)
- Postal code: 48420
- Area code: +380 3544

Rukomysh (Ukrainian: Рукомиш) is a village in Chortkiv Raion (district) of Ternopil Oblast (province) in western Ukraine. It belongs to Buchach urban hromada, one of the hromadas of Ukraine. The Strypa River flows near the eastern edge of the village.

== History ==
First written mention comes from the 14th century, 1373 or 1379. Then Rukomysh belonged to the Kingdom of Poland, from 1569 to the Polish–Lithuanian Commonwealth. from 1772 until 1918 to Austrian empires, in 1918-1919 to West Ukrainian People's Republic. The first known owner of village was Polish nobleman Michał Awdaniec, representative of the House of Buczacki.

Reading room of Ukrainian society Prosvita operated in the village.

Until 18 July 2020, Rukomysh belonged to Buchach Raion. The raion was abolished in July 2020 as part of the administrative reform of Ukraine, which reduced the number of raions of Ternopil Oblast to three. The area of Buchach Raion was merged into Chortkiv Raion.

== Attractions ==
- Church and statue of St. Onuphrius
- Cave temple
- 2 chapels
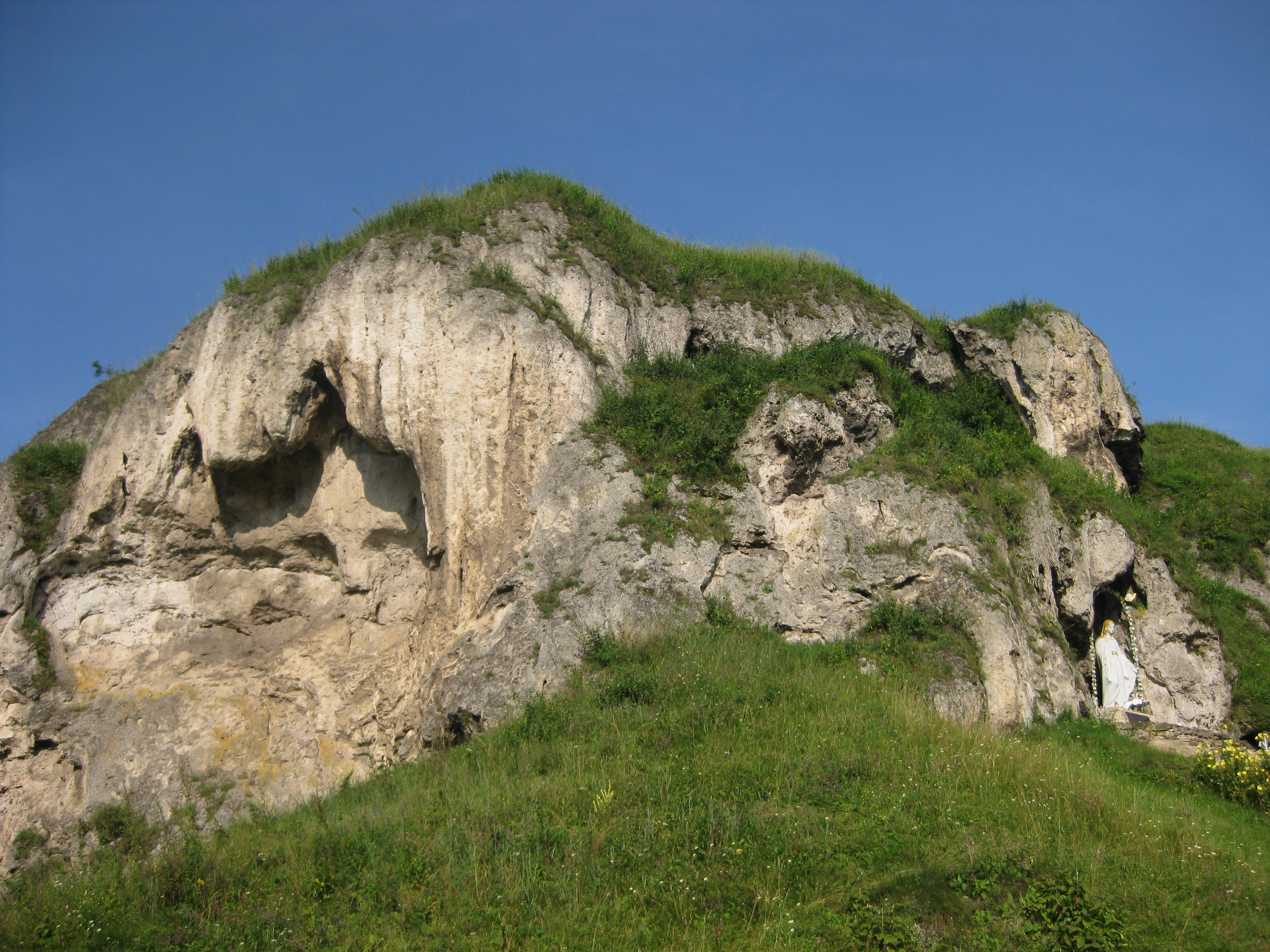

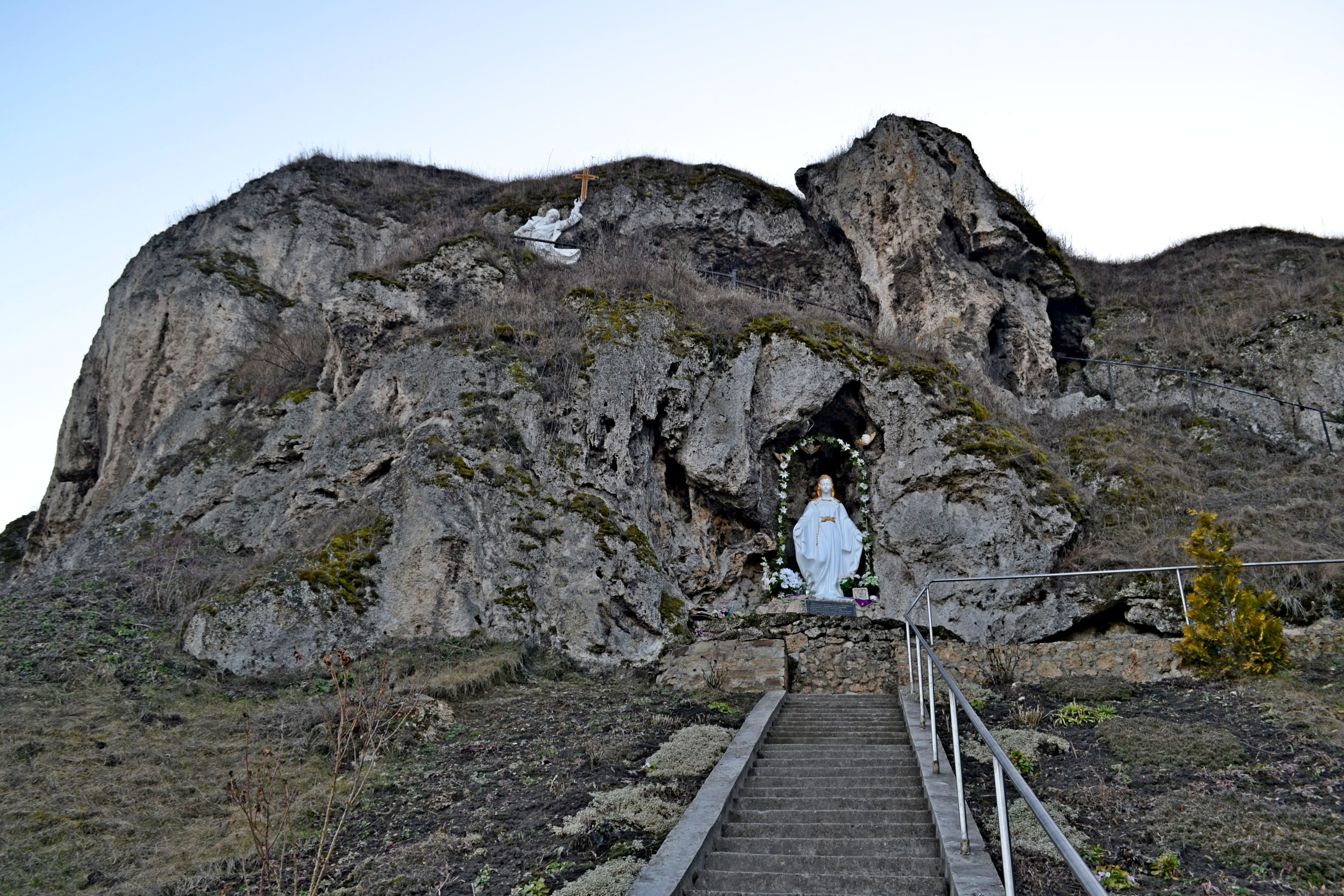

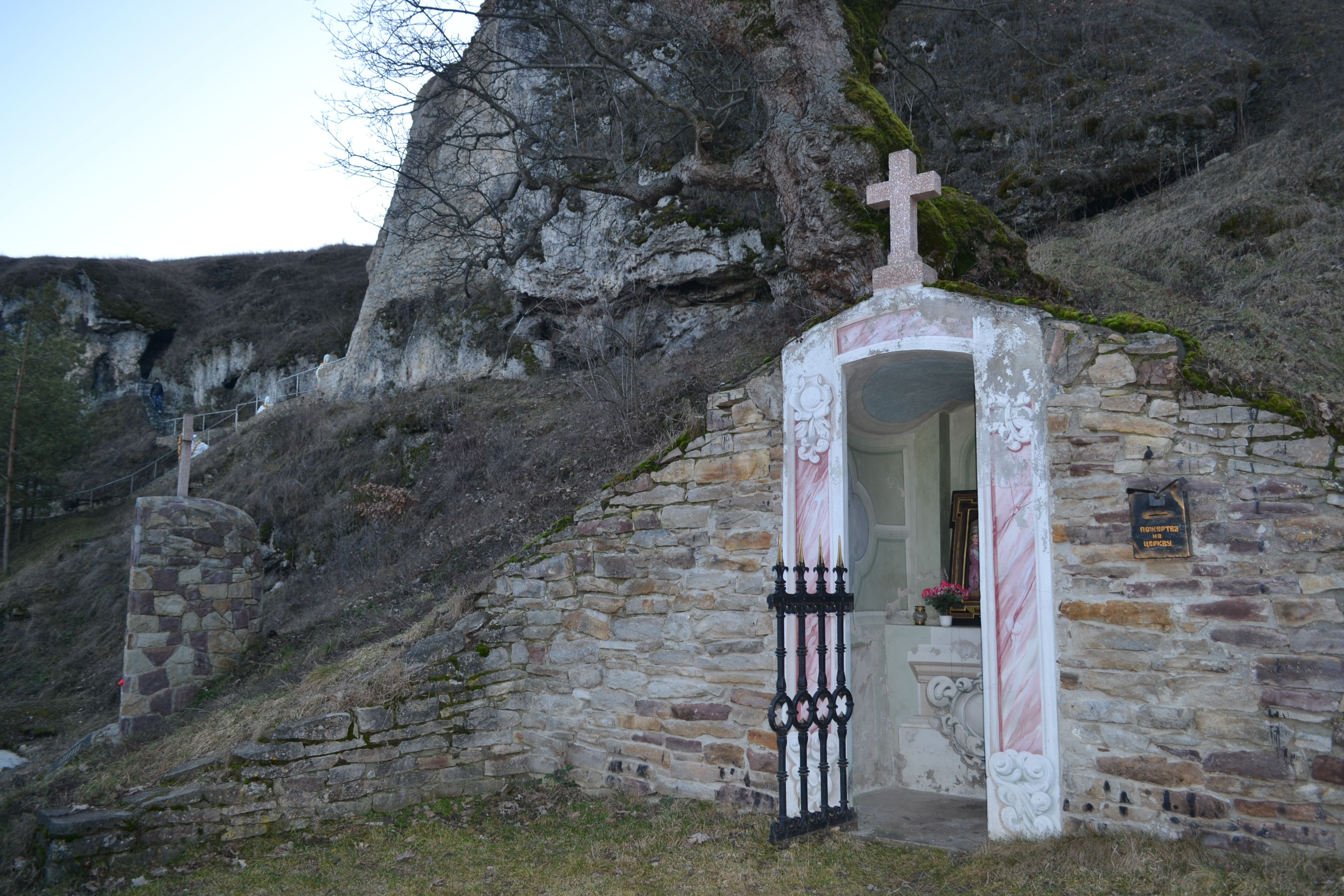

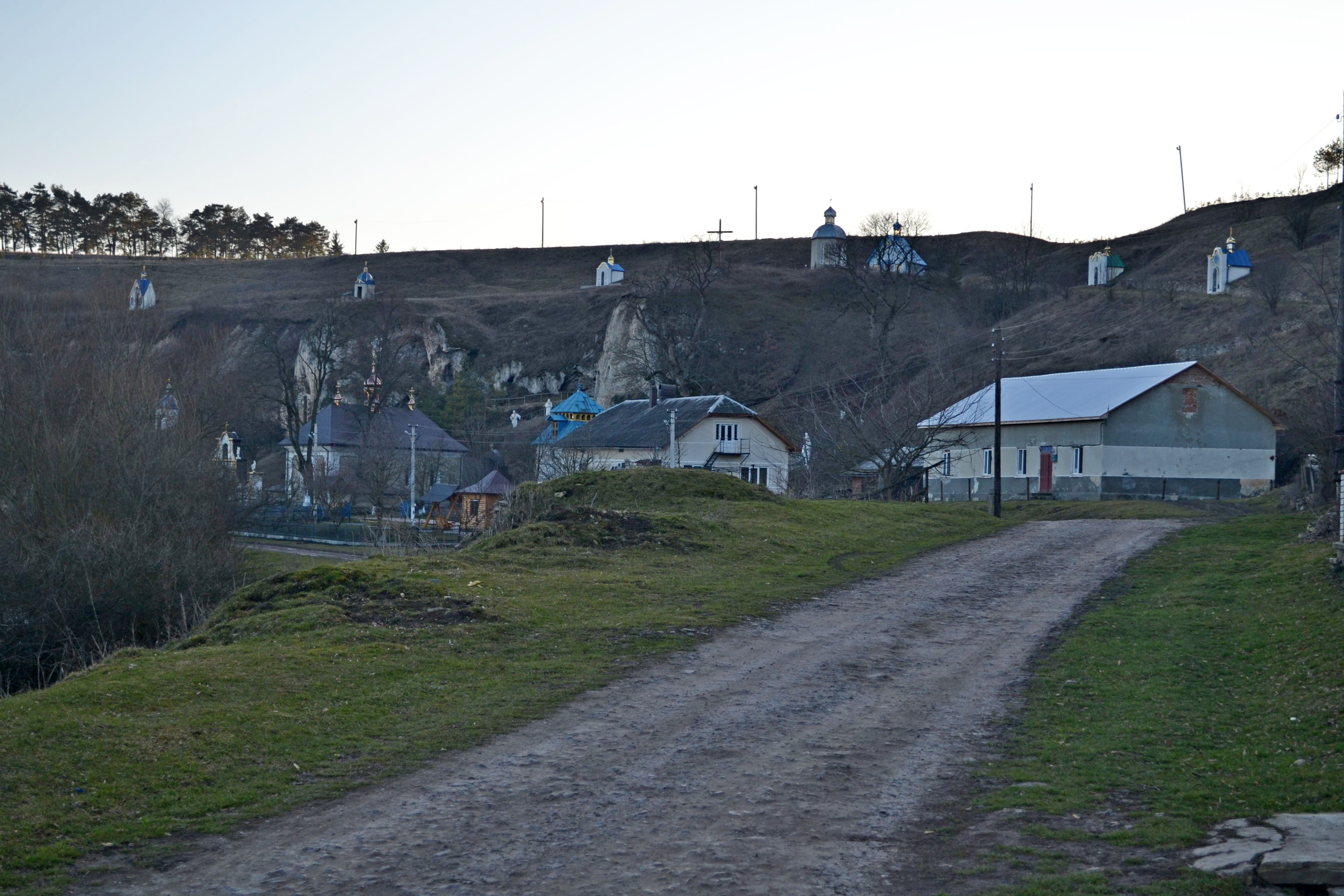
