= Ellina Grigorieva =

Russian mathematician and mathematics educator

Ellina Grigorieva is a Russian mathematician and mathematics educator known for her books on mathematical problem solving. She is a professor in the Texas Woman's University Department of Mathematics and Computer Science, and an expert on control theory and its applications to the spread of disease.

== Education and career ==
Grigorieva was born in Moscow, and educated at Moscow State University.

== Books ==
Grigorieva's problem-solving books include:

- Methods of Solving Number Theory Problems (Birkhäuser, 2018)
- Methods of Solving Sequence and Series Problems (Birkhäuser, 2016)
- Methods of Solving Nonstandard Problems (Birkhäuser, 2015)
- Methods of Solving Complex Geometry Problems (Birkhäuser, 2013)
