= Dmitry Grigoryev (businessman) =

Russian businessman (born 1975)

Dmitry Grigoriyev
- Дмитрий Григорьев
- Born: 29 July 1975 (age 50); Alma-Ata, Kazakh SSR, Soviet Union
- Occupation: Businessman
- Spouse: Elvina Grigoriyeva (m. 2007)
- Children: 4

Dmitry Mikhailovich Grigoriyev (Russian: Дмитрий Михайлович Григорьев; born 29 July 1975) is a Kazakh businessman. Grigoriyev is the former Chief Financial Officer of The Rompetrol Group (currently KazMunayGas International NV), a Romanian oil company, that operates in many countries around the world.

== Early life and education ==
Dmitry Grigoriev was born in Almaty, Kazakhstan, to a Russian family.

At 17, he enrolled in the Kazakh State Academy of Management and graduated with a Diploma of Excellence, specialized in monetary and financial relations. In 1996, Grigoriyev attended SDA Bocconi School of Management. He graduated in 1998 with a Master of Business Administration. Additionally he followed specialized courses on mergers and acquisitions held internationally.

He began his career as the Executive Director of the Construction company "EAST Engineering" and continued at financial and banking institutions in Kazakhstan.

In 1998, his career evolved internationally, Grigoriyev moved to London, UK in order to undertake his new position as Manager-coordinator at Аlcam International. Further, he held the position of Manager of Business Development at AONET spa in Milan, Italy.

In 2003, he returned to Kazakhstan to continue his career as the Deputy Manager of the Department for Import and Substitution in Major Oil and Gas Projects at KazMunaiGas. Further, Grigoriyev undertook the position of the Deputy Manager of Export Department at Trade House KazMunaiGas.

== The Rompetrol Group ==
In August 2007, the Kazakh company KazMunayGas acquired 75% of The Rompetrol Group share and along with other specialists, Dmitriy Grigoriyev was invited to undertake the position of the Deputy Financial Manager of the Group. In July 2009 KazMunayGas acquired 100% of The Rompetrol Group and he was appointed Group Chief Financial Officer of the Group.

== Personal life ==
In 2005, Grigoryev married Elvina Grigoryeva and together they have four children: Domenika, Raffaella, Leonardo, Michelangelo.

== Notes ==
- Roxana Petrescu, "Dmitry Grigoryev, CFO al Rompetrol: Am terminat cu ştirile negative. Vom atinge pragul de rentabilitate în 2012", http://www.zf.ro/companii/dmitry-grigoryev-cfo-al-rompetrol-am-terminat-cu-stirile-negative-vom-atinge-pragul-de-rentabilitate-in-2012-8079202, 20.03.2011;
- Irina Popescu, "Rompetrol doesn’t owe the Romanian state “a penny”, says CFO Grigoryev", http://www.romania-insider.com/rompetrol-doesnt-owe-the-romanian-state-a-penny-says-cfo-grigoryev/28788/, 19.06.2011;
- Adrian Negrescu, "Rompetrol, povestea unei afaceri de succes marca Patriciu: Statul roman isi cauta dreptatea in Kazahstan", http://www.dailybusiness.ro/stiri-companii/rompetrol-povestea-unei-afaceri-de-succes-marca-patriciu-statul-roman-isi-cauta-dreptatea-in-kazahstan-47958/, 26.08.2010;
