= Bernard Meretyn =

Bernard Meretyn (German: Bernhard Meretyn, also Bernard Merettiner, born near or at the end of the 17th century – January 3 or January 4, 1759) was an architect of the late Baroque and rococo of German origin. He worked in Galicja, which in the 18th century was part of the Kingdom of Poland. In particular, he worked in Lviv (St. George's Cathedral, Lviv), Buchach (Buchach townhall), Vynnyky.

According to Ukrainian researcher Volodymyr Vujcyk by analysing multiple signatures architect used as: Meretynier Bernat architectus, Meretync, Meredyn, Merettyn, Mirydyn, Mertynier, Merderer, Bernadt architecto, Bernat, Bennard, Merettini, Meretyn, he was able to identify his original German surname was Merettiner.

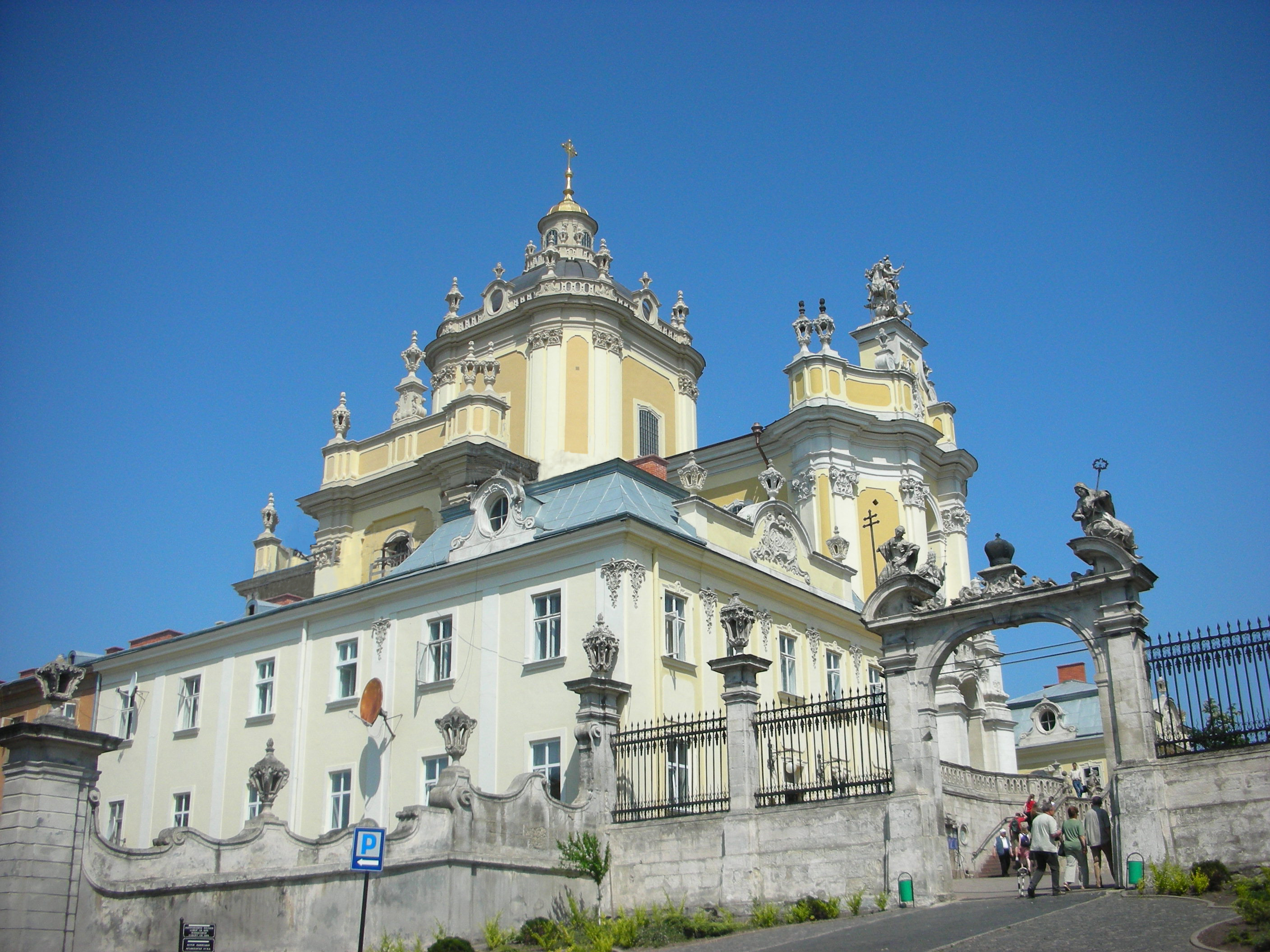
St. George's Cathedral, Lviv (1746-1764)

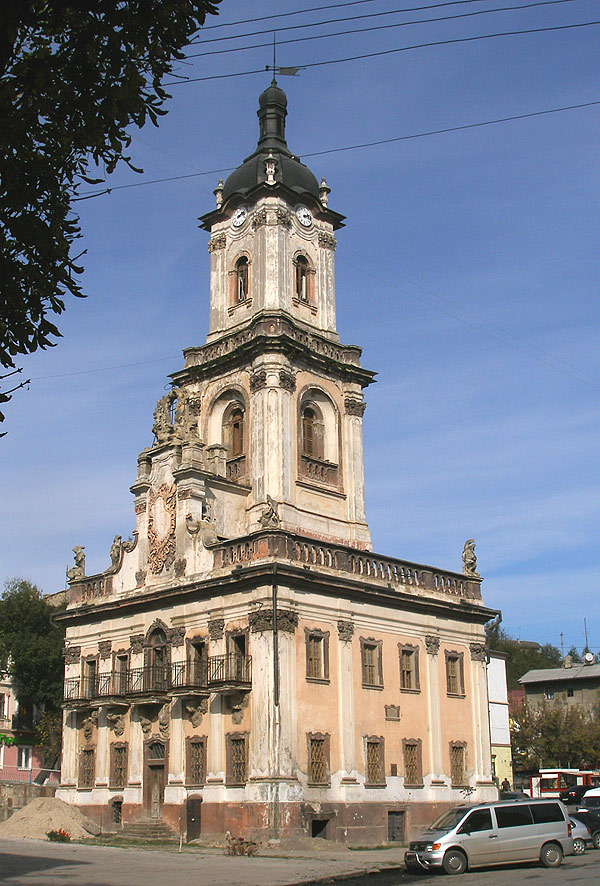
Buchach townhall (1750-1751)

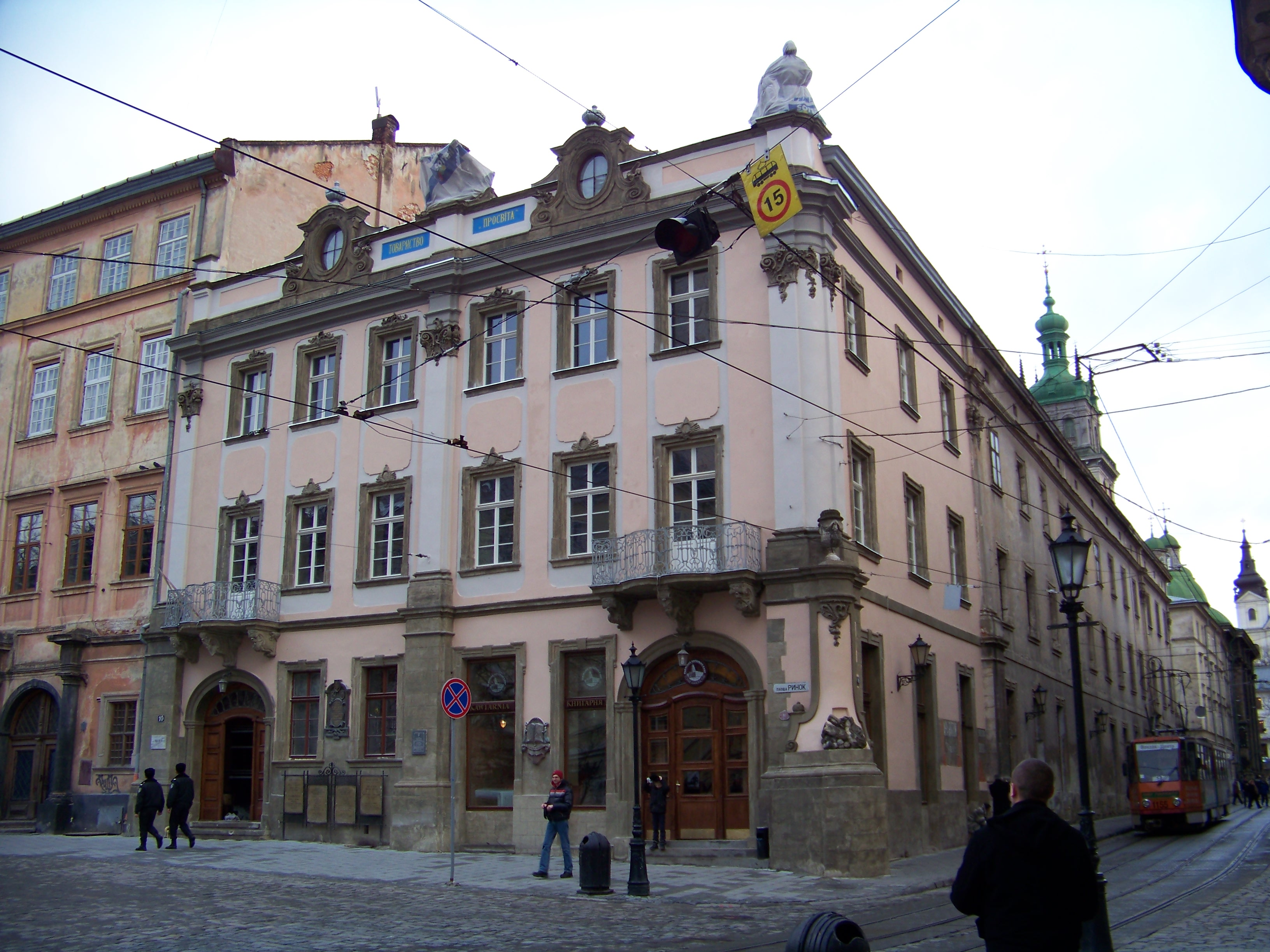
Lubomirski Palace

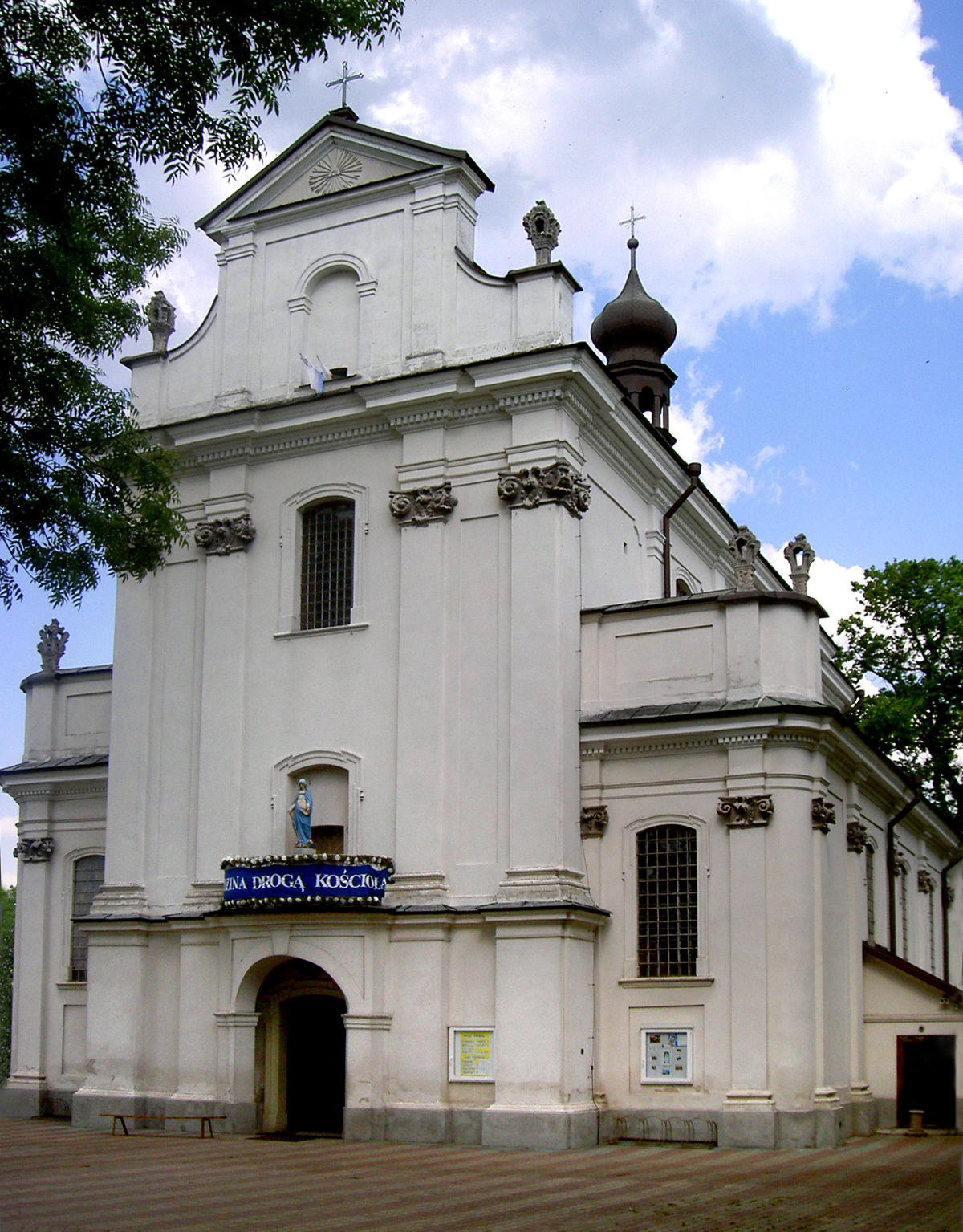
Tarnogród

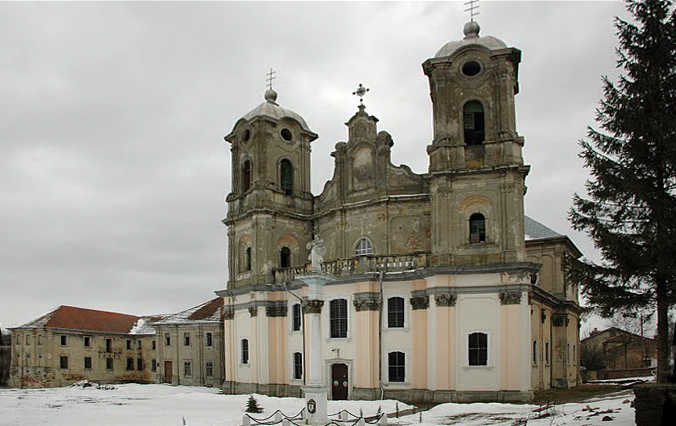
Horodenka

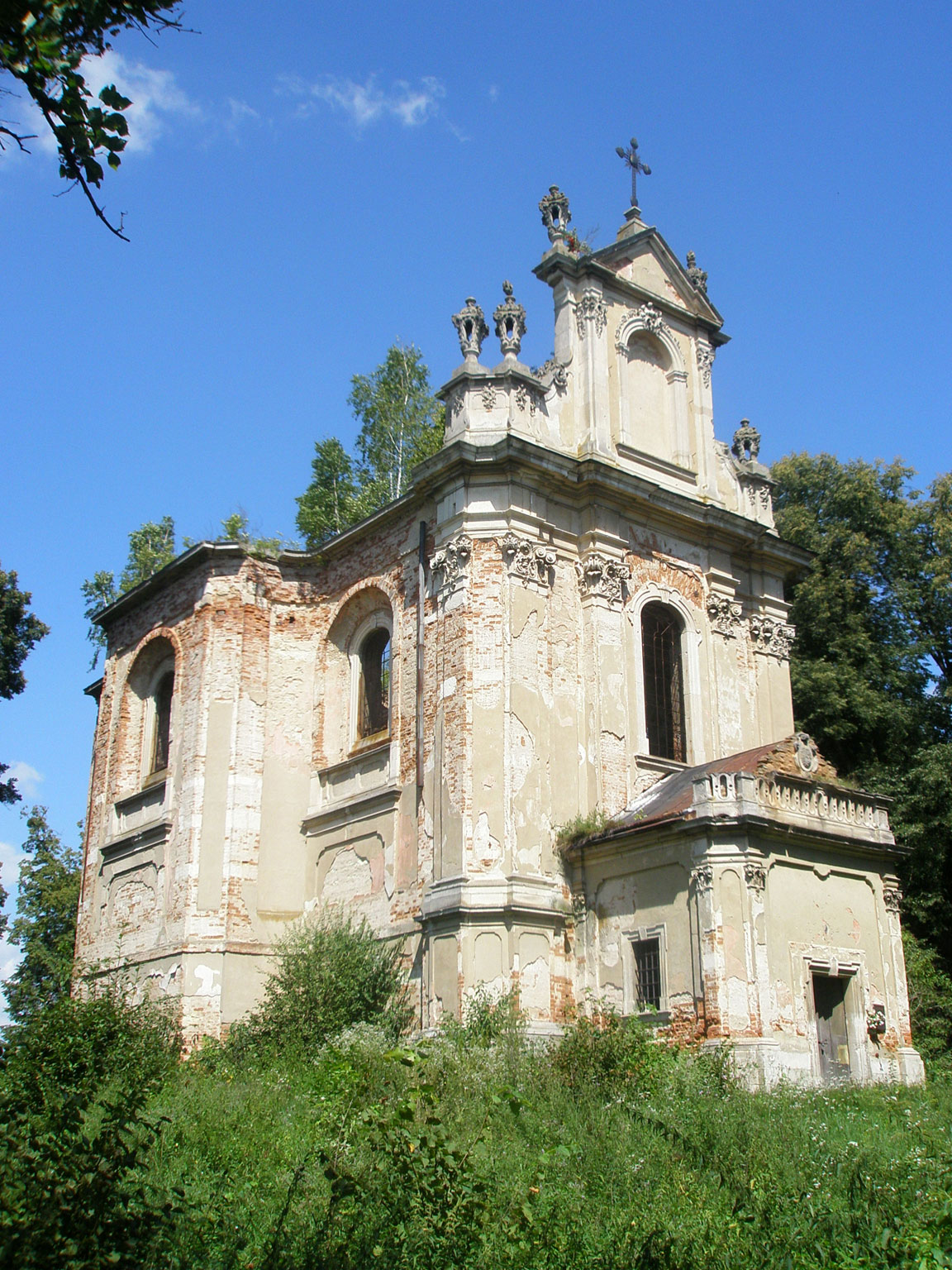
Hodovytsia

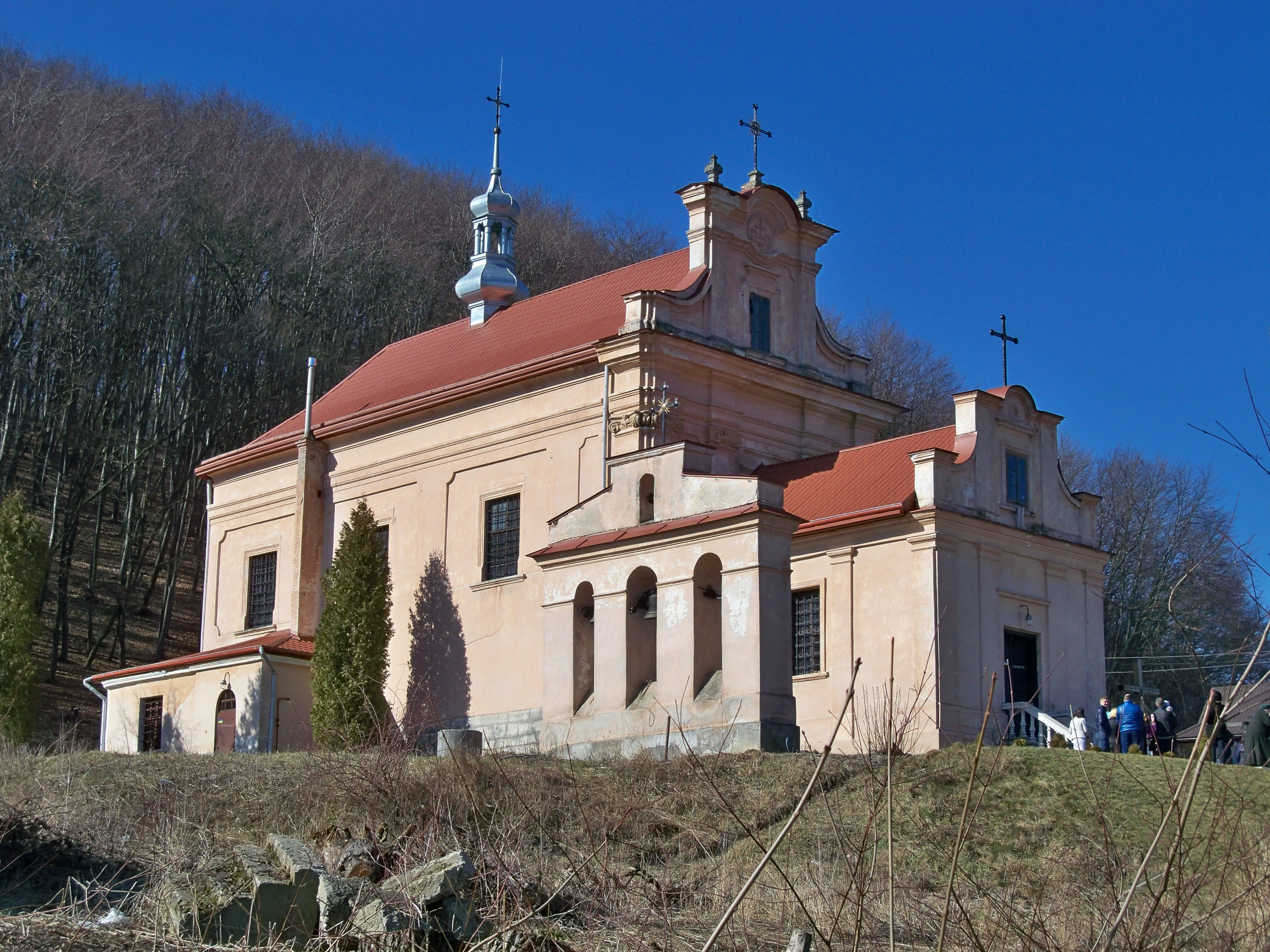
Vynnyky

== Sources ==
- Zbigniew Hornung. Merenyn Bernard (zm. 1759) // Polski Słownik Biograficzny.— Wrocław — Warszawa — Kraków — Gdańsk, 1978.— t. ХХ/3, zeszyt 86.— 409–616 s.— S. 442-444.
- Bernard Meretyn - biography
