= Church of the Precious and Life-Giving Cross, Buchach =

Ukrainian church in Buchach, Ukraine

Church of the Precious and Life-Giving Cross
- Церква Чесного і животворящого Хреста
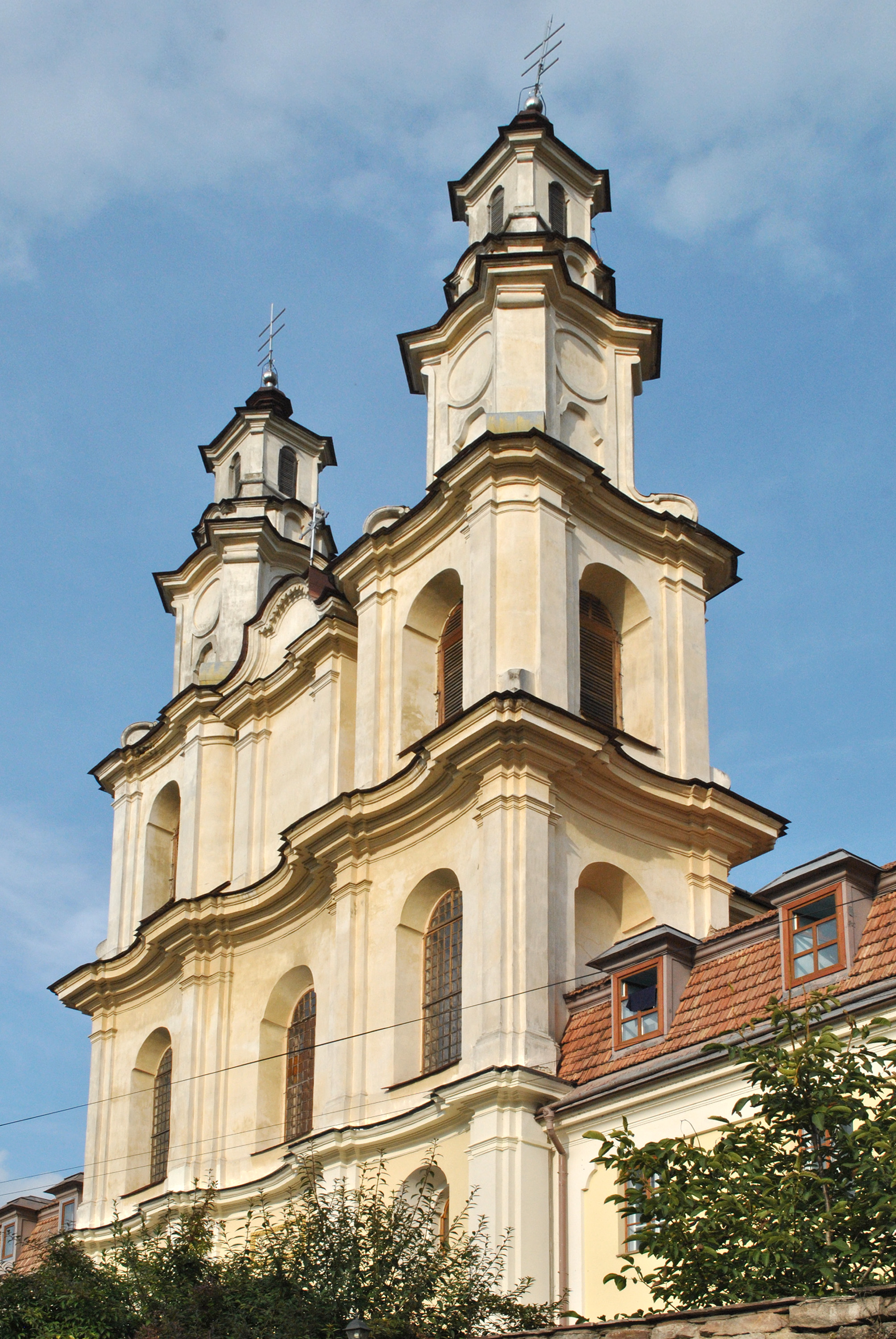

- Location within Ternopil Oblast
- 49°03′37″N 25°23′48″E
- Location: Buchach
- Country: Ukraine
- Denomination: Catholic Church
- Sui iuris church: Ukrainian Greek Catholic Church

History
- Dedication: True Cross
- Consecrated: 18 September 1771

Architecture
- Architect: Gotfryd Hoffman
- Style: Baroque
- Groundbreaking: 1761 or 1765
- Closed: temporarily during Soviet rule

Administration
- Archdiocese: Ternopil–Zboriv
- Diocese: Buchach

Immovable Monument of National Significance of Ukraine
- Official name: Василіанська церква та келії (Basilian Church and cells)
- Type: Architecture
- Reference no.: 190075/1

Church of the Precious and Life-Giving Cross (Ukrainian: Церква Чесного і животворящого Хреста) is a Greek rite Catholic church in Buchach (Ternopil Oblast). It is part of the complex of buildings of the Buchach Monastery of the Order of Saint Basil the Great. Protection number 652/1, address — 19 Mitskevych Street. The founder was the owner of the city, Mikołaj Bazyli Potocki. The church is an architectural monument of national significance.

== History ==
The construction of the church began either between 1761 and 1765 on the initiative of the then abbot of the monastery, Jan Hieronim Nereziusz, or in 1770. Construction was completed in 1771, and the roof of the church was covered with sheet metal. The church was built on the site of the demolished Dominican Church of the Holy Cross, designed by architect Gotfryd Hoffman, a representative of the Vilnius Baroque style. The newly built church, named the Church of the Precious and Life-Giving Cross, was consecrated on 18 September 1771, with the permission of Metropolitan Leo Szeptycki, by Abbot Inokentii Mshanetskyi. The bell tower was built in 1849-1854.

Originally, one of the towers on the facade of the temple was intended for the installation of a bell, and the other for a clock.

The original paintings (frescoes) in the church were done by the Basilian painter Yakiv Holovatskyi (monastic name — Isychii). Marcin Twardowski, a Galician craftsman from Mykulyntsi, made some items (tabernacle, confessionals) for the church.

Mykhailo Filevych (who moved from Buchach to Chełm in 1777) created six wooden statues of saints for the Church of the Exaltation of the Holy Cross, which are now kept in the Andrey Sheptytsky National Museum of Lviv. Dmytro Krvavych claimed that he made them in Chełm. They ended up in Buchach, but were not used for their intended purpose — instead, they found their way into the collection of the National Museum. He also claimed that their style is similar to the four statues of the main altar of the Church of the Intercession in Buchach.

In 1777, the dean of the Roman Catholic Church in Buchach, parish priest of Petlykivtsi, priest Jan Engelt, donated two holy water fonts to the church, which were located near the pillars supporting the choir loft. On 16 February 1778, M.V. Potocki arrived in the city and received a "reverse" from the rector of the gymnasium for 20,000 zlotys, which the founder recorded for the manufacture of altars for the church.

For some time, the church housed the Pochaiv Gospel, published in 1771.

On 29 July 1865, a major fire in the city severely damaged the church and burned down the library. The artist Shlegel was commissioned by Rector Modest Hnatevych to create a lithograph, which was lithographed by Wurm in Vienna in 1865.

In the grotto of the stone gallery in front of the church, there is a statue of Saint Onuphrius the Great.

After the opening of the Basilian monastery, whose activities had been banned by the Soviets, the Buchach School of Agricultural Mechanization (now the Buchach Vocational and Technical School) converted the church into a teaching building and housed a grain harvester there.

== Present ==
There is a church choir, led by Mariia Kryvko, Merited Worker of Culture of Ukraine.

== Description ==
The church has a cruciform plan, a single nave, and a developed transept.

Jerzy Kowalczyk (art historian) considers the presence of two towers on the facade of the church to be a sign of the Latinization of Basilian architecture.

== Bibliography ==
- Бучач і Бучаччина. Історично-мемуарний збірник / ред. колегія Михайло Островерха та інші. — Ню Йорк — Лондон — Париж — Сидней — Торонто : НТШ, Український архів, 1972. — Т. XXVII. — 944 с. — іл.
- (in Ukrainian) Дуда І., Оверко О., Бучач // Ternopil Encyclopedic Dictionary: in 4 v. / editorial board: H. Yavorskyi and other, Ternopil: "Zbruch", 2004, V. 1: А—Й, S. 211—213. — ISBN 966-528-197-6.
- Станкевич М. Бучач та околиці. Маленькі образки. — Львів : СКІМ, 2010. — 256 с., іл. — ISBN 966-95709-0-4.
- (in Ukrainian) Стоцький Я., Бучацький монастир Отців Василіян Чесного Хреста Господнього // Ternopil Encyclopedic Dictionary: in 4 v. / editorial board: H. Yavorskyi and other, Ternopil: "Zbruch", 2004, V. 1: А—Й, S. 209. — ISBN 966-528-197-6.
- Стоцький Я. Монастир Отців Василіян Чесного Хреста Господнього в Бучачі (1712—1996 рр.). — Львів : Місіонер, 1997. — 160 с., іл. — ISBN 978-966-7086-24-4.
- Barącz S. Pamiątki buczackie. — Lwów : Drukarnia «Gazety narodowej», 1882. — 168 s.
