= Stefan Aleksander Potocki =

- Coat of arms of the Pilawa clan
- Coat of arms: Clan Pilawa
- Born: c. 1662
- Died: 1726 or 1727; Horodenka
- Buried: Pidkamin
- Noble family: Potocki
- Spouses: Anna Charleńska; Joanna Sieniawska
- Issue: by Joanna Sieniawska: Teofila; Magdalena; Teresa; Mikołaj Bazyli
- Father: Jan Potocki
- Mother: Teresa Cetner

Stefan Aleksander Potocki (born c. 1662; died 1726 or 1727), was a Polish nobleman, the voivode of Belz. With his second wife Joanna Sieniawska, he founded a UGCC Basilian monastery in Buchach in Lublin, on December 7, 1712. Owner of Buchach Castle.

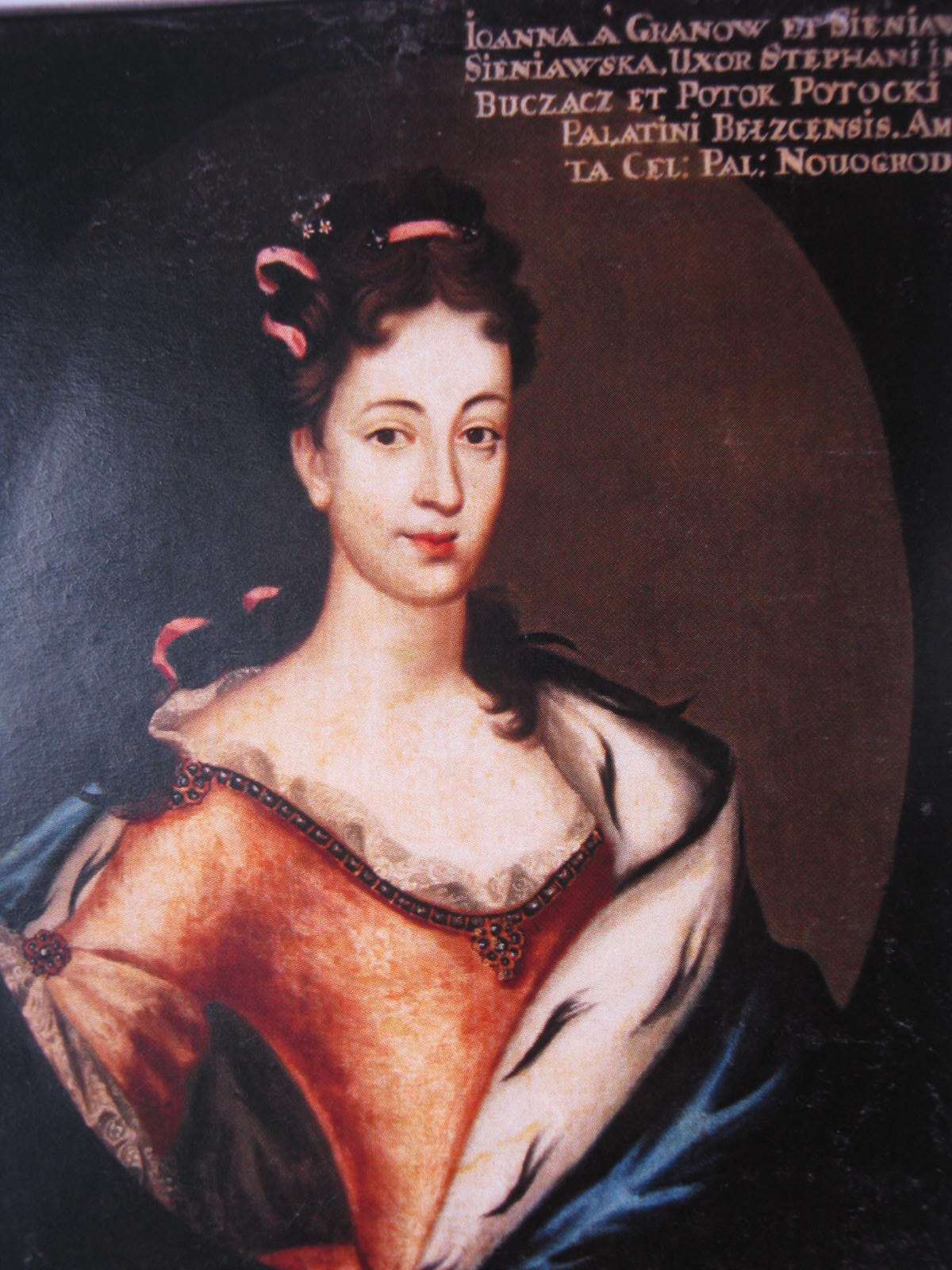
Potocki's second wife Joanna Sieniawska

His father was Jan Potocki and his mother was Teresa Cetner, daughter of a Halicz castellan.

His body was buried in the Dominican (now UGCC) monastery in Pidkamin.

His son Mikołaj Bazyli Potocki became the Starost of Bohuslav and Kaniv, benefactor of the Buchach townhall, Pochayiv Lavra, and Dominican Church in Lviv, and a deputy in the Sejm.

== Biography ==
He began his military career as a colonel in the Crown Army. In 1688 he became Great Crown Hunter. In 1694, he severely beat his brother-in-law, the voivode of Bratslav, Jan Gniński (son of Deputy Chancellor Jan Krzysztof Gniński), for which King Jan III Sobieski later accepted an apology. In July of the same year, he decided to marry Joanna Sieniawska, daughter of Mikołaj Hieronim Sieniawski. The wedding took place on January 2, 1695. Her brother Adam Sieniawski was against it, suspecting that Potocki was only interested in his sister's large dowry. Immediately after the wedding in February 1695, Potocki went to Lviv, which was besieged by the Tartars. During the siege, he was severely wounded in the shoulder. He collected information about the events in Jassy, Crimea and Budziak.

He was a part of the Great Crown Guard in the years 1692–1697. He was a member of the Halicz sejmik for the sejm of 1685 and the extraordinary sejm of 1688–1689, and a member of the Podolian sejmik at the convocation sejm of 1696. After the broken convocation sejm of 1696, he joined the general confederation on September 28, 1696. He was a member of the sejm of 1701 and the sejm of 1701–1702 from Halicz. On August 19, 1703, Potocki issued a list of laws for the Shoemaker's Guild in Potok Złoty. Two years later, in September 1705, he prevented the Tsar's army from entering the Zamość Fortress.

He was a member of the Sandomierz Confederation in 1704.

Together with his wife Joanna, he founded a Basilian monastery in Buchach. In this city, on the right bank of the Strypa, he built a modern-style palace with two annexes. At the beginning of the 18th century, he brought several dozen Armenian families to Horodenka, and in 1707 founded for them an Armenian church, the Immaculate Conception of the Blessed Virgin Mary.

From 1717 he began to fall ill frequently. In 1718 he was awarded the Order of the White Eagle. He also held the office of voivode of Belz from 1720. He was the starost of Terebovlia and Kaniv in the territory of present-day Ukraine. From March 1726 he was seriously ill. According to priest and historian Sadok Barącz, Potocki died in the early morning of August 1, 1727, at the age of 65. A little later, Jerzy Sewer Dunin-Borkowski repeated August 1, 1727 as the date of death and added that Potocki died in Horodenka. Andrzej Link-Lenczowski claimed that Potocki died in 1726; this date was repeated by Tomasz Henryk Skrzypecki. He was buried without a funeral in the Cetner family crypt in the Monastery of the Holy Cross in Pidkamin. His entrails were placed in the tomb of St. Anna in the old parish church in Buchach.

== Sources ==
- Sadok Barącz. Pamiątki buczackie. — Lwów: Drukarnia «Gazety narodowej», 1882. — 168 s. (in Polish and Latin)
- Link-Lenczowski A. Potocki Stefan h. Piława (zm. 1726) // Polski Słownik Biograficzny. — Wrocław — Warszawa — Kraków — Gdańsk — Łódź: Zakład Narodowy Imienia Ossolińskich, Wydawnictwo Polskiej Akademii Nauk, 1985. — Tom XXVIII/2. — Zeszyt 117. — 177–368 s. — S. 177–180. (in Polish)
