= Pidkamin =

Rural locality in Lviv Oblast, Ukraine

Pidkamin Підкамінь
- Rural settlement
- Flag Coat of arms

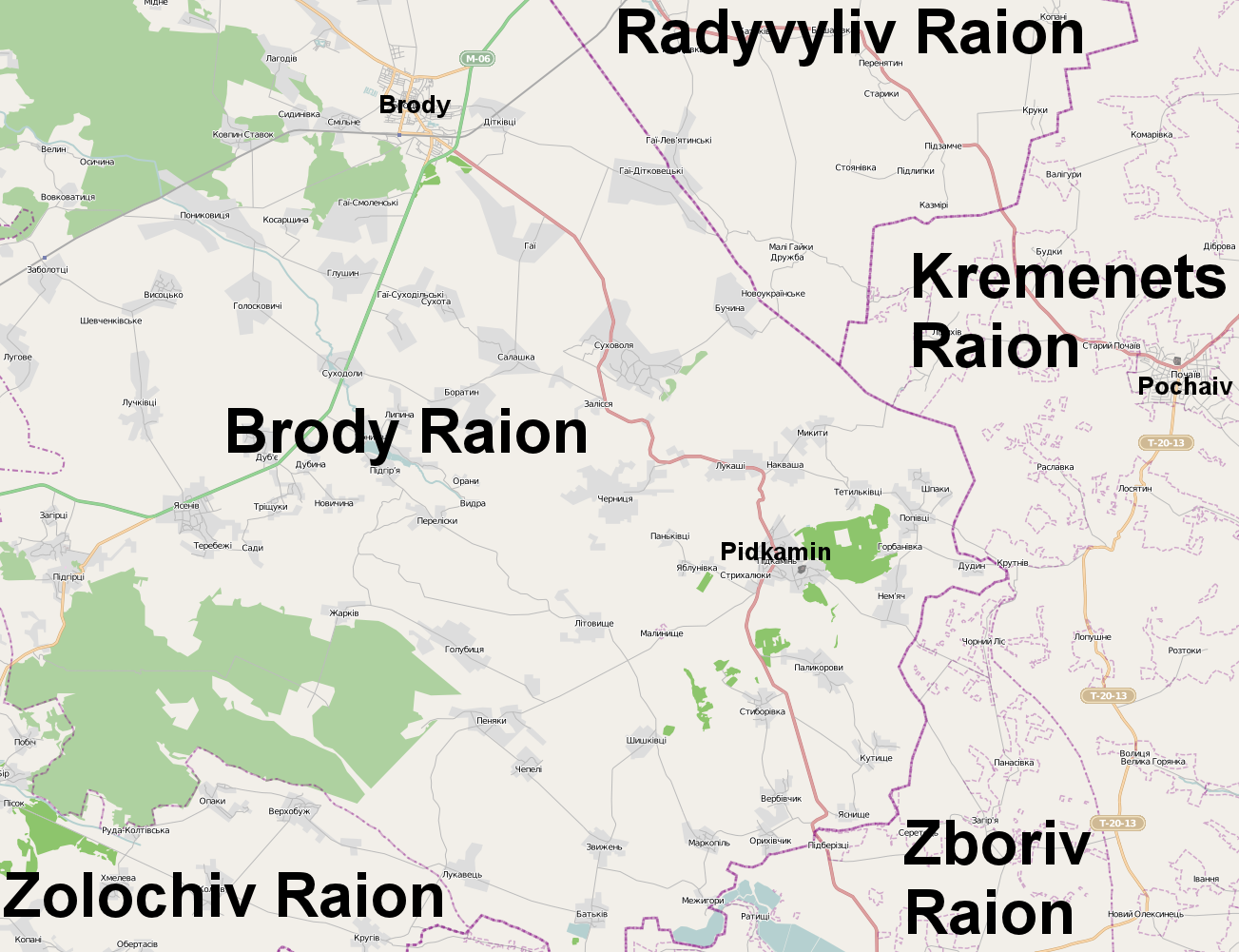
- Pidkamin and vicinity (before the 2020 administrative reform)

- Pidkamin in Lviv Oblast Pidkamin (Lviv Oblast)
- Coordinates: 49.945586°N 25.321155°E
- Country: Ukraine
- Oblast: Lviv Oblast
- Raion: Zolochiv Raion
- Hromada: Pidkamin settlement hromada
- First mentioned: 1441
- Named for: a local butte

Area
  - Total: 3.57 km^{2} (1.38 sq mi)

Population (2022)
  - Total: 1,895
- Area code: +380 3266

Pidkamin (Ukrainian: Підкамінь, lit. 'Below the Rock'; Polish: Podkamień) is a rural settlement in Zolochiv Raion, Lviv Oblast, western Ukraine, near the administrative border of three oblasts, Lviv, Rivne, and Ternopil. Pidkamin hosts the administration of Pidkamin settlement hromada, one of the hromadas (municipalities) of Ukraine. Population: 1,895 (2022 estimate).

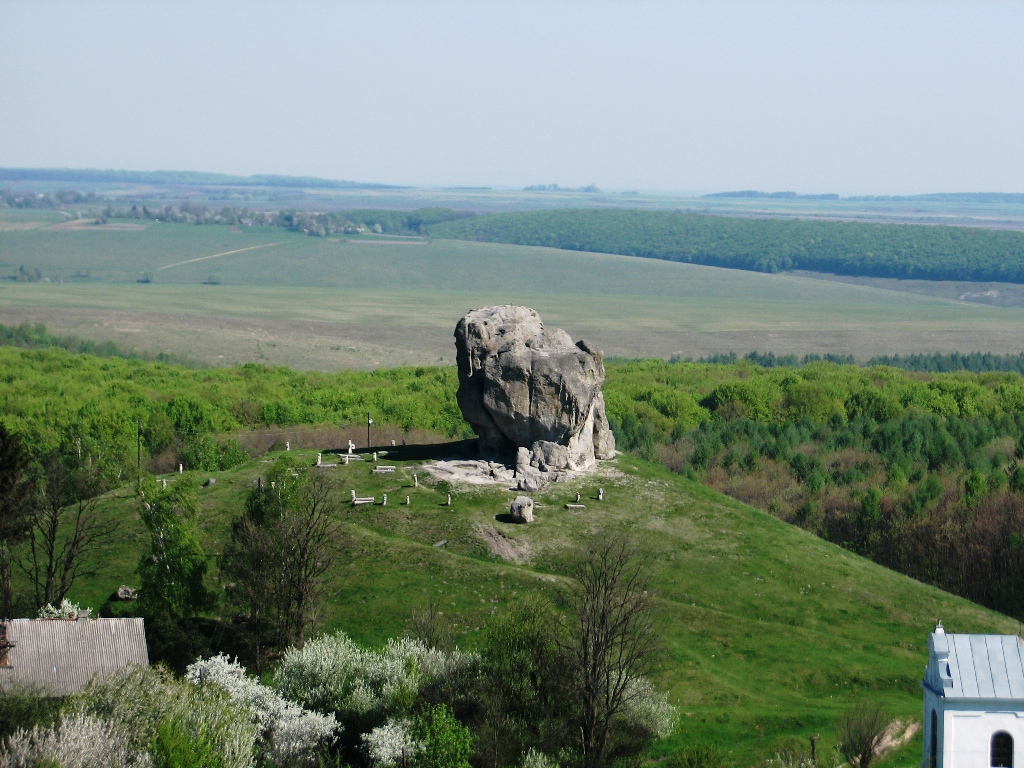
Rock of Pidkamin

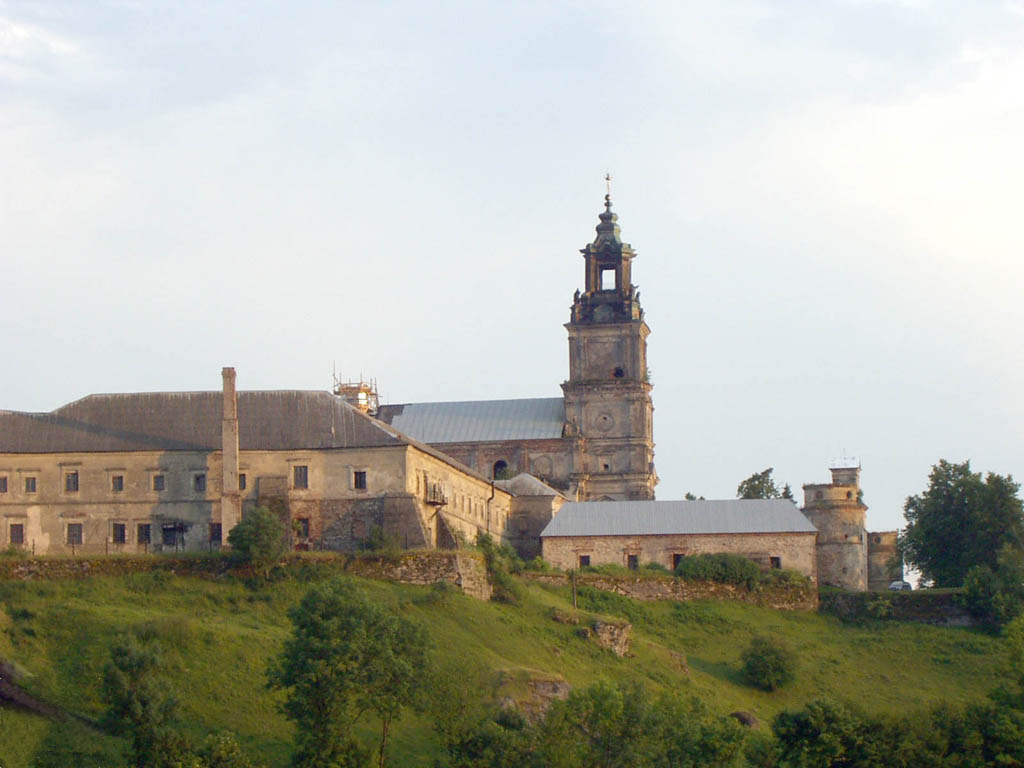
The Dominican Monastery today belongs to the Ukrainian Greek Catholic Church (till 2010)

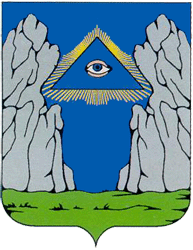
Polish coat of arms

== History ==
During the Massacres of Poles in Volhynia, Pidkamin was a shelter for Poles, who fled to its monastery. Some 2,000 people, mostly women and children, were living there when the monastery was attacked in mid-March 1944 by the Ukrainian Insurgent Army, cooperating with the Waffen SS. Around 300 Poles were murdered in the monastery, and additional 500 were killed in the town of Pidkamin itself. In the nearby village of Palikrovy, 300 Poles were killed, 20 in Maliniska and 16 in Chernytsia. Armed Ukrainian groups destroyed the monastery, stealing all valuables save for the monastery's crowned icon.

== Status ==
From 1940 to 1959 Pidkamin was an administrative center of Pidkamin Raion. Until 18 July 2020, it belonged to Brody Raion. The raion was abolished in July 2020 as part of the administrative reform of Ukraine, which reduced the number of raions of Lviv Oblast to seven. The area of Brody Raion was merged into Zolochiv Raion.

Pidkamin was designated an urban-type settlement until 26 January 2024, when this status was abolished and Pidkamin became a rural settlement.

== Jewish population ==
Pidkamin's Jewish population was murdered during the Holocaust under German Nazi occupation.

== Notable people ==
Petro Tsebrovsky, founder of Pidkamin and its monastery

- Leopold Buczkowski (1905–1989), Polish writer, artist.
- Stefan Aleksander Potocki (buried in Pidkamin), a voivode of Belz (1720-1726), a founder of the Basilian monastery in Buchach, father of Mikołaj Bazyli Potocki.
- Sadok Barącz, an ethnic Armenian Latin Church religious leader, historian, folklorist, archivist, and the prior of Pidkamin's Dominican Monastery.
