= Church of the Assumption, Buchach =

Church in Buchach, Ukraine

Church of the Assumption
- Костел Внебовзяття Пресвятої Діви Марії
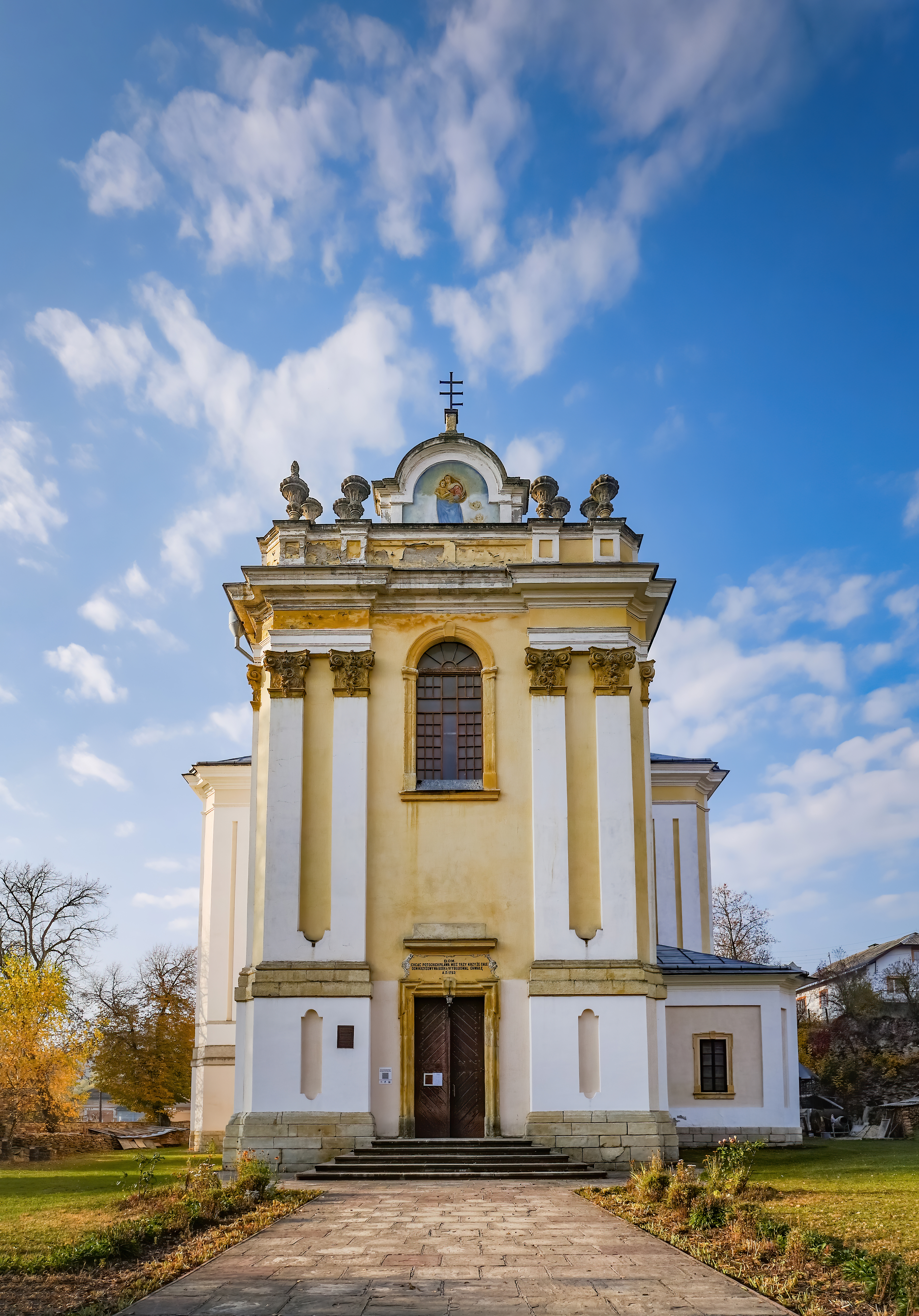

- Location within Ternopil Oblast

Religion
- Affiliation: Roman Catholic church

Location
- Location: Buchach
- Coordinates: 49°03′41″N 25°23′37″E

Immovable Monument of National Significance of Ukraine
- Official name: Костел (мур.) (Church (stone))
- Type: Architecture
- Reference no.: 190076

Church of the Assumption (Ukrainian: Костел Внебовзяття Пресвятої Діви Марії) is a historic Roman Catholic church located at 2 Mularska Street in Buchach, in the Chortkiv Raion of the Ternopil Oblast. It is an architectural monument of national significance.

== History ==
In 1373 or 1379, the owner of Buchach, Michał Awdaniec of Buchach, established a Roman Catholic parish. It was then that the first stone church was built, which was rebuilt many times.

On 21 March 1761, the owner of Buchach, Mikołaj Bazyli Potocki, founded a new parish church in the city. The currently existing church was built in the years 1761–1763 from the foundation of Mikołaj Bazyli Potocki, the Voivode of Belz and owner of the city (at least from 1733) and in the second half of the 18th century.

The architect is unknown. Zbigniew Hornung surmised that the actual creator of the design might have been Bernard Meretyn; or Marcin Urbanik used a copy of the design for the All Saints church in Hodovytsia, which is the prototype for the one in Buchach. Jan Ostrowski believed that the author of the church's design was a follower of Meretyn, presumably Marcin Urbanik.

On 14 August 1763, the Lviv Archbishop Wacław Hieronim Sierakowski consecrated the church and five altars. On 23 March 1890, during a service in the church, a statue of an angel fell on the head of a woman (Mrs. Mierzwińska, wife of the Buchach magistracy inspector and cashier), who later died as a result of the injuries sustained.

In June 1930, a commemorative plaque dedicated to the memory of students who perished during World War I and the 1920 war was unveiled in the church.

In 1945, following the expulsion of the Polish population, the Soviet authorities closed the church and established a hardware storehouse within it. A boiler room was set up in the crypt, and the bones of the Potocki family members resting in the crypt were profaned and thrown out of the church.

In 1991, the authorities of free Ukraine returned the destroyed church to the Catholics. On 24 August 1991, diocesan bishop Markijan Trofimiak re-consecrated the church.

In the 1990s, the temple was renovated. One of the main advocates and initiators of the renovation was the Polish parish priest of the Buchach parish, Prelate Ludwik Rutyna.

The parish priest Dariusz Piechnik. One of the former parish priests, Stanisław Gromnicki, was the deputy chairman of the Buchach branch of the District School Council in 1908, was awarded the Order of Franz Joseph, and was a papal prelate.

== Architecture, decor ==
The church is built of bricks on a cross-shaped plan. It is plastered on the outside. In the corners of the lowered narthex, there are winding stairs leading to the gallery (matroneum). The main facade is flanked by double pilasters with composite capitals, crowned with a semicircular tympanum, which contains a copy of Raphael Sistine Madonna, located in the Gemäldegalerie Alte Meister in Dresden. According to legend, the copy is the work of Edward Śmigły-Rydz. The entrance portal is located in the center. The portal features the inscription: "Chcąc Potockich Pilawa mieć trzy krzyże całe / Dom Krzyżowy na Boską wybudował chwałę" (Wishing for the Potocki Pilawa to have three complete crosses / A Cross House he built for God's glory).

Among the most valuable elements of the furnishing is the main altar, which reaches up to the presbytery vault. There are five altars in the church, including four side altars, one of which is thematically related to the life of the Virgin Mary.

Adam Bochnak attributed the design of the main altar to Piotr Polejowski based on its similarity to the altar in the Franciscan church in Przemyśl.

Jan K. Ostrowski surmised that the sculptural decoration of the church is the work of Pinsel's workshop, which included at least three carvers. The main figure was an anonymous collaborator of Johann Georg Pinsel (somewhat jokingly referred to by the researcher as "Pinsel's Friend", or "Amico di Pinsel"), [6] who most likely also created the large angel figures from the main altar in the church in Hodovytsia. The second person was a carver who created the figures in the side altars (also in the Church of the Intercession in Buchach). The third carver from Pinsel's workshop was most likely Anton Shtyl.

Andrzej Betlej believes that Maciej Polejowski was mistakenly credited in older literature with the structures of the side altars in the parish church in Buchach.

Jakub Sito attributes the sculptures from the St. Jude Thaddeus altar near the left chancel arch to Sebastian Fesinger and dates it to the years 1745–1750. It is worth noting that the face of the figure of the Guardian Angel from this altar is crafted very similarly to the physiognomy of the statuettes from the Jabłonowska epitaph in the Saints Peter and Paul Garrison Church in Lviv. Jan K. Ostrowski believed that the figures in this altar form a group that is significantly weaker and archaic in stylistic terms than the other sculptures in the church.

== Fate of the furnishings ==
=== Currently in Poland ===
- Gorzów Wielkopolski, cathedral: Icon Assumption of the Virgin Mary from the high altar;
- Oława, Church of Our Lady of Consolation: Icon St. Thaddeus, Icon St. Nicholas;
- Trzemeszno Lubuskie, parish church: Icon Virgin Mary with Child from the high altar (in the rectory), processional frames (feretrons), chalice.

=== Lost ===
- Liturgical vestments, banners (20 pcs.), canopies (2, 1 described as Turkish)

== Bibliography ==
- Sadok Barącz: Pamiątki buczackie. Lwów: Drukarnia Gazety Narodowej, 1882, s. 168.
- Jan K. Ostrowski: Kościół parafialny p. w. Wniebowzięcia Najświętszej Panny Marii w Buczaczu. W: Materiały do dziejów sztuki sakralnej na ziemiach wschodnich dawnej Rzeczypospolitej. Cz. I : Kościoły i klasztory rzymskokatolickie dawnego województwa ruskiego. T. 1. Kraków: Secesja, 1993, 126 s., 364 il., s. 15–28. ISBN 83-85739-09-2.
- Jan K. Ostrowski: Z problematyki warsztatowej i atrybucyjnej rzeźby lwowskiej w. XVIII. W: Sztuka Kresów Wschodnich: materiały sesji naukowej. T. 1. Kraków, 1994, s. 79–90. [dostęp 2017-01-30].
