= Jurman =

Jurman is a surname. Notable people with the surname include:

- Alicia Appleman-Jurman (1930–2017), Polish born Israeli–American memoirist
- Jason Jurman (1979–2014), American film, television, and theater actor
- Matthew Jurman (born 1989), Australian soccer player
