= Israel Elfenbein =

Israel Elfenbein (1890–1964) was an American rabbi and Talmudic scholar.

== Biography ==
Elfenbein was born in Buczacz, Eastern Galicia, and immigrated to the United States in 1906. Elfenbein was ordained at the Jewish Theological Seminary of New York in 1915. Between 1915 and 1940, he served as rabbi for congregations in Nashville, Chicago, and New York.

In 1938, Elfenbein became the executive director of the Mizrachi Education and Expansion Fund.

== Writing ==
Elfenbein specialized in medieval rabbinic literature and contributed to various scholarly periodicals and annuals. His notable works include Teshuvot Rashi (1943), a collection of responsa by Rashi, and Maimonides the Man (1946). A collection of his writings, titled American Synagogue as a Leavening Force in Jewish Life, was published posthumously in 1966, edited by A. Burstein.
