= Church of the Intercession, Buchach =

Ukrainian church in Buchach, Ukraine

Church of the Intercession
- Церква Покрови Пресвятої Богородиці
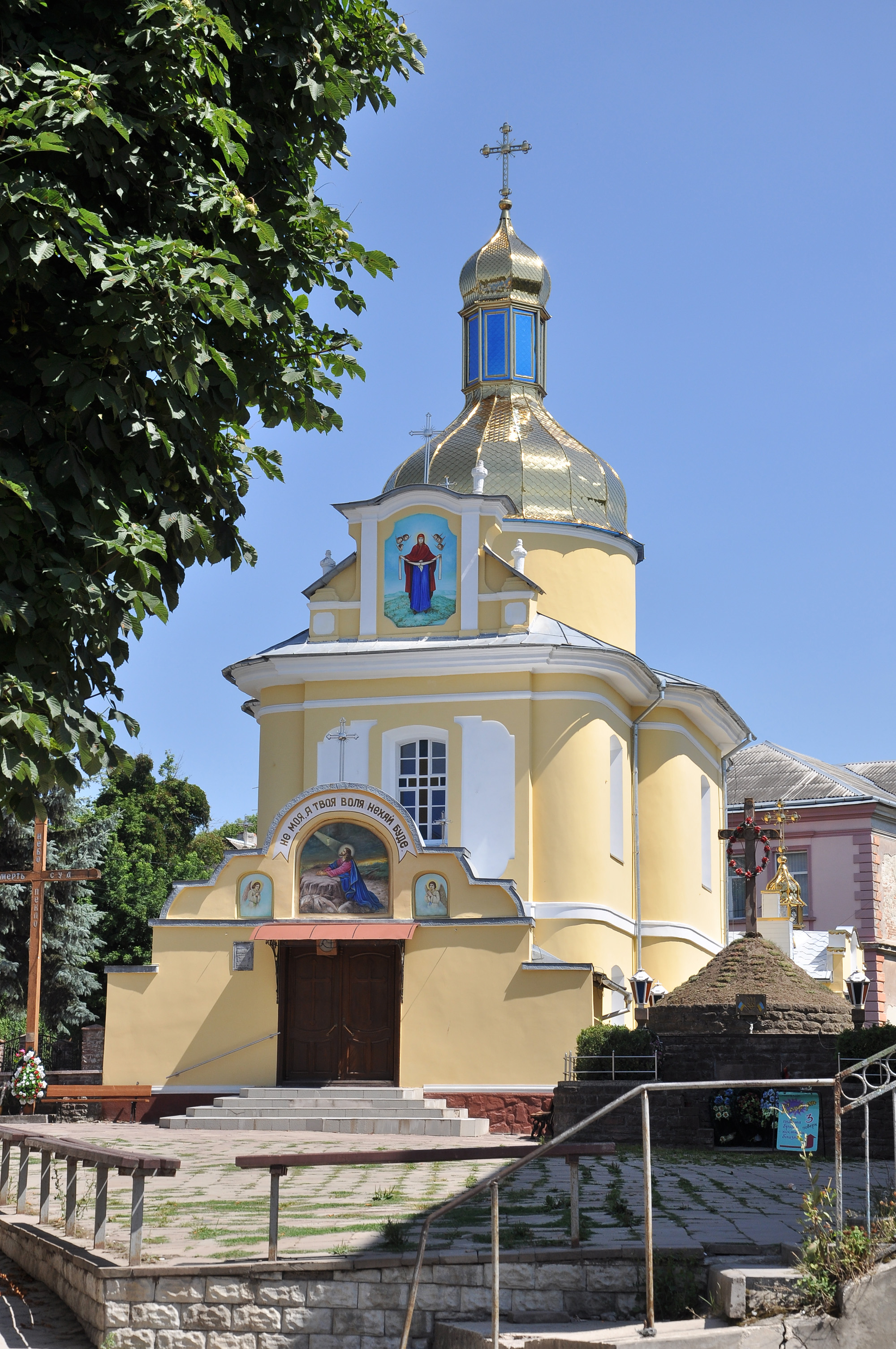

- Location within Ternopil Oblast

Location
- Location: Buchach
- Coordinates: 49°3′48″N 25°22′35″E

Immovable Monument of National Significance of Ukraine
- Official name: Покровська церква (мур.) (Intercession Church (stone))
- Type: Architecture
- Reference no.: 190073

Church of the Intercession (Ukrainian: Церква Покрови Пресвятої Богородиці) is a historic Greek Catholic parish church in the shape of a Greek cross in Buchach, in the Ternopil Oblast. It is an architectural monument of national significance.

== History ==
On 5 September 1755, the owner of Buchach, Mikołaj Bazyli Potocki, recorded a foundation for the church. His foundation was multiplied on 5 September 1784, by the subsequent owner of Buchach, Jan Potocki, starosta of Kaniv.

The present brick church (temple) was erected around 1755 or 1764 from the foundation of Mikołaj Bazyli Potocki. It was built next to the old wooden church (which already existed in 1708) in the former suburb of Buchach.

The church was destroyed by fire on 26 July or 29 July, 1865.

Polish scientist, dr. hab. Jan K. Ostrowski (currently the director of the Royal Wawel Castle) claimed that its architect was Szilcer, who, according to Sadok Barącz, was the commandant of the Stanislawów fortress and the builder of Armenian churches in Ivano-Frankivsk and Tysmenytsia. Ukrainian scientist Mykhailo Stankevych suggested that Bernard Meretyn might have been its architect.

Jan K. Ostrowski believed that the author of the figures in the church was an artist – one of the members of the Buchach workshop, who made the figures in the side altars of the Church of the Assumption in Buchach and, possibly, the deacon's doors (gates) of the iconostasis of the church. This researcher also assumed that Antoni Sztyl was probably the author of the figures of the main altar in the church.

Ukrainian researcher and sculptor Dmytro Krvavych believed that Mykhailo Filevych was the author of the figures in the main altar of the church. This researcher also agreed with the attribution that Franciszek Olędzki should be considered the author of the sculptures on the deacon's gates of the church's iconostasis. At the same time, Krvavych believed that Olędzki had implemented the design of Johann Georg Pinsel, who supervised its implementation.

The main altar has two interchangeable icons.

In 1990, during excavation work aimed at recovering bells from the basement of the Orthodox church, the remains of 148 people (including children) – victims of the NKVD – were found there. The victims were buried in a tomb next to the church.

== Bibliography ==
- Sadok Barącz: Pamiątki buczackie. Lwów: Drukarnia Gazety Narodowej, 1882, 168 s., s. 140-144. [dostęp 2016-12-13]
- Anna Sylvia Czyż, Bartłomiej Gutowski: Cmentarz miejski w Buczaczu. Warszawa: drukarnia Franczak (Bydgoszcz), 2009, 208 s., 118 il., seria: Zabytki kultury polskiej poza granicami kraju seria C, zeszyt 3. ISBN 978-83-60976-45-6.
- Adolf Władysław Inlender: Illustrirter Führer auf den k.k. Österr. Staatsbahnen für die Strecken...
- Михайло Станкевич: Бучач та околиці. Lwów: СКІМ, 2010, 256 s., іl. ISBN 966-95709-0-4.
- Оксана Чорній. 250-літній ювілей Покровецької святині. „Нова доба”, Buczacz, 27 (8545), 5 lipca 2013, s. 1, 4.
