= Mykola Bevz =

Ukrainian architect

Mykola Bevz (19 December 1954, Buchach) is a Ukrainian scientist, architect, member of ICOMOS from Ukraine.

Born in a family of teachers, Buchach farm-college (now — Buchach agrocollege of Podilsky State Agro-Techn. University (Kamianets-Podilskyi).

Graduated in Buchach sec. school (now - Volodymyr Hnatiuk Buchach gymnasium) in 1972, and graduated from Buchach children's art school (teacher — Omelian Mentus). 1972-1977 gg. studied at the Lviv Polytechnic Institute (LPI, now — National University "Lviv Polytechnic") at the Faculty of Architecture (teacher's specialty — Tetiana Maksym'yuk, Viktor Kravtsov). 1977-1978 worked as an architect in student design office at Lviv Polytechnic Institute (led by Vira Liaskovs'ka).

From 1978 to now has taught at the Lviv Polytechnic Institute, Faculty of Architecture, to 1992 worked as an assistant and senior lecturer of Urban Planning LPI. From 1992 works at the Department of Restoration and reconstruction of architectural complexes. May 2002 was elected Chair. Full member of the Ukrainian Committee of the International Council on Monuments and Cities, ICOMOS. In December 2003, he was elected vice-president of the Ukrainian Committee of ICOMOS. Vice President of supporters forts and palaces (Lviv). Member of the Scientific Society Shevchenko in the city Lviv. Member of the Society of fans of the city.

Co-Chair of Ukrainian-Polish Scientific Expedition (research, archaeological excavations in the territory of the present Basilica of the Birth of the Virgin Mary, the former Cathedral of the Nativity of the Blessed Virgin Mary) in Chełm.

== Sources ==
- Mykola Bevz. Lviv Polytechnic National University
- Колодницький С. Бевз Микола Валентинович // ТЕС 4 — С. 40. ukr.
- Інститут архітектури. Бевз Микола Валентинович ukr.
- Кафедра реставрації та реконструкції архітектурних комплексів (РРАК) ukr.
- Наукова діяльність кафедри реставрації та реконструкції архітектурних комплексів. ukr.
