= Buchach City Hall =

Coordinates: 49.0624°N 25.3948°E

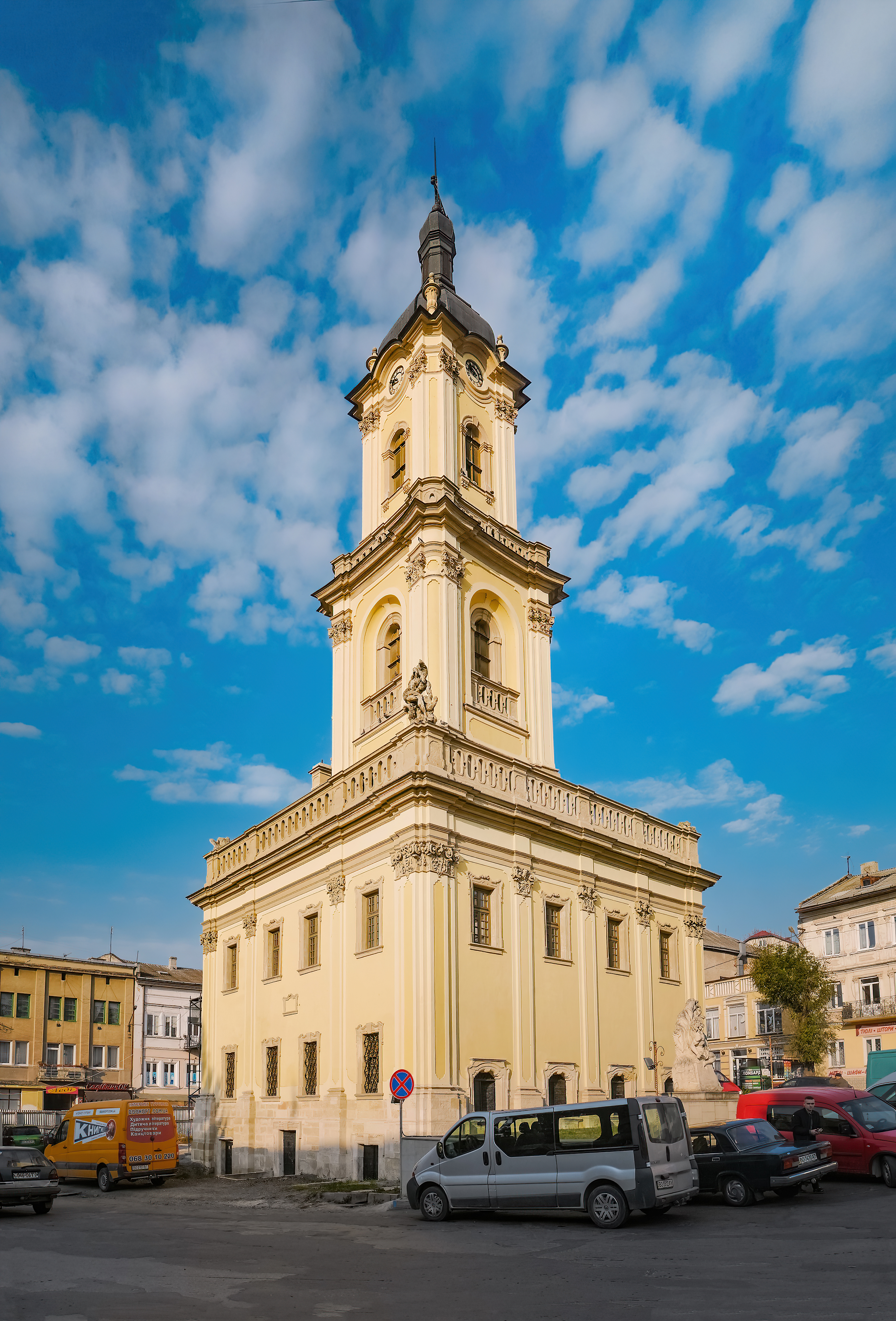

General information
- Estimated completion: ab. 1751

Design and construction
- Architects: Bernard Meretyn and sculptor Johann Georg Pinsel

Immovable Monument of National Significance of Ukraine
- Official name: Ратуша (мур.) (City Hall (stone))
- Type: Architecture
- Reference no.: 190078

Buchach City Hall, also known as the Buchach townhall, is a unique building of architectural significance dating to the mid-18th century in Buchach, Ternopil region, Ukraine. It was built in 1740-1750-th when the city belonged to the Crown of the Kingdom of Poland.

The founder of the cityhall was Mikołaj Bazyli Potocki — Starost of Kaniv, Korsun' and Bohuslav, benefactor of the Buchach's churches, Basilian monastery and Pochayiv Lavra. The building suffered significant damage during a 1811 fire where its spire burned and the height of the structure was reduced by 15 meters.

The architects and sculptors included Bernard Meretyn and Johann Georg Pinsel, whose has been called a Galician Michelangelo.
