= Mina Rosner =

Mina Rosner (1913–1997) was a native of Buczacz, Galicia, Austria-Hungary (now Buchach, Ukraine), who survived The Holocaust by hiding with a Polish family. After the war, she moved to Winnipeg, Manitoba, Canada, with her husband, Michael Rosner. She recorded her war-time experiences in her book I am a Witness. In 1990, she returned to Buchach for the first time since the war, and the visit was captured in a CBC documentary called "Return to Buchach". The documentary won a gold medal at the New York Film and Television Festival in 1992.
