= Bohdana Durda =

Ukrainian artist, writer, poet, and songwriter

Bohdana Yosypivna Durda Богдана Йосипівна Ду́рда
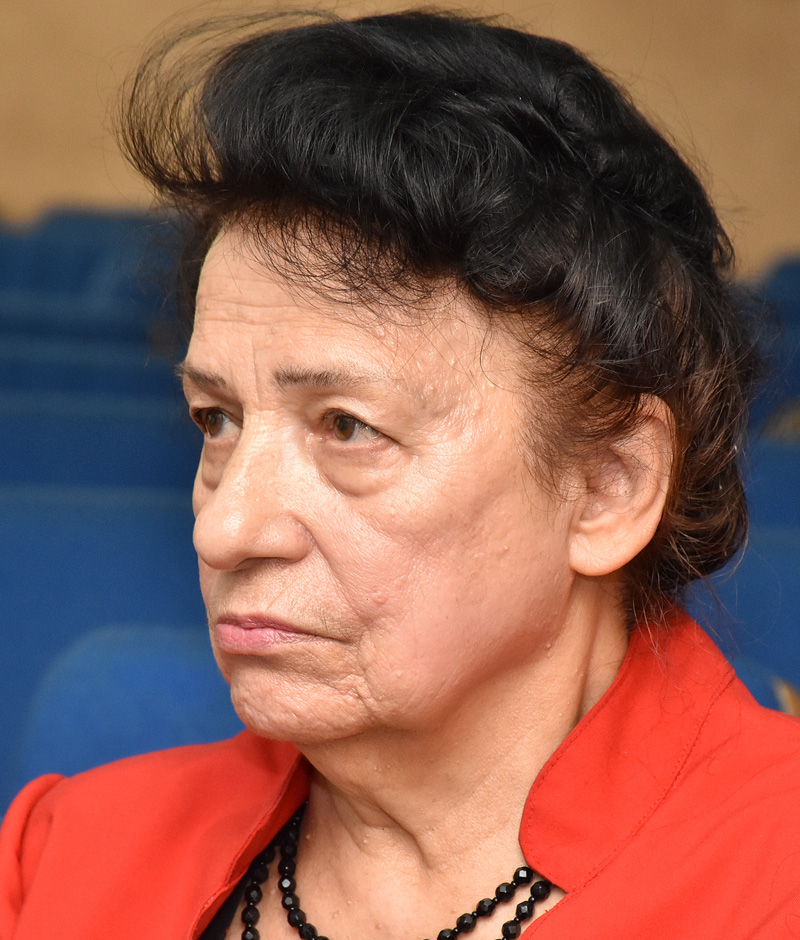
- Born: May 24, 1940 (age 86); Buchach, Chortkiv Raion, Ternopil Oblast, Western Ukraine
- Education: Lviv Polytechnic
- Occupations: design engineer; artist; writer; poet; songwriter

Bohdana Yosypivna Durda (Ukrainian: Богдана Йосипівна Ду́рда; born May 24, 1940) is a Ukrainian artist, writer, poet, and songwriter, as well as a former design engineer. Her artwork includes portraits, landscapes, and still lifes. She has illustrated children's books, and has written lyrics for more than 100 songs.

== Biography ==
Bohdana Yosypivna Durda was born in Buchach, Chortkiv Raion of Ternopil Oblast in Western Ukraine, May 24, 1940.

In 1965, she graduated from Lviv Polytechnic, and in 1991, from the Moscow Correspondence University of Arts.

From 1965 till 1996, Durda worked as a design engineer at the Ternopil Combine Plant, a chemical plant in Donetsk. Since 2003, she has been teaching at Ternopil Secondary School No. 24 and the Malvy Cultural and Art Center.

Durda has focused on her creative work since 1996, including portraits, landscapes, and still lifes, but has participated in art exhibitions since 1979. She has had solo exhibitions in Ternopil in 1997, 2003, and 2007), and in Buchach (2006).

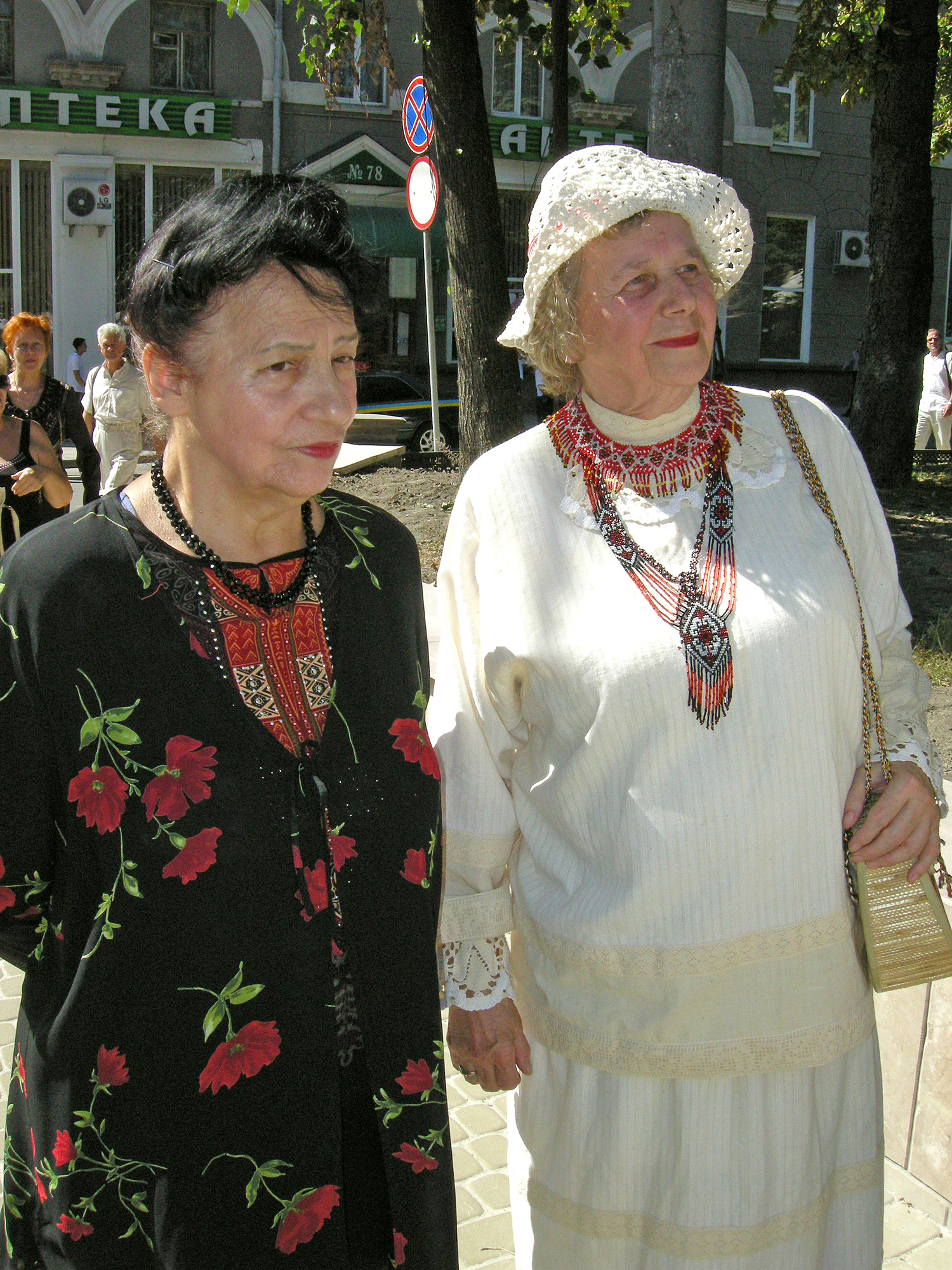
Ternopil writers Bohdan Durd and Marta Chopyk (2010)

She created illustrations for Marta Chopik's children's book, А що бачать очка (And What the Glasses See), as well as for her own books: На грані: Вірші, пісні (On the Verge: Poems, Songs) (2001), іка життя: Поеми, поезії (River of Life: Poems, Poetry) (2003), and Лабіринти долі (Labyrinths of Fate) (2006; all — Тернопіль).

Durda was a participant in the All-Ukrainian festival of author's songs "Oberig-93" in Lutsk. She has written lyrics for more than 100 songs.

== Selected works ==
=== Works of art ===
- Квіти (Flowers) (1991)
- Старий парк (Old Park) (1994)
- Польові квіти (Wildflowers) (1995)
- К. Білокур (K. Bilokur) (1996)
- Над греблею (Over the Dam) (1998)
- Після концерту (С. Крушельницька) (After the Concert (S. Krushelnytska)) (2000)
- М. Башкирцева (M. Bashkirtseva) (2002)
- Осінь (Autumn) (2003)

=== Literature ===
- Гриб А. Барвисті джерела. Т., 1998
- Na hrani, 2001
- Rika z︠h︡ytt︠i︡a: poemy, poeziï, 2003
