= Buchach =

City in Ternopil Oblast, Ukraine

Buchach Бучач
- City
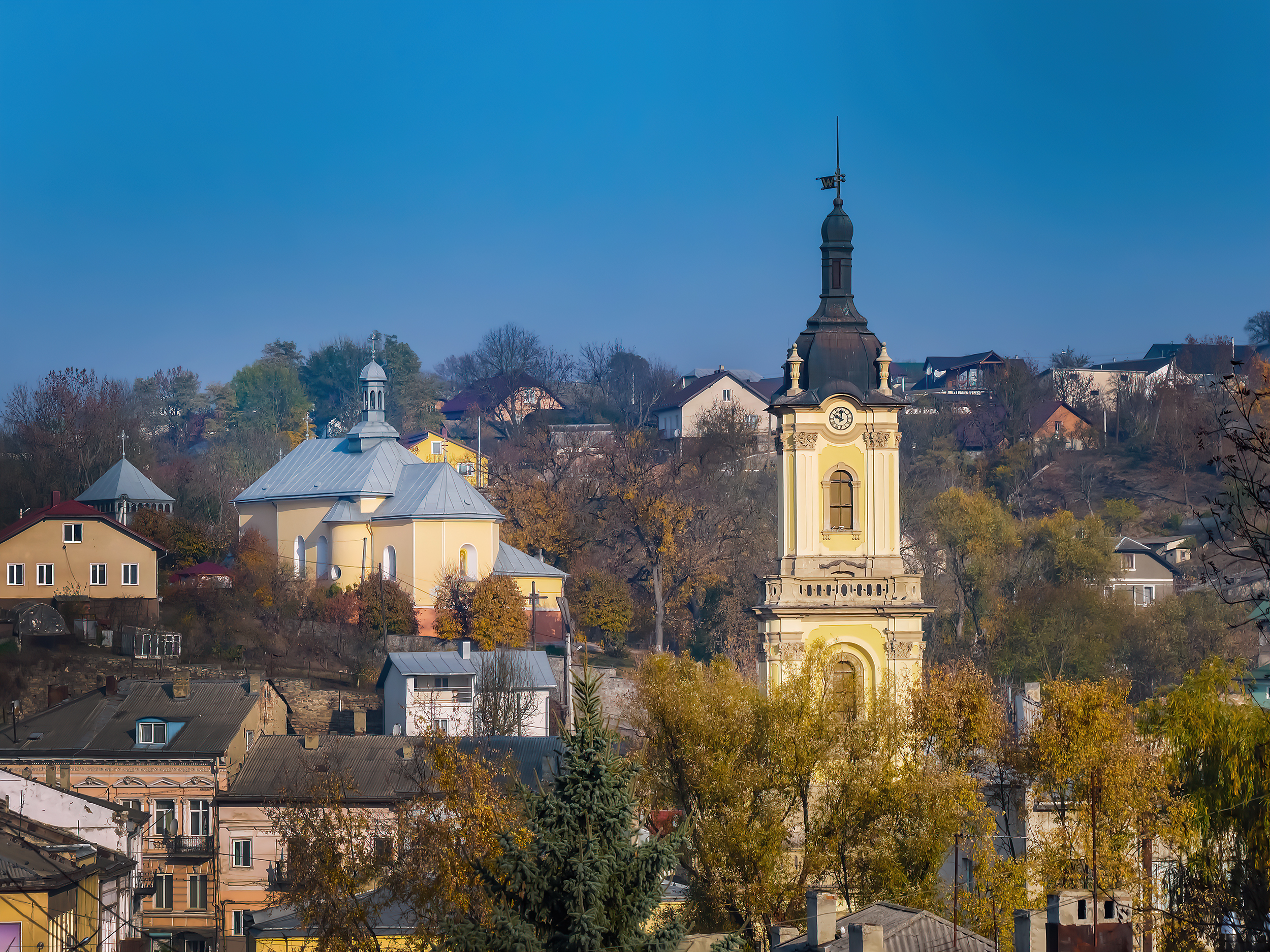
- Panoramic view of Buchach in 2017

- Coat of arms

- Location within Ukraine Location within Ternopil Oblast
- Coordinates: 49°05′00″N 25°24′00″E
- Country: Ukraine
- Oblast: Ternopil Oblast
- Raion: Chortkiv Raion
- Hromada: Buchach urban hromada
- First mention: 1260
- Magdeburg Rights: ab. 1370 (first), 1515 (second)

Government
  - City Head: Vitaly Freyak

Area
  - Total: 9.98 km^{2} (3.85 sq mi)

Population (2022)
  - Total: 12,171
- Time zone: UTC+2 (EET)
  - Summer (DST): UTC+3 (EEST)
- Postal code: 48400 — 48402
- Area code: +380 3544
- Website: https://buchachmiskrada.gov.ua

Buchach (Ukrainian: Бучач, IPA: [ˈbutʃɐtʃ]; Polish: Buczacz; Yiddish: בעטשאָטש, romanized: Betshotsh; German: Butschatsch) is a city located on the Strypa River (a tributary of the Dniester) in Chortkiv Raion of Ternopil Oblast (province) of Western Ukraine. It hosts the administration of Buchach urban hromada, one of the hromadas of Ukraine. Buchach rests 135 kilometres (84 miles) south-east of Lviv, in the historic region of Halychyna (Galicia).

The city was located in the Polish–Lithuanian Commonwealth until the partitions, followed by the Habsburg monarchy (1772–1804), Austrian Empire (1804–1867), Austria-Hungary (1867–1918), West Ukrainian People's Republic (1918–1919), the Second Polish Republic (1919–1939), and the Ukrainian SSR of the Soviet Union (1939–1991). In 2022 the population was estimated to be 12,171 (2022 estimate).

== History ==
The earliest recorded mention of Buchach is in 1260 by Bartosz Paprocki in his book "Gniazdo Cnoty, zkąd herby Rycerstwa Polskiego swój początek mają", Kraków, 1578. The validity of this date was reasonably refuted by the Polish scientist Józef Apolinary Rolle.

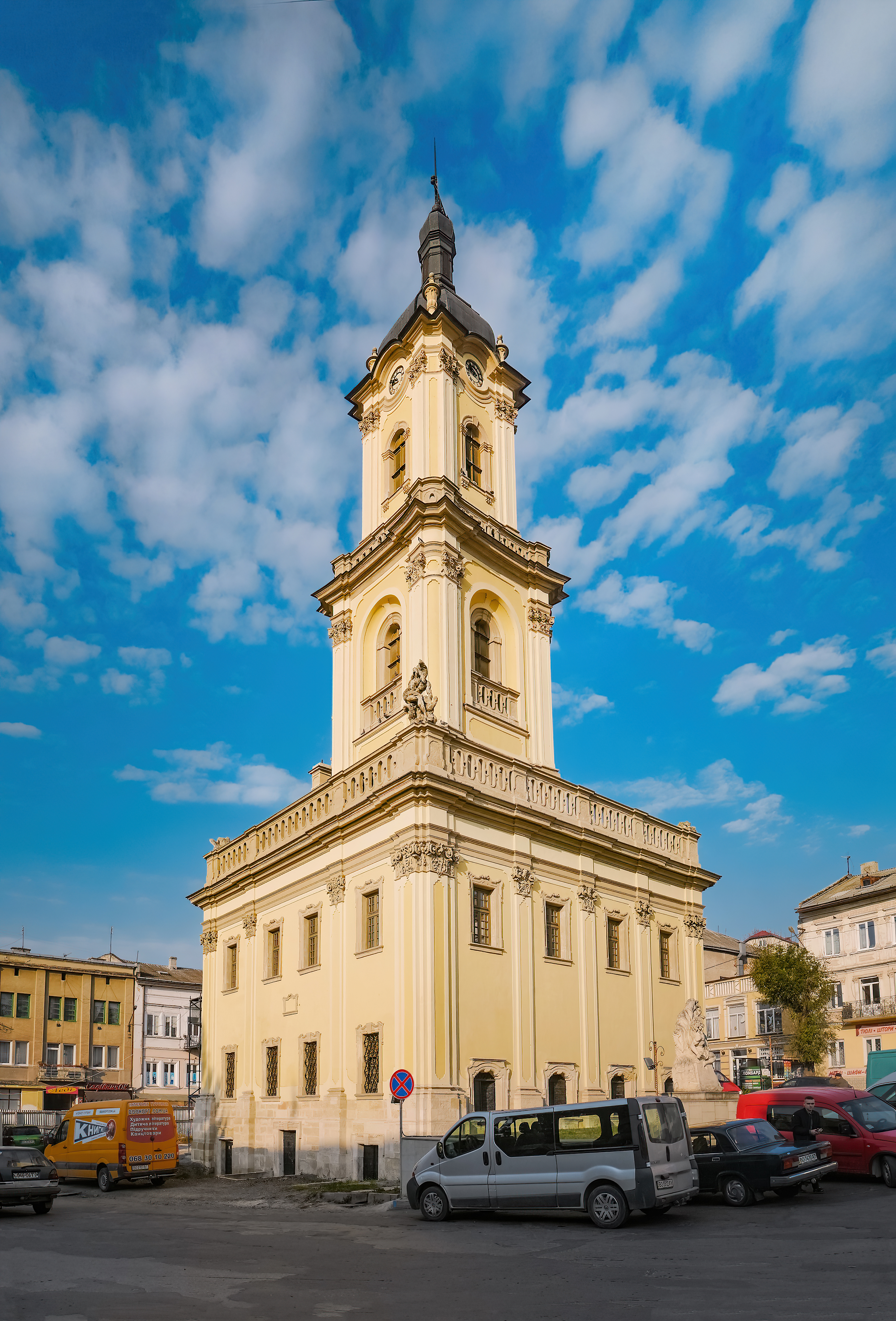
The old town hall, a joint work of architect Bernard Meretyn and sculptor Johann Georg Pinsel

In 1349, the region of Halychyna (Galicia) became part of the Kingdom of Poland. As a part of Ruthenian Voivodeship in the Lesser Poland Province remained in Poland from 1434 until 1772 (see Partitions of Poland). It was during this time that the area experienced a large influx of Polish, Jewish and Armenian settlers. In the late 14th century, Polish nobleman (szlachta) Michał Awdaniec became the owner of the town. On July 28, 1379, Michał Awdaniec founded a Roman Catholic parish church, and built a castle. According to at least one accounting, in 1393, King Władysław II Jagiełło agreed to grant Magdeburg rights to Buchach (Buczacz): it was first Magdeburg-style city, located in the Halych Land. In the early 15th century, the Awdaniec family of Buchach changed its last name into Buczacki, after its main residence. Frequent invasions of the Crimean Tatars brought destruction to the town, and in 1515, it once again received the Magdeburg rights. In 1558 Katarzyna Tworowska nee Buczacka got the king's grant for market in Buchach. In 1580, local castle was rebuilt: the castle was twice besieged by the Tatars (1665, 1667), who finally captured it in 1672, during the Polish–Ottoman War (1672–1676). Buchach was a temporary residence of Mehmed IV; here, on October 18, 1672, the Treaty of Buchach was signed between Polish–Lithuanian Commonwealth and the Ottoman Empire. According to this treaty, Poland handed the provinces of Ukraine and Podolia to Turkey.

In the 17th and 18th centuries, Buchach belonged to the Potocki family. Mikołaj Bazyli Potocki, the Starosta of Kaniv, Bohuslav, the son of Stefan Aleksander Potocki, Voivode of Bełz, who became a Greek-Catholic about 1758, built here Buchach cityhall with a 35-meter tower (near 1751), a late Baroque Roman Catholic Church of Assumption of Mary (1761–1763), and rebuilt the castle, destroyed by the Turks. With the unification of Poland and Lithuania in 1569, the newly united kingdom extended from the Baltic to the Black Sea. Owing to its importance as a market town, Buchach had become a prominent trading centre linking Poland and the Ottoman Empire.

In 1772, Eastern Galicia together with other areas of south-western Poland, became a part of Kingdom of Galicia and Lodomeria — a crownland of the Habsburg monarchy as part of the First Partition of Poland. Industry came to Buchach around the end of the 19th century. Among the small-scale industries there included a brickworks, and candle and soap factory, (modern) flour mills, a textile plant, and a necktie factory. The town also boasted a brewery and a winery. The largest factory was established early in the 1900s, when the Hilfesverein concern of Vienna set up a plant for the manufacture of wooden toys in Buchach employing some 200 workers, mainly young girls. In 1912 the Stanislaviv-based Savings and Credit Union opened a branch in Buchach, and this served as a bank for local industrialists and business.

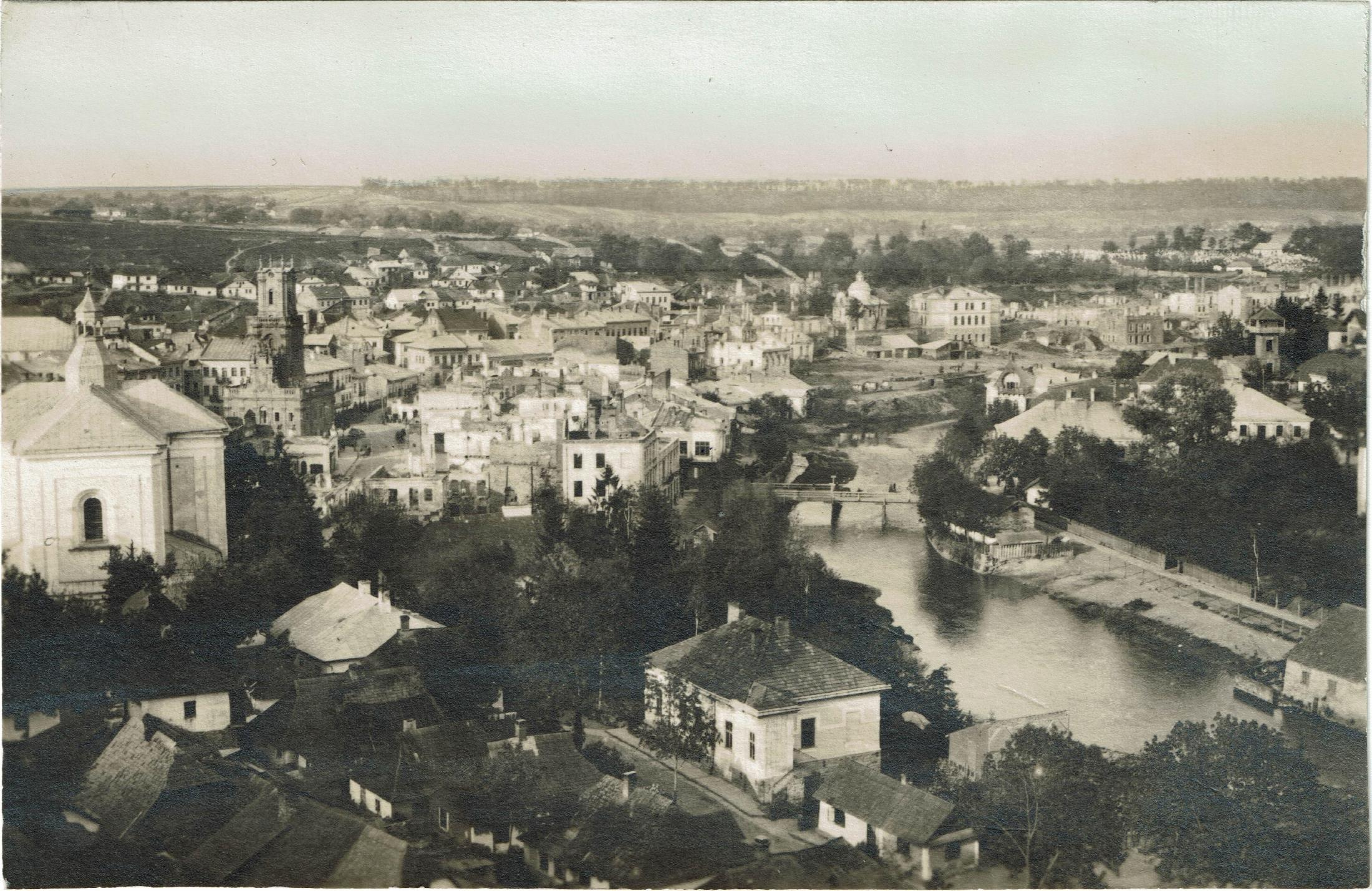
Early 20th-century view of the town

Buchach remained a part of Austria and its successor states until the end of the First World War in 1918. The town was briefly a part of the independent West Ukrainian People's Republic before it was captured by the Republic of Poland in July 1919 after Ukrainian-Polish War. Also, between August 10 and September 15, 1920, it was occupied by the Red Army (see Polish-Soviet War). In the Second Polish Republic, Buchach was the seat of a county (powiat) in Tarnopol Voivodeship. In the 1920s, Buchach was inhabited by Jews (~60%), Poles (~25%), and Ukrainians (~15%).

Before World War II, as many as 10,000 Jews (half of the local population) lived in Buchach. During the Nazi occupation of western Poland in 1939-early 1941, more Jewish refugees arrived in the town. On September 18, 1939, during the Soviet Invasion of Poland, Buchach was occupied by the Red Army, and incorporated into the Ukrainian SSR (see Molotov–Ribbentrop Pact). Before they left, the Soviets murdered civilians, mostly Ukrainian, and left them in the jails of Buchach and Czortków. During the Soviet occupation, many Jews and Christians were deported to the Soviet Union. Other Jews fled east when the Germans arrived. After the Soviets left, but before the Germans arrived in July 1942, Ukrainian militia looted and murdered Jewish residents of the town. Then in August, the Ukrainians assisted the German police in a mass shooting of 400 or so Jewish professionals and craftsmen.

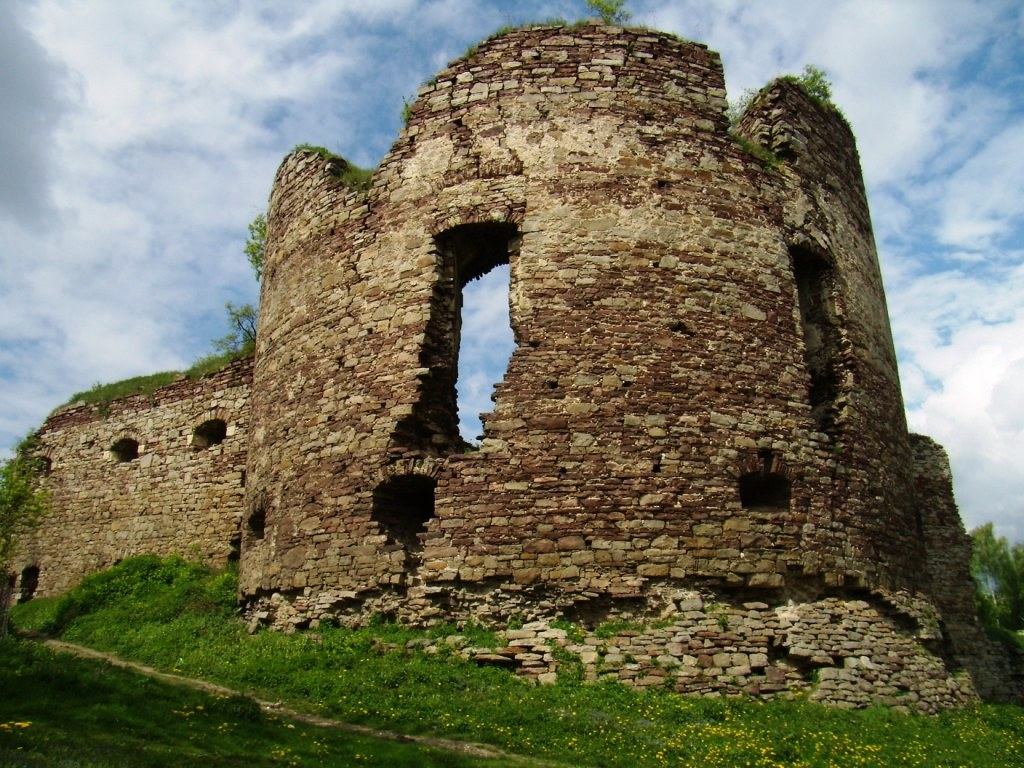
Buchach Castle

After the initial mass murder in August 1941, the Jewish community remained relatively intact, living in a ghetto (the Buchach Ghetto), until October 1942, when the Gestapo, aided by Ukrainian and Jewish police, rounded up nearly 2000 Jews, shot hundreds, and sent about 1600 to Belzec. Some survivors report that the Ukrainian mayor was fair to the Jews until fall 1941 when control reverted to the German security police and their Ukrainian auxiliaries. In November, 2500 more were sent to Belzec and more were shot in Buchach. In February 1943, about 2000 were led to Fodor Hill where they were shot and pushed into mass graves. Megargee reports that there was so much blood that the city's water supplies were polluted. The final major Aktion took place in April when 4000 Jews were shot on Fedor Hill and others in the streets. In May 1943, Buchach was proclaimed judenfrei.

During this time, some Jews were able to hide in the forests or join partisan bands. A few hid with Polish or Ukrainian friends. When Buchach was liberated by the Soviet army in March 1944, about 800 Jews were still alive. However, a counter offensive brought the Germans back to Buchach a few weeks later and the Germans hunted down the Jews. They were assisted by townspeople, many of whom were eager to point out hiding places. Property formerly owned by Jews was now in their hands and they feared Jewish revenge. When the Soviet army returned in July, fewer than 100 Jews had survived. Several of Buchach's survivors have published memoirs of this period, and a diary of Arah Klonicki-Klonymus who tried to hide in the forests with his wife and baby but was murdered is also well known. A detailed analysis of the murders of the Jews in Buchach in light of its history is told by Omer Bartov in his Anatomy of a Genocide: The Life and Death of a Town Called Buczacz.

Historical population
Year	Pop.	±%
1921	7,517	—
1931	10,265	+36.6%
2022	12,171	+18.6%

In 1945, its Polish residents were resettled into the lands of western Poland regained from Germany, and Communist authorities closed the parish church, turning it into a storage facility. Bones of the members of the Potocki family, kept in the church cellar, were thrown out, and later buried at the local cemetery.

In 1965, the neighboring village of Nahirianka was annexed to Buchach. After the fall of the Soviet Union in 1991, Buchach became a part of independent Ukraine, and new, Ukrainian government returned the church to its rightful owners. There is no longer a Polish or Jewish community in Buchach.

Until 18 July 2020, Buchach was the administrative center of Buchach Raion. The raion was abolished in July 2020 as part of the administrative reform of Ukraine, which reduced the number of raions of Ternopil Oblast to three. The area of Buchach Raion was merged into Chortkiv Raion.

== Coat of arms ==
The coat of arms of Buchach originated from the Piława coat of arms, which was used by the Potocki family.

== Education ==
Saint Josaphat Institute

== Religion ==
The city has religious communities of different churches: Ukrainian Greek Catholic Church, Ukrainian Autocephalous Orthodox Church, Ukrainian Orthodox Church – Kyiv Patriarchate, Adventist Church and others.

=== Churches ===
- St. Nicholas Church (n. 1610, Kievan Metropolis, UGCC, Russian Orthodox Church, Ukrainian Autocephalous Orthodox Church, now — Orthodox Church of Ukraine)
- Church of the Intercession (n. 1763, UGCC)
- Church of the Precious and Life-Giving Cross, or Church of the Elevation of the Cross (1771, UGCC) Church of the Honourable and Life-Giving Cross
- St. Michael Church (Nahirianka, 1910, built by Greek Catholics, from ab. 1990 Ukrainian Autocephalous Orthodox Church, now — Orthodox Church of Ukraine)
- St. Volodymyr Church (Ukrainian Orthodox Church – Kyiv Patriarchate, now — Orthodox Church of Ukraine)
- Procathedral Church of Annunciation to the Blessed Virgin Mary (2007—2014, UGCC)
- Church of Assumption of Mary (1761—1763, Roman Catholic church)

== Notable people ==
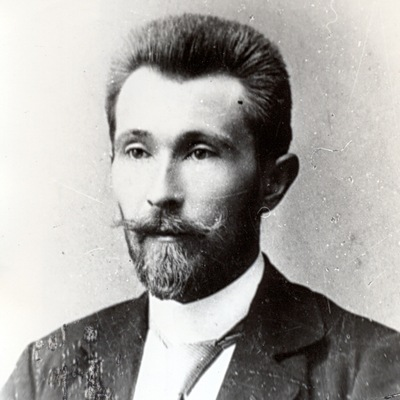
Volodymyr Hnatiuk

=== Born in Buchach ===
==== Ukrainians ====
- Mykola Bevz, scientist, member of ICOMOS
- Bohdana Durda (born 1940), artist, writer, poet, songwriter
- Musical Academy named after Mykola Lysenko
- Nataliya Katser-Buchkovska, a member of the "People's Front" political party and is part of the Ukrainian Parliament (8th convocation of the Ukrainian Verkhovna Rada).
- Tetiana Vytiahlovska, textile artist and tapestry weaver

==== Jews ====
- Shmuel Yosef Agnon (1888–1970), Nobel Prize-winning author
- Simon Wiesenthal, an Austrian writer and Nazi hunter
- Emanuel Ringelblum, historian, politician and social worker
- Mina Rosner, a Canadian writer
- Max Nomad (1881–1973) is the pseudonym of Austrian author and educator Max(imilian) Nacht.

=== People associated with Buchach ===
==== Ukrainians ====
- Volodymyr Hnatiuk (1871–1926) — writer, literary scholar, translator and journalist, and was one of the most influential and notable Ukrainian ethnographers
- Bohdan A. Futey, judge of the United States Court of Federal Claims from 1987 to 2002

==== Poles ====
- Stefan Potocki, voivode of Bratslav, starost of Fellin
- Stefan Aleksander Potocki, with wife Joanna founder of Buchach monastery UGCC
- Mikołaj Bazyli Potocki, starost of Bohuslav, Kaniv, benefactor of the Buchach's townhall, churches, Pochaiv Lavra
- Antoni Opolski, physicist, rector of Opole University

==== Jews ====
- Abraham David ben Asher Anshel Buczacz, Rabbi of Buchach
- Alicia Appleman-Jurman, Holocaust survivor and author

==== Unknown nationality ====
- Johann Georg Pinsel, Baroque sculptor, named Halych's Michelangelo
- Bernard Meretyn, an architect of the late Baroque and rococo (possibly of German origin)

== Communications ==
The closest international airports are:

- Lviv International Airport, in Lviv (LWO), ca. 190 km (118 mi) away
- Ivano-Frankivsk International Airport, in Ivano-Frankivsk (IFO), ca. 50 km (31 mi) away
- Chernivtsi International Airport, in Chernivtsi (CWC), ca. 70 km (43 mi) away
- Rzeszów International Airport, in Rzeszów (RZE), Poland, ca. 220 km (137 mi) away

== International relations ==
=== Twin towns and sister cities ===
Buchach is currently twinned with:

- Złotoryja, Poland
- Kazimierza Wielka, Poland

== Sources ==
- (in Polish and Latin) Sadok Barącz, Pamiątki buczackie.— Lwów: Drukarnia «Gazety narodowej», 1882.— 168 s.
