= Alicia Appleman-Jurman =

Polish–American memoirist (1930 – 2017)

Alicia Ada Appleman
- Born: Alicia Jurman; May 9, 1930; Rosulna, Poland
- Died: April 8, 2017 (aged 86); San Jose, California, U.S.
- Resting place: Oak Hill Memorial Park, San Jose, California
- Citizenship: Poland, United States, Israel
- Occupations: Holocaust spokesperson; writer; activist
- Spouse: Gabriel Appleman
- Children: Dan Appleman, Roan Bear, Zachary Appleman
- Writing career
- Subjects: The Holocaust

Alicia Appleman-Jurman (née Jurman; May 9, 1930 – April 4, 2017), also known as Alicia Ada Appleman, was a Polish–American memoirist, born in Rosulna, Poland (present-day Rosilna, Ukraine), who has written and spoken about her experiences of the Holocaust in her autobiography, Alicia: My Story.

== Early life ==
The sole female and the second-youngest child of Sigmund and Frieda Jurman in a family of five children, Alicia Jurman was raised from the age of five in Buczacz. Her parents and four brothers (Moshe, Bunio, Herzl and Zachary) were all murdered during the Holocaust.

She escaped the Germans by being thrown through the window of a train taking members of her community to an extermination camp, hiding in bunkers, living in fields, barns, and pretending to be Polish or Ukrainian. After losing her entire family at a young age, Alicia continued to have a strong will to survive. After Germany's defeat, she joined the underground group Bricha, helping smuggle Jews out of Poland to Austria, then on to the Palestine Mandate, which would become Israel. In early 1947 she sailed aboard the Theodor Herzl, which was stopped by the Britain's Royal Navy. The ship's crew and passengers were sent to Cyprus and interned for eight months there. In December 1947, Jurman made it to the Palestine Mandate.

She was part of the Palyam, later serving in the “Chayl HaYam” naval forces that fought at Jaffa. There she met Gabriel Appleman, a volunteer from the United States. They wed in 1950 and came to the United States two years later. They returned to Israel in 1969 and were there during the Yom Kippur War (1973), and returned to the U.S. in 1975. The couple had two sons, and a daughter.

== Death ==
On April 4, 2017, Appleman-Jurman went into hospice after a failed surgery to repair a leaking mitral valve. She was surrounded by family and friends as she died in the early morning of April 8, 2017.

== Alicia: My Story ==
Her autobiography, Alicia: My Story, was published in Toronto and New York by Bantam in 1988. A reviewer for the New York Times said that the book "is so profoundly observed, and the life it records so remarkably lived, that no amount of prior immersion in the sad community of witnesses to the Holocaust can dull the reader to its heroine." She was described as a person of "ferocious bravery". According to WorldCat, the book is held in 1176 libraries. It has been translated into French (Alicia: l'histoire de ma vie); into German (Alicia: Überleben, um Zeugnis zu geben); into Danish (Alicia: min historie); into Swedish (Alicia: min historia), into Dutch (Vergeten kan ik niet), and into Spanish (Alicia, la historia de mi vida).

== Other writing ==
- Alicia: My Story Continues: a Journey in Historical Photographs, San Jose, CA: Desaware Publishing, 2013; ISBN 1936754096/ISBN 978-1936754090
- Six Cherry Blossoms and other stories, Desaware Publishing (2012); ISBN 1936754010/ISBN 9781936754014 (includes incidents that occurred both before and after the events in Alicia: My Story)

== Filmography ==
Alicia Live: A Presentation by Alicia Appleman-Jurman (April 10, 2012).

== Additional reading ==
- University of San Francisco, Alicia Appleman-Jurman: Her Story and Beyond
