= Buchach Monastery =

Greek Catholic monastery in Buchach, Ukraine

- Бучацький монастир
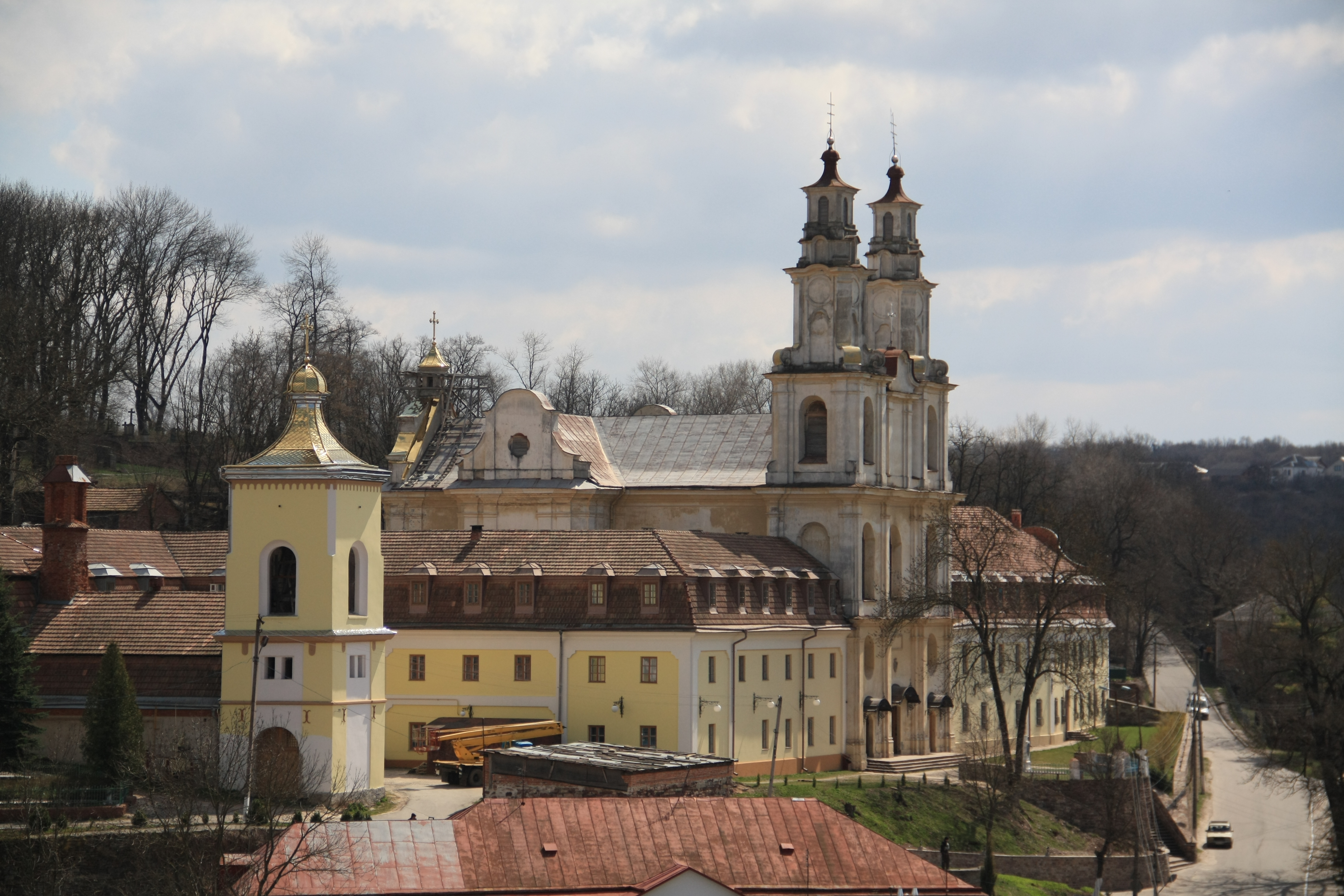
- View of the monastery from Buchach city hall

- Location within Ternopil Oblast Location within Ukraine

Monastery information
- Order: Order of Saint Basil the Great
- Denomination: Catholic Church (Ukrainian Greek Catholic Church)
- Established: 1712
- Diocese: Buchach

Site
- Location: Buchach
- Country: Ukraine
- Coordinates: 49°03′36″N 25°23′47″E

Immovable Monument of National Significance of Ukraine
- Official name: Василіанський монастир (мур.) (Basilian Monastery (stone))
- Type: Architecture
- Reference no.: 190075

The Buchach Monastery of the Exaltation of the Holy Cross of Basilian Fathers (Ukrainian: Бучацький монастир отців Василіян Воздвиження Чесного Хреста Господнього) is a Basilian monastery in Buchach, Ternopil Oblast, Ukraine. For centuries, it has been one of the centers of the Ukrainian Greek Catholic Church in Western Ukraine. The monastery is situated near the Fedir hill in Buchach, 18 km southwest of Monastyryska and about 70 km south of Ternopil.

It was founded by Stefan Aleksander Potocki and his wife Joanna née Sieniawska, daughter of Mikołaj Hieronim Sieniawski. In the charter (signed on 7 December 1712 in Lublin) they donated 30,000 zlotys to the Basilians with the purpose of improving education of the Greek Catholic clergy. Their son Mikołaj Bazyli Potocki later made additional donations.

In 1714 the Archdiocese of Lviv (in the person of Archbishop Jan Skarbek) transferred a small Latin Catholic church in Buchach to the local Basilians. This decision was made permanent by Archbishop Mikołaj Gerard Wyżycki on 29 April 1747.

On 18 September 1771 with the permission of Metropolitan Leo Sheptytsky the abbot of the monastery (Father Innocent Mshanetskyi) consecrated the newly built monastery church of the Elevation of the Precious and Life-Giving Cross.

Major restoration works began in the late 1990s and, as of 2018, were still ongoing.

== Sources ==
- Sadok Barącz. Pamiątki buczackie.— Lwów: Drukarnia «Gazety narodowej», 1882.— 168 s. (in Polish)
- Basilian Monastery
