= Buchach Castle =

Ruined castle in Buchach, Ukraine

Coordinates: 49°03′35″N 25°23′29″E

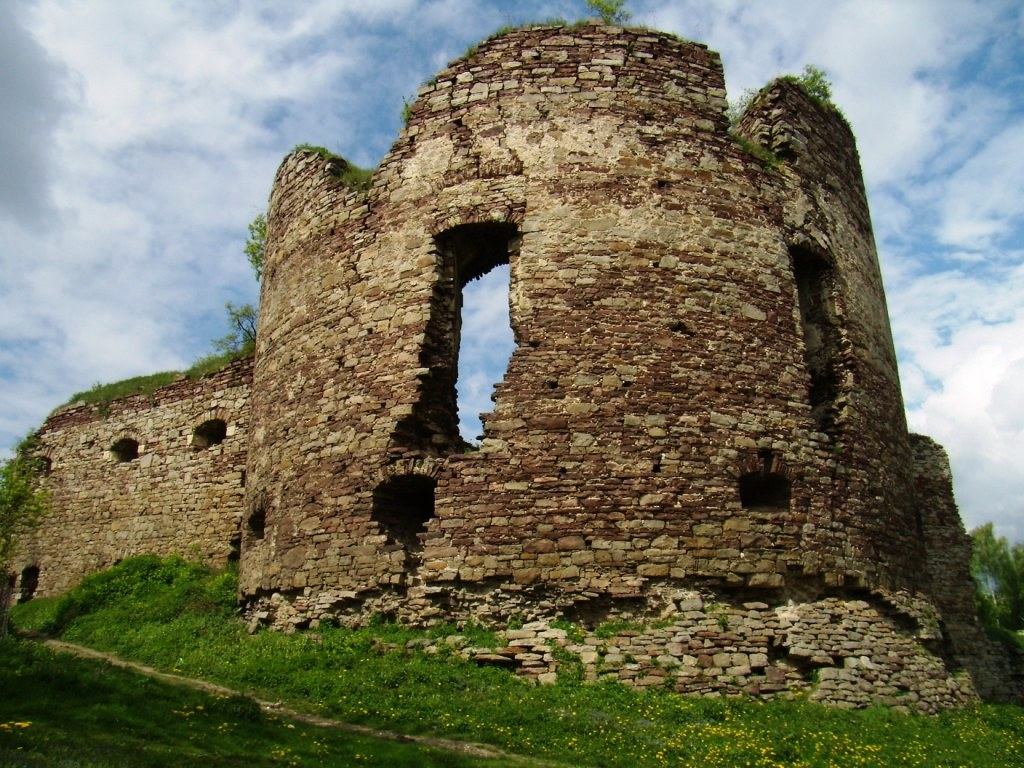
The castle in 2008

The Buchach Castle (Ukrainian: Бучацький замок, romanized: Buchats'kyi zamok) is a ruin of a medieval castle, located in Buchach, Ternopil Oblast, Ukraine. It was built by the Buchacki family in the 14-15th century at around the time the town was founded. It was rebuilt by the Potocki-Movile family in the 16-17th century in a Renaissance style. It was a defensive structure, and saw combat several times. It fell into disrepair following its destruction by the Ottomans in the late 17th century. During the 19th century, while under the Austrian partition, it was partially demolished to reclaim building material. Today, it is a tourist attraction open to visitors.

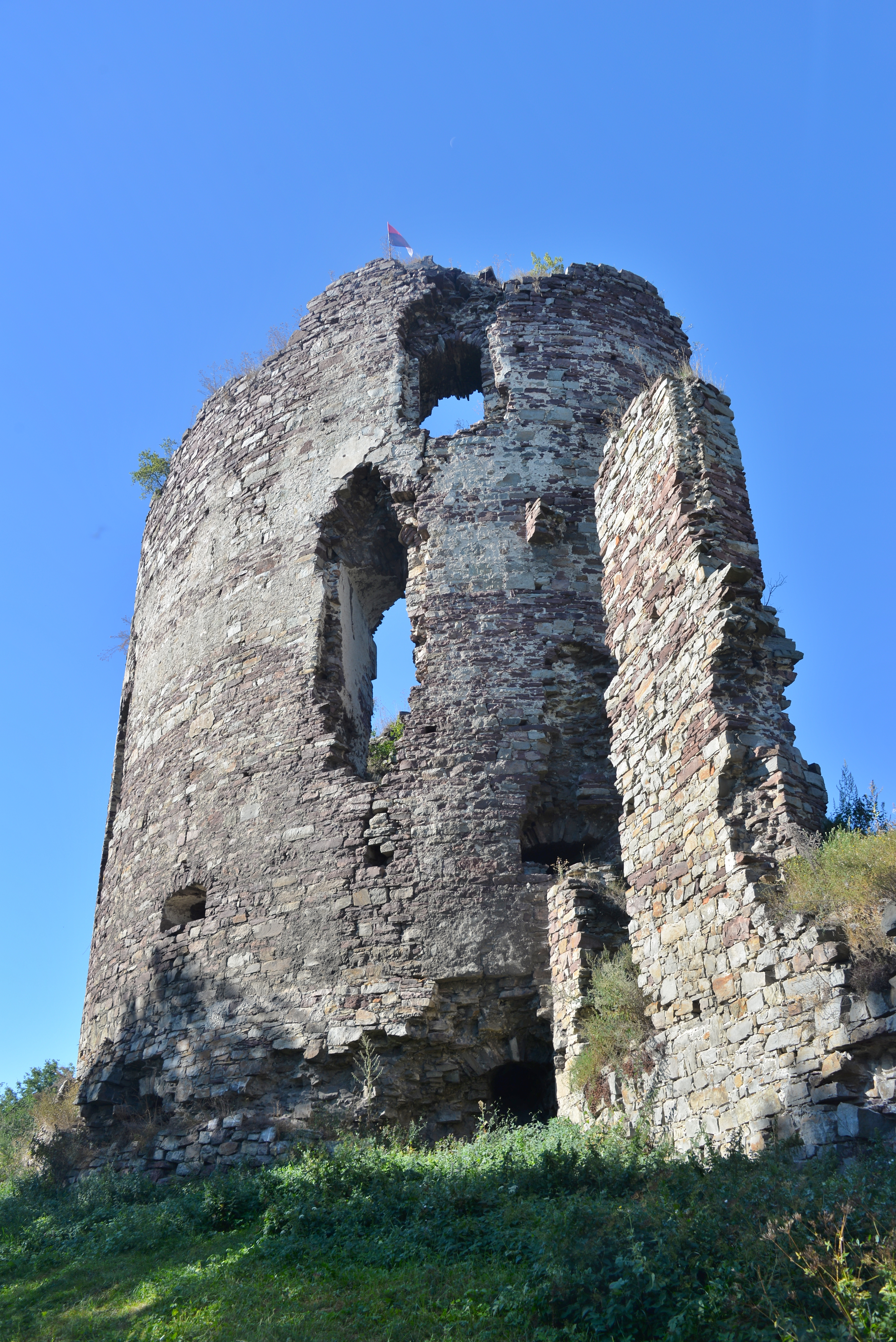
Tower outside

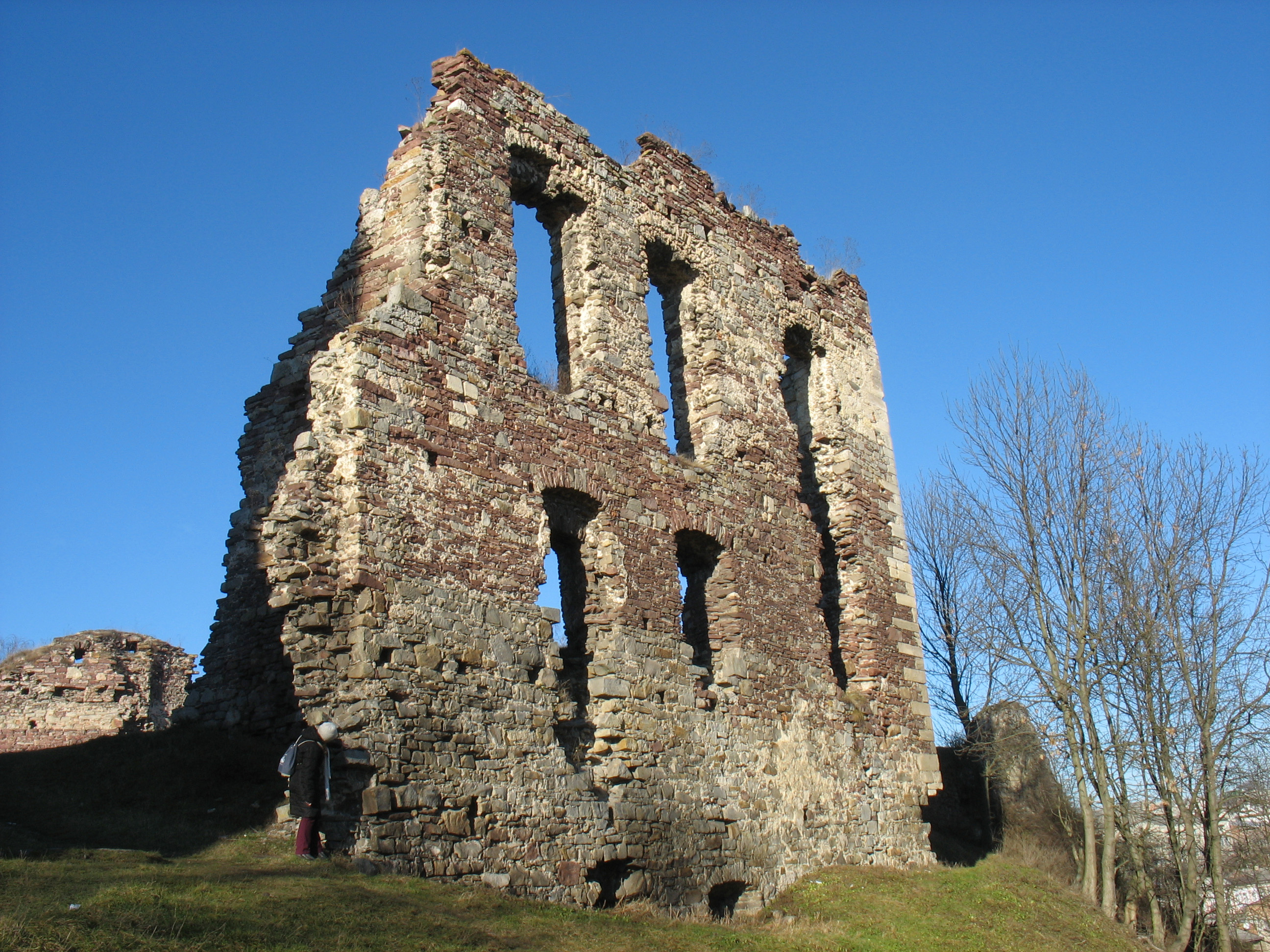
Ruins of the palace

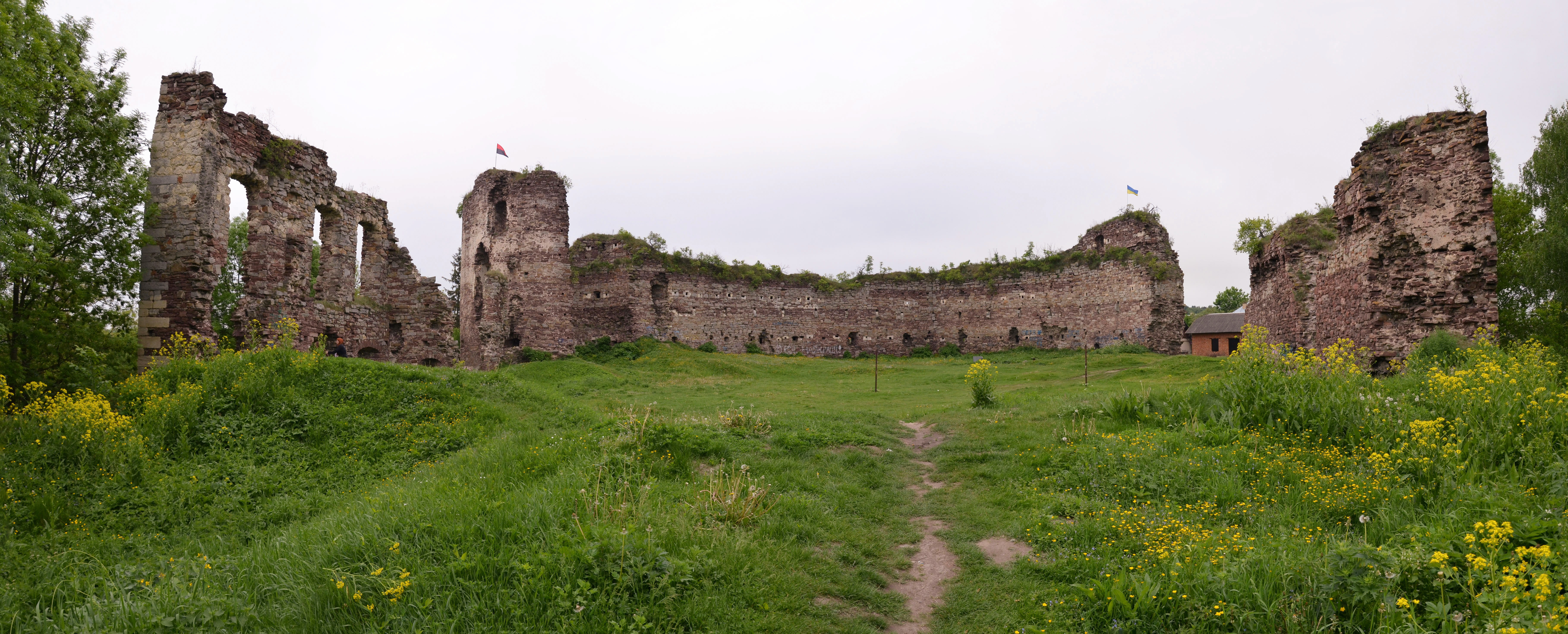

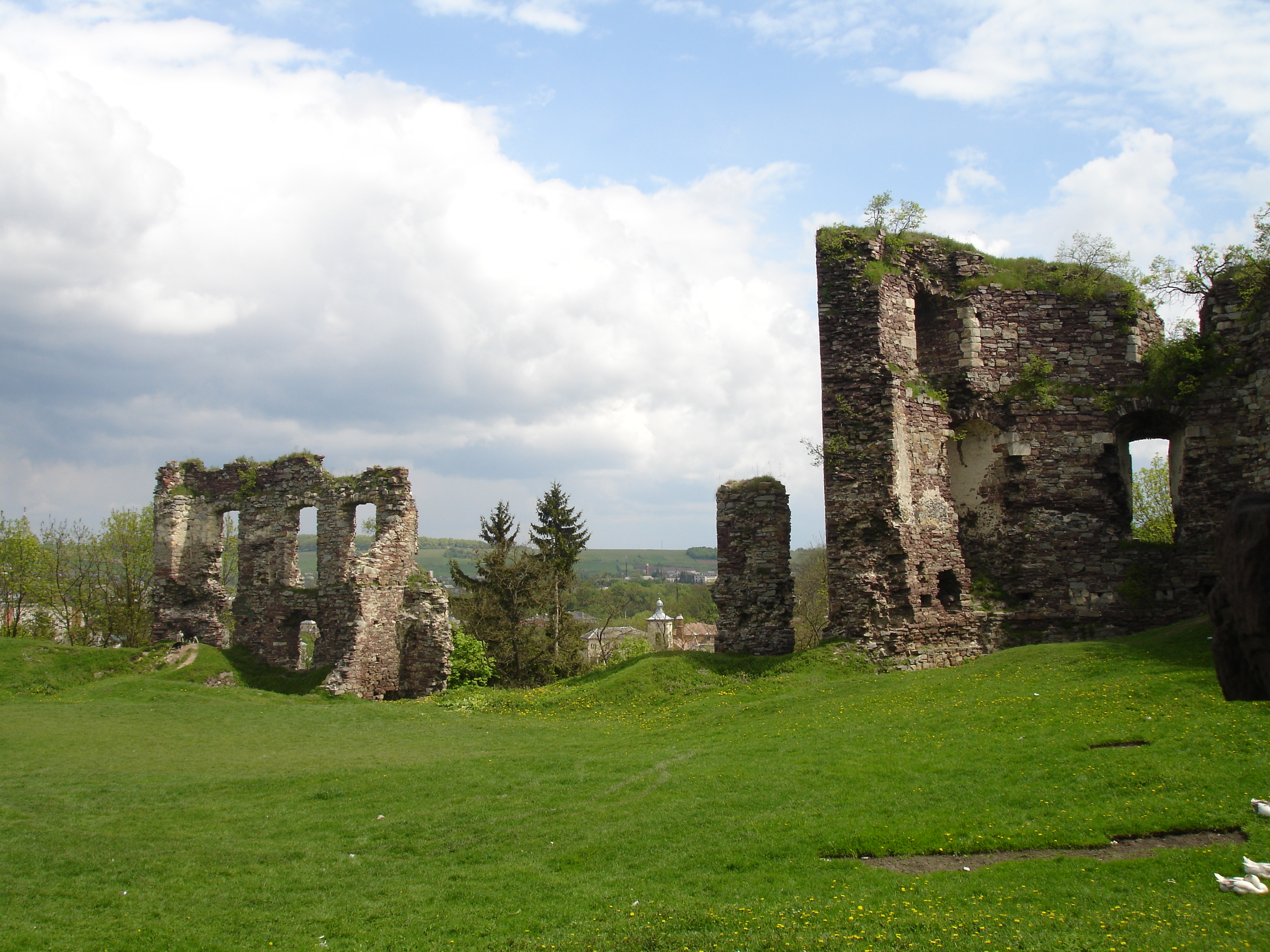

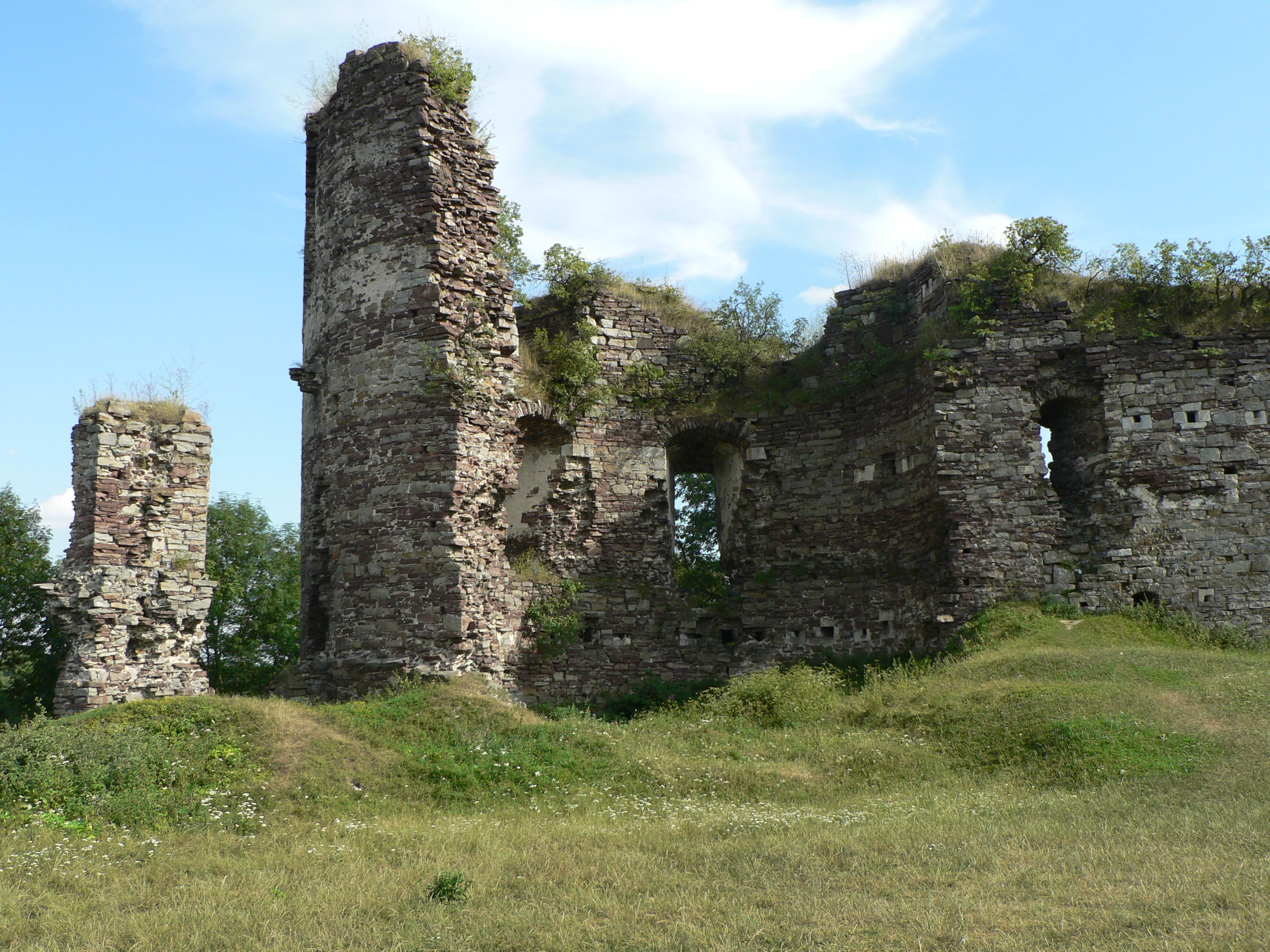

== Bibliography ==
- Stanisław Sławomir Nicieja, Twierdze kresowe Rzeczypospolitej, Wydawnictwo Iskry, Warszawa, 2006, p. 35–46, ISBN 83-244-0024-9
