= Mikołaj Bazyli Potocki =

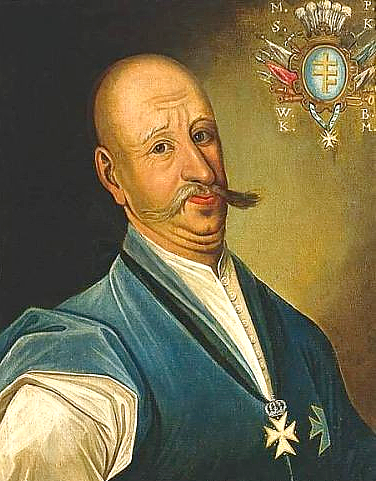
- Coat of arms: Clan Piława
- Born: around 1712
- Died: 1782
- Buried: Pochayiv Lavra, Ternopil Oblast, Ukraine (then Polish–Lithuanian Commonwealth
- Noble family: Potocki
- Spouse: Marianna Dąbrowska
- Father: Stefan Aleksander Potocki
- Mother: Joanna Sieniawska

Mikołaj Bazyli Potocki (ab. 1712 – 13 April 1782) was a Polish nobleman, starost of Kaniv, Bohuslav, benefactor of the Buchach townhall, Pochayiv Lavra, Dominican Church in Lviv, deputy to Sejm and owner of the Buchach castle.

Mikołaj's father, Stefan Aleksander Potocki, Governor of Bełz, with his second wife, Joanna Sieniawska, were the founders of Basilian monastery of the UGCC in Buchach. Mikołaj Hieronim Sieniawski was his grandfather.

Infamous for his many excesses and habits, he was immortalized in many Polish and Ukrainian stories and legends (especially those of the 19th century), notably in the Ukrainian ballad Bondarivna (about a cooper's daughter, whom he murdered when she refused to live with him). Zygmunt Krasiński, in his Nieboska Komedia, referred to him as a "governor, who shot women on the trees and baked Jews alive" ("Ów, starosta, baby strzelał po drzewach i Żydów piekł żywcem"). Near the end of his life, after the first partition of Poland, when many of his lands passed under Austrian rule, he was ordered to disband his private army. He then attempted to create an image of a pious and almost saintly person, moving to a monastery and sponsoring many religious buildings and organisations – nonetheless, even until his last years, he retained a harem.

Buried in Ławra Poczajowska (Pochayiv Lavra).

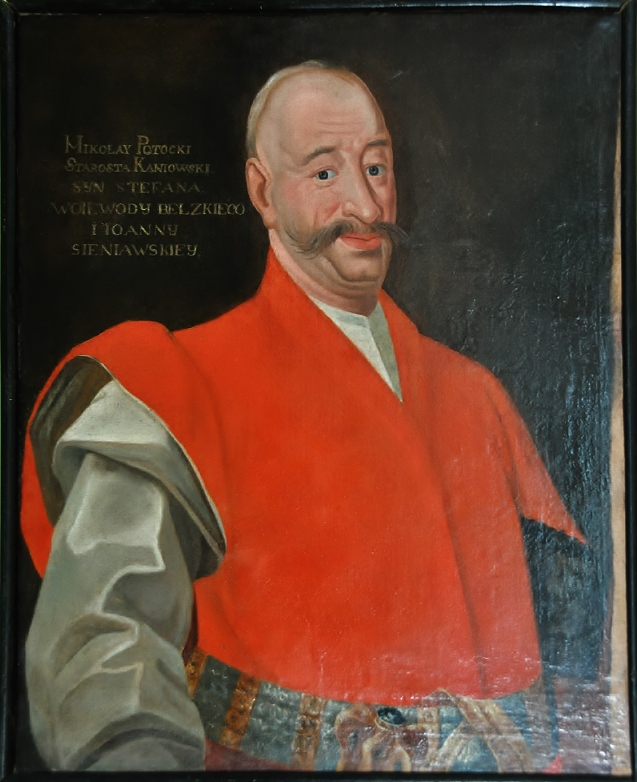
Portrait of Potocki held in Lviv

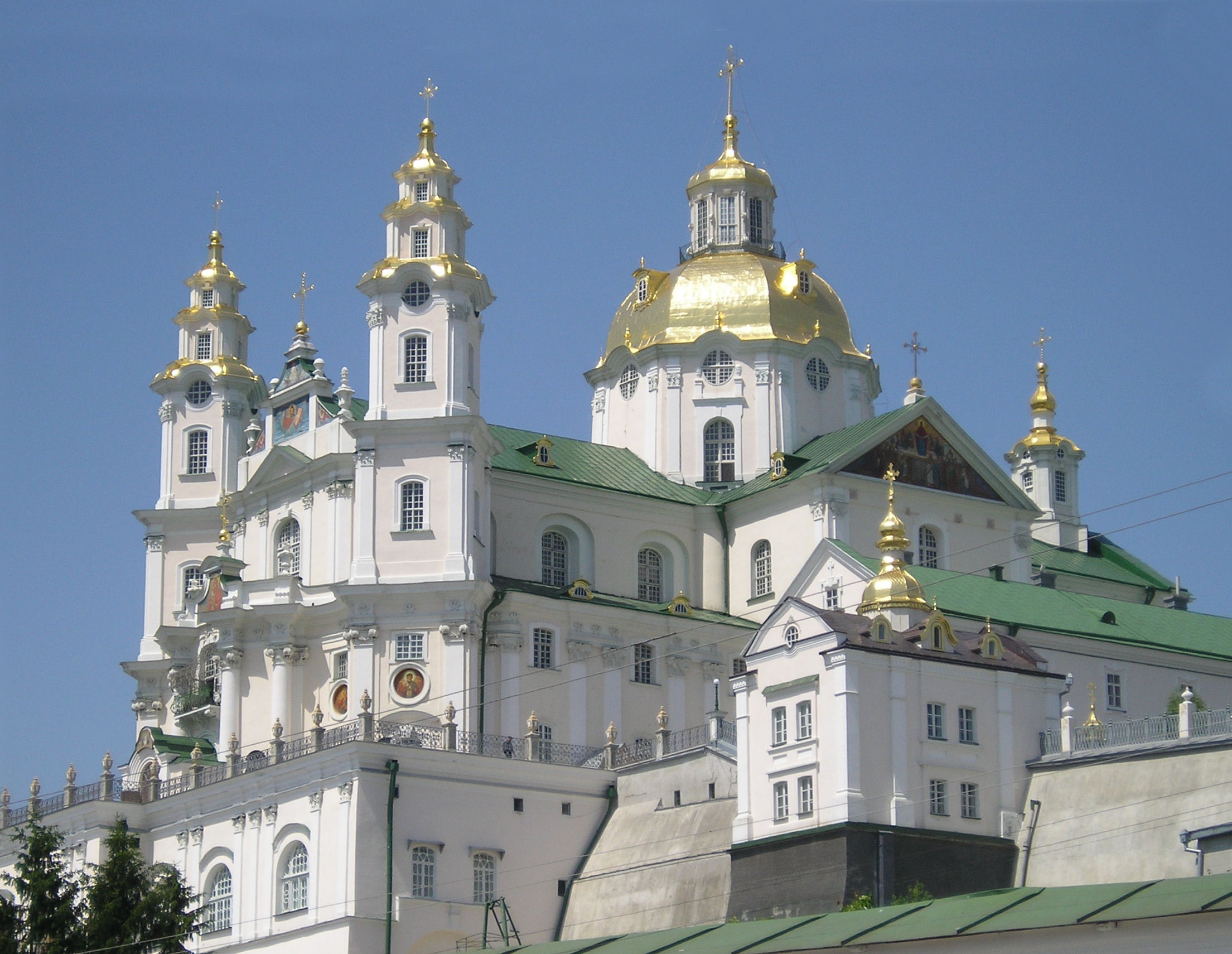
Pochayiv Lavra

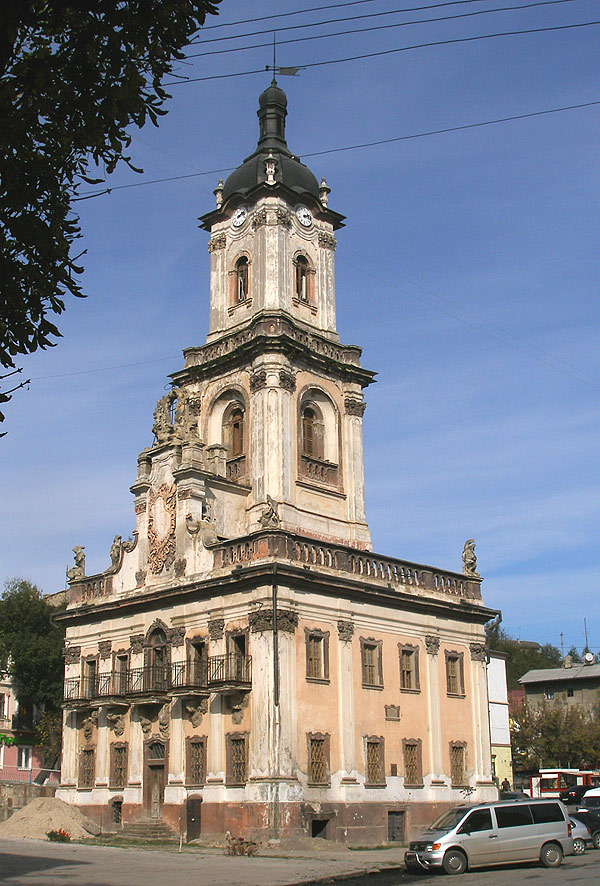
Buchach townhall (1750–1751)

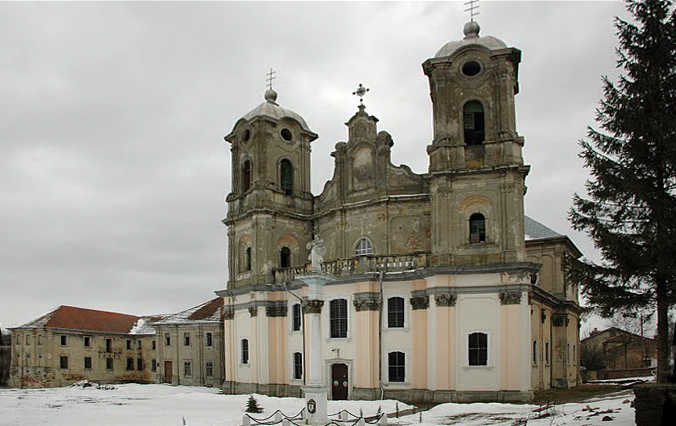
Greek Catholic Church (former Roman Catholic Church) in Horodenka

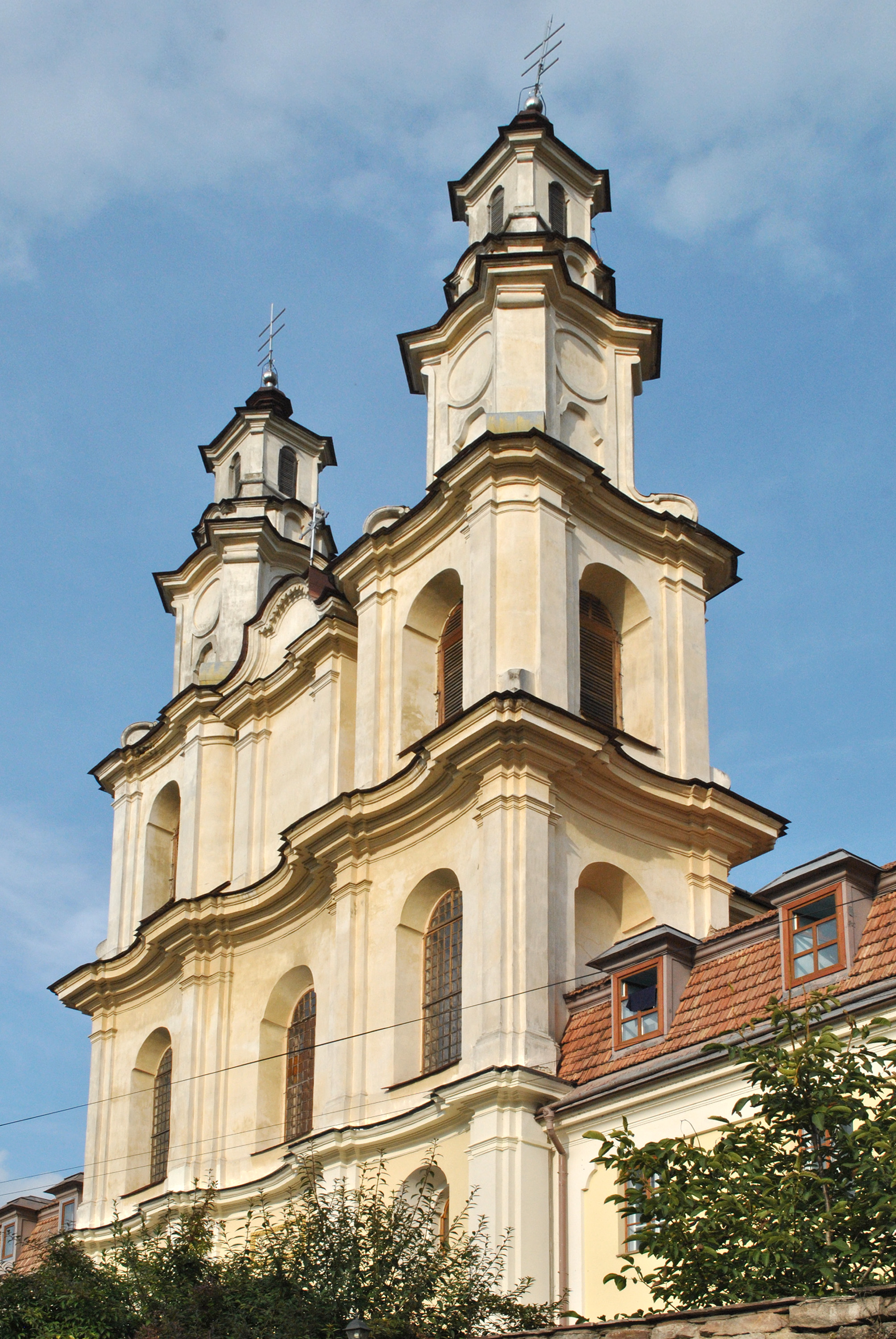
Church of the Precious and Life-Giving Cross, Buchach

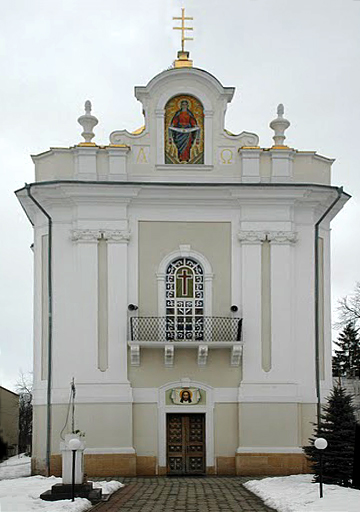
Greek Catholic Church in Horodenka

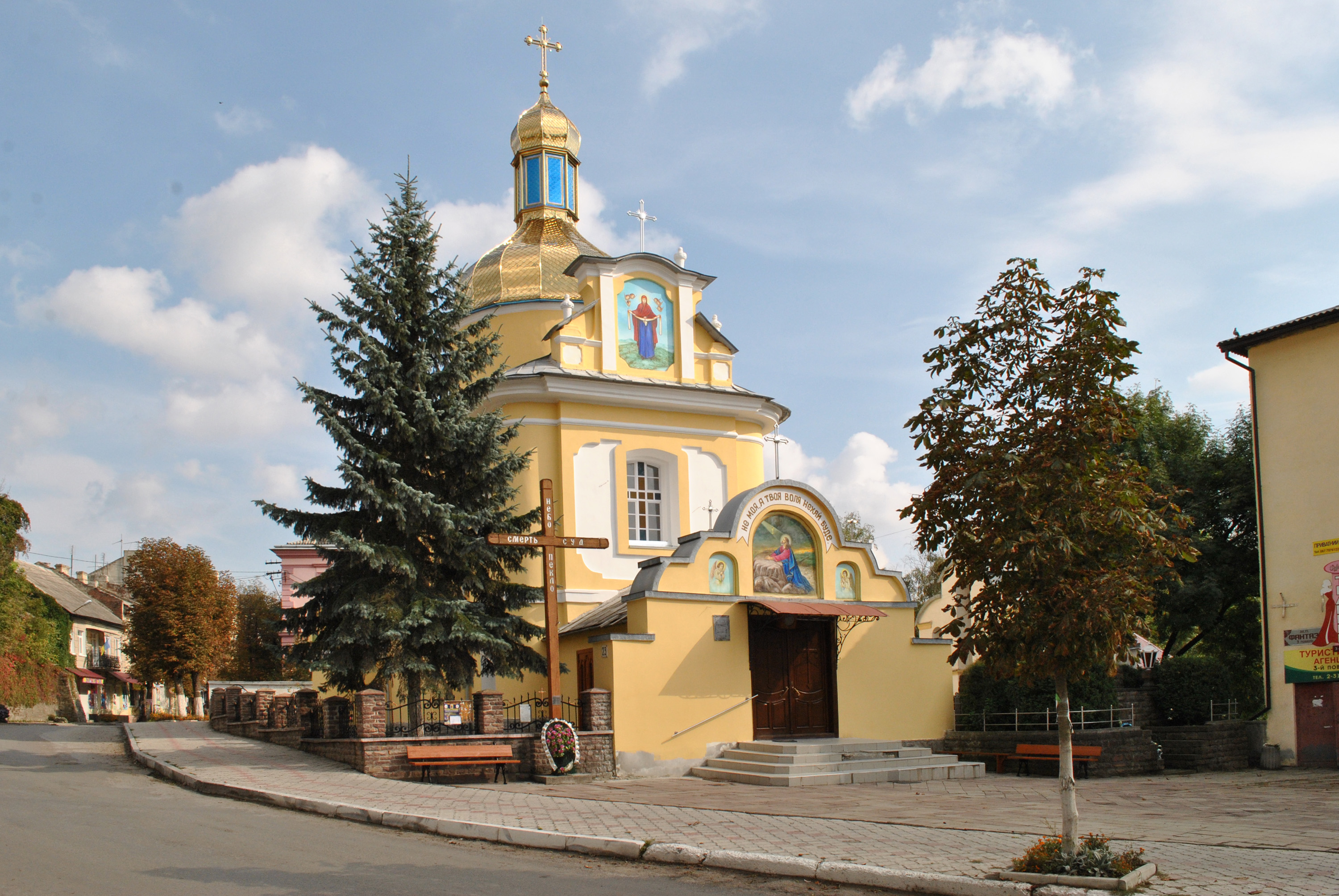
St. Pokrova church, Buchach

== Sources ==
- Sadok Barącz. Pamiątki buczackie.— Lwów: Drukarnia «Gazety narodowej», 1882.— 168 p. (in Polish and Latin)
- Zofia Zielińska. Potocki Mikołaj Basyli / Polski Słownik Biograficzny.— Wrocław — Warszawa — Kraków — Gdańsk — Łódź, Zakład Narodowy Imienia Ossolińskich, Wydawnictwo Polskiej Akademii Nauk, 1984.— t. XXVIII/1, zeszyt 116.— 178 p.— P. 113–115. (in Polish)
