= Sadok Barącz =

Friar, historian, folklorist, and archivist (1814–1892)

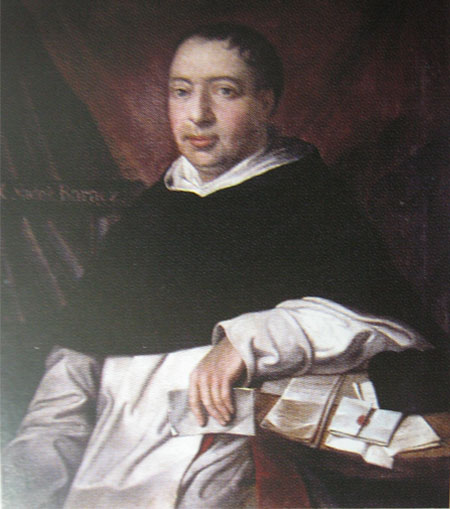

Sadok Barącz (Armenian: Սադոկ Վինցենտի Ֆէրերուշ Բարոնչ, Polish: Sadok Barącz, 29 April 1814 in Stanislau, now Ivano-Frankivsk – 2 April 1892 in Pidkamin, now Zolochiv Raion, Lviv Oblast) was a Galician religious leader, historian, folklorist, archivist, of Armeniandescent. A Dominican friar, he was for about 40 years, prior of Pidkamin Dominican convent. He was buried at the Pidkamin cemetery.

== Books ==
- Barącz S. Objaśnienie wyznania wiary rzymsko-katolickiej i Rzecz s. Cypryana biskupa i męczennika o jedności Kościoła katolickiego ku oświeceniu i zbudowaniu wiernych chrystusowych.— Poznań, 1845.
- Barącz S. Pamiątki miasta Żółkwi.— Lviv, 1852.
- Barącz S. Pamiętnik dziejów Polskich. Z aktów urzędowych Lwowskich i z rękopismów.— Lwów, 1855.
- Barącz S. Pamiętnik dziejów Polski.— Lviv, 1855.
- Barącz S. Żywoty sławnych Ormian w Polsce.— Lviv, 1856.
- Barącz S. Pamiątki miasta Stanisławowa.— Lwów, 1858.
- Barącz S. Wiadomość o klasztorze WW. OO. Dominikanów w Podkamieniu.— Lwów, 1858.
- Barącz S. Rys dziejów zakonu kaznodziejskiego w Polsce.— T. 2.— Lwów, 1861.
- Barącz S. Pamiątki jazłowieckie.— Lwów, 1862.
- Barącz S. Wolne miasto handlowe Brody.— Lwów, 1865; накладом автора
- Barącz S. Bajki, fraszki, podania, przysłowia i pieśni na Rusi.— Tarnopol, 1866.
- Barącz S. Rys dziejów ormiańskich.— Tarnopol, 1869.
- Barącz S. Dzieje klasztoru WW. OO. Dominikanów w Podkamieniu.— Tarnopol, 1870.
- Barącz S. Pamiętnik zakonu WW. OO. Bernardynów w Polscze.— Lwów, 1874.
- Barącz S. Badacz: studium obyczajowe.— Brody, 1875.
- Barącz S. Klasztor WW. OO. Dominikanów w Starym Borku.— Lwów, 1878.
- Barącz S. Pamiętnik szlachetnego Ledochowskich domu.— Lwów, 1879.
- Barącz S. Pamiątki buczackie.— Lwów, 1882.
- Barącz S. Archiwum WW. OO. Dominikanów w Jarosławiu.— Lwów, 1884.
- Barącz S. Wiadomość o Ponikowicy Małej.— Poznań, 1886.
- Barącz S. Jan Tarnowski: szkic biograficzny.— Poznań, 1888.
- Barącz S. Klasztór i kościół Dominikanów w Krakowie.— Poznań, 1888.
- Barącz S. Smotrycki Melecy: szkic bibliograficzny (Gołogóry).— Poznań, 1889.
- Barącz S. Kassyan Sakowicz : szkic bibliograficzny.— Poznań, 1889.
- Barącz S. Założce.— Poznań, 1889.
- Barącz S. Gawath Jakób : szkic bibliograficzny.— Poznań, 1890.
- Barącz S. Cudowne obrazy Matki Najświętszej w Polsce.— Lwów, 1891.
